= Florida's 28th congressional district =

U.S. House district for Florida

- Map of district boundaries
- Representative: Carlos Giménez; R–Miami
- Population (2025): 792,798
- Median household income: $85,431
- Ethnicity: 72.7% Hispanic; 15.1% White; 8.6% Black; 1.6% Asian; 1.4% Two or more races; 0.6% other
- Cook PVI: R+10

Florida's 28th congressional district is a district created as a result of the 2020 census. The first candidates ran in the 2022 House elections for a seat in the 118th United States Congress. The district was created during the 2020 redistricting cycle, as the successor to the previous 26th district in the 2010s. It includes all of Monroe County, home to the Florida Keys, and many of Miami's outer southwestern suburbs, including all of Homestead, The Hammocks, Kendale Lakes, Tamiami, and others. All three of Florida's national parks – the Everglades, Biscayne, and the Dry Tortugas – are also located in this district.

The district's first, and current, Representative is Republican Carlos Giménez.

== Recent election results from statewide races ==
| Year | Office | Results |
|---|---|---|
| 2008 | President | Obama 51% - 49% |
| 2010 | Senate | Rubio 51% - 21% |
| 2010 | Governor | Scott 50.4% - 49.6% |
| 2010 | Attorney General | Bondi 52% - 43% |
| 2010 | Chief Financial Officer | Atwater 54% - 41% |
| 2012 | President | Obama 55% - 45% |
| 2012 | Senate | Nelson 57% - 43% |
| 2014 | Governor | Crist 53% - 47% |
| 2016 | President | Clinton 56% - 40% |
| 2016 | Senate | Rubio 50% - 48% |
| 2018 | Senate | Nelson 53% - 46% |
| 2018 | Governor | Gillum 52% - 46% |
| 2018 | Attorney General | Shaw 51% - 47% |
| 2018 | Chief Financial Officer | Ring 52% - 48% |
| 2020 | President | Trump 53% - 47% |
| 2022 | Senate | Rubio 63% - 37% |
| 2022 | Governor | DeSantis 64% - 36% |
| 2022 | Attorney General | Moody 63% - 37% |
| 2022 | Chief Financial Officer | Patronis 63% - 37% |
| 2024 | President | Trump 62% - 37% |
| 2024 | Senate | Scott 61% - 38% |

== Composition ==
For the 118th and successive Congresses (based on redistricting following the 2020 census), the district contains all or portions of the following counties and communities:

Miami-Dade County (19)

Country Walk, The Crossings, Florida City, Fountainebleau (part; also 26th), Goulds, The Hammocks, Homestead, Homestead Base, Kendale Lakes, Kendall West, Leisure City, Naranja, Princeton, Richmond West, South Miami Heights, Sweetwater, Tamiami, Three Lakes, Westchester

Monroe County (13)

All 13 communities

== List of members representing the district ==
| Representative | Party | Years | Cong ress | Electoral history | Geography |
|---|---|---|---|---|---|
District created January 3, 2023
| Carlos A. Giménez (Miami) | Republican | January 3, 2023 – present | 118th 119th | Redistricted from the 26th district and re-elected in 2022. Re-elected in 2024. Re-elected in 2026. | 2023–2027; Monroe; part of Miami-Dade |

== Election results ==
=== 2022 ===
2022 Florida's 28th congressional district election
| Party | Candidate | Votes | % |
|---|---|---|---|
| Republican | Carlos Giménez (incumbent) | 134,457 | 63.69 |
| Democratic | Robert Asencio | 76,665 | 36.31 |
| Total votes | | 211,122 | 100.0 |
| Republican win (new seat) | | | |

=== 2024 ===
2024 Florida's 28th congressional district election
| Party | Candidate | Votes | % |
|---|---|---|---|
| Republican | Carlos Giménez (incumbent) | 210,057 | 64.57 |
| Democratic | Phil Ehr | 115,280 | 35.43 |
| Total votes | | 325,337 | 100.0 |
| Republican win (new seat) | | | |
