= Lindgren Road =

Boulevard in Miami-Dade County, Florida, U.S.

Lindgren Road
- State Road 825; West 137th Avenue
- SR 825 in red, other segments in blue

Route information
- Maintained by FDOT and Miami-Dade County
- Length: 24 mi (39 km) 4.014 miles (6.460 km) as SR 825
- Existed: early 1980s–present

Major junctions
- South end: SW 344th Street, Palm Drive in Homestead
- US 41 in Tamiami; SR 836 in Tamiami
- North end: NW 25th Street in Tamiami

Location
- Country: United States
- State: Florida
- Counties: Miami-Dade

Highway system
- Florida State Highway System; Interstate; US; State; Former; Pre‑1945; Toll; Scenic
← SR 824	→ SR 826

Lindgren Road is a north–south boulevard in Miami-Dade County, Florida. It is also known as Northwest 137th Avenue and Southwest 137th Avenue, as laid out in the Miami-Dade street grid. The road also carries two segments of the State Road 825 (SR 825) designation. The southern 2.54-mile (4.09 km) segment extends from the entrance of Miami Executive Airport north to State Road 94, while the northern segment is 1.47-mile-long (2.37 km) and travels from U.S. Route 41 (US 41) to NW 12th Street, just past the western terminus of the Dolphin Expressway (SR 836). 10.3 miles (16.58 km) of Lindgren Road connects the two state-maintained segments. An additional 16-mile (25.7 km) segment extends southward from Miami Executive Airport to Homestead.

== Route description ==
State Road 825 begins at the intersection of Southwest 137th Avenue and Southwest 128th Street, near the entrance of the Miami Executive Airport. SR 825 heads north, with the airport in unincorporated Miami-Dade County to the west and commercial business in the CDP of Three Lakes to the east of the road. At Southwest 120th Street, SR 825 exits the airport property, and drives through residential housing for most of the rest of this section. Prior to the 1990s, most of this route was surrounded by farmland. It then intersects Southwest 104th Street, the former State Road 990, continuing north through residential housing. At Southwest 90th Street, commercial businesses take over the landscape of SR 825 for the last two blocks until it terminates at the intersection of State Road 94, the only state road that this section of SR 825 intersects.

Based on the current grid method of numbering Florida State Roads, SR 825 is incorrectly numbered. In Band 9, of the state, SR 825 lies further west than SR 985 (Southwest 107th Avenue north of SR 94) and SR 989 (Southwest 112th Avenue south of US 1), and lies east of SR 997 (Krome Avenue). Based on the roads location and nearby route numbers, Lindgren Road would normally merit a designation of State Road 993.

In 2022, two new sections were opened the northern section between SR 994 (SW 200 ST, Quail Roost Drive) and SW 240 ST, and the southern section between SW 248 ST and U.S. Route 1 (South Dixie Hwy) to directly connect all sections of the road from SW 344 ST to NW 25 ST

== History ==
The Florida Department of Transportation added the route in the early 1980s in a campaign to increase access to the county's commercial airports. In 2009, the northern segment was adopted and widened to cater to motorists coming off the newly built western extension of the Dolphin Expressway.

== Major intersections ==
The entire route is in Miami-Dade County.

Location	mi	km	Destinations	Notes
	0.0	0.0	SR 994 (Quail Roost Drive)	Southwest 200th Street
Country Walk	3.1	5.0	Coral Reef Drive	Southwest 152nd Street
Country Walk	4.7	7.6	Southwest 128th Street – Kendall-Tamiami Airport	South end of state maintenance
The Crossings	6.7	10.8	Killian Parkway	
Kendale Lakes	7.244	11.658	SR 94 (Kendall Drive) to Florida's Turnpike Extension	Southwest 88th Street; north end of state maintenance
Kendale Lakes	8.344	13.428	Sunset Drive	Southwest 72nd Street
Kendale Lakes–Tamiami line	10.344	16.647	Bird Road	Southwest 42nd Street
Tamiami	11.344	18.256	Coral Way	Southwest 26th Street
Tamiami	12.544	20.188	US 41 (Southwest 8th Street)	Tamiami Trail; south end of state maintenance
Tamiami	13.984	22.505	SR 836 east	West end of SR 836
Tamiami	14.014	22.553	Northwest 12th Street	North end of state maintenance
1.000 mi = 1.609 km; 1.000 km = 0.621 mi: Electronic toll collection; Route transition
