= Florida State Road 990 =

Highway in Florida

State Road 990
- Killian Drive / Killian Parkway
- SR 990 highlighted in red

Route information
- Maintained by FDOT
- Length: 2.970 mi (4.780 km) Killian Drive / Killian Parkway extends 11.6 miles (18.7 km) total
- Existed: 1982–present

Major junctions
- West end: SR 874 / SR 985 in Kendall
- East end: US 1 in Pinecrest

Location
- Country: United States
- State: Florida
- Counties: Miami-Dade

Highway system
- Florida State Highway System; Interstate; US; State; Former; Pre‑1945; Toll; Scenic
← SR 989	→ SR 992

State Road 990 (SR 990) is the 2.97-mile-long (4.78 km) central section of the approximately 11.6-mile-long (18.7 km) Killian Drive, also known as Killian Parkway, Southwest 104th Street and Southwest 112th Street and historically South Kendall Drive, located in southern Miami-Dade County, Florida. Running from east to west, it serves to connect the community of The Hammocks with the village of Pinecrest via the community of Kendall, with State Road 990 connecting Southwest 107th Avenue (State Road 985) and the Don Shula Expressway (State Road 874) to the South Dixie Highway (U.S. Route 1). Recognising the role the road played in southern Miami-Dade County's history and development, the section of State Road 990 between the Expressway and US 1 was designated the Killian Drive State Historic Highway by the Florida Senate in 1995.

== Route description ==
=== Western section ===
Southwest 104th Street begins at a cul-de-sac west of The Hammocks, near the Aerojet canal, and proceeds east as a paved two-laned road, providing access to some small farms. Upon reaching Krome Avenue (SR 997) a mile later, Southwest 104th Street doglegs to the north approximately 500 feet (150 m) and then continues east as an unsigned private dirt road through farmland for approximately one mile. Well within The Hammocks, Southwest 104th Street resumes as a paved access road for a Catholic high school and proceeds east to meet Southwest 167th Avenue. The road is squeezed between the backs of housing neighborhoods and farmland until Southwest 162nd Avenue, where it expands to be a four-laned divided road. Proceeding east past more residential neighborhoods, Southwest 104th Street gains the Killian Parkway designation by Southwest 157th Avenue. From here, Killian Parkway heads east for another two miles (3.2 km), passing by condominium complexes, neighborhood shopping centers and more neighborhoods until reaching Lindgren Road (SR 825), where it leaves The Hammocks and enters the community of The Crossings. On the other side of Lindgren Road, Killian Parkway expands to six lanes, and then, after passing by the backs of more neighborhoods, Killian Parkway passes over the Homestead Extension of Florida's Turnpike without an interchange and enters Kendall. Yet again, the road passes by the rear of more neighborhoods and some shopping centers, although the Kendall Campus of Miami-Dade College lies on the northern side of the road as it nears the Don Shula Expressway (SR 874). Soon past the college, the State Road 990 designation begins.

=== State Road 990 section ===
According to the Florida Department of Transportation, State Road 990 begins about 60 feet (18 m) to the west of the southbound onramp to the Don Shula Expressway. From here, SR 990 proceeds east as a six-laned road to the junction between the southbound ramps and Southwest 107th Avenue, which marks the southern terminus of SR 985. Now known as Killian Drive, SR 990 begins to curve to the southeast as it crosses over the Expressway, losing its Southwest 104th Street designation and two of its lanes, but gaining the protected historical highway designation. It proceeds through a residential neighborhood for approximately 0.6 miles (0.97 km) before turning back to the east and gaining the Southwest 112th Street designation. At the end of the curve, Killian Drive narrows to two lanes and loses its central median. SR 990 takes on an almost rural character once it passes Southwest 97th Avenue, becoming tree-lined and having soft shoulders, resemblant of when the road was first laid. Killian Drive passes by large-lotted houses and churches for the next mile (1.6 km), whereupon it crosses Galloway Road (SR 973). Continuing for another 0.7 miles (1.1 km) past more houses and schools, SR 990 crosses the South Miami-Dade Busway and immediately intersects with US 1, which is the border between Kendall and Pinecrest, and the eastern terminus of the State Road and the historical highway.

=== Eastern section ===
Killian Drive/Southwest 112th Avenue continues east of SR 990's terminus through the village of Pinecrest, regaining an urban character as it passes by more houses, although remaining tree-lined and soft-shouldered. After crossing a couple of canals, Killian Drive meets Ludlam Road (Southwest 67th Avenue) about 1.3 miles (2.1 km) east of US 1. The road wiggles north one block between Southwest 62nd and 60th Avenues, thus replacing its secondary designation with Southwest 111th Street. Between Southwest 60th Avenue and its terminus at Red Road (Southwest 57th Avenue) outside the Pinecrest Gardens, the road is named Franz and Louise Scherr Street in honour of their founding of the Parrot Jungle, which once stood where the Pinecrest Gardens are now.

== History ==
Killian Drive is named in honor of Dan Killian who was an area pioneer and county commissioner, responsible for the Kendall area's first hospitals, stores, street lights and the railway depot along the former Florida East Coast Railway. The road that now bears his name has been identified as one of the first major east–west roads across southern Miami-Dade County. The Florida Senate passed Bill 834 which designated the segment of SR 990 between the Dan Shula Expressway and US 1 as the Killian Drive State Historic Highway on May 5, 1995 (effective June 1, 1995), in recognition of Dan Killian's contributions to Miami-Dade County as well as Killian's Drive scenic values, citing: "Killian Drive retains its original character and appearance, in great contrast to other more modern highways and roads in Dade County, providing a visible and tangible reminder of the heritage of Killian Drive and representing a link with the past of southern Florida which, once destroyed, could never be restored..." In addition, Southwest 104th Street was once known as South Kendall Drive, marking the former southern boundary of Kendall.

The road was originally designated by the Florida Department of Transportation as State Road 936 (SR 936) in 1982, with the western terminus at SR 825 at the boundary of The Crossings and The Hammocks, and the eastern terminus at Red Road, then designated SR 959. The western end was truncated to SR 985 by 1990. About four years later, the route was redesignated SR 990. By the end of the decade, the SR 990 signs were removed from Killian Drive east of US 1, about the same time SR 959 was eliminated south of US 1.

== Major intersections ==
The entire route is in Miami-Dade County.

Location	mi	km	Destinations	Notes
The Hammocks	0.0	0.0	Southwest 157th Avenue	Continues west as Southwest 104th Street
The Crossings	3.1	5.0	SR 825 (Lindgren Road)	
Kendall	6.1	9.8	SR 985 north (Southwest 107th Avenue)	West end of SR 990; south end of SR 985
Kendall	6.3	10.1	SR 874 – Airport	
Kendall	8.3	13.4	SR 973 (Galloway Road)	Southwest 87th Avenue
Kendall–Pinecrest line	9.0	14.5	US 1 (Dixie Highway / Pinecrest Parkway)	East end of SR 990
Pinecrest	11.5	18.5	Old Cutler Road	
1.000 mi = 1.609 km; 1.000 km = 0.621 mi: Tolled; Route transition
