= Florida State Road 874 =

Highway in Florida

State Road 874
- South Miami Dade Don Shula Expressway
- SR 874 highlighted in red

Route information
- Maintained by GMX
- Length: 7.034 mi (11.320 km)
- Existed: 1973–present

Major junctions
- South end: Florida's Turnpike Extension in Three Lakes
- SR 878 in Kendall
- North end: SR 826 in Glenvar Heights

Location
- Country: United States
- State: Florida
- Counties: Miami-Dade

Highway system
- Florida State Highway System; Interstate; US; State; Former; Pre‑1945; Toll; Scenic
← SR 870	→ SR 876

State Road 874 (SR 874), named the South Miami Dade Don Shula Expressway for its length, is a controlled-access toll road in southern Miami-Dade County, Florida. It extends 7 miles (11 km) northeast from the Homestead Extension of Florida's Turnpike (HEFT) in southwestern Kendall to SR 826 (Palmetto Expressway) in Glenvar Heights, allowing traffic from the far south of Miami-Dade County and the Florida Keys to move to more central regions of metropolitan Miami and vice versa, bypassing communities along US 1, while also permitting local access to the Kendall district. The road, named in honor of the long-serving coach of the Miami Dolphins NFL team, is maintained and tolled by the Greater Miami Expressway Agency (GMX). Contrary to the numbering plan of Florida State Roads, SR 874 is signed north–south.

== Route description ==
SR 874 begins at an interchange with the HEFT on the boundary of the communities of Three Lakes, Richmond Heights and Kendall, about 15 miles (24 km) southwest of Downtown Miami. The expressway is formed from the median lanes of the HEFT, and immediately turns to the northeast, passing under the HEFT's northbound lanes. Southbound HEFT traffic cannot access northbound SR 874; likewise, southbound SR 874 traffic cannot access the HEFT northbound. After turning to the northeast and entering Kendall, the six-laned Don Shula Expressway subsequently parallels CSX's Homestead Subdivision past predominantly residential neighborhoods for its entire route. SR 874 meets its first of three toll gantries about 1.4 miles (2.3 km) north of its southern terminus, just north of its former lone toll plaza.

About two miles (3.2 km) from SR 874's southern terminus, the expressway interchanges with Killian Parkway (SR 990) and Southwest 107th Avenue (SR 985) at a partial cloverleaf interchange. The Don Shula Expressway continues on for 1.1 miles (1.8 km), passing through another toll gantry, before reaching an interchange with Kendall Drive (SR 94). Almost immediately afterwards, SR 874 crosses the Snapper Creek Canal and enters the Sunset district. It then reaches the partial interchange with the Snapper Creek Expressway (SR 878); indeed, southbound motorists along the Don Shula Expressway who wish to exit to Kendall Drive are directed onto the westernmost portion of SR 878.

Once past the Snapper Creek Expressway, SR 874 features no interchanges for the remainder of its route. Just north of the bridge over Sunset Drive (SR 986), prior to 2014, motorists in both directions were provided with a separated lane to take their vehicles to if caught in an accident. One-quarter mile (400 m) past the former site of the accident investigation sites, the Don Shula Expressway swings north over the railroad, crossing over Galloway Road (SR 973) in the process, and resumes its northeasterly orientation, now forming the boundary between the communities of Olympia Heights, to the road's north, and Glenvar Heights, to the south. 0.6 miles (970 m) later, SR 874 passes through its third and final toll gantry, before reaching its northern terminus in a partial interchange with the Palmetto Expressway after another one mile (1.6 km). Like at its southern terminus, SR 874 forms the central lanes of SR 826 northbound; however, its interchange is integrated with SR 826's interchange with Bird Road (SR 976). Also like its southern terminus, there is no access for northbound SR 874 or SR 826 traffic to the other route's southbound counterpart.

== Tolls ==
SR 874's tolls are entirely electronic: cash cannot be accepted along its length. Payment is done either via SunPass transponders or via toll-by-plate billing, the latter of which attracts a higher cost. Three toll gantries are located along the Don Shula Expressway: the first between the HEFT and Killian Parkway, the second between Killian Parkway and Kendall Drive, and the last between the Snapper Creek and Palmetto Expressways. The relationship between the tolling points and interchanges along SR 874 and SR 878 is that all motorists are charged at least one toll for using the road; there are no "free sections". As of July 1, 2013, the cost for a two-axled vehicle to drive the entire length of SR 874 is $1.00 with a SunPass transponder, or $2.00 via the toll-by-plate program, with the two southern gantries charging $0.25 (SunPass) or $0.50 (toll-by-plate) each, and the northern one charging twice as much. Each additional axle on a vehicle attracts a surcharge equal to the cost of a two-axled vehicle for each gantry passed.

== History ==
The history of the Don Shula Expressway can be traced back to 1957 when, in planning for the Palmetto Expressway's routing, Dade County Commissioner Ralph Fossey proposed an alternative southern alignment of the expressway to follow the then Seaboard-owned railroad southwest from near Miller Drive (Southwest 56th Street) to Southwest 117th Avenue, before heading south to US 1 at Goulds, instead of heading due south to Kendall. While the Palmetto Expressway was built to its original plan in 1961, the concept of an expressway next to the Seaboard tracks south of Miller Drive, termed the South Dade Expressway, continued to feature in transportation plans over the next decade. By the middle of 1969, bonds for construction of the South Dade Expressway were being secured from the Turnpike Authority; however, plans for the expressway were revised and incorporated into wider plans involving the West Dade Expressway (what would become the HEFT) in 1970, which included a toll of ten cents and a shift of the South Dade Expressway to the northern side of the Seaboard railroad north of Galloway Road (Southwest 87th Avenue). Funding was secured in 1971, and a construction end-date was set for early 1973. This did not eventuate due to difficulties to acquire land for the expressway's right-of-way, resulting in the final section of the South Dade Expressway, between Kendall Drive and the Palmetto Expressway, opening at midday on July 31, 1975.

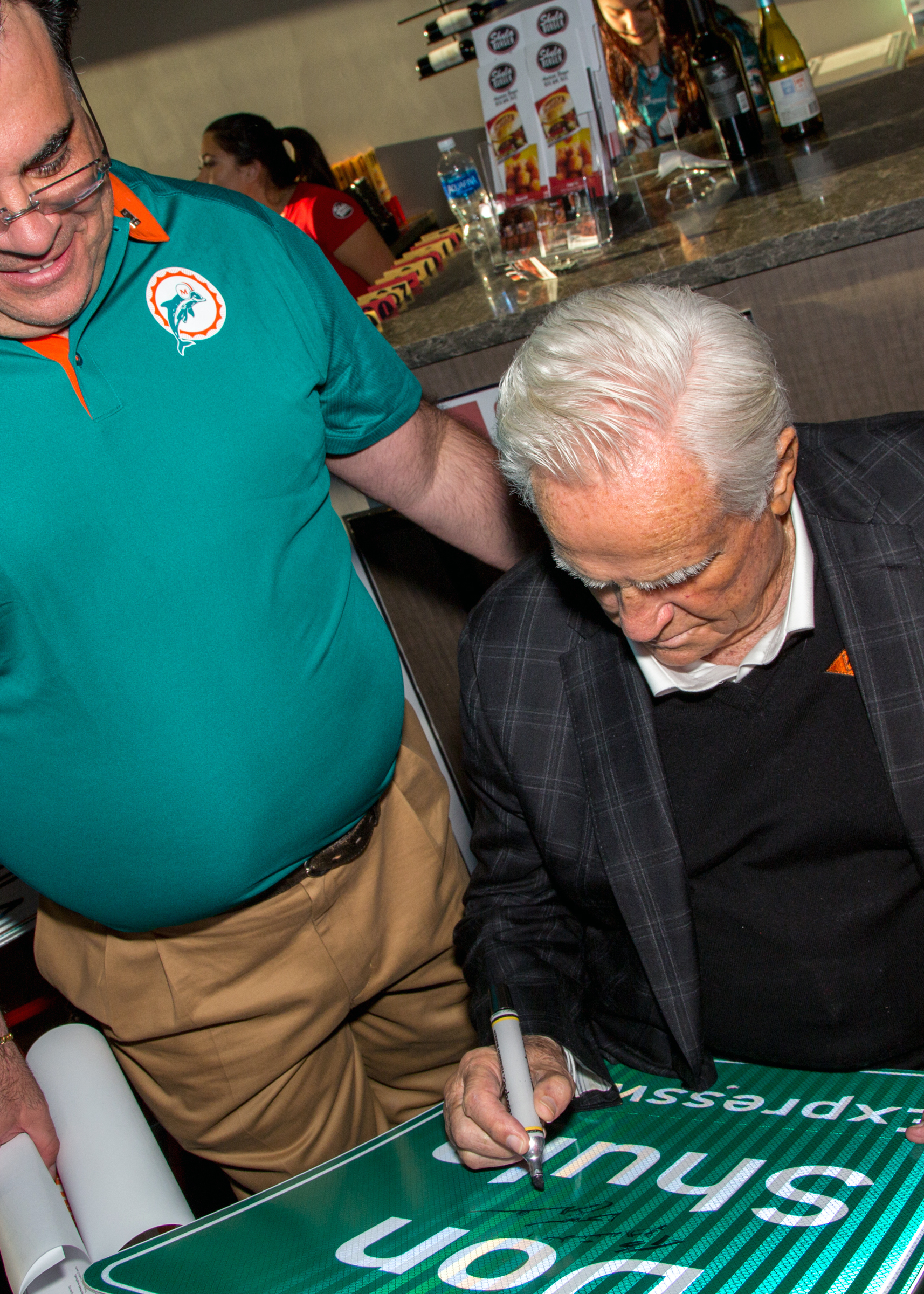
Former NFL Coach Don Shula autographs a "Don Shula Expressway" sign for a fan during an event in Pinecrest, Florida.

In 1983, the South Dade Expressway was renamed by the Florida Legislature to the Don Shula Expressway, in honor of the Hall of Fame head coach of the Miami Dolphins NFL team. Tolls along the Don Shula Expressway were collected at the southern toll plaza until July 17, 2010 when, as part of MDX's rollout of electronic tolling across its owned roads, the road was converted to open road tolling at the same time as the adjoining Snapper Creek Expressway. Initially, tolls were $0.25 for SunPass users at the southern gantries and $0.50 at the northern gantry, with a $0.15 surcharge for motorists using the toll-by-plate system at all gantries. The toll-by-plate rate increased on July 1, 2013, while the SunPass rate was unaffected.

== Future ==
As part of its long-term plans for the region, GMX is seeking to improve access to the Don Shula Expressway from its surrounding communities, particularly from the areas west of the HEFT. Notably, MDX has launched a project to build exit and entry ramps from SR 874 into the Three Lakes district west of its southern terminus, aiming to relieve congestion at the Southwest 120th Street and Coral Reef Drive (SR 992) interchanges with the HEFT by providing alternative access and egress of the area via SR 874. Studies to build the connection ran from 2010 until early 2012, in which six alternative routes for the ramps were suggested: the preferred route sees Southwest 128th Street widened east of Southwest 137th Avenue to four lanes, with flyovers from east of Southwest 122nd Avenue, heading over the HEFT/SR 874 interchange, to merge with SR 874 east of Southwest 117th Avenue. Construction began in April 2017, and was completed on September 10, 2021.

An additional project to improve connectivity with the Don Shula Expressway sees the construction of a partial diamond interchange between SR 874 and Sunset Drive (SR 986), so as to relieve congestion along SR 986 and improve access to the Sunset and neighboring districts. The interchange's ramps would permit movement only to and from SR 874 north of SR 986. GMX began preliminary studies of the project in 2009, but no timeline for construction has yet been published.

== Exit list ==
The entire route is in Miami-Dade County. All exits are unnumbered.

Location	mi	km	Destinations	Notes
Three Lakes	0.000	0.000	Florida's Turnpike Extension south	Exits 16 on Turnpike Extension
Three Lakes	0.350	0.563	SR 992 (Southwest 152nd Street) / SW 117th Avenue	Southbound exit only; other movements via Turnpike Extension exit 16
Three Lakes	0.950	1.529	Southwest 128th Street / Southwest 122nd Avenue	Southbound Exit and Northbound Entrance (Opened 2021)
Kendall	1.3	2.1	Toll gantry	
Kendall	2.276	3.663	SR 990 (Killian Parkway) / SR 985 north (Southwest 107th Avenue)	Southern terminus of SR 985. Access to MDC Kendall
Kendall	2.7	4.3	Toll gantry	
Kendall	3.661	5.892	SR 94 (Southwest 88th Street / Kendall Drive)	Access to Baptist Hospital of Miami, Baptist Children's Hospital
Sunset	4.306	6.930	SR 878 east	Northbound exit and southbound entrance; western terminus of SR 878
Sunset			SR 986 (Southwest 72nd Street)	Proposed interchange; Will be southbound exit northbound entrance
Olympia Heights	6.1	9.8	Toll gantry	
Glenvar Heights–Olympia Heights line	6.7	10.8	SR 976 (Southwest 40th Street / Bird Road)	Southbound exit is via SR 826
Glenvar Heights–Olympia Heights line	7.034	11.320	SR 826 north – Airport	
1.000 mi = 1.609 km; 1.000 km = 0.621 mi: Electronic toll collection; Incomplete access
