= Kendall Drive =

State highway in Florida, United States

State Road 94
- Southwest 88th Street / Kendall Drive
- SR 94 highlighted in red

Route information
- Maintained by FDOT
- Length: 10.700 mi (17.220 km) Kendall Drive continues east 2.5 miles (4.0 km)

Major junctions
- West end: SR 997 in The Hammocks
- Florida's Turnpike Extension in Kendall
- East end: US 1 in Kendall – Pinecrest

Location
- Country: United States
- State: Florida
- Counties: Miami-Dade

Highway system
- Florida State Highway System; Interstate; US; State; Former; Pre‑1945; Toll; Scenic
← US 94	→ I-95

Kendall Drive, also known as Southwest 88th Street and historically North Kendall Drive, runs for 13.3 miles (21.4 km) in an east–west orientation across mid-southern Miami-Dade County, Florida. The majority of Kendall Drive, between State Road 997 at The Hammocks and US 1 (State Road 5) on the Kendall–Pinecrest border, is signed as the 10.7-mile-long (17.2 km) State Road 94 (SR 94). The road serves as a major arterial road through the suburbs of the southern Miami metropolitan area, connecting its predominantly residential neighborhoods to shopping districts and to three freeways, allowing commuter travel.

== Route description ==
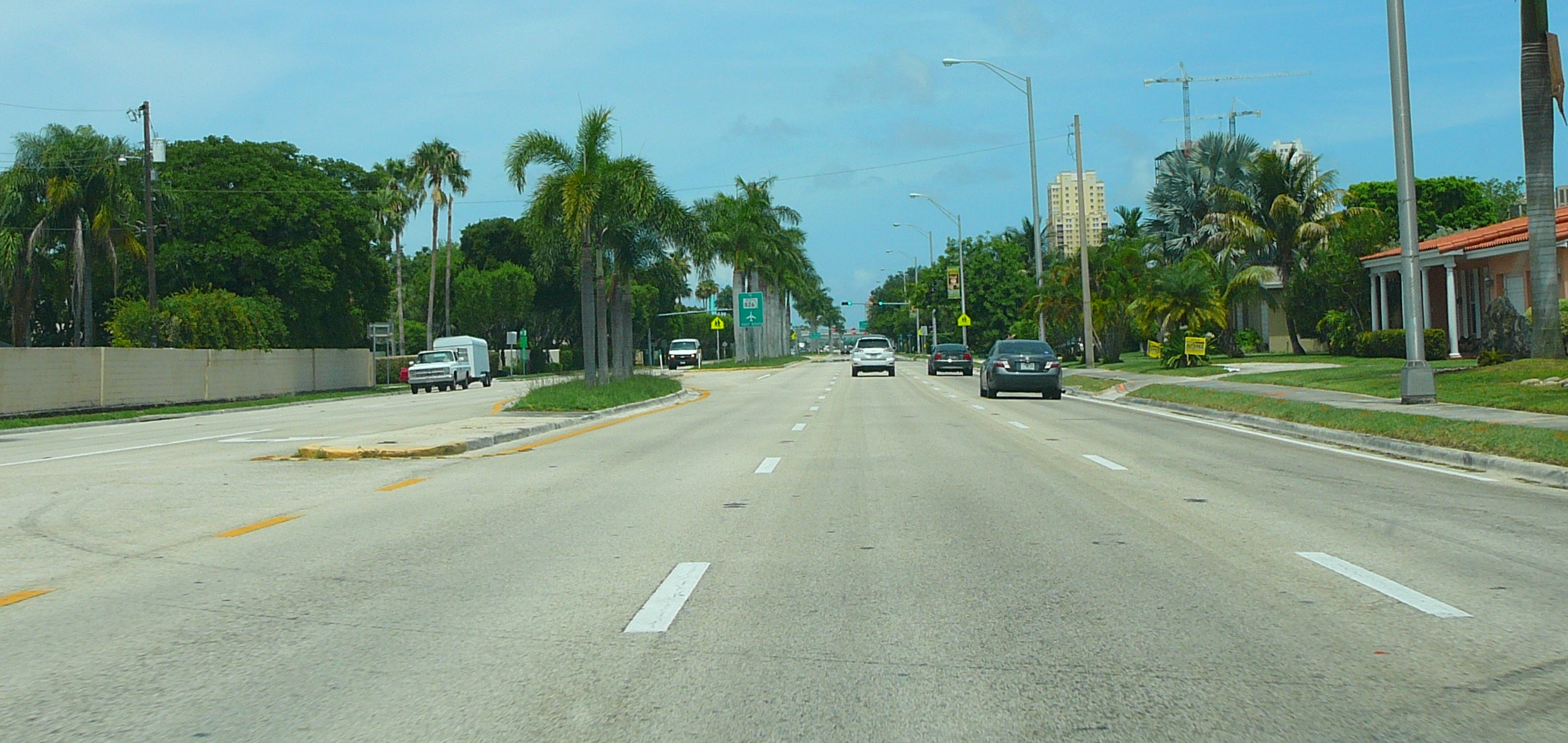
Kendall Drive (SR 94) eastbound near the Palmetto Expressway.

Kendall Drive (Southwest 88th Street locally) begins as a private road servicing a quarry just to the west of State Road 997, heading east. Upon reaching SR 997, the road gains the SR 94 designation and continues east through farmland as a four-laned divided road. From here, the road marks the northern boundary of The Hammocks as it first turns to the southeast and then immediately turns back eastwards, subsequently following this orientation for most of its remaining route. Just after it comes out of the curve, Kendall Drive enters suburbia with a shopping strip forming first along the right side of the road, the left following after crossing Southwest 167th Avenue. The road's width expands to six lanes by the time it crosses Southwest 162nd Avenue. At Southwest 157th Avenue, Kendall Drive forms the boundary between The Hammocks, to its south, and Kendall West, to its north. SR 94 passes between neighborhoods and by more shops for the next mile (1.6 km), reaching Southwest 147th Avenue where Kendall West's southern boundary is replaced by Kendale Lakes'. For the 1.8 miles (2.9 km), Kendall Drive passes between more neighborhoods, condominium complexes and by some local shopping malls before arriving at Lindgren Road (Southwest 137th Avenue), SR 825's northern terminus. Now running along the boundary between Kendale Lakes and The Crossings, Kendall Drive's surroundings grow more commercial as it approaches the Homestead Extension of Florida's Turnpike (HEFT) after 1.7 miles (2.7 km) with shopping malls and motels surrounding the interchange. As SR 94 passes under the HEFT, it enters its namesake locality of Kendall.

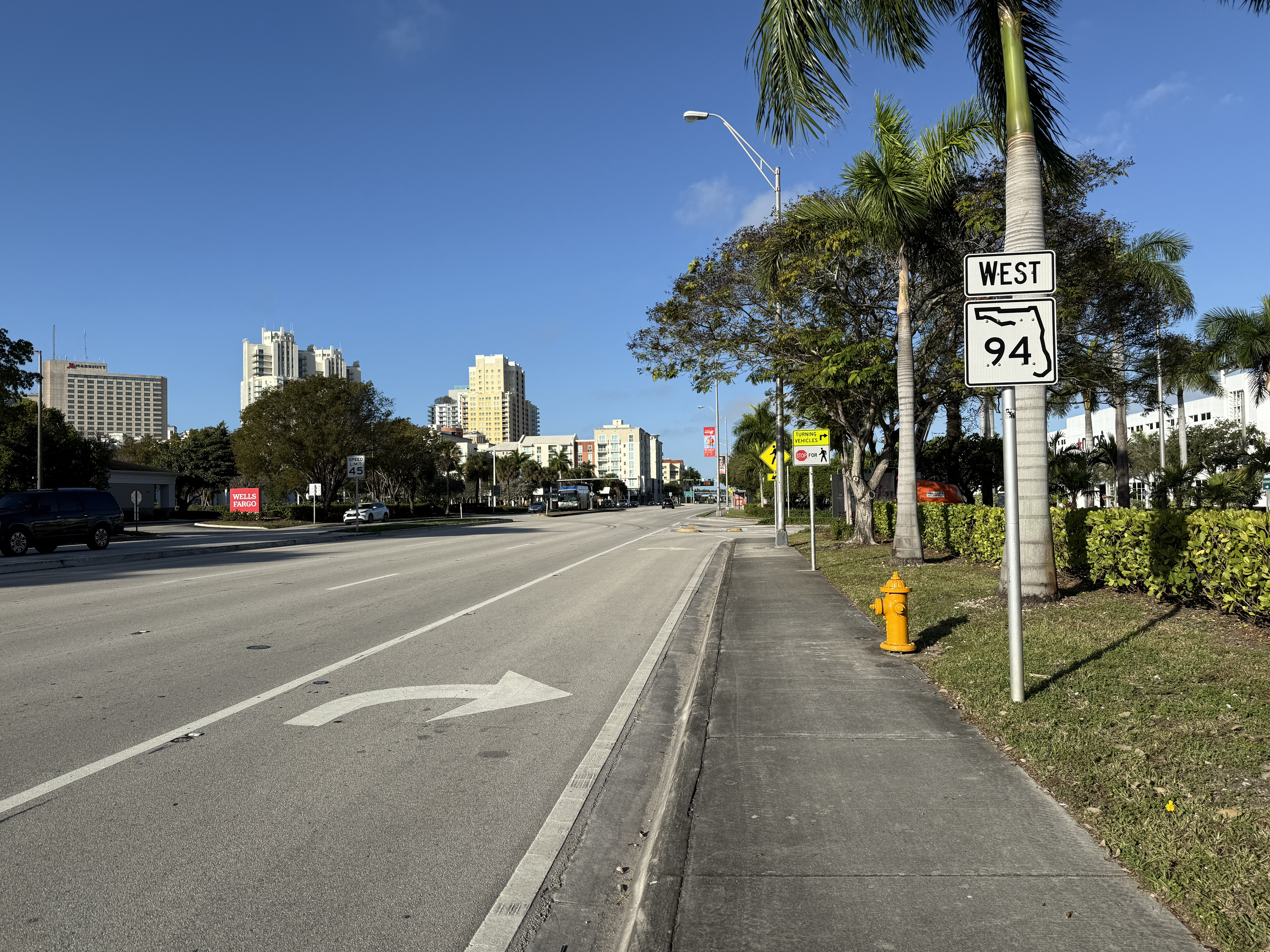
SR 94 westbound past its eastern terminus at US 1 in Kendall

Until it reaches Southwest 107th Avenue (SR 985), Kendall Drive is surrounded predominantly by condominium complexes; while past it, the road runs by houses on its 0.9-mile-long (1.4 km) run to the Don Shula Expressway (SR 874), crossing the former Seaboard Coast Line Railroad tracks just prior to the interchange. A similar neighborhood lies beyond the expressway underpass as SR 94 continues eastwards, though its surroundings are soon broken up by the Baptist Hospital of Miami to the road's south as it approaches Galloway Road (SR 973). More houses and the occasional condominium complex line Kendall Drive for the next mile, whereupon it interchanges with the Palmetto Expressway (SR 826). Beyond, the Dadeland Mall takes up the northern side of Kendall Drive for the next half-mile (0.8 km) while the southern side features mid-rise office and apartment buildings. Immediately after passing under the Metrorail tracks, SR 94 terminates at US 1 on the Kendall–Pinecrest boundary.

Kendall Drive and Southwest 88th Street continue east past the oblique junction with US 1 as a four-laned divided road, surrounded by condominiums, until it crosses Ludlam Road and narrows to a tree-lined two-laned undivided residential road as it passes Gulliver Preparatory School. Mansions and large-lot houses border the road to the south, with villas to the north as Kendall Drive continues eastwards, before turning more and more markedly to the southeast as it approaches the Snapper Creek Canal and Red Road (Southwest 57th Avenue). Southwest 88th Street takes a sharp dogleg to the left, sharing Red Road's bridge over the canal before continuing east again. Now running along a northern border of Coral Gables, Kendall Drive continues east past more houses and lakeside villas until it reaches its end at an intersection with Old Cutler Road.

== History ==
Like its eponymous community, Kendall Drive is named for Henry John Boughton Kendall, a trustee of the Florida Land and Mortgage Company which purchased the tract of land now situated between Southwest 88th and Southwest 104th Streets in 1883. Henry Kendall managed the fruit groves set up by the company in the area. Southwest 88th Street, the road along the northern end of the holdings, began to be referred to as "North" Kendall Drive, although the application of the "North" component of the name is applied inconsistently along the road's signage.

Until a series of truncations throughout the system of State Roads by the Florida Department of Transportation, SR 94 extended eastward to SR 959 at the intersection of Kendall Drive and Red Road (South 88th Street and West 57th Avenue) in Pinecrest; both State Roads were cut back to US 1 by 2001.

== Major intersections ==
The entire route is in Miami-Dade County.

Location	mi	km	Destinations	Notes
The Hammocks	0.000	0.000	SR 997 (Southwest 177th Avenue / Krome Avenue)	Western terminus
The Hammocks–Kendale Lakes– The Crossings tripoint	3.962	6.376	SR 825 south (Southwest 137th Avenue / Lindgren Road)	
Kendale Lakes–The Crossings– Kendall tripoint	5.67	9.12	Florida's Turnpike Extension (SR 821) – Orlando, Homestead	Turnpike Exit 20
Kendall	7.128	11.471	SR 985 (Southwest 107th Avenue) – MDC Kendall Campus	
Kendall	8.04	12.94	SR 874 / SR 878 east – South Miami, Homestead	
Kendall	9.145	14.717	SR 973 (Southwest 87th Avenue / Galloway Road)	
Kendall	10.18	16.38	SR 826 to US 1 south – International Airport	interchange; no access from SR 94 west to SR 826 south
Kendall–Pinecrest line	10.700	17.220	US 1 (Pinecrest Parkway / South Dixie Highway)	Eastern terminus Kendall Drive continues east
1.000 mi = 1.609 km; 1.000 km = 0.621 mi

== See also ==
- List of state highways in Florida
- List of highways numbered 94
