= Sunset Drive =

Arterial road in Florida

State Road 986
- Southwest 72nd Street / Sunset Drive
- SR 986 highlighted in red

Route information
- Maintained by FDOT and South Miami
- Length: 5.883 mi (9.468 km) Sunset Drive extends 12.5 mi (20.1 km) total

Major junctions
- West end: Kendale Lakes
- SR 826 in Glenvar Heights
- East end: US 1 in South Miami

Location
- Country: United States
- State: Florida
- Counties: Miami-Dade

Highway system
- Florida State Highway System; Interstate; US; State; Former; Pre‑1945; Toll; Scenic
← SR 985	→ SR 988

Sunset Drive, also known as Southwest 72nd Street, is a 12.5-mile-long (20.1 km) east–west arterial road traversing the southwestern suburbs of Miami, Florida, from the northwestern portions of the Kendall area to Coral Gables. A central portion of Sunset Drive is maintained by the Florida Department of Transportation as State Road 986 (SR 986), which runs from the Homestead Extension (HEFT) underpass to Southwest 69th Avenue and is signed through South Miami to US 1.

== Route description ==
=== Western section ===
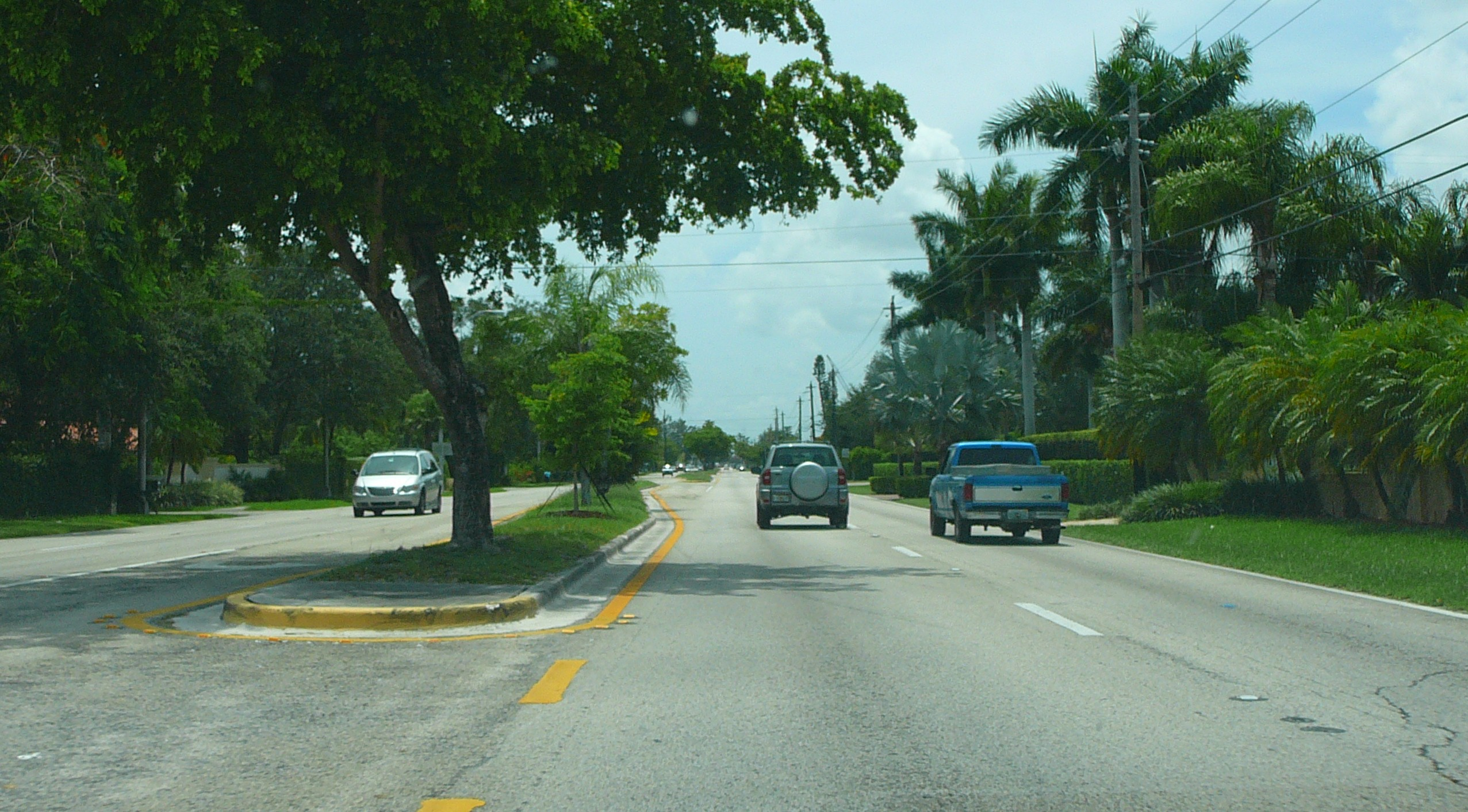
State Road 986 westbound west of SR 826

Southwest 72nd Street begins as a private dirt road accessing farmland in unincorporated Miami-Dade County, north of The Hammocks and west of Kendall West. The road heads east and, upon reaching 167th Avenue, it becomes a paved four-laned divided road. Sunset Drive then continues east past residential neighborhoods for one mile (1.6 km), reaching a collection of neighborhood shopping centers and the western edge of the Kendall West community at Southwest 157th Avenue. From here to its eastern terminus, Southwest 72nd Street is given the designation of Marjory Stoneman Douglas Sunset Drive.

After another mile (1.6 km), and after passing by more residential neighborhoods, Sunset Drive crosses Southwest 147th Avenue and enters the unincorporated Kendale Lakes. The road passes one block to the south of the Miccosukee Golf & Country Club, and continues east between the backs of residential neighborhoods for another two miles (3.2 km), older than those lying to the west, with the only break being Miami Sunset Senior High. After crossing Southwest 127th Avenue, Sunset Drive's character changes as it passes by churches, schools, large-lot houses and market gardens until it reaches the HEFT.

=== State Road 986 section ===
The locations of both termini of State Road 986 are unclear, with some commercial mapping and even Florida Department of Transportation (FDOT) material showing the western terminus of SR 986 at Southwest 127th Avenue and the eastern terminus at either the South Dixie Highway (US 1) or Red Road. According to the FDOT road inventory, the western terminus of SR 986 lies where Sunset Drive passes under the HEFT without an interchange, with the section of road west to Southwest 127th Avenue acknowledged as lying off the Florida State Highway System.

East of the HEFT underpass, SR 986 leaves Kendale Lakes and enters the Kendall district proper, cutting across its northwestern corner. Sunset Drive first passes a small shopping district and then goes between two residential neighborhoods. As SR 986 approaches Southwest 107th Avenue (SR 985), 1.1 miles (1.8 km) east of the HEFT, the road enters another shopping district. Once past SR 985, Sunset Drive almost-immediately crosses the Snapper Creek Canal and enters the eponymous community of Sunset. SR 986 then passes a mixture of houses, strip malls, commercial services and churches for the next 1.7 miles (2.7 km), whereupon it crosses a CSX railroad and passes under the Don Shula Expressway (SR 874) without an interchange. After another one-quarter mile (400 m) of strip malls, SR 986 crosses Galloway Road (SR 973) and enters the community of Glenvar Heights. East of Galloway Road, SR 986 gains a leafy residential character, reaching the Palmetto Expressway (SR 826) interchange after one mile (1.6 km). SR 986 carries on east through more leafy neighborhoods for another 0.7 miles (1.1 km). Here, the SR 986 designation stops at Southwest 69th Avenue, the boundary between Glenvar Heights and the incorporated city of South Miami. Like at its western terminus, the FDOT inventory recognises Sunset Drive as far east as Red Road (approximately 1.3 miles (2.1 km)) as lying off the State Highway System.

=== Eastern section ===
Sunset Drive continues east from SR 986's eastern terminus through leafy neighborhoods of western South Miami. The road's character changes once it passes Southwest 63rd Avenue, as Sunset Drive begins to enter South Miami's central business district, passing by low-rise apartment buildings, multi-storeyed office complexes, and the South Miami Hospital. At Southwest 62nd Avenue, eastbound motorists on Sunset Drive wishing to head north along US 1 are encouraged by signage to detour along it, while Sunset Drive continues east for one-quarter mile (400 m) through the civic heart of South Miami, including a section of road paved with red brick near the city hall. The road then passes under the elevated Metrorail tracks, just to the south of South Miami Metrorail station, and immediately meets the South Dixie Highway (US 1) at an oblique intersection.

East of US 1, Sunset Drive scales down to become an undivided two-laned shopping street for the next two blocks, reaching Red Road (Southwest 57th Avenue) after 1/4 mile (400 m). On the other side, Sunset Drive leaves South Miami and forms the boundary between Coral Gables, to the north, and an unincorporated section of Miami-Dade County to the south. After passing between shops on the northern side of the road and houses on the southern side, Sunset Drive enters an opulent, leafy residential neighborhood, eventually losing its kerbing, and crossing entirely into Coral Gables about 1.2 miles (1.9 km) later. After about 0.4 miles (640 m), Sunset Drive terminates at Cartagena Plaza, a traffic circle that also features LeJeune Road's southern terminus and Old Cutler Road's northeastern terminus.

== History ==
In 1996, the Florida State Legislature passed a resolution renaming SR 986 as Marjory Stoneman Douglas Sunset Drive.

Until 1997, its eastern terminus was three blocks further to the east of US 1 at Red Road, to intersect with a since-truncated SR 959 on the South Miami-Coral Gables boundary.

== Major intersections ==
The entire route is in Miami-Dade County.

Location	mi	km	Destinations	Notes
Kendale Lakes	0.000	0.000	west end of state maintenance	
Kendall	1.113	1.791	SR 985 (Southwest 107th Avenue)	
Sunset–Glenvar Heights line	3.113	5.010	SR 973 (Southwest 87th Avenue / Galloway Road)	
Glenvar Heights	4.16	6.69	SR 826 – International Airport	interchange
Glenvar Heights–South Miami line	4.895	7.878	Southwest 69th Avenue	east end of state maintenance
South Miami	5.883	9.468	US 1 (South Dixie Highway / SR 5)	no left turn eastbound (signs point via Southwest 62nd Avenue and Southwest 70th Street)
1.000 mi = 1.609 km; 1.000 km = 0.621 mi
