= Coral Reef Drive =

Road in Miami-Dade County, Florida, US

Coral Reef Drive
- State Road 992; Southwest 152nd Street
- SR 992 highlighted in red

Route information
- Maintained by FDOT
- Length: 9.6 mi (15.4 km) 2.642 miles (4.252 km) as SR 992
- Existed: 1983 (as SR 992)–present

Major junctions
- West end: Southwest 162nd Avenue in Richmond West
- Florida's Turnpike Extension in Palmetto Estates
- East end: US 1 in Palmetto Bay

Location
- Country: United States
- State: Florida
- Counties: Miami-Dade

Highway system
- Florida State Highway System; Interstate; US; State; Former; Pre‑1945; Toll; Scenic
← SR 990	→ SR 994

Coral Reef Drive, also known as Southwest 152nd Street, is a 9.6-mile-long (15.4 km) main east–west road south of Miami in Miami-Dade County, Florida, United States. It serves to connect the communities of Country Walk and Richmond Heights with Palmetto Bay. State Road 992 (SR 992) is designated along the 2.462-mile-long (3.962 km) section of Coral Reef Drive between the Homestead Extension of Florida's Turnpike and US 1.

== Route description ==
=== Western section ===
Coral Reef Drive begins along the southern edge of a housing estate at Southwest 162nd Avenue in Country Walk, though an unmarked dirt road continues west to SR 997 through agricultural fields. After crossing Southwest 157th Avenue, Coral Reef Drive forms the boundary between Country Walk and Richmond West. Here, it also becomes a palm-lined road, travelling along the back of houses on either side, increasing in width to four lanes after crossing Naranja Road (Southwest 147th Avenue). After crossing a canal, Coral Reef Drive continues to pass in between neighborhoods until it reaches a couple of small shopping malls and Lindgren Road (Southwest 137th Avenue), a northern portion of which is designated as SR 825. East of here, Coral Reef Drive passes along the southern boundary of Three Lakes; while to its south lies the former Naval Air Station Richmond site, now taken up by the South Campus of the University of Miami, the Gold Coast Railroad Museum and Zoo Miami. After passing a shopping mall at Three Lakes' eastern end, Coral Reef Drive meets the Homestead Extension of Florida's Turnpike, gaining the SR 992 designation.

=== State Road 992 section ===
State Road 992 begins at the interchange of Coral Reef Drive with the Homestead Extension of Florida's Turnpike, and proceeds east as a four-laned divided road, immediately forming the boundary between Richmond Heights and Palmetto Estates, and continues on through residential neighborhoods. In sections along Coral Reef Drive's northern side lie frontage roads, allowing access to side streets and some residential properties; however, most houses continue to back on to the road like in areas to the west of the Turnpike. In eastern Richmond Heights, SR 992 passes the Coral Reef Senior High School, and then forms the northern boundary of the Palmetto Golf Course as it leaves Richmond Heights on its left and meets the southernmost tip of Kendall. After passing the Jackson South Community Hospital (formerly known as Deering Hospital), SR 992 crosses the South Miami-Dade Busway and terminates at US 1, with Coral Reef Drive extending eastwards beyond the highway into Palmetto Bay.

=== Eastern section ===
As Coral Reef Drive crosses US 1, it enters the village of Palmetto Bay, and continues eastwards as a two-laned suburban street through residential areas. After a couple of miles, Coral Reef Drive intersects with Old Cutler Road, and then continues a short distance to terminate at the southern end of Ludlam Road, with its pavement extending east as Paradise Point Drive into a gated community on the shores of Biscayne Bay. The oolitic limestone & coral rock wall from 89th Ave. to 86th Ave. on the southern side, was built in 1919. It is a historic landmark designated by Miami-Dade County's Office of Historic Preservation.

== History ==
SR 992 was signed in 1983.

In 2018, the Florida Department of Transportation (FDOT) completed a project which improved the road from the Turnpike to U.S. Route 1.

== Major intersections ==
The entire route is in Miami-Dade County.

Location	mi	km	Destinations	Notes
Richmond West	0.0	0.0	Southwest 162nd Avenue	Continues west as a dirt road
Richmond West–Three Lakes line	2.6	4.2	SR 825 (Lindgren Road)	Southwest 137th Avenue
Three Lakes	4.6	7.4	Southwest 117th Avenue	West end of SR 992
Palmetto Estates–Richmond Heights line	4.7	7.6	Florida's Turnpike Extension – Orlando, Homestead	Exit 16 on Turnpike Extension
Palmetto Estates–Kendall– Palmetto Bay tripoint	7.1	11.4	US 1 (Dixie Highway)	East end of SR 992
Palmetto Bay	9.0	14.5	Old Cutler Road	
Palmetto Bay	9.6	15.4	Southwest 67th Avenue	Continues east to a dead end
1.000 mi = 1.609 km; 1.000 km = 0.621 mi: Electronic toll collection; Route transition
