= Glenvar Heights, Florida =

- Census-designated place
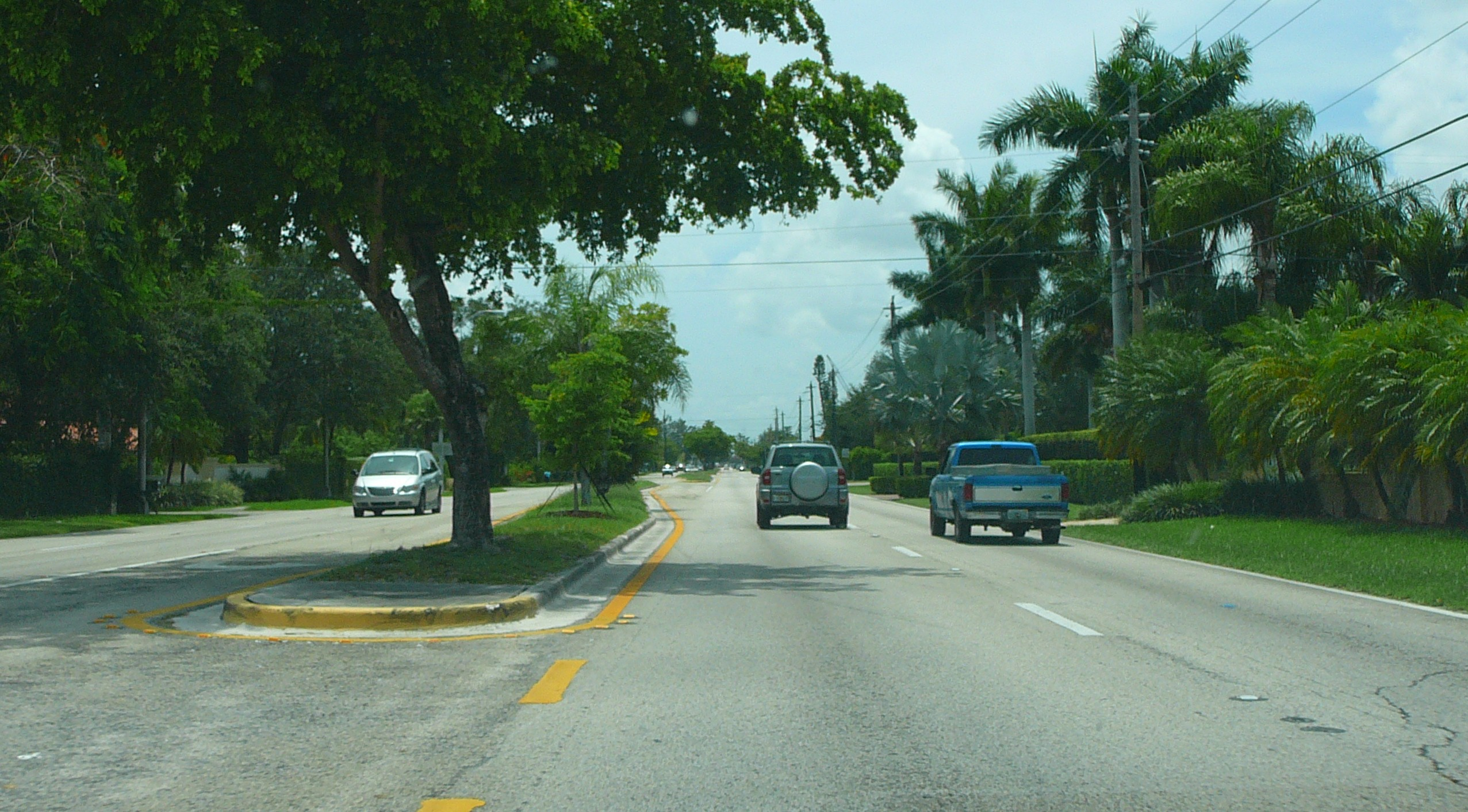
- Sunset Drive westbound, just west of the Palmetto Expressway in Glenvar Heights, July 2008

- Location in Miami-Dade County and the state of Florida

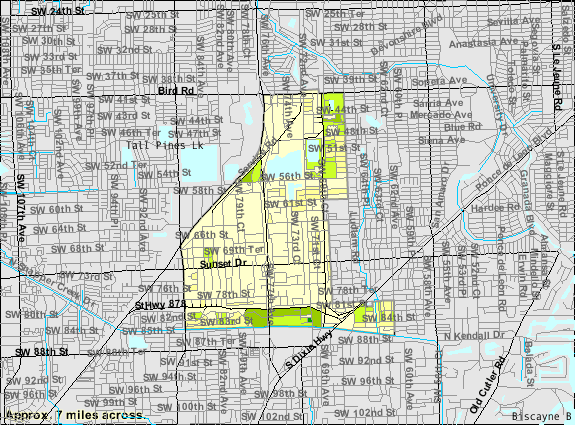
- U.S. Census Bureau map showing CDP boundaries
- Coordinates: 25°42′32″N 80°18′56″W
- Country: United States
- State: Florida
- County: Miami-Dade

Area
  - Total: 4.27 sq mi (11.07 km^{2})
  - Land: 4.08 sq mi (10.56 km^{2})
  - Water: 0.20 sq mi (0.51 km^{2})
- Elevation: 10 ft (3.0 m)

Population (2020)
  - Total: 20,786
  - Density: 5,097.0/sq mi (1,967.96/km^{2})
- Time zone: UTC-5 (Eastern (EST))
  - Summer (DST): UTC-4 (EDT)
- ZIP Codes: 33143, 33155 (Miami)
- Area codes: 305, 786, 645
- FIPS code: 12-26100
- GNIS feature ID: 2402529

Glenvar Heights is a census-designated place (CDP) and neighborhood in Miami-Dade County, Florida, United States. It is part of the Miami metropolitan area of South Florida. The population was 20,786 at the 2020 US census, up from 16,898 in 2010 US census.

== Geography ==
Glenvar Heights is located 10 miles (16 km) southwest of downtown Miami. It is bordered to the north by Coral Terrace, to the east by South Miami, to the southeast by Pinecrest, to the south by Kendall, to the west by Sunset and Olympia Heights, and to the northwest by Westchester.

According to the United States Census Bureau, the CDP has a total area of 4.3 square miles (11 km^{2}), of which 4.1 square miles (11 km^{2}) are land and 0.2 square miles (0.52 km^{2}), or 4.63%, are water.

== Demographics ==
Historical population
Census	Pop.	Note	%±
1980	13,216		—
1990	14,823		12.2%
2000	16,243		9.6%
2010	16,898		4.0%
2020	20,786		23.0%
U.S. Decennial Census

=== Racial and ethnic composition ===
Glenvar Heights CDP, Florida – Racial and ethnic composition Note: the US Census treats Hispanic/Latino as an ethnic category. This table excludes Latinos from the racial categories and assigns them to a separate category. Hispanics/Latinos may be of any race.
Race / Ethnicity (NH = Non-Hispanic)	Pop 2010	Pop 2020	% 2010	% 2020
White (NH)	4,558	4,177	26.97%	20.10%
Black or African American (NH)	425	466	2.52%	2.24%
Native American or Alaska Native (NH)	8	18	0.05%	0.09%
Asian (NH)	454	955	2.69%	4.59%
Pacific Islander or Native Hawaiian (NH)	4	1	0.02%	0.00%
Some other race (NH)	52	139	0.31%	0.67%
Mixed race or Multiracial (NH)	156	434	0.92%	2.09%
Hispanic or Latino (any race)	11,241	14,596	66.52%	70.22%
Total	16,898	20,786	100.00%	100.00%

=== 2020 census ===
As of the 2020 census, Glenvar Heights had a population of 20,786. The median age was 41.1 years. 15.2% of residents were under the age of 18 and 18.9% of residents were 65 years of age or older. For every 100 females there were 87.0 males, and for every 100 females age 18 and over there were 84.1 males age 18 and over.

100.0% of residents lived in urban areas, while 0.0% lived in rural areas.

There were 9,707 households in Glenvar Heights, of which 21.0% had children under the age of 18 living in them. Of all households, 35.8% were married-couple households, 21.8% were households with a male householder and no spouse or partner present, and 34.8% were households with a female householder and no spouse or partner present. About 36.1% of all households were made up of individuals and 13.7% had someone living alone who was 65 years of age or older.

There were 4,275 families residing in the CDP.

There were 11,002 housing units, of which 11.8% were vacant. The homeowner vacancy rate was 1.2% and the rental vacancy rate was 14.1%.

Racial composition as of the 2020 census
Race	Number	Percent
White	7,621	36.7%
Black or African American	535	2.6%
American Indian and Alaska Native	69	0.3%
Asian	975	4.7%
Native Hawaiian and Other Pacific Islander	3	0.0%
Some other race	1,661	8.0%
Two or more races	9,922	47.7%
Hispanic or Latino (of any race)	14,596	70.2%

=== 2010 census ===
As of the 2010 United States census, there were 16,898 people, 6,709 households, and 3,874 families residing in the CDP.

=== 2000 census ===
As of the census of 2000, there were 16,243 people, 7,243 households, and 3,947 families residing in the CDP. The population density was 3,858.5 inhabitants per square mile (1,489.8/km^{2}). There were 7,591 housing units at an average density of 1,803.2 per square mile (696.2/km^{2}). The racial makeup of the CDP was 87.71% White (37.9% were Non-Hispanic White), 3.00% African American, 0.19% Native American, 2.91% Asian, 0.06% Pacific Islander, 3.42% from other races, and 2.72% from two or more races. Hispanic or Latino of any race were 55.46% of the population.

As of 2000, there were 7,243 households, out of which 23.1% had children under the age of 18 living with them, 38.9% were married couples living together, 11.6% had a female householder with no husband present, and 45.5% were non-families. 34.9% of all households were made up of individuals, and 9.5% had someone living alone who was 65 years of age or older. The average household size was 2.24 and the average family size was 2.95.

In 2000, in the CDP, the population was spread out, with 18.2% under the age of 18, 11.1% from 18 to 24, 33.7% from 25 to 44, 23.2% from 45 to 64, and 13.7% who were 65 years of age or older. The median age was 37 years. For every 100 females, there were 87.6 males. For every 100 females age 18 and over, there were 84.8 males.

In 2000, the median income for a household in the CDP was $40,209, and the median income for a family was $53,279. Males had a median income of $35,867 versus $30,510 for females. The per capita income for the CDP was $27,473. About 7.7% of families and 12.7% of the population were below the poverty line, including 10.7% of those under age 18 and 11.8% of those age 65 or over.

As of 2000, speakers of Spanish as a first language accounted for 60.96% of residents, while English made up 35.18%, French was at 1.01%, Arabic at 0.60%, and Portuguese consisted of 0.54% of the population.

== Transportation ==
The Miami Metrorail Dadeland North station straddles the border of Glenvar Heights and Kendall CDPs.

The Don Shula Expressway Toll Road makes up the northeastern border of Glenvar Heights. Additionally, the Snapper Creek Expressway runs through Glenvar Heights in the south, intersecting with US Route 1 in the southeast corner of the CDP, and the Palmetto Expressway passes through the center of the neighborhood.

== Education ==
Miami-Dade County Public Schools operates public schools.

South Miami Middle School and South Miami K-8 Center are adjacent to, but not in, Glenvar Heights.

South Miami Senior High School is in Glenvar Heights.

St. Thomas the Apostle School of the Roman Catholic Archdiocese of Miami is in Glenvar Heights.
