= Ludlam Road =

Miami Florida road

- West 67th Avenue
- Length: 21.8 mi (35.1 km); Two non-contiguous segments interrupted by the Tamiami Canal
- Location: Miami-Dade County, Florida, United States
- South end: SR 992 / South 152nd Street in Palmetto Bay
- North end: SR 854 / North 202nd Street in Miami Gardens

Construction
- Inauguration: 1914

Ludlam Road, also West 67th Avenue, is a 21.8-mile (35.1 km) north–south street that runs west of downtown Miami in Miami-Dade County, Florida.

== Route description ==
The southern terminus of Ludlam Road/W 67th Avenue is at the Charles Deering Estate at Coral Reef Drive. It commences here north through the village of Palmetto Bay, until crossing South 136th Street (Howard Drive) where it enters the village of Pinecrest.

It is the main north–south street in the village of Pinecrest, almost evenly bisecting the village.

It exits the village of Pinecrest after crossing Snapper Creek (Canal C-2) a short distance north of Kendall Drive (South 88th Street/SR 94), and continues north into unincorporated Miami-Dade County for a short distance until it enters the city of South Miami at South 80th Street.

At Southwest 60th Street it borders South Miami on the east, and unincorporated Miami-Dade County on the west. At South 48th Street it enters unincorporated Miami-Dade County.

It continues north through the community of South Coral Terrace until it enters the city of Miami after crossing South 8th Street (Tamiami Trail).

It dead-ends at Lake Mahar, a short distance north of Tamiami Canal Road in Miami.

It continues inside the Miami International Airport at North 22nd Street, going north following the perimeter of the airport until it ends at North 36th Street.

It continues at North 38th Street in the city of Miami Springs, going north until it becomes Crane Avenue at Thrush Avenue.

It continues in Hialeah at US 27 (Okeechobee Road), going north through Hialeah as Hialeah's West 12th Avenue (Milander Road) until it crosses the Gratigny Parkway and North 138th Street (Miami grid) or West 84th Street (Hialeah grid) and enters the incorporated town of Miami Lakes.

It continues north through Miami Lakes (again as Ludlam Road) as the main north–south street until it exits Miami Lakes at North 167th Street (Service Road to the Palmetto Expressway).

It continues north through unincorporated Miami-Dade County until it crosses into Broward County at North 202nd Street (Honey Hill Drive) and becomes Flamingo Road.
