= Red Road (Miami) =

Street in Miami-Dade County, Florida, United States of America

- West 57th Avenue
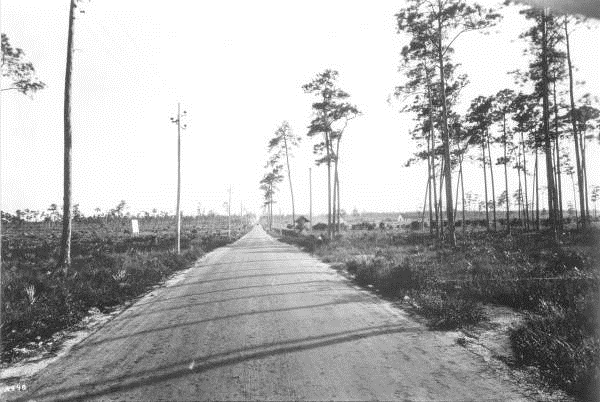
- Red Road in Coral Gables, 1921
- Maintained by: FDOT
- Length: 20.6 mi (33.2 km); Two non-contiguous segments interrupted by Miami International Airport
- Location: Miami-Dade, Broward
- South end: South 136th Street / Howard Drive in Coral Gables
- North end: SR 823 in Miramar

Construction
- Inauguration: 1921

Red Road, also known as West 57th Avenue, is a 20.6-mile (33.2 km) main north-south street running west of downtown Miami in Miami-Dade County, Florida and into Broward County. Red Road is signed as State Road 959 from U.S. 1 to the south end of the Miami International Airport, and State Road 823 from U.S. 27 to the Broward County line.

== Route description ==
=== Southern section ===
The southern terminus is at South 136th Street (Howard Drive) in Gables by the Sea, with the incorporated village of Pinecrest to the northwest corner and the city of Coral Gables to the east and south. Red Road goes north through a residential area until it dead ends at Campamento Avenue in Coral Gables. It resumes just south of Old Cutler Road at the Gulliver Academy campus' west end. Red Road and Old Cutler Road are cosigned as they head north for a short distance until Old Cutler Road veers east.

Red Road continues north, skirting the east side of Pinecrest as West 57th Avenue, roughly dividing it from Coral Gables until it crosses Kendall Drive (South 88th Street/SR 94) where it divides the city of South Miami to the west from a plot of unincorporated Miami-Dade County to the east.

North of Sunset Drive (South 72nd Street/SR 986) it divides the city of South Miami from Coral Gables.

State Road 959 begins at the intersection with Red Road and US 1 (South Dixie Highway), with SR 959 heading north, going through the southwestern end of the University of Miami campus, and then through residential areas, as it acts as the dividing line between Coral Gables to its east and South Miami and patches of unincorporated Miami-Dade County to the west between US 1 and SR 976 (Bird Road). North of Bird Road, Red Road continues through the residential sections of Coral Gables, and enters the residential areas of West Miami, crossing US 41 (Tamiami Trail). SR 959 then enters Miami, intersecting SR 968 (Flagler Street). North of NW 5th Street, Red Road becomes more commercial as it approaches the airport area, with a major shopping center and hotel at the intersection with NW 7th Street. SR 959 then crosses a canal and has an interchange with the Dolphin Expressway (SR 836), with the road terminating just north of the interchange at a dead end intersection with North 12th Street/Perimeter Road, just south of the Miami International Airport runway. This is also the end of the southern segment of Red Road.

=== Northern section ===
The road continues on the north side of Miami International Airport at North 36th Street and runs through the city of Miami Springs as Curtiss Parkway, their main north-south road, until it ends at Hunting Lodge Drive where Curtiss Parkway curves northeast.

At the northside of the Miami Canal at Okeechobee Road (US 27), Red Road resumes and runs through the city of Hialeah as their West 4th Avenue and signed as SR 823. It exits Hialeah when it crosses West 84th Street (Hialeah grid) or North 135th Street (Miami-Dade County grid) and again becomes Northwest 57th Avenue.

It continues north dividing the incorporated town of Miami Lakes to the west from Opa-locka Airport and the city of Miami Gardens to the east until it crosses the Palmetto Expressway (SR 826) where it continues to run north through unincorporated Miami-Dade County.

North of North 202nd Street (Honey Hill Drive) it divides Broward County and the city of Miramar to the west with unincorporated Miami-Dade County to the east, until it fully enters Broward County and Miramar just south of the Homestead Extension of Florida's Turnpike (State Road 821).

It continues north into Broward County and Miramar for a short distance, curving northwest starting at the intersection with Miramar Parkway, and merges onto Flamingo Road.

== History ==
When George Merrick made plans for the layout of Coral Gables in the 1920s he intended Red Road to be the western boundary of his planned city. The east–west Coral Way (SR 972), the northeast-southwest South Dixie Highway (soon to be designated US 1), and the north–south Ponce de Leon Boulevard were intended to be main throughways, and the Tamiami Trail (soon to be part of US 94, which would in turn be folded into US 41 in 1949) was planned to be the northern boundary.

Red Road gets its name from the color of the mark Merrick made when he drew the road on his planning map; similarly, an east–west street was drawn in with a blue pencil and was named Blue Road.

The section of Red Road between Killian Drive and the Miami International Airport received its FDOT of SR 959 designation in 1980. Its original configuration was 2.7-mile (4.3 km) longer as it stretched southward to the intersection of Red Road and Southwest 111th Street (Killian Drive), where it met the eastern end of SR 990 just outside the parking lot of the original Parrot Jungle, a major tourist attraction. Between 1995 and 2001, FDOT truncated several State Roads in Miami-Dade County, and both SR 959 and SR 990 were cut back to terminate at US 1.

== Major intersections ==
| County | Location | mi | km | Destinations | Notes |
|---|---|---|---|---|---|
| Miami-Dade | Coral Gables | 0.000 | 0.000 | Old Cutler Road | |
| Miami-Dade | Coral Gables | 0.887 | 1.427 | Killian Parkway | Southwest 112th Street; former SR 990 |
| Miami-Dade | Coral Gables | 2.420 | 3.895 | Kendall Drive | Southwest 88th Street; former SR 94 |
| Miami-Dade | South Miami–Coral Gables line | 3.440 | 5.536 | Sunset Drive | Southwest 72nd street; former SR 986 |
| Miami-Dade | South Miami–Coral Gables line | 3.657 | 5.885 | US 1 (Dixie Highway) | |
| Miami-Dade | Bird Road–Coral Gables line | 5.480 | 8.819 | SR 976 (Bird Road) | Southwest 40th Street |
| Miami-Dade | Bird Road–Coral Gables line | 6.480 | 10.429 | Coral Way | Southwest 24th Street; former SR 972 |
| Miami-Dade | West Miami | 7.524 | 12.109 | US 41 (Southwest 8th Street) | Tamiami Trail |
| Miami-Dade | Miami | 8.028 | 12.920 | SR 968 (Flagler Street) | |
| Miami-Dade | | 8.916– 8.991 | 14.349– 14.470 | SR 836 to I-95 / SR 826 / Florida's Turnpike Extension – Airport | |
| Miami-Dade | | 9.047 | 14.560 | Perimeter Road | Northern terminus of SR 959 |
| Miami-Dade | Gap in route | | | | |
| Miami-Dade | Hialeah | 0.000 | 0.000 | US 27 (Okeechobee Road) | Southern terminus of SR 823 |
| Miami-Dade | Hialeah | 0.758 | 1.220 | SR 934 (Hialeah Expressway) | West 21st Street (Northwest 74th Street) |
| Miami-Dade | Palm Springs | 2.540 | 4.088 | SR 932 (West 49th Street) | Northwest 103rd Street |
| Miami-Dade | Miami Lakes | 4.483– 4.645 | 7.215– 7.475 | SR 924 to I-75 / SR 826 | |
| Miami-Dade | Miami Lakes | 4.754 | 7.651 | SR 916 (West 84th Street) | Northwest 135th Street |
| Miami-Dade | Miami Lakes | 6.566– 6.611 | 10.567– 10.639 | SR 826 to Florida's Turnpike – Airport | Interchange via Northwest 167th Street |
| Miami-Dade | Miami Lakes | 7.569 | 12.181 | SR 860 (Miami Gardens Drive) | Northwest 183rd Street |
| Miami-Dade | Miami Lakes | 8.780 | 14.130 | Honey Hill Drive (CR 854 east) | Northwest 202nd Street; former western terminus of SR 854 |
| Broward | Miramar | 9.604– 9.894 | 15.456– 15.923 | Florida's Turnpike Extension – Homestead, Orlando | Exit 43 on Turnpike Extension |
| Broward | Miramar | 10.260 | 16.512 | Miramar Parkway (CR 858 east) | To SR 858 |
| Broward | Miramar | 11.697 | 18.824 | SR 823 north (Flamingo Road) | Northern terminus of Red Road |
1.000 mi = 1.609 km; 1.000 km = 0.621 mi: Electronic toll collection; Route transition
