= Country Walk, Florida =

- Census-designated place
- Location in Miami-Dade County and the state of Florida

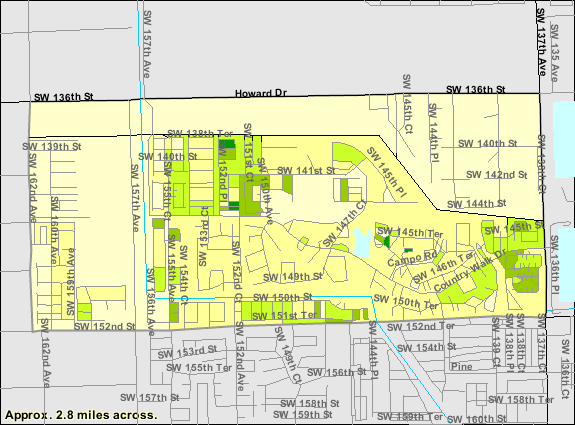
- U.S. Census Bureau map showing CDP boundaries
- Coordinates: 25°37′59″N 80°26′07″W
- Country: United States
- State: Florida
- County: Miami-Dade

Area
  - Total: 2.62 sq mi (6.78 km^{2})
  - Land: 2.58 sq mi (6.68 km^{2})
  - Water: 0.039 sq mi (0.10 km^{2})
- Elevation: 7 ft (2.1 m)

Population (2020)
  - Total: 16,951
  - Density: 6,572.8/sq mi (2,537.79/km^{2})
- Time zone: UTC-5 (Eastern (EST))
  - Summer (DST): UTC-4 (EDT)
- ZIP Codes: 33186, 33196 (Miami)
- Area codes: 305, 786, 645
- FIPS code: 12-15055
- GNIS feature ID: 2402802

Country Walk is a census-designated place (CDP) in Miami-Dade County, Florida, United States. It is part of the Miami metropolitan area of South Florida. The population was 16,951 at the 2020 census, up from 15,997 at the 2010 census.

== Geography ==
Country Walk is located 19 miles (31 km) southwest of downtown Miami. It is bordered to the east by Three Lakes, to the south by Richmond West, to the west by farmland, and to the north by Miami Executive Airport. The community's borders are Florida State Road 825 (SW 137th Avenue) to the east, State Road 992 (Coral Reef Drive) to the south, SW 162nd Avenue to the west, and SW 136th Street to the north.

According to the United States Census Bureau, the CDP has a total area of 2.6 square miles (6.7 km^{2}), of which 0.04 square miles (0.10 km^{2}), or 1.53%, are water.

== History ==
The Country Walk community was originally designed and built by the Disney-owned Arvida Corporation. Country Walk Arvida broke ground on the first homes in 1978 and construction finished in 1994.

In 1985, Janet Reno prosecuted the Country Walk case, allegedly an example of day-care sex-abuse hysteria. The Arvida Corp. paid settlements of over $5 million to alleged victims in this case.

In August 1992, Country Walk was severely destroyed by Hurricane Andrew. 90% of the 1,700 homes in Country Walk were destroyed. Following the hurricane, property owners filed lawsuits against the developer of Country Walk, Arvida for shoddy construction. In the subsequent years, the homes were slowly rebuilt. Unlike the destroyed homes which were made of wood frame construction, the new homes were rebuilt with concrete walls. Although many areas of Miami were heavily affected by Hurricane Andrew, Country Walk was one of the worst affected and remains a reminder of the hurricane's extensive disaster in the CDP today.

=== Description ===
Country Walk is a 1,280-acre (5 km^{2}) deed-restricted community, located in southwest Miami–Dade County. There are 1,606 homes located within the Country Walk community. Country Walk is bounded on the east by 137th Avenue, on the west by 157th Avenue, on the north by SW 144th Terrace, and on the south by SW 152nd Street. Country Walk is made up of six sub-associations and one master association. The sub-associations are Country Villas, Estate Homes, Lakeside, Patio Homes, Stoneybrook and Village Homes.

Country Walk Master Association has a clubhouse located at 14601 Country Walk Drive. The clubhouse includes a swimming pool, Jacuzzi, tennis courts, basketball courts, volleyball court, playground, and game rooms. The clubhouse is located in the center of Country Walk, and it is used as a gathering place for the residents to join together and have fun. There are various activities planned at the clubhouse throughout the year. It starts in February with our Annual Valentines Day Music Under the Stars and ends in December with the Annual Holiday Party but the best is right in the middle the July 4th Holiday Party including fireworks! There are also regular activities planned at the clubhouse for the residents to participate in such as tennis on Tuesdays, strategic gaming on Sunday, and bingo on Fridays. The lake located next to the clubhouse has a vita course around the banks, and there is a dock to enjoy the views of the fountain and fishing.

The Country Villas sub-association has 97 townhomes. Country Villas is also known as Hickory Lane. The Estate Homes has 435 single-family homes. The Estate Homes includes sections called Turtle Creek, Live Oaks, Robins Run, and Robins Run East. The Lakeside community has 94 single-family homes, originally built by Weitzer Builders. The Patio Homes has 460 single-family homes with large green belts around the community, and it has sections called Greenwich East, Greenwich West, Roosters Ridge, Summer Tree, and Willow Bend. The Patio Homes also have a swimming pool area for their residents use. The Stoneybrook community is another Weitzer community with 172 single-family homes. Stoenybrook has two playground areas for their residents use. The Village Homes is a condominium community with 344 units and a swimming pool. The condominiums are constructed in groups of four units making a larger building.

There are also two commercial areas included in the Country Walk community. They are the Country Square Shopping Center located within Country Walk and the Country Walk Plaza located at the corner of SW 152nd Street and SW 137th Avenue. The Country Square Shopping Center includes many local businesses including restaurants, childcare, a pharmacy, pet store, real estate sales office and a corner store. The Country Walk Plaza includes banks and several grocery and retail stores.

== Demographics ==
Historical population
Census	Pop.	Note	%±
2000	10,653		—
2010	15,997		50.2%
2020	16,951		6.0%

=== Racial and ethnic composition ===
Country Walk CDP, Florida – Racial and ethnic composition Note: the US Census treats Hispanic/Latino as an ethnic category. This table excludes Latinos from the racial categories and assigns them to a separate category. Hispanics/Latinos may be of any race.
Race / Ethnicity (NH = Non-Hispanic)	Pop 2010	Pop 2020	% 2010	% 2020
White (NH)	2,657	1,958	16.61%	11.55%
Black or African American (NH)	1,416	1,122	8.85%	6.62%
Native American or Alaska Native (NH)	3	13	0.02%	0.08%
Asian (NH)	412	437	2.58%	2.58%
Pacific Islander or Native Hawaiian (NH)	8	5	0.05%	0.03%
Some other race (NH)	63	107	0.39%	0.63%
Mixed race or Multiracial (NH)	204	327	1.28%	1.93%
Hispanic or Latino (any race)	11,234	12,982	70.23%	76.59%
Total	15,997	16,951	100.00%	100.00%

=== 2020 census ===
As of the 2020 census, there were 16,951 people in the CDP.

The median age was 41.1 years. 21.6% of residents were under the age of 18 and 13.6% were 65 years of age or older. For every 100 females there were 89.8 males, and for every 100 females age 18 and over there were 86.3 males age 18 and over.

100.0% of residents lived in urban areas, while 0.0% lived in rural areas.

There were 5,190 households in Country Walk, of which 43.0% had children under the age of 18 living in them. Of all households, 62.4% were married-couple households, 9.7% were households with a male householder and no spouse or partner present, and 20.8% were households with a female householder and no spouse or partner present. About 10.0% of all households were made up of individuals and 4.1% had someone living alone who was 65 years of age or older.

There were 5,277 housing units, of which 1.6% were vacant. The homeowner vacancy rate was 0.3% and the rental vacancy rate was 2.5%.

According to the 2020 ACS 5-year estimates, there were 4,090 families residing in the CDP.

=== 2010 census ===
As of the 2010 United States census, there were 15,997 people, 4,602 households, and 3,810 families residing in the CDP.

=== 2000 census ===
As of the census of 2000, there were 10,653 people, 3,234 households, and 2,820 families residing in the CDP. The population density was 3,879.0 inhabitants per square mile (1,497.7/km^{2}). There were 3,409 housing units at an average density of 1,241.3 per square mile (479.3/km^{2}). The racial makeup of the CDP was 77.60% White (28.6% were Non-Hispanic White), 10.66% African American, 0.10% Native American, 2.52% Asian, 0.05% Pacific Islander, 5.00% from other races, and 4.06% from two or more races. Hispanic or Latino of any race were 56.13% of the population.

There were 3,234 households, out of which 56.9% had children under the age of 18 living with them, 71.3% were married couples living together, 12.3% had a female householder with no husband present, and 12.8% were non-families. 9.7% of all households were made up of individuals, and 1.4% had someone living alone who was 65 years of age or older. The average household size was 3.29 and the average family size was 3.51.

In the CDP, the population was spread out, with 32.7% under the age of 18, 6.7% from 18 to 24, 38.5% from 25 to 44, 17.0% from 45 to 64, and 5.0% who were 65 years of age or older. The median age was 32 years. For every 100 females, there were 91.4 males. For every 100 females age 18 and over, there were 86.0 males.

The median income for a household in the CDP was $63,689, and the median income for a family was $66,250. Males had a median income of $41,798 versus $30,987 for females. The per capita income for the CDP was $20,736. About 3.5% of families and 4.8% of the population were below the poverty line, including 3.8% of those under age 18 and 17.6% of those age 65 or over.

As of 2000, Spanish was the first language for 61.78% of all residents, while English accounted for 35.79%, Urdu accounted for 1.02%, Portuguese made up 0.59%, French was 0.48%, and French Creole was the mother tongue for 0.31% of the population.

== Education ==
Miami-Dade County Public Schools serves students in the CDP. Within the Country Walk community is Jack D. Gordon Elementary School, a public elementary school. Nearby are public middle schools Herbert A. Ammons Middle School and Richmond Heights Middle School, as well as nearby public high schools Coral Reef Senior High School, Miami Sunset Senior High School, and Robert Morgan Educational Center (which is a magnet high school).
