= Florida State Road 985 =

State highway in Florida, United States

State Road 985
- West 107th Avenue

Route information
- Maintained by FDOT
- Length: 7.604 mi (12.237 km)

Major junctions
- South end: SR 990 / SR 874 in Kendall
- US 41 in University Park
- North end: SR 836 in Fontainebleau

Location
- Country: United States
- State: Florida
- Counties: Miami-Dade

Highway system
- Florida State Highway System; Interstate; US; State; Former; Pre‑1945; Toll; Scenic
← SR 979	→ SR 986

State Road 985 (SR 985), locally known as West 107th Avenue, FIU Avenue, and Avenue of the Americas, is a 7.604-mile (12.237 km) long north–south street in western Miami-Dade County, Florida, serving the communities of Kendall, University Park, Sweetwater, Fontainebleau, and Doral.

== Route description ==
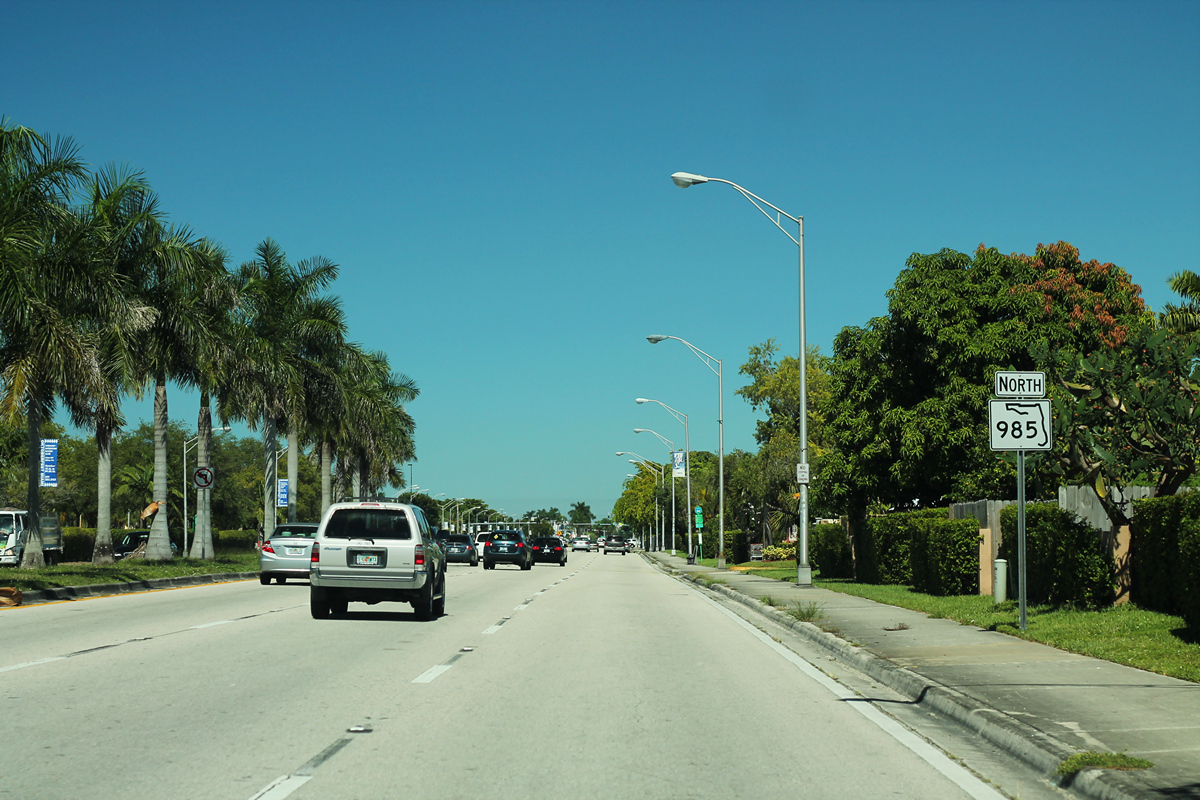
SR 985 northbound near the campus of Florida International University

SR 985 begins at an intersection with SR 990 next to the Killian Parkway interchange of the Don Shula Expressway (SR 874) near the Kendall Campus of Miami-Dade College. It ends at an interchange with the Dolphin Expressway (SR 836) just south of Miami International Mall in Doral. For the entire length of SR 985, Florida's Turnpike (SR 821) runs parallel to it, lying one mile (1.6 km) to the west, with access to it via the Don Shula Expressway, Kendall Drive (SR 94), Bird Road (SR 976), Tamiami Trail (US 41), and the Dolphin Expressway.

It passes through residential neighborhoods with apartment complexes, strip malls, and Miami-Dade County Parks (Tamiami Park at Coral Way, Kendall Indian Hammocks Park between SR 94 and SR 986). It is also a primary access route for two major regional malls on its northern end.

== History ==
Constructed in the 1940s as an access road for the original Tamiami Airport (now the site of Florida International University), SR 985 has become an important commercial highway and an alternative for the increasingly clogged Turnpike for commuters.

== Major intersections ==
The entire route is in Miami-Dade County.

Location	mi	km	Destinations	Notes
Kendall	0.000	0.000	SR 990 east (Killian Parkway) / SR 874	Southwest 104th Street; western terminus of SR 990
Kendall	1.050	1.690	SR 94 (Kendall Drive)	Southwest 88th Street
Kendall	2.022	3.254	SR 986 (Sunset Drive)	Southwest 72nd Street
Westwood Lakes–Westchester line	4.170	6.711	SR 976 (Bird Road) to Florida's Turnpike Extension	Southwest 40th Street
Westchester	5.161	8.306	Coral Way	Southwest 24th Street
Westchester	6.170	9.930	US 41 (Southwest 8th Street)	Tamiami Trail
Sweetwater	6.663	10.723	Flagler Street	Former western terminus of SR 968
Fontainebleau–Doral line	7.50	12.07	SR 836 to Florida's Turnpike Extension – Airport	
Doral	7.604	12.237	Northwest 107th Avenue north	Continues north without designation
1.000 mi = 1.609 km; 1.000 km = 0.621 mi: Electronic toll collection
