= Richmond Heights, Florida =

- Census-designated place
- Location in Miami-Dade County and the state of Florida

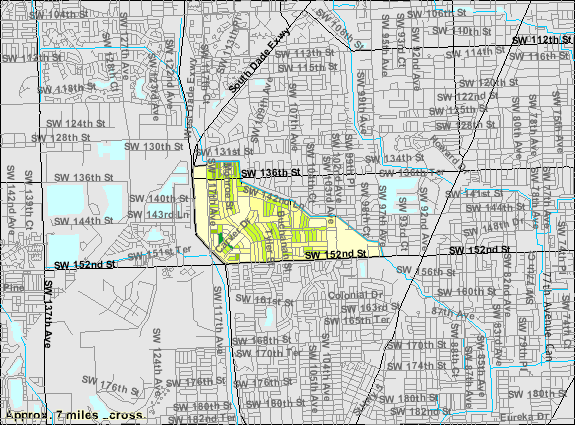
- U.S. Census Bureau map showing CDP boundaries
- Coordinates: 25°38′09″N 80°22′32″W
- Country: United States
- State: Florida
- County: Miami-Dade

Area
  - Total: 1.61 sq mi (4.17 km^{2})
  - Land: 1.59 sq mi (4.13 km^{2})
  - Water: 0.015 sq mi (0.04 km^{2})
- Elevation: 10 ft (3.0 m)

Population (2020)
  - Total: 8,944
  - Density: 5,611.5/sq mi (2,166.62/km^{2})
- Time zone: UTC-5 (Eastern (EST))
  - Summer (DST): UTC-4 (EDT)
- ZIP codes: 33157, 33176, 33186 (Miami)
- Area codes: 305, 786, 645
- FIPS code: 12-60225
- GNIS feature ID: 2403473

Richmond Heights is a census-designated place (CDP) in Miami-Dade County, Florida, United States. It is part of the Miami metropolitan area of South Florida. The population was 8,944 at the 2020 census.

== History ==
At the beginning of World War II, the United States Navy purchased 2,500 acres (1,000 ha) of land in southwestern Dade (now called Miami-Dade) County for the purpose of constructing an airship base. The land was owned by the Richmond Timber Company, a major supplier of Dade County Pine (a denser, harder, sub-species of Pinus palustris, or longleaf pine). The base was named Naval Air Station Richmond, after the lumber company, and was home to the 25 ships of ZP-21 (Patrol, Airship Squadron 21 and Airship Wing 2). NAS Richmond was the second largest airship base in the United States, NAS Lakehurst in New Jersey being the largest. NAS Richmond was destroyed by a hurricane and fire in September 1945.

After the end of World War II, Captain Frank C. Martin, a Pan American pilot, purchased farmland adjacent to the base in rural southwest Dade County. With this purchase he created Richmond Heights, as a new community for returning African American veterans.

Of the original 2,500 acres (1,000 ha) he purchased in 1949, the federal government had used 800 acres (320 ha) to build the headquarters of Naval Air Station Richmond, a blimp base constructed in the early months of World War II Richmond, and was eventually home to 25 K-series blimps, three hangars, and 3,000 men. The hangars were 16 stories tall, built of Douglas fir brought in by train. The blimps protected ship convoys in the Florida Straits, and Richmond was the headquarters for the fight against U-boats operating in the Caribbean.

== Geography ==
Richmond Heights is located 16 miles (26 km) southwest of downtown Miami. It is bordered to the north and east by Kendall, to the south by Palmetto Estates, and to the west by Three Lakes.

According to the United States Census Bureau, the CDP has a total area of 1.6 square miles (4.1 km^{2}), of which 0.02 square miles (0.05 km^{2}), or 0.93%, are water.

== Demographics ==
Historical population
| Census | Pop. | Note | %± |
|---|---|---|---|
| 1960 | 4,311 | | — |
| 1970 | 6,663 | | 54.6% |
| 1980 | 8,577 | | 28.7% |
| 1990 | 8,583 | | 0.1% |
| 2000 | 8,479 | | −1.2% |
| 2010 | 8,541 | | 0.7% |
| 2020 | 8,944 | | 4.7% |
U.S. Decennial Census

=== Racial and ethnic composition ===
Richmond Heights CDP, Florida – Racial and ethnic composition Note: the US Census treats Hispanic/Latino as an ethnic category. This table excludes Latinos from the racial categories and assigns them to a separate category. Hispanics/Latinos may be of any race.
| Race / Ethnicity (NH = Non-Hispanic) | Pop 2000 | Pop 2010 | Pop 2020 | % 2000 | % 2010 | % 2020 |
|---|---|---|---|---|---|---|
| White alone (NH) | 291 | 251 | 314 | 3.43% | 2.94% | 3.51% |
| Black or African American alone (NH) | 6,949 | 5,961 | 4,645 | 81.96% | 69.79% | 51.93% |
| Native American or Alaska Native alone (NH) | 16 | 16 | 11 | 0.19% | 0.19% | 0.12% |
| Asian alone (NH) | 69 | 36 | 45 | 0.81% | 0.42% | 0.50% |
| Native Hawaiian or Pacific Islander alone (NH) | 1 | 1 | 2 | 0.01% | 0.01% | 0.02% |
| Other race alone (NH) | 14 | 23 | 60 | 0.17% | 0.27% | 0.67% |
| Mixed race or Multiracial (NH) | 82 | 117 | 108 | 0.97% | 1.37% | 1.21% |
| Hispanic or Latino (any race) | 1,057 | 2,136 | 3,759 | 12.47% | 25.01% | 42.03% |
| Total | 8,479 | 8,541 | 8,944 | 100.00% | 100.00% | 100.00% |

=== 2020 census ===
As of the 2020 census, Richmond Heights had a population of 8,944. The median age was 43.1 years. 19.2% of residents were under the age of 18, and 20.1% were 65 years of age or older. For every 100 females, there were 86.0 males, and for every 100 females age 18 and over, there were 81.0 males age 18 and over.

100.0% of residents lived in urban areas, while 0.0% lived in rural areas.

There were 2,872 households in Richmond Heights, of which 33.2% had children under the age of 18 living in them. Of all households, 38.2% were married-couple households, 16.0% were households with a male householder and no spouse or partner present, and 38.3% were households with a female householder and no spouse or partner present. About 18.9% of all households were made up of individuals, and 9.9% had someone living alone who was 65 years of age or older.

There were 3,144 housing units, of which 8.7% were vacant. The homeowner vacancy rate was 0.7% and the rental vacancy rate was 17.9%.

The 2020 ACS 5-year estimate reported 2,133 families residing in the CDP.

=== 2010 census ===
As of the 2010 United States census, there were 8,541 people, 2,566 households, and 2,058 families residing in the CDP.

=== 2000 census ===
As of the census of 2000, there were 8,479 people, 2,653 households, and 2,101 families living in the CDP. The population density was 5,124.3 inhabitants per square mile (1,978.5/km^{2}). There were 2,771 housing units at an average density of 1,674.7 per square mile (646.6/km^{2}). The racial makeup of the CDP was 12.45% White (3.4% were Non-Hispanic White), 82.83% African American, 0.22% Native American, 0.83% Asian, 0.01% Pacific Islander, 2.00% from other races, and 1.65% from two or more races. Hispanic or Latino of any race were 12.47% of the population.

As of 2000, there were 2,653 households, out of which 32.5% had children under the age of 18 living with them, 42.4% were married couples living together, 30.1% had a female householder with no husband present, and 20.8% were non-families. 17.9% of all households were made up of individuals, and 8.3% had someone living alone who was 65 years of age or older. The average household size was 3.16 and the average family size was 3.55.

In 2000, the CDP, the population was spread out, with 29.0% under the age of 18, 9.0% from 18 to 24, 26.3% from 25 to 44, 21.8% from 45 to 64, and 14.0% who were 65 years of age or older. The median age was 35 years. For every 100 females, there were 83.8 males. For every 100 females age 18 and over, there were 77.9 males.

In 2000, the median income for a household in the CDP was $38,191, and the median income for a family was $44,095. Males had a median income of $31,286 versus $27,882 for females. The per capita income for the CDP was $15,824. About 14.0% of families and 15.1% of the population were below the poverty line, including 23.0% of those under age 18 and 14.8% of those age 65 or over.

As of 2000, speakers of English as a first language accounted for 87.29% of residents, while Spanish as a mother tongue made up 12.70% of the population.

== Attractions ==
Annually, people travel back to Miami-Dade County to celebrate the Historic Weekend hosted by the Historic Society.

The Richmond Heights 49ers was funded in part by a grant from the Florida Humanities Council, National Endowment of the Arts, Miami-Dade County Cultural Arts Department, and the Greater Miami Convention & Visitors Bureau.
