= Tamiami, Florida =

- Census-designated place
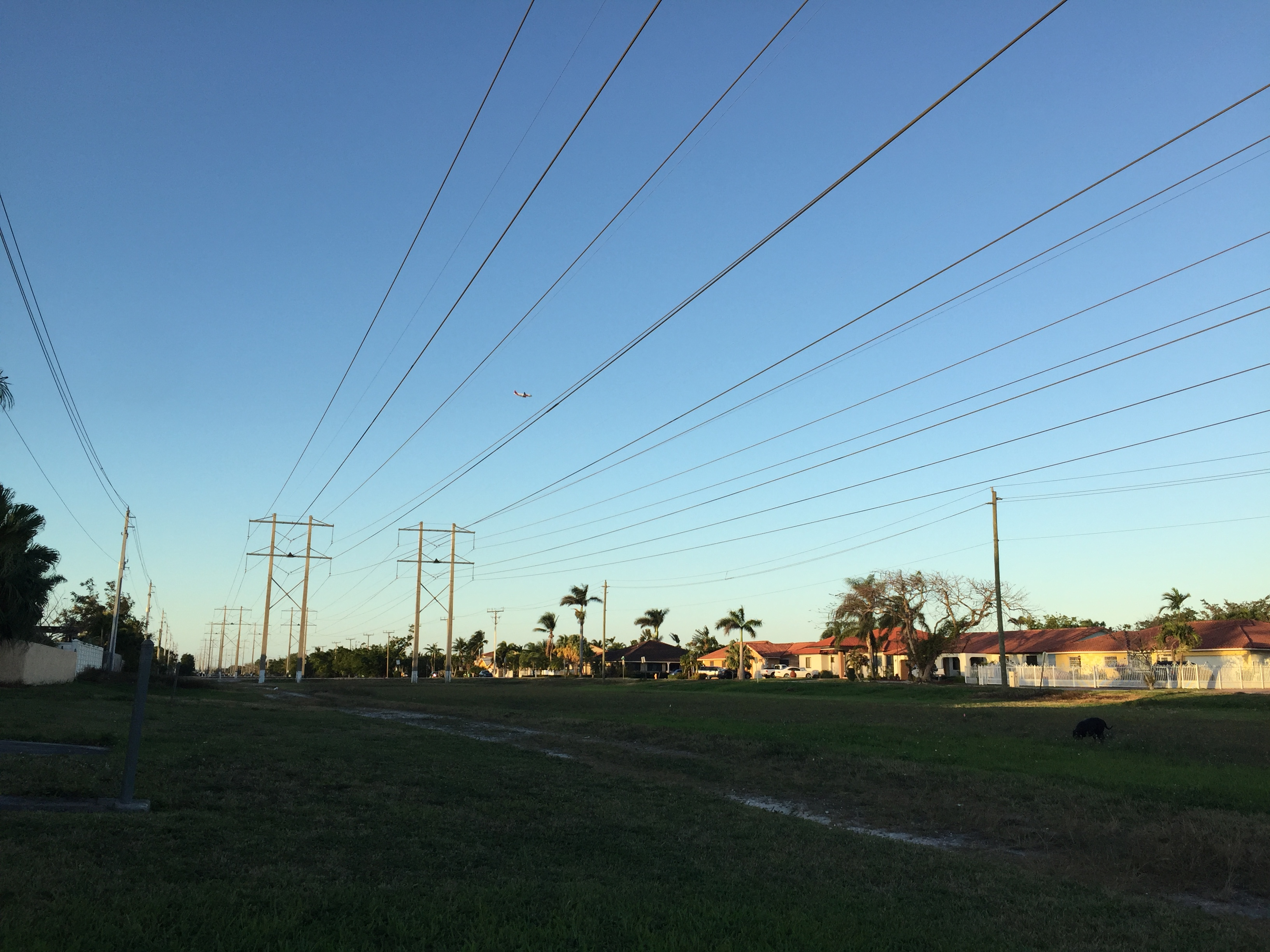
- Tamiami suburb

- Location in Miami-Dade County and the state of Florida

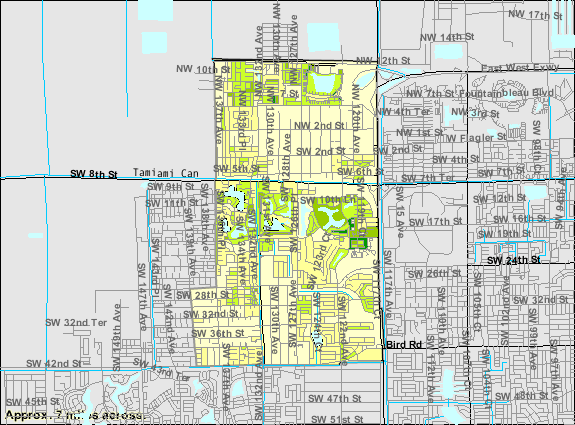
- U.S. Census Bureau map showing CDP boundaries
- Coordinates: 25°44′42″N 80°24′06″W
- Country: United States
- State: Florida
- County: Miami-Dade

Area
  - Total: 7.43 sq mi (19.24 km^{2})
  - Land: 7.05 sq mi (18.25 km^{2})
  - Water: 0.38 sq mi (0.98 km^{2})
- Elevation: 7 ft (2.1 m)

Population (2020)
  - Total: 54,212
  - Density: 7,692.7/sq mi (2,970.18/km^{2})
- Time zone: UTC-5 (Eastern (EST))
  - Summer (DST): UTC-4 (EDT)
- ZIP Codes: 33175, 33182, 33184 (Miami)
- Area codes: 305, 786, 645
- FIPS code: 12-70700
- GNIS feature ID: 2402913

Tamiami is a census-designated place (CDP) in Miami-Dade County, Florida, United States. It is part of the Miami metropolitan area of South Florida. The population was 54,212 at the 2020 census.

== Name ==
The name Tamiami is a portmanteau of the phrase "Tampa to Miami". The Tamiami Trail, a roadway that goes through the Everglades, connecting the two cities, was the reason for this combination. The CDP is pronounced the same way its namesake is (the Tamiami Trail), which is "tammy-ammy" (/ˈtæmiˌæmi/), not "tam-my-ammy" (/ˈtæmˌmaɪˈæmi/).

== Geography ==
Tamiami is located 14 miles (23 km) west of downtown Miami. It is bordered to the east by Sweetwater and Westchester, to the southeast by Westwood Lakes, and to the south by Kendale Lakes. U.S. Route 41, the Tamiami Trail, passes through the center of the community, leading east into Miami and west through the Everglades 95 miles (153 km) to Naples. Tampa is an additional 160 miles (260 km) north beyond Naples. According to the United States Census Bureau, the Tamiami CDP has a total area of 7.4 sq mi (19 km^{2}), of which 0.4 sq mi (1.0 km^{2}), or 5.16%, are water.

== Demographics ==
Historical population
| Census | Pop. | Note | %± |
|---|---|---|---|
| 1980 | 17,607 | | — |
| 1990 | 33,845 | | 92.2% |
| 2000 | 54,788 | | 61.9% |
| 2010 | 55,271 | | 0.9% |
| 2020 | 54,212 | | −1.9% |

=== Racial and ethnic composition ===
Tamiami CDP, Florida – Racial and ethnic composition Note: the US Census treats Hispanic/Latino as an ethnic category. This table excludes Latinos from the racial categories and assigns them to a separate category. Hispanics/Latinos may be of any race.
| Race / Ethnicity (NH = Non-Hispanic) | Pop 2010 | Pop 2020 | % 2010 | % 2020 |
|---|---|---|---|---|
| White (NH) | 3,418 | 3,210 | 6.18% | 5.92% |
| Black or African American (NH) | 162 | 191 | 0.29% | 0.35% |
| Native American or Alaska Native (NH) | 16 | 8 | 0.03% | 0.01% |
| Asian (NH) | 328 | 325 | 0.59% | 0.60% |
| Pacific Islander or Native Hawaiian (NH) | 0 | 6 | 0.00% | 0.01% |
| Some other race (NH) | 35 | 146 | 0.06% | 0.27% |
| Mixed race or Multiracial (NH) | 95 | 247 | 0.17% | 0.46% |
| Hispanic or Latino (any race) | 51,217 | 50,079 | 92.67% | 92.38% |
| Total | 55,271 | 54,212 | 100.00% | 100.00% |

=== 2020 census ===
As of the 2020 census, Tamiami had a population of 54,212. The median age was 47.0 years. 16.2% of residents were under the age of 18 and 22.0% of residents were 65 years of age or older. For every 100 females there were 89.0 males, and for every 100 females age 18 and over there were 86.0 males age 18 and over.

100.0% of residents lived in urban areas, while 0.0% lived in rural areas.

There were 17,234 households in Tamiami, of which 32.1% had children under the age of 18 living in them. Of all households, 51.8% were married-couple households, 12.0% were households with a male householder and no spouse or partner present, and 27.6% were households with a female householder and no spouse or partner present. About 13.8% of all households were made up of individuals and 7.7% had someone living alone who was 65 years of age or older.

There were 17,620 housing units, of which 2.2% were vacant. The homeowner vacancy rate was 0.5% and the rental vacancy rate was 3.2%.

Racial composition as of the 2020 census
| Race | Number | Percent |
|---|---|---|
| White | 14,743 | 27.2% |
| Black or African American | 379 | 0.7% |
| American Indian and Alaska Native | 58 | 0.1% |
| Asian | 391 | 0.7% |
| Native Hawaiian and Other Pacific Islander | 11 | 0.0% |
| Some other race | 5,695 | 10.5% |
| Two or more races | 32,935 | 60.8% |
| Hispanic or Latino (of any race) | 50,079 | 92.4% |

=== 2010 census ===
As of the 2010 United States census, there were 55,271 people, 16,288 households, and 14,100 families residing in the CDP.

=== 2000 census ===
As of the census of 2000, there were 54,788 people, 16,285 households, and 14,233 families residing in the CDP. The population density was 7,461.3 people per square mile (2,882.0/km^{2}). There were 16,707 housing units at an average density of 2,275.3/sq mi (878.8/km^{2}). The racial makeup of the CDP was 90.57% White (11.8% were Non-Hispanic White), 0.89% African American, 0.10% Native American, 0.59% Asian, 0.02% Pacific Islander, 4.85% from other races, and 2.99% from two or more races. Hispanic or Latino of any race were 86.98% of the population.

As of 2000, there were 16,285 households out of which 42.1% had children under the age of 18 living with them, 66.0% were married couples living together, 16.2% had a female householder with no husband present, and 12.6% were non-families. 9.4% of all households were made up of individuals and 3.5% had someone living alone who was 65 years of age or older. The average household size was 3.33 and the average family size was 3.50.

In 2000, in the CDP the population was spread out with 24.4% under the age of 18, 8.7% from 18 to 24, 30.0% from 25 to 44, 24.1% from 45 to 64, and 12.9% who were 65 years of age or older. The median age was 37 years. For every 100 females there were 90.4 males. For every 100 females age 18 and over, there were 85.4 males.

As of 2000, the median income for a household in the CDP was $47,503, and the median income for a family was $49,763. Males had a median income of $30,716 versus $26,426 for females. The per capita income for the CDP was $17,601. About 7.6% of families and 9.4% of the population were below the poverty line, including 12.0% of those under age 18 and 9.7% of those age 65 or over.

As of 2000, speakers of Spanish as a first language accounted for 92.39% of residents, while English was the mother tongue of 6.99% of the population.

== Education ==
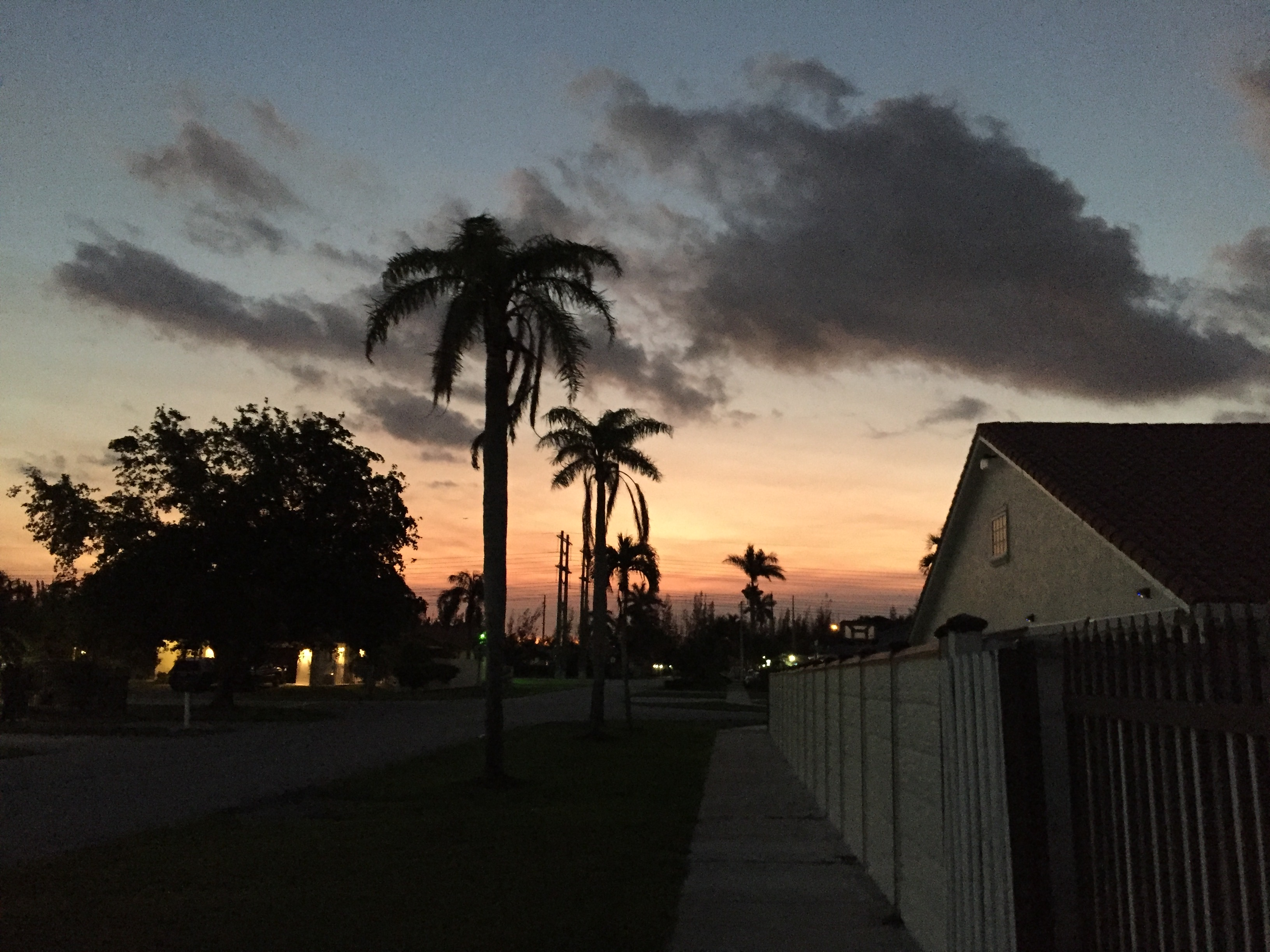
Tamiami at sunset

Miami-Dade County Public Schools operates public schools.

Elementary schools:

- Marjory Stoneman Douglas Elementary School
- Greenglade Elementary School
- Joe Hall Elementary School
- Zora Neale Hurston Elementary School
- Wesley Matthews Elementary School
- Village Green Elementary School

Middle schools:

- Paul W. Bell Middle School
- W. R. Thomas Middle School

Private schools:

The Roman Catholic Archdiocese of Miami operates Catholic schools.

- St. Kevin School is in Tamiami. It opened in August 1980.
- Belen Jesuit Preparatory School is also in Tamiami.
