= Three Lakes, Florida =

- Census-designated place
- Location in Miami-Dade County and the state of Florida

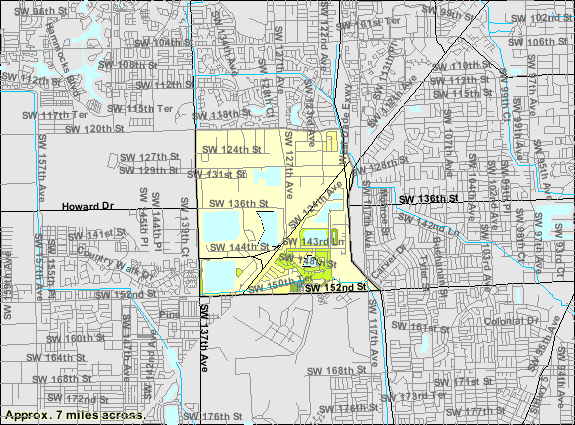
- U.S. Census Bureau map showing CDP boundaries
- Coordinates: 25°38′30″N 80°24′00″W
- Country: United States
- State: Florida
- County: Miami-Dade

Area
  - Total: 3.90 sq mi (10.09 km^{2})
  - Land: 3.23 sq mi (8.36 km^{2})
  - Water: 0.67 sq mi (1.73 km^{2})
- Elevation: 7 ft (2.1 m)

Population (2020)
  - Total: 16,540
  - Density: 5,126.0/sq mi (1,979.16/km^{2})
- Time zone: UTC-5 (Eastern (EST))
  - Summer (DST): UTC-4 (EDT)
- ZIP Code: 33186 (Miami)
- Area codes: 305, 786, 645
- FIPS code: 12-71741
- GNIS feature ID: 2402928

Three Lakes is a census-designated place (CDP) and planned community in Miami-Dade County, Florida, United States. It is part of the Miami metropolitan area of South Florida. The population was 16,540 at the 2020 census, up from 15,047 in 2010.

== Geography ==
Three Lakes is located 16 miles (26 km) southwest of downtown Miami. It is bordered to the north by The Crossings, to the northeast by Kendall, to the east by Richmond Heights, to the south by Zoo Miami, and to the west by Country Walk. The Hammocks touches the northwest corner of Three Lakes, and Palmetto Estates touches the southeast corner.

According to the United States Census Bureau, the Three Lakes CDP has a total area of 3.9 square miles (10 km^{2}), of which 3.2 square miles (8.3 km^{2}) are land and 0.7 square miles (1.8 km^{2}), or 17.17%, are water.

=== Neighborhoods ===
The three main neighborhoods in the Three Lakes CDP are Deerwood, Bonita Lakes, and Three Lakes (its namesake).

== Demographics ==
Historical population
Census	Pop.	Note	%±
2000	6,955		—
2010	15,047		116.3%
2020	16,540		9.9%
U.S. Decennial Census

=== Racial and ethnic composition ===
Three Lakes CDP, Florida – Racial and ethnic composition Note: the US Census treats Hispanic/Latino as an ethnic category. This table excludes Latinos from the racial categories and assigns them to a separate category. Hispanics/Latinos may be of any race.
Race / Ethnicity (NH = Non-Hispanic)	Pop 2010	Pop 2020	% 2010	% 2020
White (NH)	2,805	2,192	18.64%	13.25%
Black or African American (NH)	1,388	1,050	9.22%	6.35%
Native American or Alaska Native (NH)	8	13	0.05%	0.08%
Asian (NH)	667	717	4.43%	4.33%
Pacific Islander or Native Hawaiian (NH)	7	4	0.05%	0.02%
Some other race (NH)	80	131	0.53%	0.79%
Mixed race or Multiracial (NH)	249	466	1.65%	2.82%
Hispanic or Latino (any race)	9,843	11,967	65.42%	72.35%
Total	15,047	16,540	100.00%	100.00%

=== 2020 census ===
As of the 2020 census, Three Lakes had a population of 16,540. The median age was 38.2 years. 22.5% of residents were under the age of 18 and 11.5% of residents were 65 years of age or older. For every 100 females, there were 89.2 males, and for every 100 females age 18 and over, there were 85.3 males age 18 and over.

100.0% of residents lived in urban areas, while 0.0% lived in rural areas.

There were 5,475 households in Three Lakes, of which 42.0% had children under the age of 18 living in them. Of all households, 54.0% were married-couple households, 12.0% were households with a male householder and no spouse or partner present, and 26.0% were households with a female householder and no spouse or partner present. About 15.2% of all households were made up of individuals and 5.0% had someone living alone who was 65 years of age or older.

There were 5,735 housing units, of which 4.5% were vacant. The homeowner vacancy rate was 0.9% and the rental vacancy rate was 6.8%.

=== Demographic estimates ===
The Census Bureau's 2020 ACS 5-year estimates reported 3,813 families residing in the CDP.

=== 2010 census ===
As of the 2010 United States census, there were 15,047 people, 4,726 households, and 3,606 families residing in the CDP.

=== 2000 census ===
As of the census of 2000, there were 6,955 people, 2,463 households, and 1,889 families residing in the CDP. The population density was 2,131.4 inhabitants per square mile (822.9/km^{2}). There were 2,627 housing units at an average density of 805.1 per square mile (310.9/km^{2}). The racial makeup of the CDP was 72.49% White (31.6% were Non-Hispanic White), 15.64% African American, 0.12% Native American, 3.87% Asian, 0.01% Pacific Islander, 4.10% from other races, and 3.77% from two or more races. Hispanic or Latino of any race were 47.76% of the population.

As of 2000, there were 2,463 households, out of which 44.8% had children under the age of 18 living with them, 56.4% were married couples living together, 15.8% had a female householder with no husband present, and 23.3% were non-families. 16.9% of all households were made up of individuals, and 2.1% had someone living alone who was 65 years of age or older. The average household size was 2.82 and the average family size was 3.19.

In 2000, in the CDP, the population was spread out, with 28.3% under the age of 18, 9.4% from 18 to 24, 40.8% from 25 to 44, 16.1% from 45 to 64, and 5.4% who were 65 years of age or older. The median age was 31 years. For every 100 females, there were 90.4 males. For every 100 females age 18 and over, there were 85.5 males.

In 2000, the median income for a household in the CDP was $54,830, and the median income for a family was $58,424. Males had a median income of $37,194 versus $30,481 for females. The per capita income for the CDP was $22,832. About 6.7% of families and 8.0% of the population were below the poverty line, including 8.0% of those under age 18 and 13.8% of those age 65 or over.

As of 2000, speakers of Spanish as a first language accounted for 51.87% of residents, while English made up 45.19%, and French was the mother tongue of 2.92% of the population.
