= Kendale Lakes, Florida =

- Census-designated place
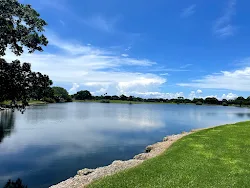
- A lake at the Miccosukee Golf & Country Club

- Location in Miami-Dade County and the state of Florida

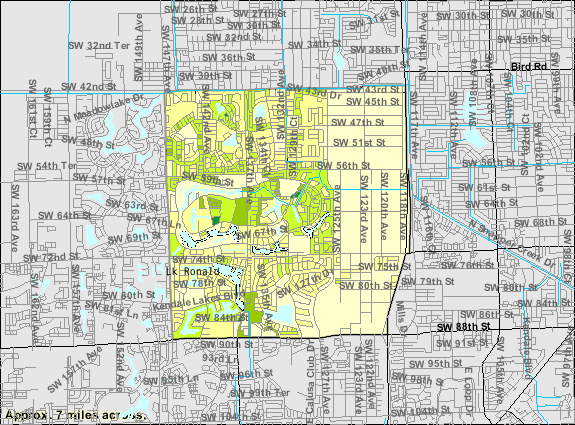
- U.S. Census Bureau map of Kendale Lakes showing boundaries
- Coordinates: 25°42′29″N 80°24′28″W
- Country: United States
- State: Florida
- County: Miami-Dade

Area
  - Total: 8.61 sq mi (22.29 km^{2})
  - Land: 8.07 sq mi (20.91 km^{2})
  - Water: 0.53 sq mi (1.38 km^{2})
- Elevation: 7 ft (2.1 m)

Population (2020)
  - Total: 55,646
  - Density: 6,891.2/sq mi (2,660.72/km^{2})
- Time zone: UTC-5 (Eastern (EST))
  - Summer (DST): UTC-4 (EDT)
- ZIP Codes: 33175, 33183 (Miami)
- Area codes: 305, 786, 645
- FIPS code: 12-36062
- GNIS feature ID: 2403167

Kendale Lakes is a census-designated place (CDP) and a suburb of Miami in Miami-Dade County, Florida, United States. It is located in the Miami metropolitan area of South Florida. The population was 55,646 at the 2020 census.

== History ==
Kendale Lakes (and all of West Kendall) once had a large Miami Jewish population; many prominent attorneys lived there throughout the mid and late 70s. It was truly a bedroom community up until the mid to late 80s.

El Dorado Blvd was once a walk-through outdoor mall with many mom and pop stores called the Kendale Lakes Mall. It was a destination for locals and had many specialty shops like Second Skin, Smatt Bootery, Sentry Drugs, Mightiest Mortals and restaurants like Fiesta Tacos, The Carvery, Cozzoli's Pizza, Tiger Tea House and Burns Bakery to name but a few. Kendale Lakes Mall remains a source of nostalgia for many locals who grew up in the area during the late 1970s and 1980s.

The Kendale Lakes Country Club was bought by the Miccosukee tribe. It originally was an amenity offered to local homeowners. It is still surrounded by tree lined streets - a canopy of trees and lush green lawns. Coral rocks cover a moat which is located around its circumference, and it is dotted with lakes. At one time there was a small sandy beach and picnic area and pier which is now closed. There are remnants of the old pier. There were two pools at the country club (one for family and one for adults only) including an Olympic size pool, replaced now by a volleyball court.

As of October 20, 2024, the last Kmart-branded store in the contiguous United States is located in Kendale Lakes. Unlike most locations bearing the Kmart brand name, the Kendale Lakes location is a convenience store, rather than a big-box department store. However, it is not the last remaining location globally, with one standard big-box store found in Guam and the U.S. Virgin Islands each.

== Geography ==
Kendale Lakes is located 15 miles (24 km) west-southwest of downtown Miami. It is bordered to the north by Tamiami, to the northeast by Westwood Lakes, to the southeast by Kendall, to the south by The Crossings, to the southwest by The Hammocks, and to the west by Kendall West.

The Homestead Extension of Florida's Turnpike forms the eastern edge of Kendale Lakes, with access from Exits 20 and 23. The highway leads north and east 24 miles (39 km) to Florida's Turnpike between Miramar and Miami Gardens, and south 22 miles (35 km) to its end at U.S. Route 1 in Florida City.

According to the United States Census Bureau, the Kendale Lakes CDP has a total area of 8.6 square miles (22 km^{2}), of which 8.1 square miles (21 km^{2}) are land and 0.5 square miles (1.3 km^{2}), or 6.19%, are water.

== Demographics ==
Historical population
Census	Pop.	Note	%±
1980	32,789		—
1990	48,524		48.0%
2000	56,901		17.3%
2010	56,148		−1.3%
2020	55,646		−0.9%

=== Racial and ethnic composition ===
Kendale Lakes CDP, Florida – Racial and ethnic composition Note: the US Census treats Hispanic/Latino as an ethnic category. This table excludes Latinos from the racial categories and assigns them to a separate category. Hispanics/Latinos may be of any race.
Race / Ethnicity (NH = Non-Hispanic)	Pop 2010	Pop 2020	% 2010	% 2020
White (NH)	5,937	4,363	10.57%	7.84%
Black or African American (NH)	631	537	1.12%	0.97%
Native American or Alaska Native (NH)	14	7	0.02%	0.01%
Asian (NH)	721	633	1.28%	1.14%
Pacific Islander or Native Hawaiian (NH)	1	6	0.00%	0.01%
Some other race (NH)	50	171	0.09%	0.31%
Mixed race or Multiracial (NH)	210	407	0.37%	0.73%
Hispanic or Latino (any race)	48,584	49,522	86.53%	88.99%
Total	56,148	55,646	100.00%	100.00%

=== 2020 census ===
As of the 2020 census, Kendale Lakes had a population of 55,646. The median age was 45.7 years. 17.1% of residents were under the age of 18 and 20.6% of residents were 65 years of age or older. For every 100 females there were 87.3 males, and for every 100 females age 18 and over there were 84.2 males age 18 and over.

100.0% of residents lived in urban areas, while 0.0% lived in rural areas.

There were 18,929 households in Kendale Lakes, of which 32.5% had children under the age of 18 living in them. Of all households, 49.8% were married-couple households, 11.9% were households with a male householder and no spouse or partner present, and 29.8% were households with a female householder and no spouse or partner present. About 15.6% of all households were made up of individuals and 8.8% had someone living alone who was 65 years of age or older.

There were 19,479 housing units, of which 2.8% were vacant. The homeowner vacancy rate was 0.6% and the rental vacancy rate was 3.7%.

Racial composition as of the 2020 census
Race	Number	Percent
White	15,640	28.1%
Black or African American	720	1.3%
American Indian and Alaska Native	88	0.2%
Asian	688	1.2%
Native Hawaiian and Other Pacific Islander	7	0.0%
Some other race	6,477	11.6%
Two or more races	32,026	57.6%
Hispanic or Latino (of any race)	49,522	89.0%

=== 2010 census ===
As of the 2010 United States census, there were 56,148 people, 17,984 households, and 14,240 families residing in the CDP.

=== 2000 census ===
As of 2000, 42.1% had children under the age of 18 living with them, 60.6% were married couples living together, 17.3% had a female householder with no husband present, and 17.1% were non-families. 13.3% of all households were made up of individuals, and 4.8% had someone living alone who was 65 years of age or older. The average household size was 3.13 and the average family size was 3.40.

In 2000, the CDP the population was spread out, with 25.6% under the age of 18, 9.2% from 18 to 24, 31.0% from 25 to 44, 23.0% from 45 to 64, and 11.3% who were 65 years of age or older. The median age was 36 years. For every 100 females, there were 89.6 males. For every 100 females age 18 and over, there were 84.2 males.

In 2000, the median income for a household in the CDP was $44,156, and the median income for a family was $46,001. Males had a median income of $30,754 versus $26,134 for females. The per capita income for the CDP was $17,592. About 8.7% of families and 10.3% of the population were below the poverty line, including 12.8% of those under age 18 and 10.5% of those age 65 or over.

As of 2000, speakers of Spanish as a first language accounted for 82.44% of residents, while English made up 15.15% and French Creole was 0.84% of the population.

== Education ==
=== Public schools ===
Miami-Dade County Public Schools operates school district-based public schools.

Elementary schools:

- Bent Tree Elementary School
- Kendale Lakes Elementary School - Kendale Lakes Elementary is located on SW 80th Street and SW 142nd Avenue in the Kendale Lakes Park, just south of the Kendale Lakes Golf Course. The students are known as the Kendale Lakes Tigers, although previously, they were the Sailboats.
- Royal Green Elementary School

K-8 schools:

- Ethel Koger Beckham K-8 Center
- Winston Park K-8 Center

Secondary schools:

- Howard D. McMillan Middle School
- Miami Sunset High School

Charter schools (not operated by MDCPS):

- Archimedean Schools (K-12), including Archimedean Upper Conservatory
- Somerset Palms Academy (K-8)
- Academir Preparatory Academy (elementary)

=== Private schools ===
Private schools:

- Calusa Preparatory School (K-12)
- The Roman Catholic Archdiocese of Miami operates Catholic schools. Good Shepherd School (K-8) is in Kendale Lakes.

Holy Cross Academy was formerly in Kendale Lakes CDP. It closed in 2004.
