= The Crossings, Florida =

- CDP
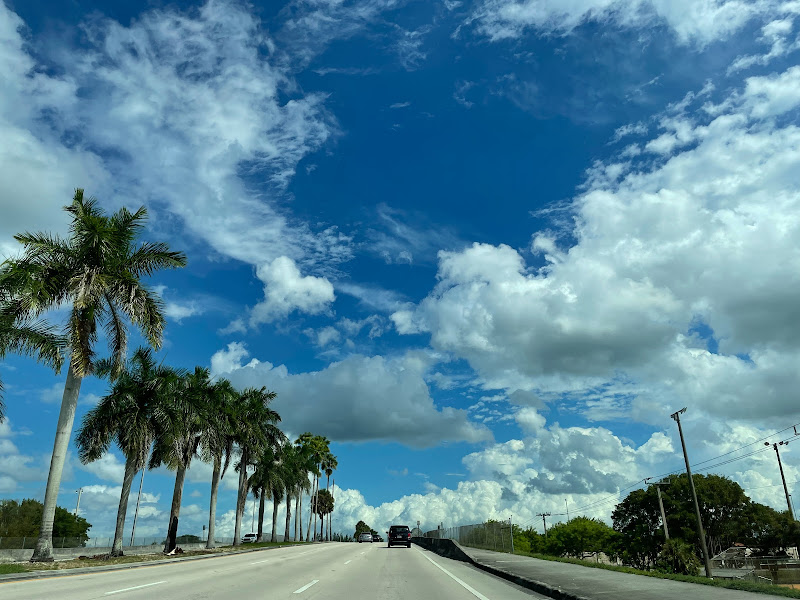
- View from Killian Parkway

- Location in Miami-Dade County and the state of Florida

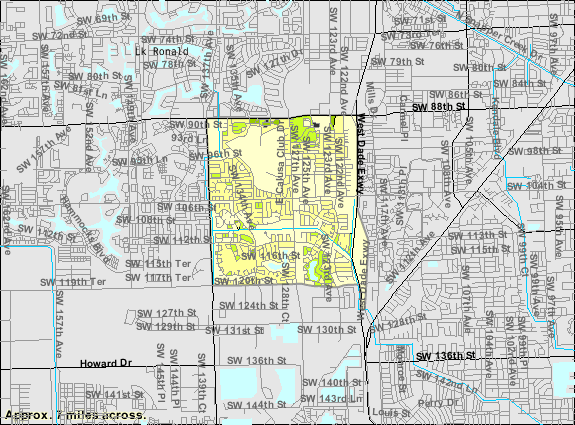
- U.S. Census Bureau map showing CDP boundaries
- Coordinates: 25°40′15″N 80°24′07″W
- Country: United States
- State: Florida
- County: Miami-Dade

Area
  - Total: 3.56 sq mi (9.23 km^{2})
  - Land: 3.44 sq mi (8.90 km^{2})
  - Water: 0.13 sq mi (0.33 km^{2})
- Elevation: 7 ft (2.1 m)

Population (2020)
  - Total: 23,276
  - Density: 6,770.6/sq mi (2,614.15/km^{2})
- Time zone: UTC-5 (Eastern (EST))
  - Summer (DST): UTC-4 (EDT)
- ZIP Code: 33186 (Miami)
- Area codes: 305, 786, 645
- FIPS code: 12-71567
- GNIS feature ID: 2402922

The Crossings is a census-designated place (CDP) and suburb of Miami in Miami-Dade County, Florida, United States. It is part of the Miami metropolitan area of South Florida. The CDP includes the neighborhoods of The Crossings, Devon Aire, and Calusa. The population was 23,276 at the 2020 census.

== Geography ==
The Crossings is located 16 miles (26 km) southwest of downtown Miami. The CDP is bordered on the north by Kendall Drive (SW 88th Street), on the south by SW 120th Street, by Florida's Turnpike on the east, and SW 137th Avenue on the west. Neighboring census-designated places are Kendale Lakes to the north, Kendall to the east, Three Lakes to the south, and The Hammocks to the west.

According to the United States Census Bureau, The Crossings CDP has a total area of 3.6 square miles (9.3 km^{2}), of which 0.1 square miles (0.3 km^{2}), or 3.56%, are water.

== History ==
The communities comprising the CDP were developed in the 1970s and 1980s. The area today is made up of single-family residences and townhouses.

== Demographics ==
Historical population
| Census | Pop. | Note | %± |
|---|---|---|---|
| 1980 | 11,986 | | — |
| 1990 | 22,290 | | 86.0% |
| 2000 | 23,557 | | 5.7% |
| 2010 | 22,758 | | −3.4% |
| 2020 | 23,276 | | 2.3% |

=== Racial and ethnic composition ===
The Crossings CDP, Florida – Racial and ethnic composition Note: the US Census treats Hispanic/Latino as an ethnic category. This table excludes Latinos from the racial categories and assigns them to a separate category. Hispanics/Latinos may be of any race.
| Race / Ethnicity (NH = Non-Hispanic) | Pop 2010 | Pop 2020 | % 2010 | % 2020 |
|---|---|---|---|---|
| White (NH) | 5,100 | 3,597 | 22.41% | 15.45% |
| Black or African American (NH) | 918 | 727 | 4.03% | 3.12% |
| Native American or Alaska Native (NH) | 10 | 12 | 0.04% | 0.05% |
| Asian (NH) | 559 | 542 | 2.46% | 2.33% |
| Pacific Islander or Native Hawaiian (NH) | 1 | 3 | 0.01% | 0.00% |
| Some other race (NH) | 78 | 152 | 0.34% | 0.65% |
| Mixed race or Multiracial (NH) | 289 | 493 | 1.27% | 2.12% |
| Hispanic or Latino (any race) | 15,803 | 17,750 | 69.44% | 76.26% |
| Total | 22,758 | 23,276 | 100.00% | 100.00% |

=== 2020 census ===
As of the 2020 census, The Crossings had a population of 23,276. The median age was 45.0 years. 17.7% of residents were under the age of 18 and 21.2% of residents were 65 years of age or older. For every 100 females there were 85.0 males, and for every 100 females age 18 and over there were 81.2 males age 18 and over.

100.0% of residents lived in urban areas, while 0.0% lived in rural areas.

There were 8,614 households in The Crossings, of which 30.5% had children under the age of 18 living in them. Of all households, 51.5% were married-couple households, 11.9% were households with a male householder and no spouse or partner present, and 30.3% were households with a female householder and no spouse or partner present. About 20.9% of all households were made up of individuals and 10.7% had someone living alone who was 65 years of age or older. There were 5,946 families in the CDP.

There were 8,917 housing units, of which 3.4% were vacant. The homeowner vacancy rate was 0.7% and the rental vacancy rate was 5.1%.

Racial composition as of the 2020 census
| Race | Number | Percent |
|---|---|---|
| White | 7,832 | 33.6% |
| Black or African American | 805 | 3.5% |
| American Indian and Alaska Native | 47 | 0.2% |
| Asian | 568 | 2.4% |
| Native Hawaiian and Other Pacific Islander | 5 | 0.0% |
| Some other race | 2,180 | 9.4% |
| Two or more races | 11,839 | 50.9% |
| Hispanic or Latino (of any race) | 17,750 | 76.3% |

=== 2010 census ===
As of the 2010 United States census, there were 22,758 people, 7,961 households, and 5,972 families residing in the CDP.

=== 2000 census ===
As of the census of 2000, there were 23,557 people, 8,264 households, and 6,255 families residing in the CDP. The population density was 6,304.9 people per square mile (2,431.9/km^{2}). There were 8,672 housing units at an average density of 2,321.0/sq mi (895.3/km^{2}). The racial makeup of the CDP was 85.20% White (34% were Non-Hispanic White), 4.64% African American, 0.09% Native American, 3.31% Asian, 0.05% Pacific Islander, 3.17% from other races, and 3.54% from two or more races. Hispanic or Latino of any race were 56.11% of the population.

As of 2000, there were 8,264 households out of which 40.7% had children under the age of 18 living with them, 56.1% were married couples living together, 15.8% had a female householder with no husband present, and 24.3% were non-families. 19.3% of all households were made up of individuals and 4.0% had someone living alone who was 65 years of age or older. The average household size was 2.85 and the average family size was 3.28.

In 2000, in the CDP the population was spread out with 25.9% under the age of 18, 9.1% from 18 to 24, 32.0% from 25 to 44, 24.6% from 45 to 64, and 8.4% who were 65 years of age or older. The median age was 36 years. For every 100 females there were 87.9 males. For every 100 females age 18 and over, there were 82.3 males.

In 2000, the median income for a household in the CDP was $55,517, and the median income for a family was $60,263. Males had a median income of $42,360 versus $32,543 for females. The per capita income for the CDP was $23,762. About 5.1% of families and 6.5% of the population were below the poverty line, including 5.4% of those under age 18 and 5.3% of those age 65 or over.

As of 2000, speakers of Spanish as a first language accounted for 63.51% of residents, while English made up 31.38%, Portuguese was at 1.65%, French was at 0.91%, Persian at 0.72%, French Creole was the mother tongue of 0.71% of the population.

== Education ==
Miami-Dade County Public Schools operates public schools.

- Calusa Elementary School
- Devon Aire K-8 Center
- Arvida Middle School
- Miami Killian Senior High
