= The Hammocks, Florida =

The Hammocks
- Census-designated place
- Location in Miami-Dade County and the state of Florida

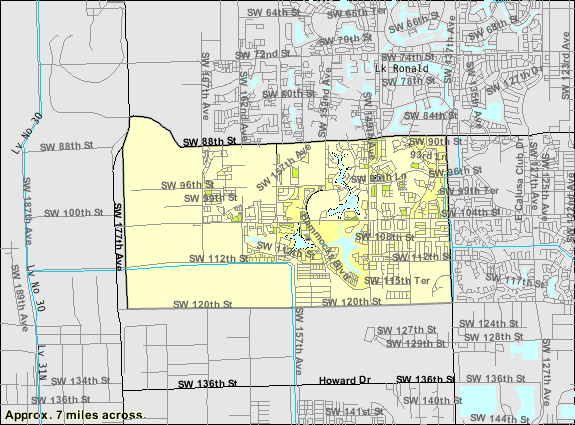
- U.S. Census Bureau map showing CDP boundaries
- Coordinates: 25°40′12″N 80°26′54″W
- Country: United States
- State: Florida
- County: Miami-Dade

Area
  - Total: 8.10 sq mi (20.98 km^{2})
  - Land: 7.89 sq mi (20.43 km^{2})
  - Water: 0.21 sq mi (0.55 km^{2})
- Elevation: 7 ft (2.1 m)

Population (2020)
  - Total: 59,480
  - Density: 7,540.57/sq mi (2,911.43/km^{2})
- Time zone: UTC-5 (EST)
  - Summer (DST): UTC-4 (EDT)
- ZIP codes: 33186, 33196 (Miami)
- Area codes: 305, 786, 645
- FIPS code: 12-71569
- GNIS feature ID: 2402923

The Hammocks is a planned community and census-designated place in Miami-Dade County, Florida, United States. It is part of the Miami metropolitan area of South Florida. The population was 59,480 at the 2020 census, up from 51,003 in 2010.

== Geography ==
The Hammocks is located about 6 miles (10 km) west of Kendall and 18 miles (29 km) southwest of downtown Miami.

The CDP and planned community encompass the area west of SW 137th Avenue, south of SW 88th Street, east of SW 177 Ave, and north of SW 120th St. It is bordered to the east by The Crossings and to the north by Kendall West and Kendale Lakes.

According to the United States Census Bureau, the CDP has a total area of 8.1 square miles (21 km^{2}), of which 7.9 square miles (20 km^{2}) are land and 0.2 square miles (0.52 km^{2}), or 2.64%, are water.

== Demographics ==
Historical population
Census	Pop.	Note	%±
1990	10,897		—
2000	47,379		334.8%
2010	51,003		7.6%
2020	59,480		16.6%

=== Racial and ethnic composition ===
The Hammocks CDP, Florida – Racial and ethnic composition Note: the US Census treats Hispanic/Latino as an ethnic category. This table excludes Latinos from the racial categories and assigns them to a separate category. Hispanics/Latinos may be of any race.
Race / Ethnicity (NH = Non-Hispanic)	Pop 2010	Pop 2020	% 2010	% 2020
White (NH)	7,119	5,846	13.96%	9.83%
Black or African American (NH)	2,430	2,036	4.76%	3.42%
Native American or Alaska Native (NH)	40	41	0.08%	0.07%
Asian (NH)	1,499	1,718	2.94%	2.89%
Pacific Islander or Native Hawaiian (NH)	7	8	0.01%	0.01%
Some other race (NH)	124	343	0.24%	0.58%
Mixed race or Multiracial (NH)	540	1,001	1.06%	1.68%
Hispanic or Latino (any race)	39,244	48,487	76.94%	81.52%
Total	51,003	59,480	100.00%	100.00%

=== 2020 census ===
As of the 2020 census, The Hammocks had a population of 59,480. The median age was 39.8 years. 20.0% of residents were under the age of 18 and 14.9% of residents were 65 years of age or older. For every 100 females there were 89.3 males, and for every 100 females age 18 and over there were 85.4 males age 18 and over.

100.0% of residents lived in urban areas, while 0.0% lived in rural areas.

There were 19,544 households in The Hammocks, of which 37.3% had children under the age of 18 living in them. Of all households, 52.2% were married-couple households, 12.7% were households with a male householder and no spouse or partner present, and 26.5% were households with a female householder and no spouse or partner present. About 15.7% of all households were made up of individuals and 5.5% had someone living alone who was 65 years of age or older.

There were 20,343 housing units, of which 3.9% were vacant. The homeowner vacancy rate was 0.5% and the rental vacancy rate was 6.0%.

Racial composition as of the 2020 census
Race	Number	Percent
White	16,746	28.2%
Black or African American	2,338	3.9%
American Indian and Alaska Native	180	0.3%
Asian	1,819	3.1%
Native Hawaiian and Other Pacific Islander	11	0.0%
Some other race	8,192	13.8%
Two or more races	30,194	50.8%
Hispanic or Latino (of any race)	48,487	81.5%

=== 2010 census ===
As of the 2010 United States census, there were 51,003 people, 15,967 households, and 12,620 families residing in the CDP.

=== 2000 census ===
As of the census of 2000, there were 47,379 people, 15,203 households, and 12,055 families residing in the CDP. The population density was 2,327.4 people/km^{2} (6,028 people/mi^{2}). There were 15,983 housing units at an average density of 785.1 units/km^{2} (2,033 units/mi^{2}). The racial makeup of the CDP was 78.64% White (23% were Non-Hispanic White), 6.88% African American or Black, 0.21% Native American, 3.25% Asian, 0.07% Pacific Islander, 6.54% from other races, and 4.41% from two or more races. 65.33% of the population were Hispanic or Latino of any race.

As of 2000, there were 15,203 households, out of which 46.5% had children under the age of 18 living with them, 58.4% were married couples living together, 16.1% had a female householder with no husband present, and 20.7% were non-families. 15.1% of all households were made up of individuals, and 1.8% had someone living alone who was 65 years of age or older. The average household size was 3.10 and the average family size was 3.47.

In 2000, the CDP population was spread out, with 28.3% under the age of 18, 10.3% from 18 to 24, 36.2% from 25 to 44, 18.9% from 45 to 64, and 6.3% who were 65 years of age or older. The median age was 32 years. For every 100 females, there were 90.3 males. For every 100 females age 18 and over, there were 86.5 males.

In 2000, the median income for a household in the CDP was $50,909, and the median income for a family was $54,444. Males had a median income of $35,159 versus $30,178 for females. The per capita income for the CDP was $18,962. About 7.0% of families and 8.6% of the population were below the poverty line, including 8.6% of those under age 18 and 11.3% of those age 65 or over.

As of 2000, speakers of Spanish as a first language accounted for 71.34% of residents, while English made up 22.82%, French was at 1.21%, French Creole at 0.94%, Portuguese 0.83%, and Arabic was 0.54% of the population. Tagalog made up 0.49% of the population.

== Economy ==
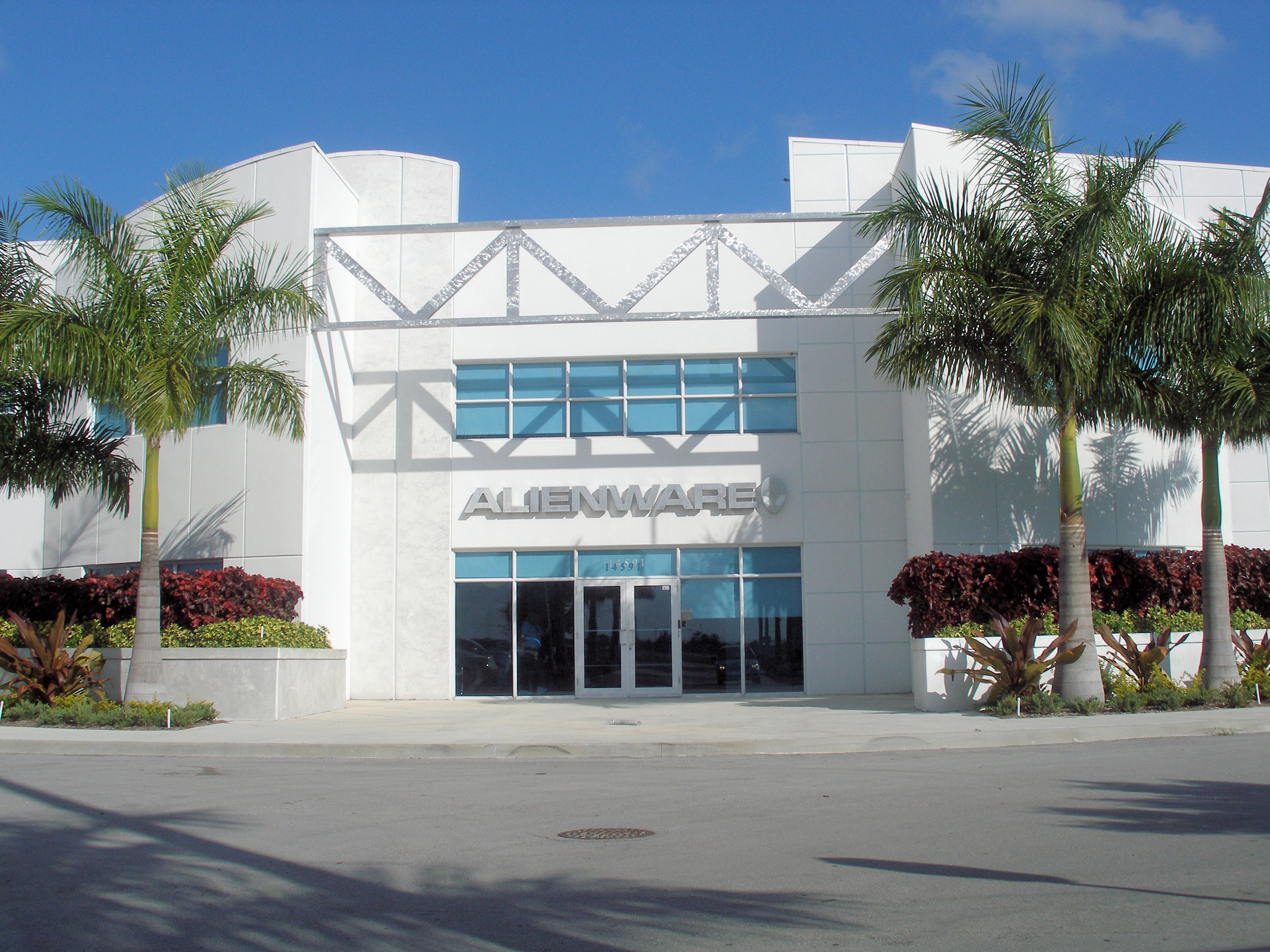
Alienware headquarters in The Hammocks

The headquarters for Alienware is located in The Hammocks.

== Government and infrastructure ==
The Miami-Dade Police Department operates The Hammocks District Station in The Hammocks.

== Education ==
Public education in The Hammocks is serviced by the Miami-Dade County Public Schools system.

Elementary schools

- Claude Pepper Elementary School
- Gilbert L. Porter Elementary School
- Oliver Hoover Elementary School
- Christina M. Eve Elementary School

Middle school

- Hammocks Middle School

High school

- Felix Varela High School

Private school

- Archbishop Coleman F. Carroll High School
- Our Lady of Lourdes Parish School - Established in 1997.
