= Metropolis at Dadeland =

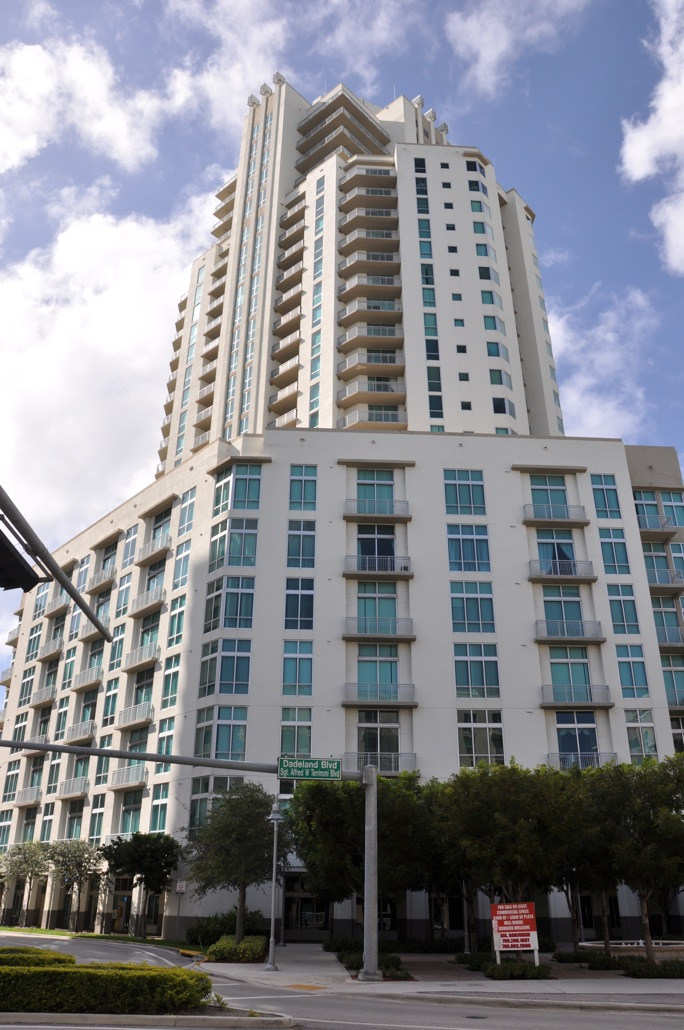

- Location within Florida

General information
- Status: Completed
- Type: Residential condominiums, retail (street level)
- Location: 9055/9066 SW 73rd CT, Miami, Florida, 33156; United States
- Coordinates: 25.6865°N 80.3140°W
- Construction started: 2003
- Completed: 2006

Height
- Roof: 314 ft (95.7 m)

Technical details
- Floor count: 28
- Lifts/elevators: 8

Design and construction
- Architects: Nichols Brosch Wurst Wolf & Associates
- Developer: Terra Group

Website
- []

Metropolis at Dadeland is a pair of skyscraper condos in the Dadeland neighborhood of Kendall, Miami-Dade County, Florida, United States. Metropolis at Dadeland consists of two near identical residential towers, Metropolis One and Metropolis Two. The towers provide retail and dining space on the street level, while the remaining floors are residential condo units. Specifically, floors two though seven are loft style units surrounding nine floors of parking. Floors eight through twenty-six are condo units and Penthouse units at the top. Floor eight contains most of the buildings amenities such as two pools, his and her saunas, library/work center, fitness center, club room with pool tables, and a Jacuzzi. Both towers stand at a height (architectural) of 313.58 ft.

Construction took three years (2003-2006) to complete both towers. In late November 2003, the foundation for the first tower was laid.

Metropolis at Dadeland is located in close proximity to:

- Dadeland South (Metrorail station)
- Dadeland Mall
- Dadeland Marriott
- Datran Towers Complex

== Gallery ==
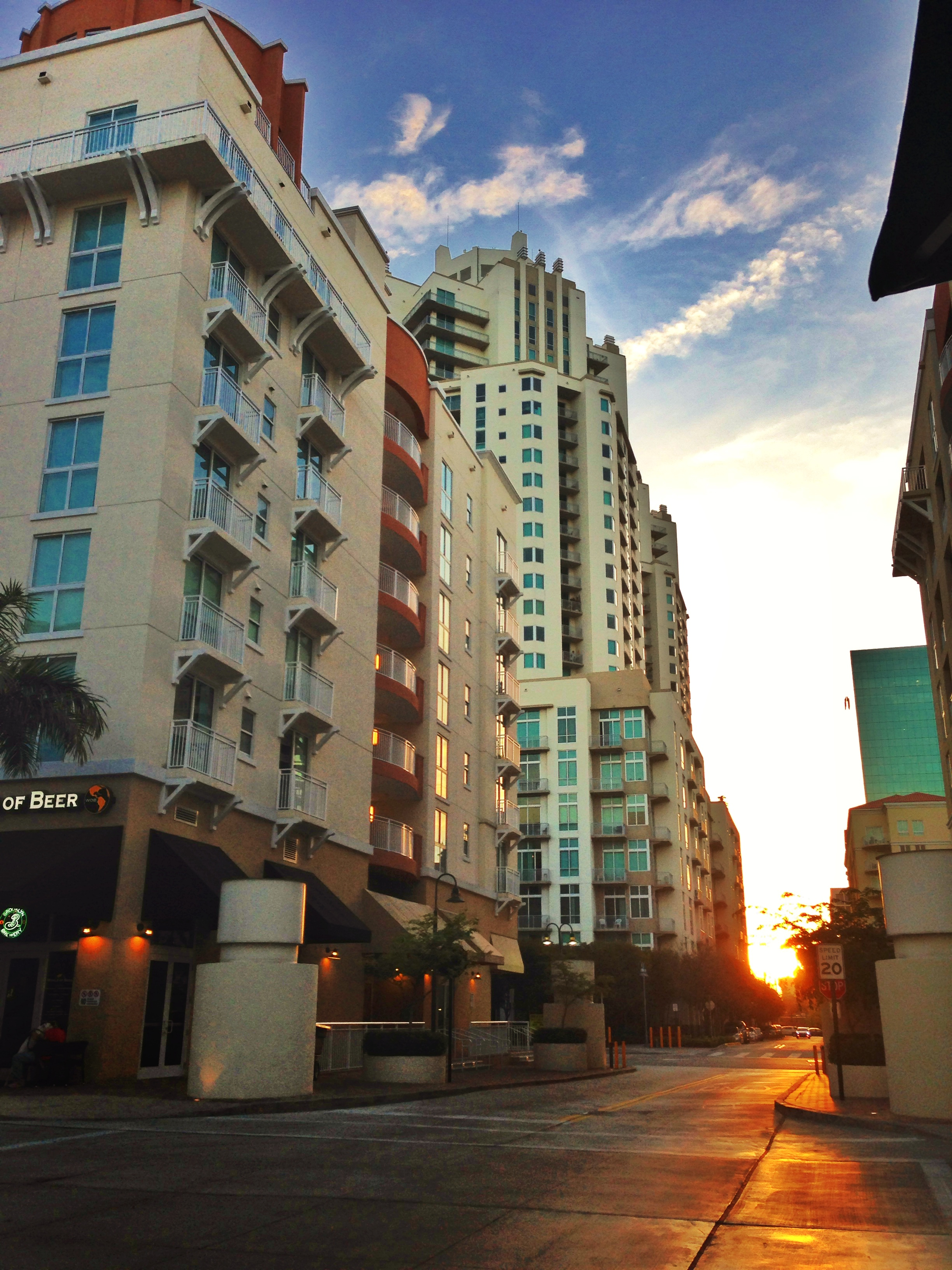
Metropolis One in distance with Downtown Dadeland in foreground

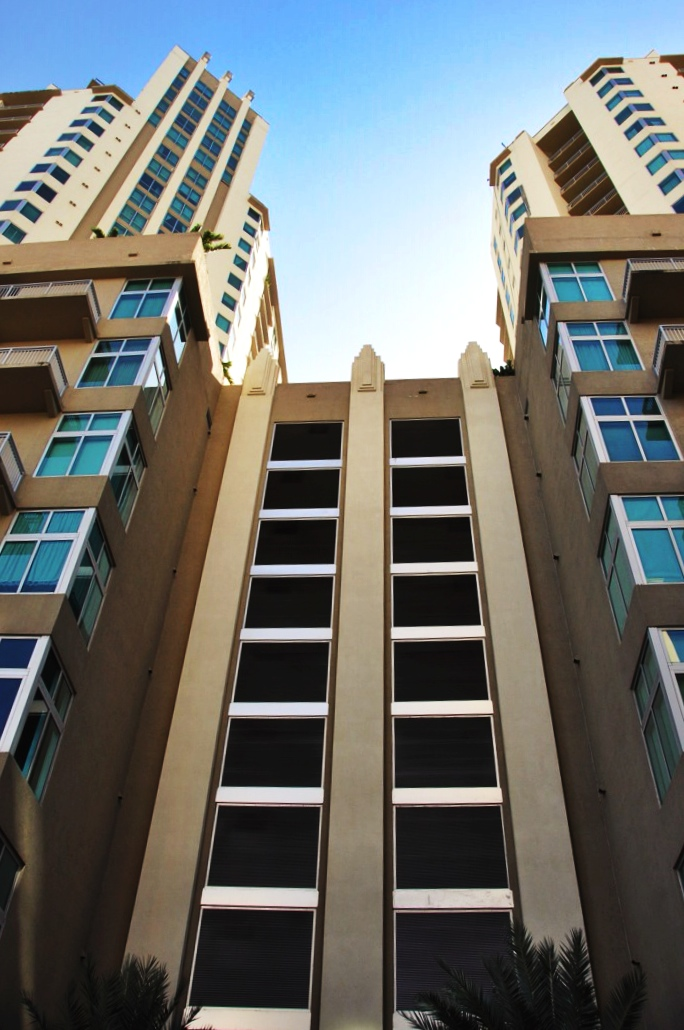
Metropolis at Dadeland - Looking up between Metropolis One and Metropolis Two
