= Dadeland Station =

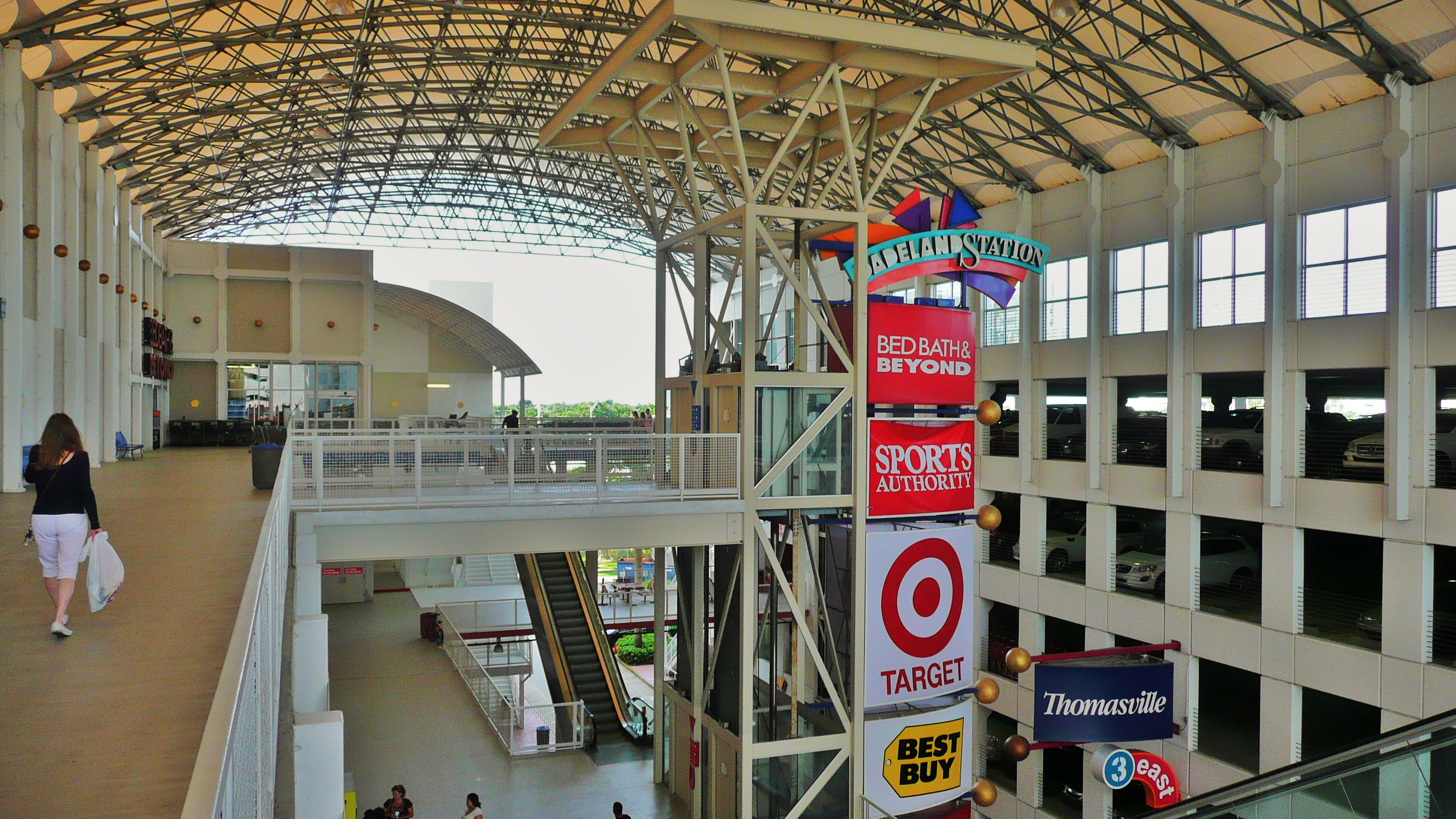
- Dadeland Station
- Location: Glenvar Heights, Florida, United States
- Coordinates: 25.693474°N 80.306419°W
- Address: 8310 South Dixie Highway
- Opened: October 7, 1996
- Developer: Berkowitz Development Group
- Owner: Berkowitz Development Group
- Architect: Robin Bosco Architects & Planners, Inc
- Num. of stores: 13
- Num. of anchor tenants: 5
- Floor area: 350,000 square feet (33,000 m^{2})
- Floors: 3
- Parking: 1,450

Dadeland Station is a lifestyle shopping center located in Dadeland, Florida in the metropolitan Miami suburb of Glenvar Heights, near the border with Kendall. It is located immediately across the Snapper Creek and within walking distance of the popular Dadeland Mall. It is vertically constructed.

Dadeland Station is directly served by the Miami Metrorail at Dadeland North station.

== Stores ==
- Michaels
- Dick's Sporting Goods (formerly Sports Authority)
- Best Buy
- Target
- PetSmart
- Lan-Pan Asian Cafe
- Starbucks (Inside Target)
- Pizza Hut Express (Inside Target)
- Hair Cuttery
- Nails by VN
- Avis & Budget Car Rental
- Enterprise Car Rental
- Zaniac Tutoring Services

== The Towers of Dadeland ==
Located directly across from Dadeland Station on 84th street in front of Michaels is Towers of Dadeland apartment building. On the ground level you will find the following businesses

- Moto Pizza Cafe and Grill
- Hair Color Salon
