= Downtown Dadeland =

Coordinates: 25.689°N 80.313°W

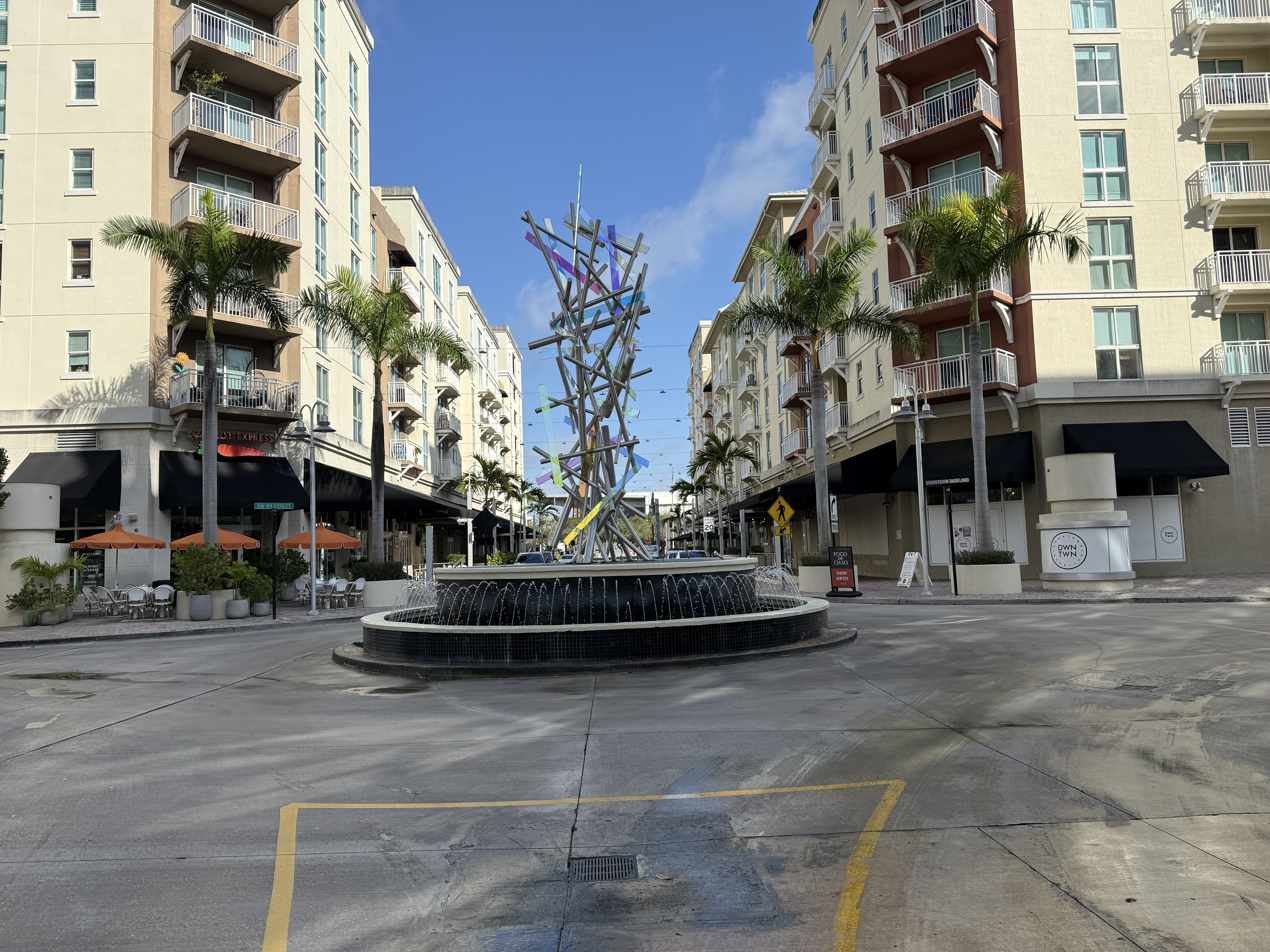
Downtown Dadeland

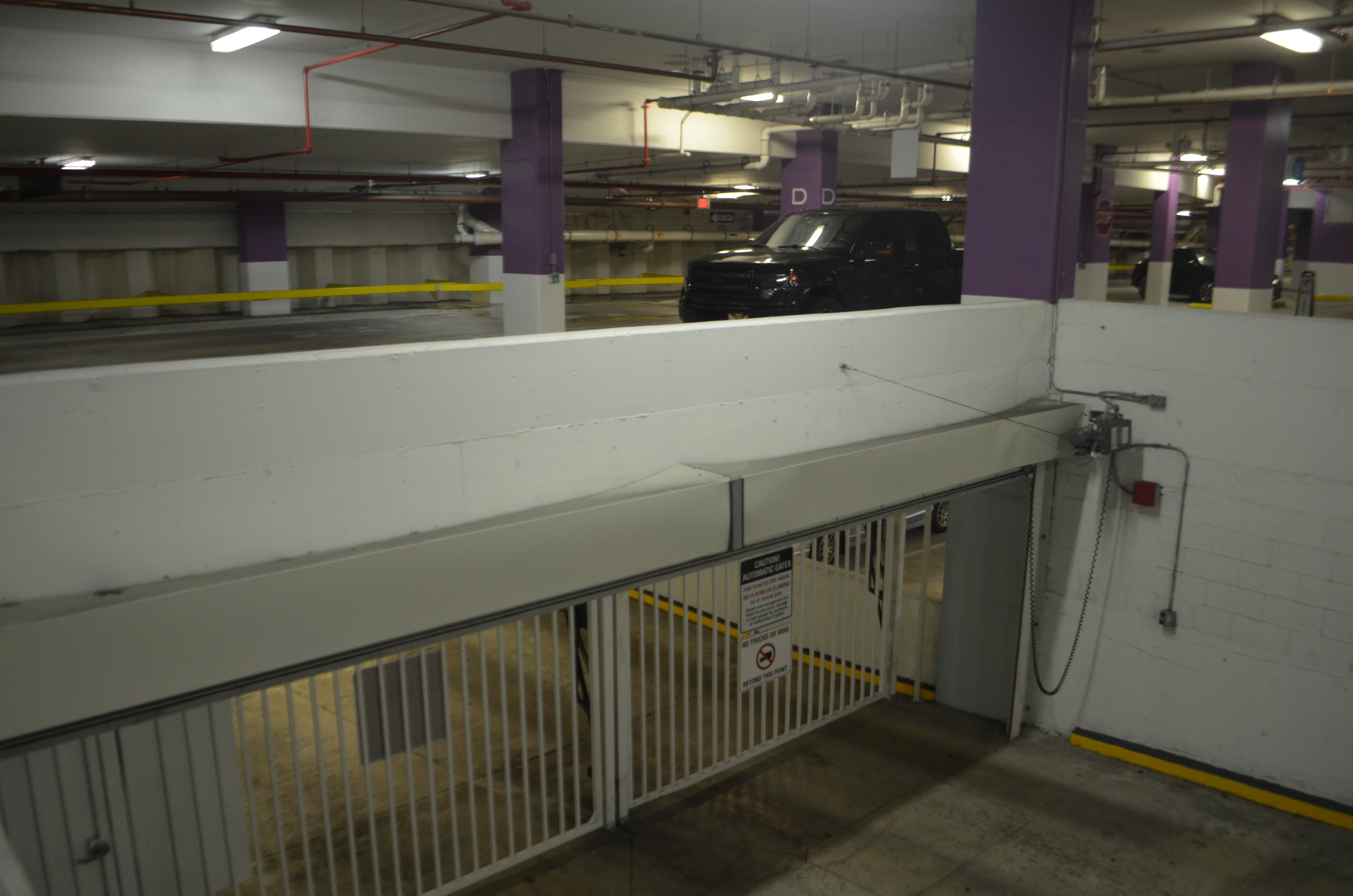
First level is public, B2 level is for residents.

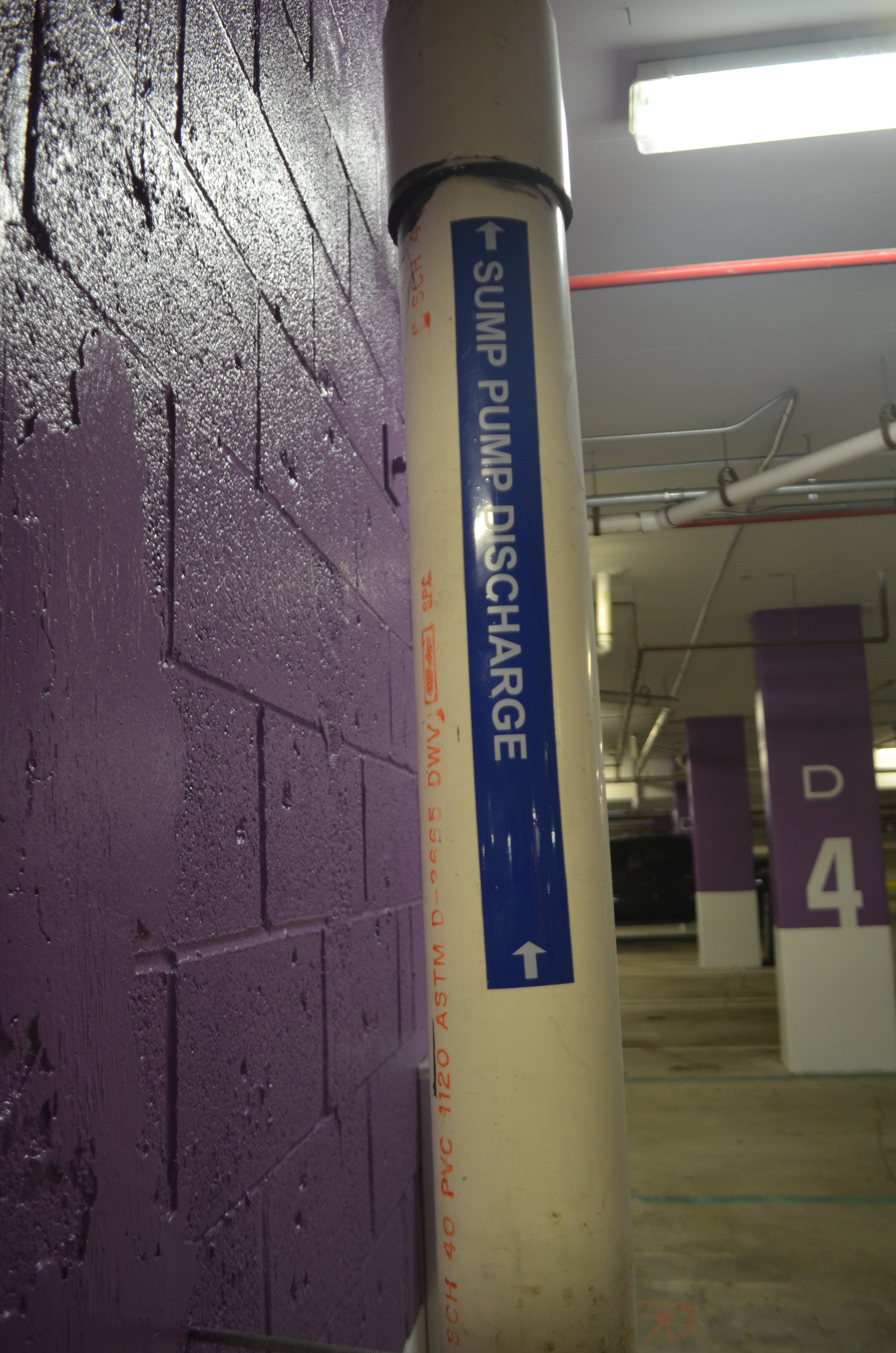
Sump pump discharge pipe.

Downtown Dadeland is an urban residential and retail development in Dadeland, Kendall, Florida, USA. Dadeland is an edge city in Kendall, which is part of unincorporated Miami-Dade County. Downtown Dadeland was completed in 2005, during a South Florida real estate boom. Notably, the 7.5-acre (3.0-hectare) development contains 15 acres (6.1 hectares) of parking on two underground levels, unprecedented in South Florida, which averages under 10 feet (3.0 m) of elevation AMSL. Since then, some other projects have pursued more than one sub-grade level, including Brickell City Centre in the Brickell district of Downtown Miami. Underground development in the Miami area is complicated and expensive, due to the high water table (low elevation). A project on Fort Lauderdale beach planned three levels of underground parking, but revised plans down to a single level mechanical parking garage. The mixed-use development is adjacent to Dadeland South station, the southern terminus of the Metrorail system, which saw significant ridership increases in the 21st century after many transit-oriented developments such as Dadeland were completed. Underground parking, including -1.5 and greater depths, began to become more common in the 2010s, pressured by building codes, aesthetics, and economics.

== See also ==
- Transportation in South Florida#Underground parking
