= Brickell station =

Miami-Dade Transit metro station

●● Brickell
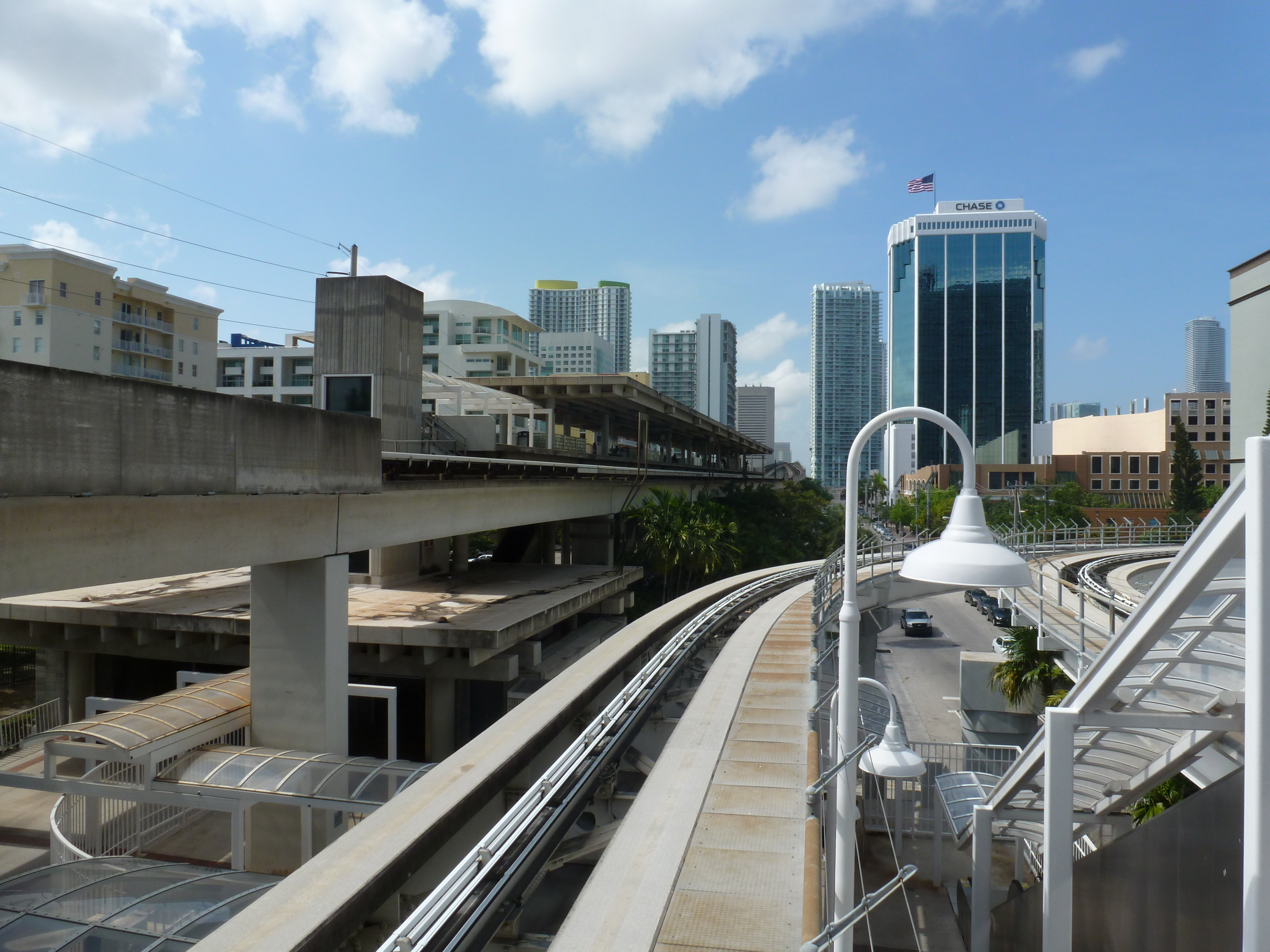
- Brickell Metrorail platform seen from the adjoining Metromover platform

General information
- Location: 1001 SW 1st Avenue; Miami, Florida
- Coordinates: 25°45′49″N 80°11′43″W
- Owner: MDT
- Platforms: 2 island platforms
- Tracks: 4
- Connections: Metrobus: 8, 24, 26, 207, 208, 400

Construction
- Parking: No
- Accessible: Yes

Other information
- Station code: BKL

History
- Opened: May 20, 1984 (Metrorail); May 26, 1994 (Metromover)

Passengers
- 2012: 1.317 million (Metrorail) ▲7.9%

Services
| Preceding station | Miami-Dade Transit | Following station |
|---|---|---|
| Vizcaya toward Dadeland South | Green Line | Government Center toward Palmetto |
| Vizcaya toward Dadeland South | Orange Line | Government Center toward Miami Int'l Airport |
| Financial District Terminus | Brickell Loop | Tenth Street Promenade toward Downtown |
Former services
| Preceding station | Miami-Dade Transit | Following station |
|---|---|---|
| Dadeland North toward Dadeland South | Downtown Express | Government Center Terminus |
Location

Brickell station is a Metrorail and Metromover rapid transit station in Miami, Florida, serving the Metrorail system's Green & Orange Lines and the Metromover system's Brickell Loop. One of the core stations of Miami's public transport network, it serves the financial district of Brickell. Combined, the Metrorail and Metromover station complex at Brickell sees roughly 8,430 boardings each weekday, making it the Metrorail system's second-busiest station.

== Location ==
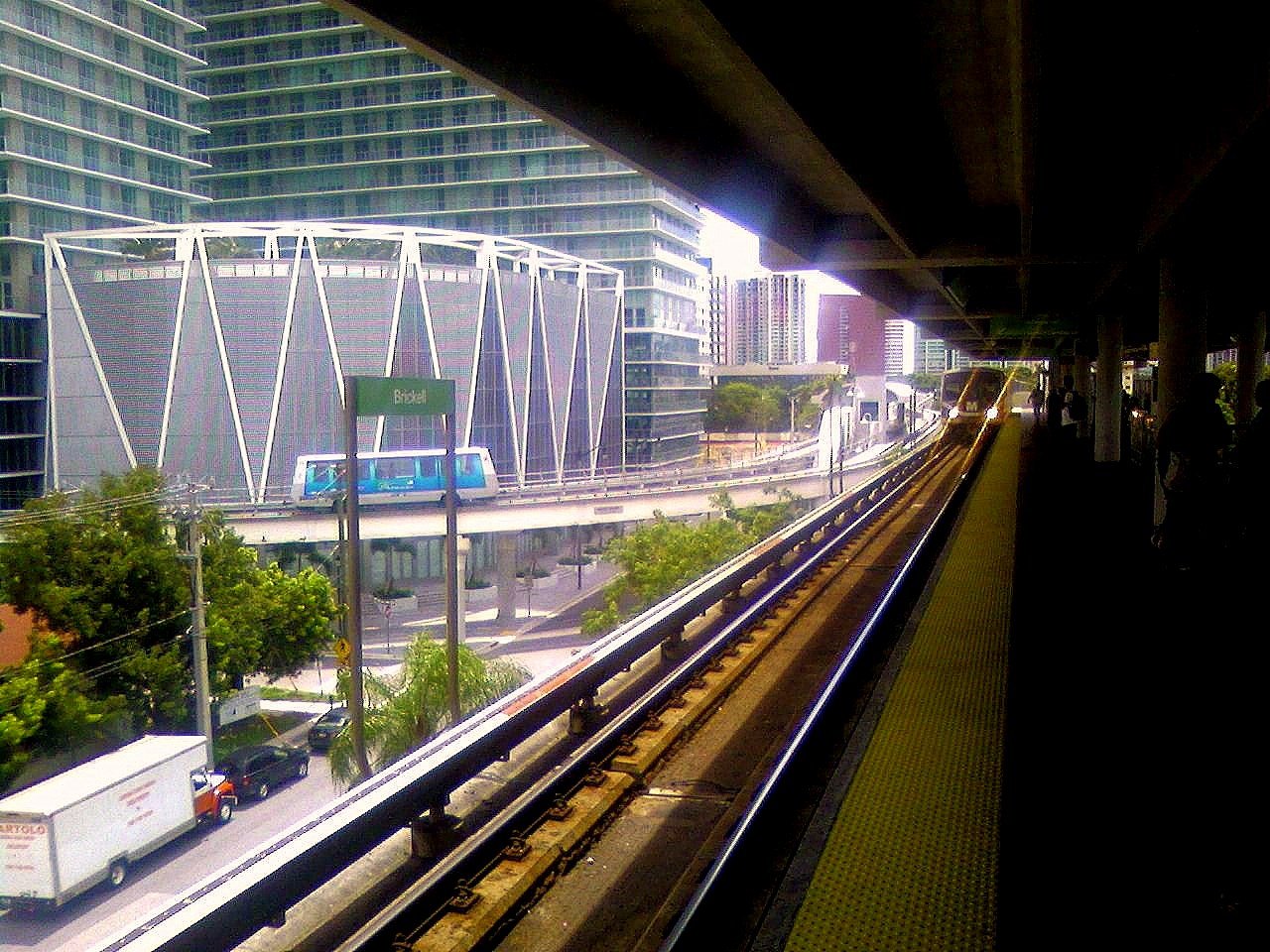
Metrorail and Metromover arriving at the station

The Brickell station is located in the median of SW 1st Avenue at its intersection with SW 11th Street in the central Miami neighborhood of Brickell. Excluding nearby Metromover stations, it is the closest rail stop to attractions such as Brickell Key, Mary Brickell Village, Brickell Avenue and Simpson Park.

=== Transit-oriented development ===
Like other rail stations in Miami's central business district, Brickell has been the focal point for significant transit-oriented development (TOD), particularly in the real estate boom of the 2000s and 2010s. New developments such as Axis at Brickell Village, Infinity at Brickell and Plaza on Brickell are all within a short distance of the station, as are numerous other residential and commercial projects. Once considered a failed example of TOD, and referred to as only "transit-adjacent development", over the past few years Brickell (Metromover) ridership has risen from approximately fifth place to as high as second place for some months in 2015 and 2016. Metrorail ridership growth at this station also outpaced most other stations, and by June 2016, it was the second highest ridership station on the Metrorail as well amid heavy losses at some stations, namely Dadeland South and Dadeland North.

== History ==
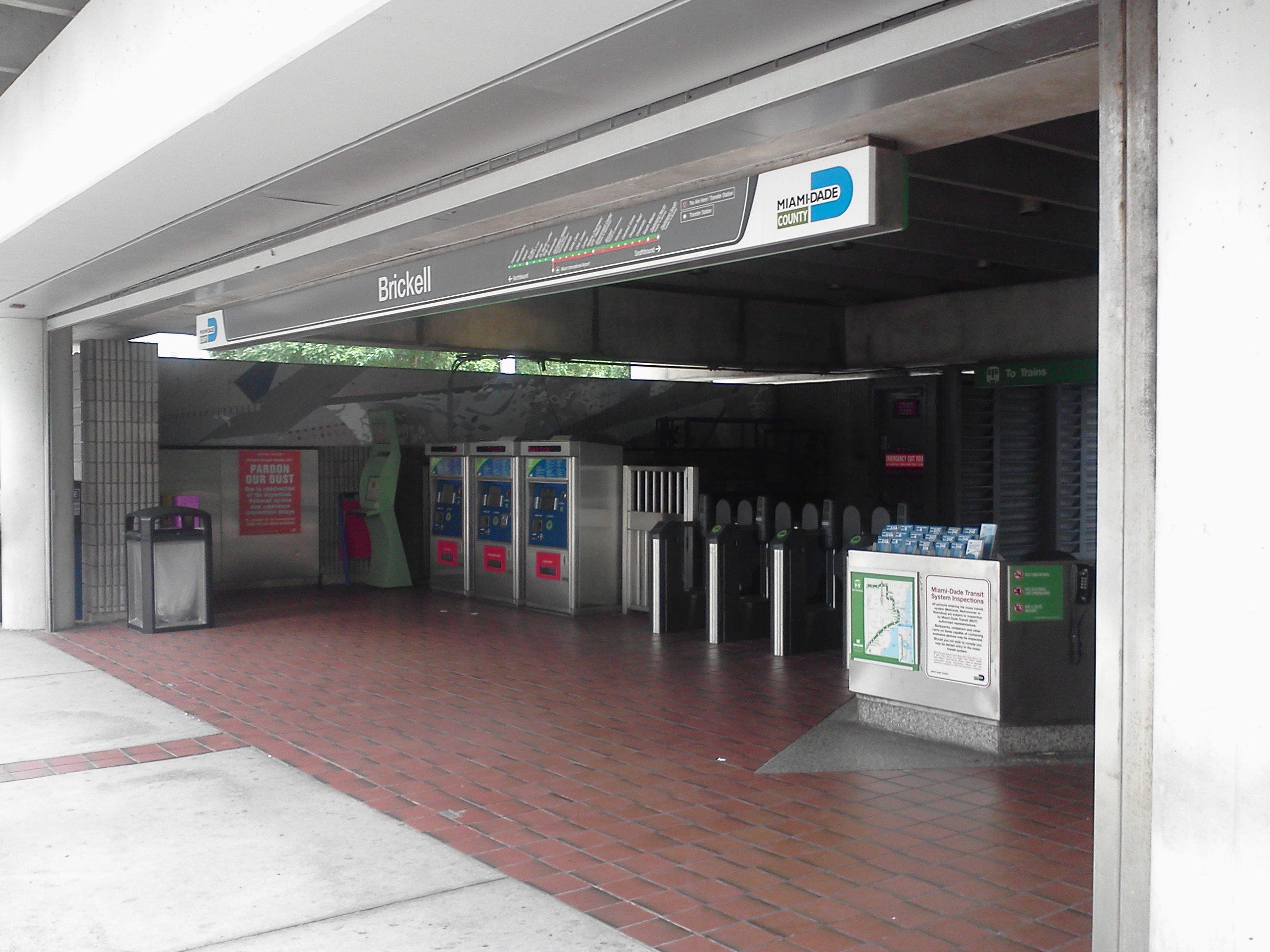
North entrance to the station

One of the original Metrorail stations, Brickell opened along with the initial stretch of the system from Dadeland South to Historic Overtown/Lyric Theatre, then called "Overtown." The Metromover station opened ten years later on May 26, 1994.

It featured as a level in the videogame Hotline Miami.

== Station layout ==
The Metrorail station and Metromover station are located next to each other and are connected by an overhang. The Metrorail station can hold up to six cars and has a canopy covering most of the platform. The Metromover platform can hold up to two Metromover cars and is completely covered.

== Gallery ==
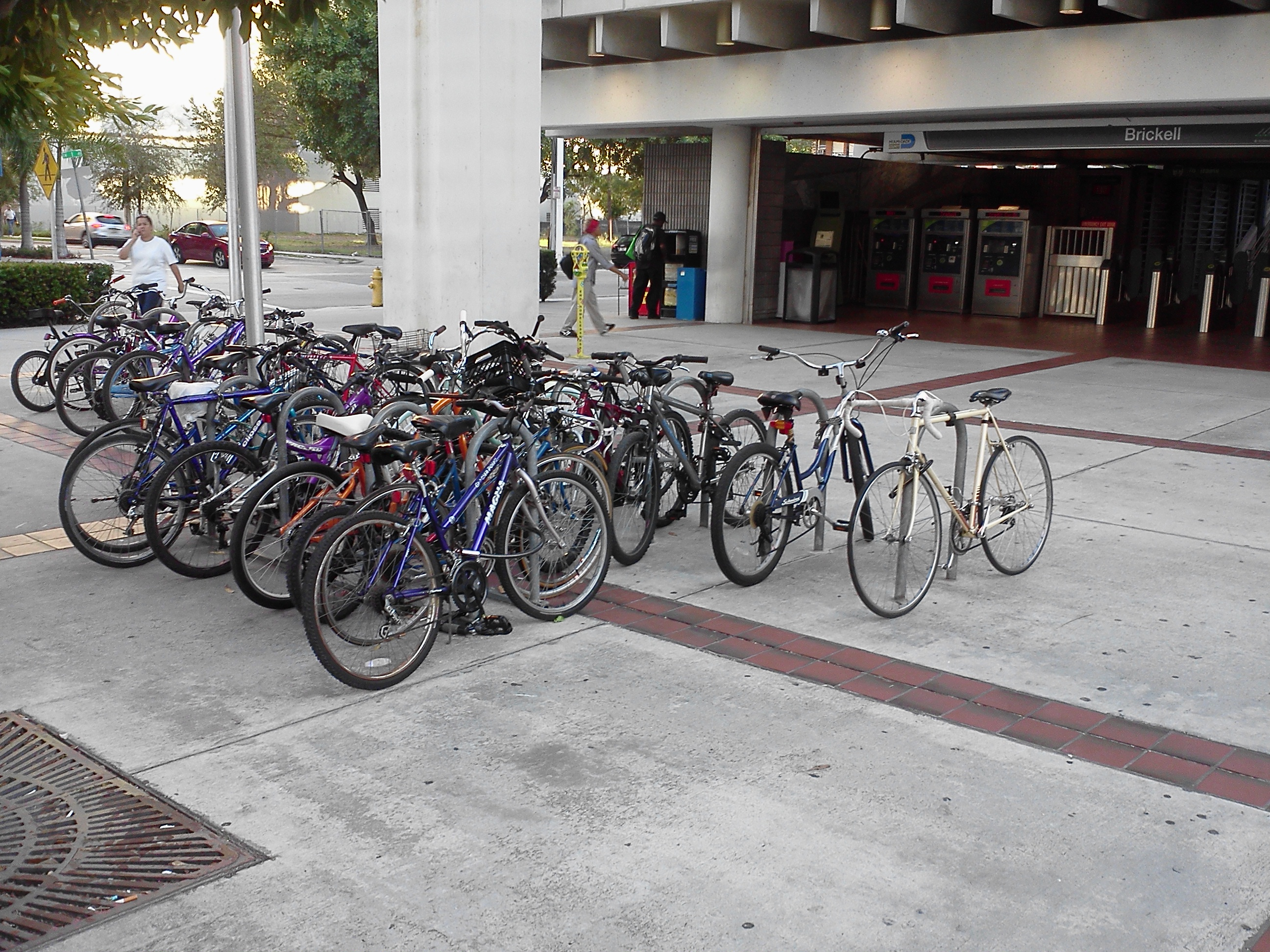
A busy bike and ride rack at Brickell station

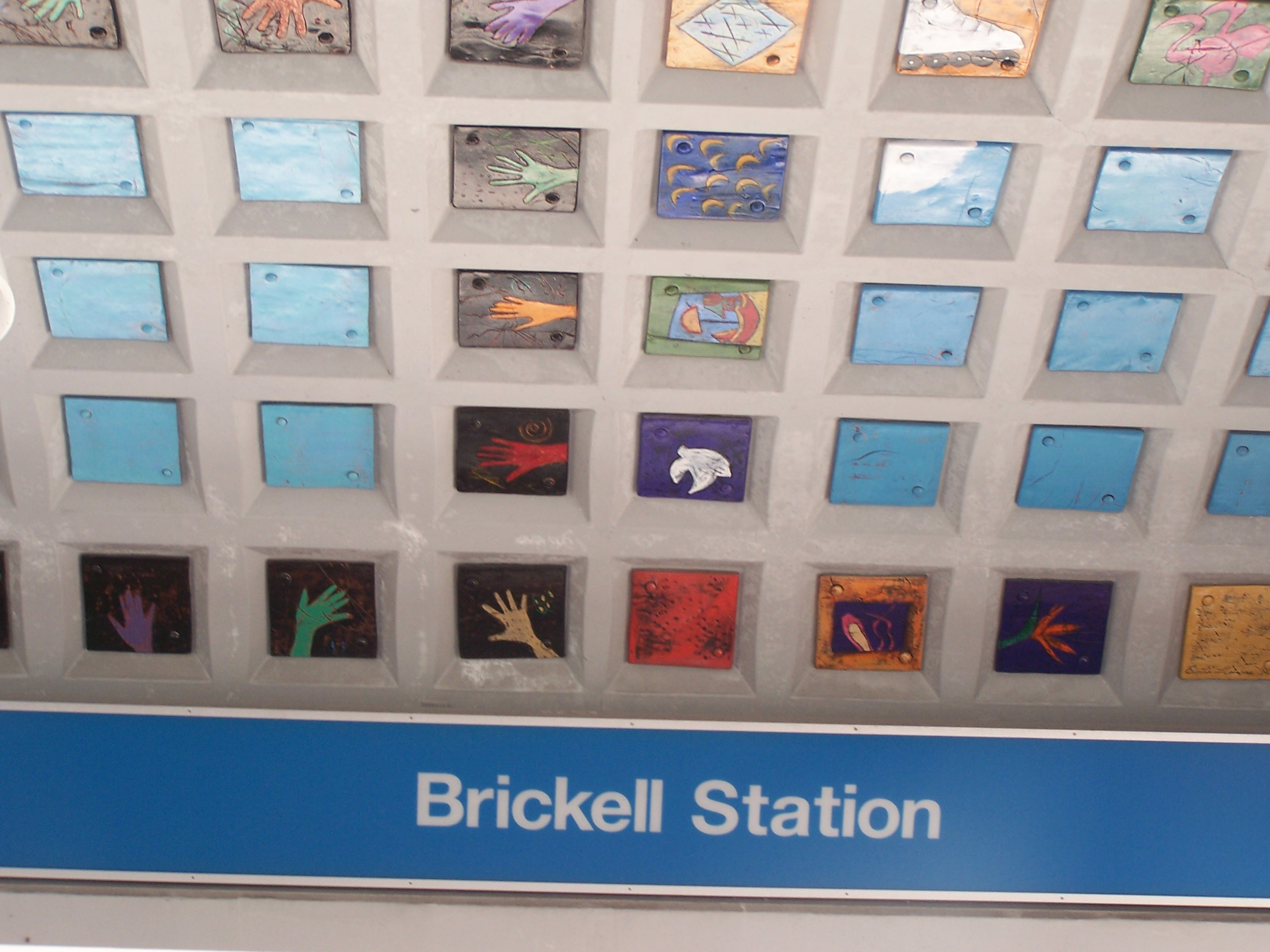
Decorated roof of the Metrmover station

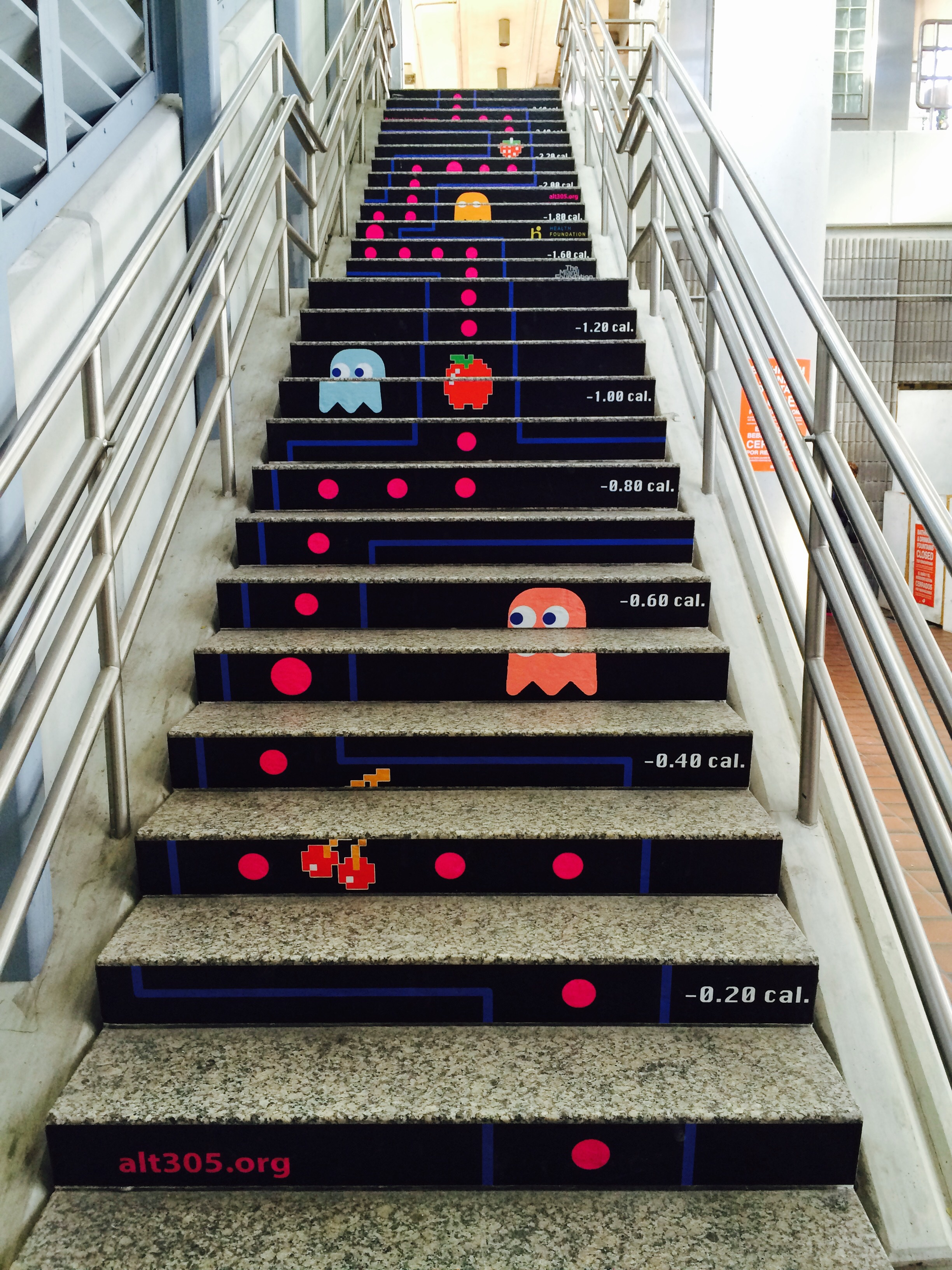
Invader's addition to the station

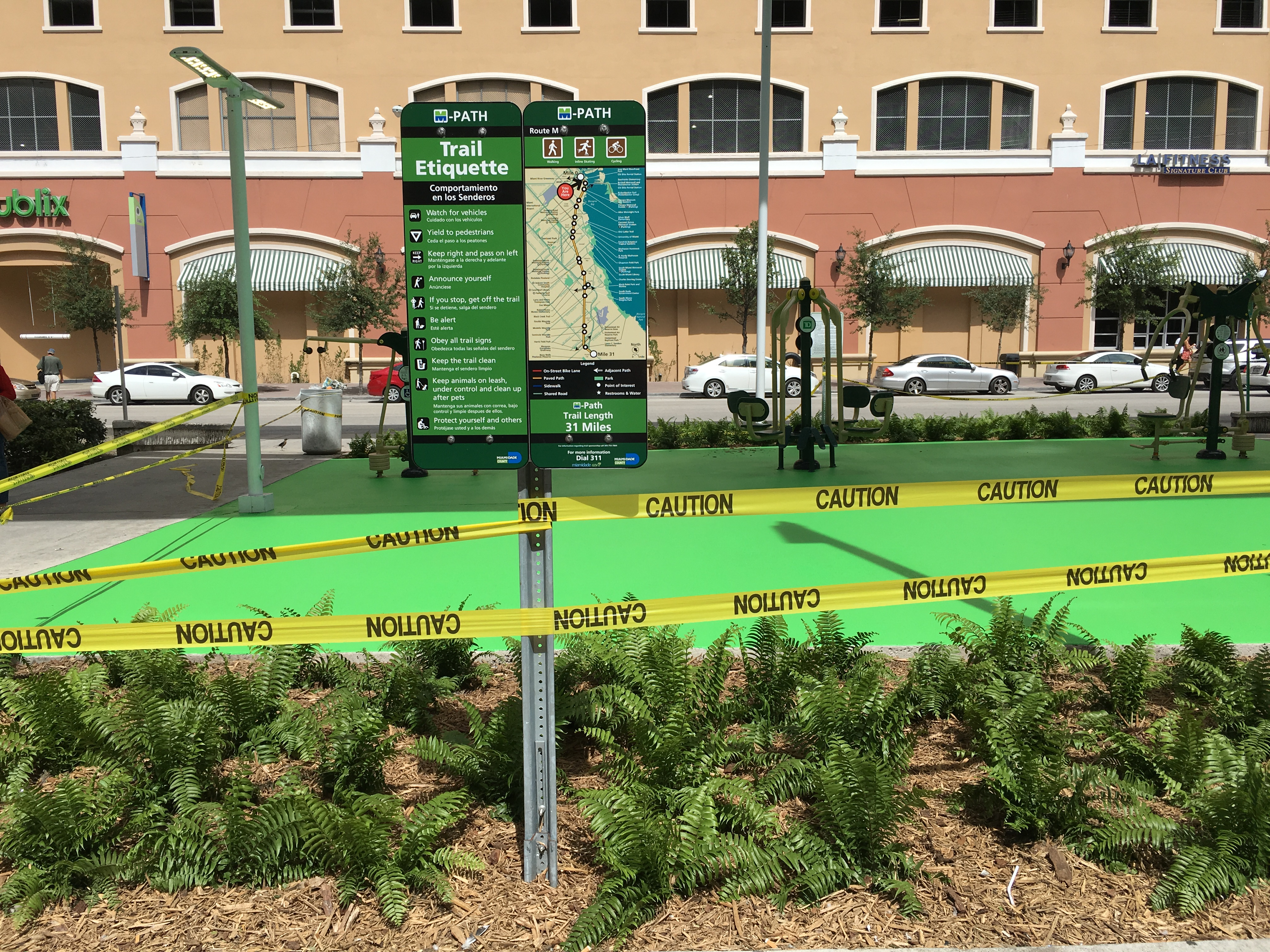
New exercise park under the station in 2016, and MetroPath sign
