= Dadeland North station =

Miami-Dade Transit metro station

●● Dadeland North
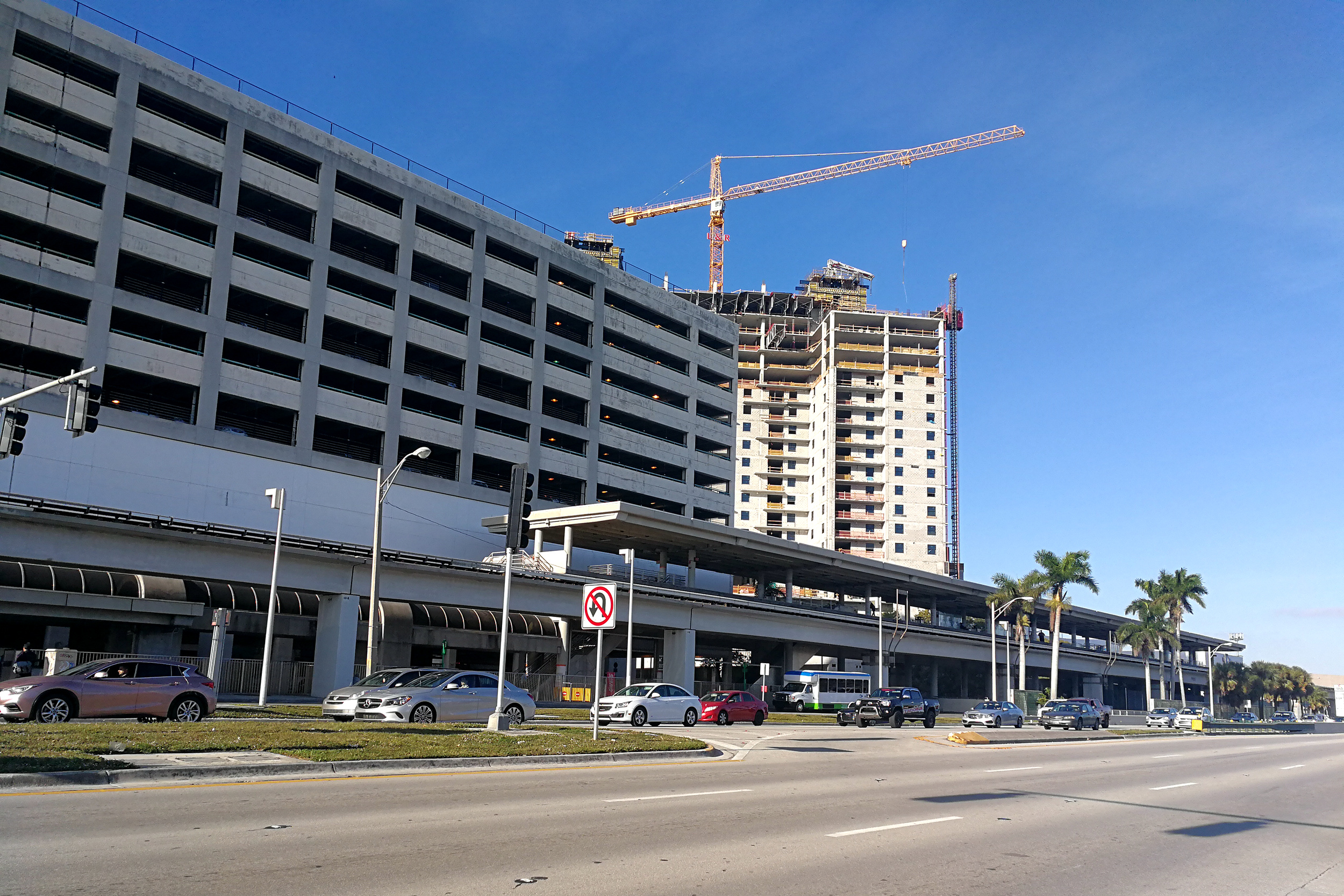
- Dadeland North station, January 2018

General information
- Location: 8310 South Dixie Highway; Miami, Florida
- Coordinates: 25°41′30″N 80°18′18″W
- Owner: Miami-Dade County
- Platforms: 1 island platform
- Tracks: 2
- Connections: Metrobus: 73, 87, 88, 104, 104A, 204, 272, 288, 400

Construction
- Parking: 2,032 spaces
- Cycle facilities: Racks, MetroPath
- Accessible: Yes

Other information
- Station code: DLN

History
- Opened: May 20, 1984

Passengers
- 2012: 2 million ▲11%

Services
Preceding station	Miami-Dade Transit	Following station
Dadeland South Terminus	Green Line	South Miami toward Palmetto
Dadeland South Terminus	Orange Line	South Miami toward Miami Int'l Airport
Former services
Preceding station	Miami-Dade Transit	Following station
Dadeland South Terminus	Downtown Express	Brickell toward Government Center
Location

Dadeland North station is a station on the Metrorail rapid transit system in the Dadeland district of Glenvar Heights, Florida. This station is located at the intersection of South Dixie Highway (US 1) and Southwest 83rd Street on the Snapper Creek, two blocks north of Kendall Drive and two blocks south from the US 1–Snapper Creek Expressway (SR 878) junction. It opened to service May 20, 1984.

It is located along the border of Kendall and Glenvar Heights, two census-designated places. The station is in both areas.

Dadeland North serves the communities of Dadeland, Glenvar Heights, Kendall, and Pinecrest, as well as serving the Dadeland Station and Dadeland Mall shopping centers.

== Station layout ==
The station has two tracks served by an island platform, with a parking garage immediately west of the platform.

== Gallery ==
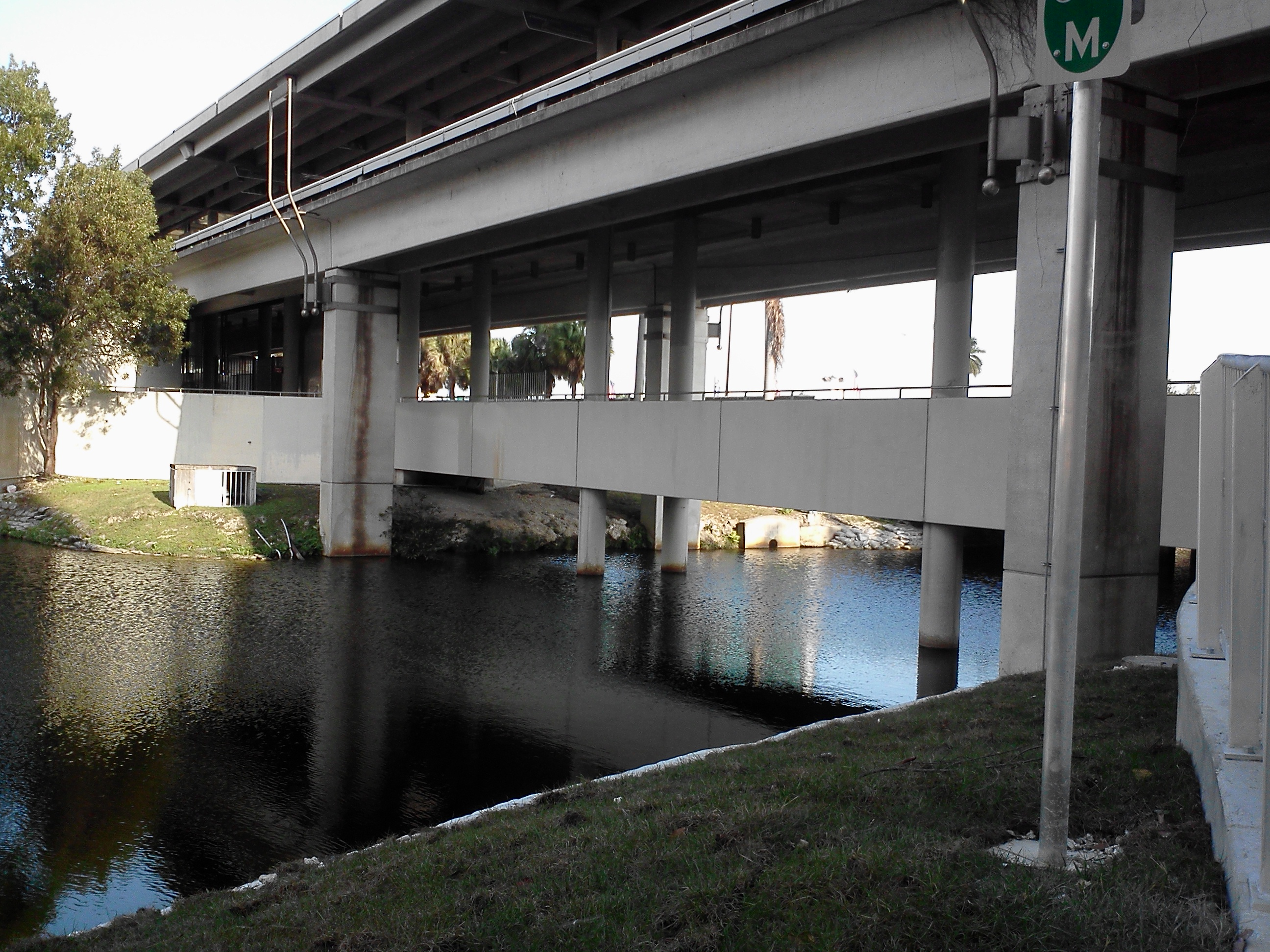
The Dadeland North station and MetroPath are built over Snapper Creek.

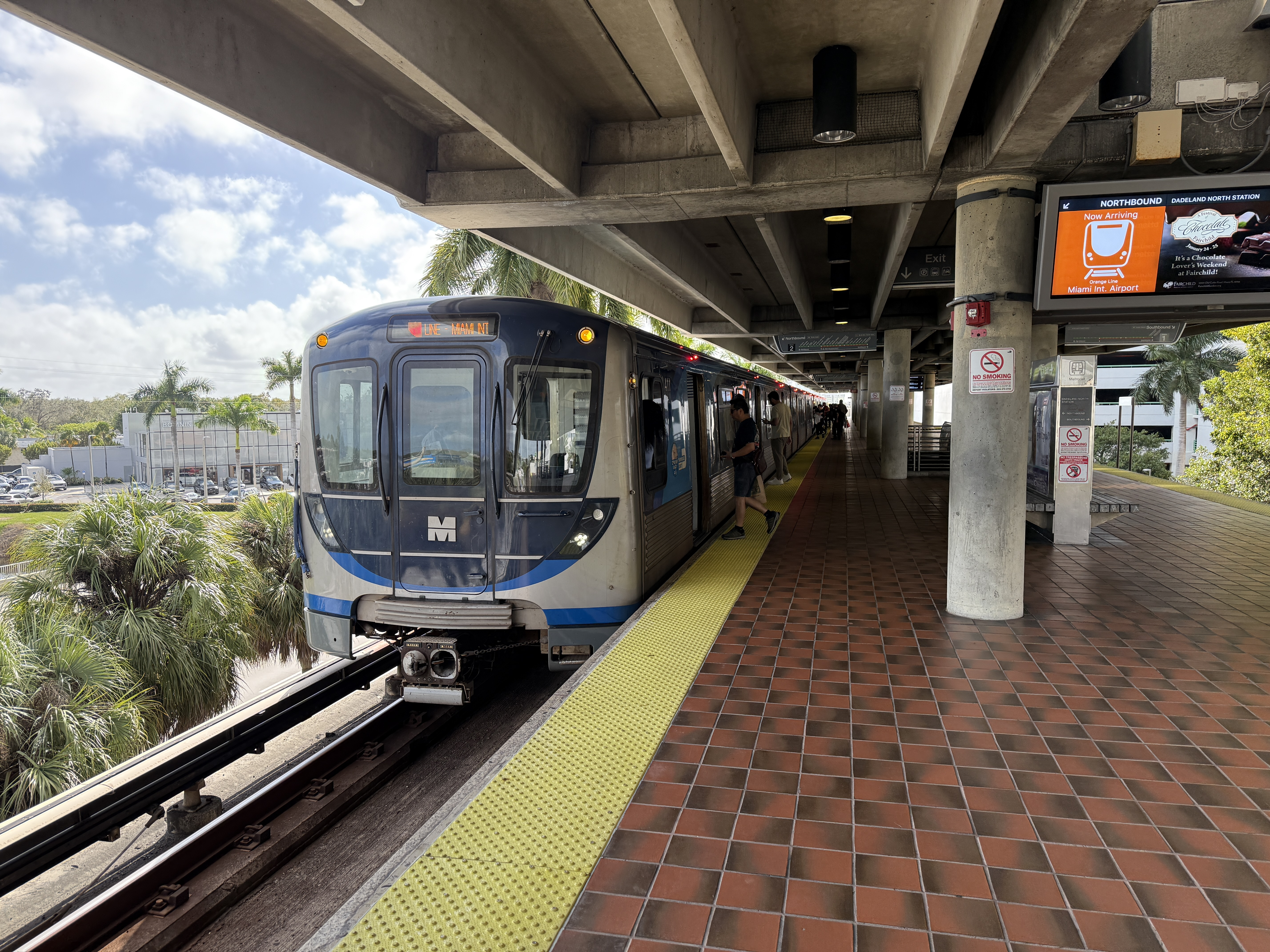
A northbound Orange Line trains stops at Dadeland North station
