= Town Center One =

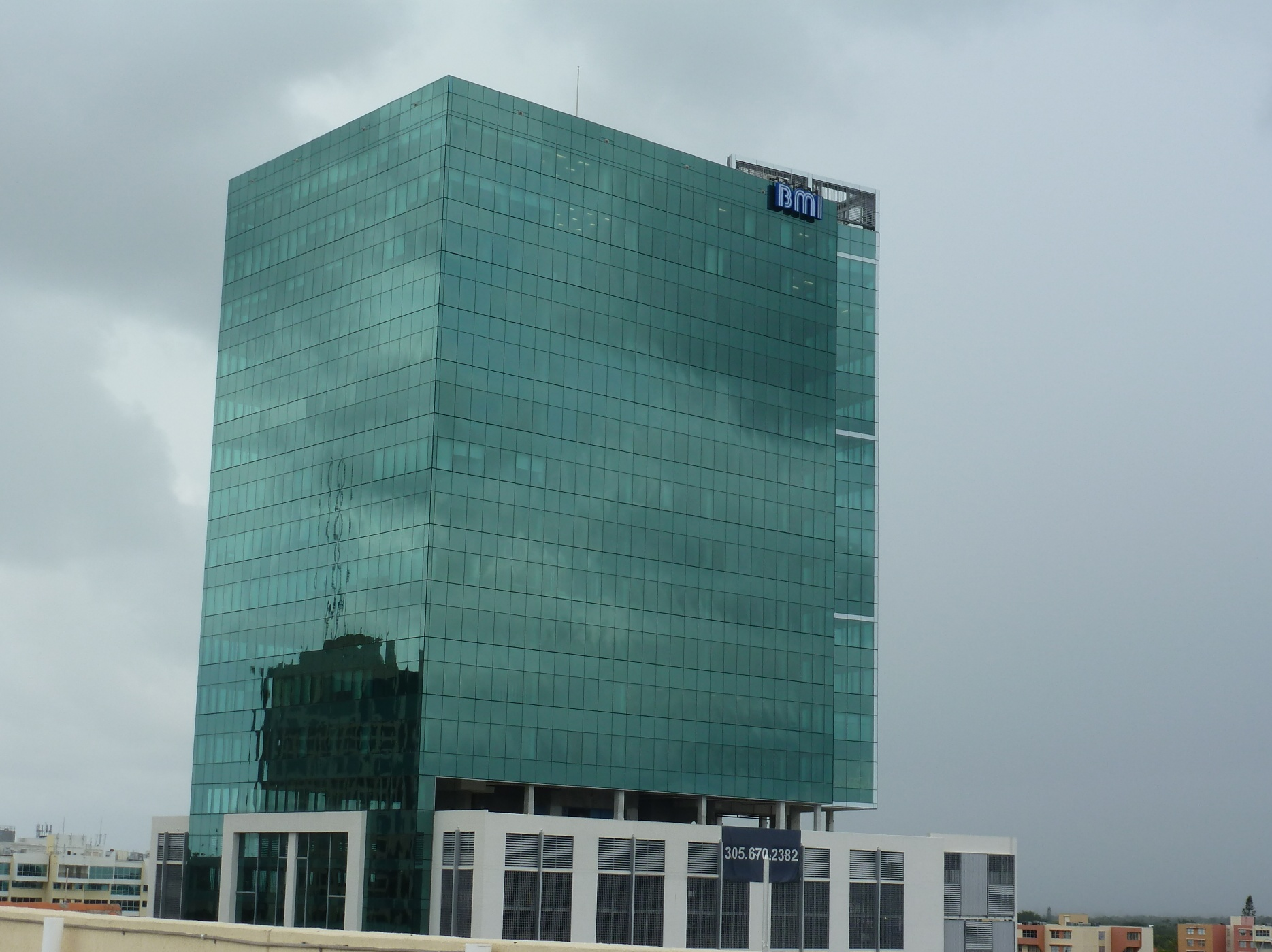
- Interactive map of the Town Center One area

General information
- Status: Completed
- Type: Commercial office
- Location: 8950 SW 74th Ct, Miami, Florida, 33156; United States
- Coordinates: 25.6865°N 80.3140°W
- Construction started: 2007
- Completed: 2009
- Owner: Dadeland Parcel C

Height
- Roof: 295 ft (89.9 m)

Technical details
- Floor count: 24
- Floor area: 210,992 sq ft (19,601.8 m^{2}) (marketable)

Design and construction
- Architects: Nichols Brosch Wurst Wolf & Associates
- Developer: Dayco Group
- Structural engineer: Bliss & Nyitray
- Main contractor: Plaza Construction

Town Center One is a high-rise building located in Dadeland, an urban area in unincorporated Miami-Dade County, Florida. Constructed from 2007 to 2009, it contains class A commercial office space and was built near the end of the United States housing bubble of the 2000s. The building reaches a height of about 295 feet (90 m), making it one of the taller buildings in Dadeland. The building stands out for its dark green glass curtain wall façade. This was the result of a design change; as the name implies, the building was intended to be the first of several buildings in a mixed-use development. Due to the Great Recession and a regional overbuilding of office space, the building sat largely vacant until several years after completion. In 2011, the majority of units went into foreclosure when a construction loan could not be repaid, which led to the restructuring of the building's finances in 2012 by its anchor tenant, BMI Companies.
