= Florida State Road 878 =

Highway in Florida

State Road 878
- Snapper Creek Expressway
- SR 878 highlighted in red

Route information
- Maintained by GMX
- Length: 2.658 mi (4.278 km) Additional length of westbound lanes: 0.460 miles (0.740 km)
- Existed: 1980–present

Major junctions
- West end: SR 874 in Kendall
- East end: US 1 near South Miami

Location
- Country: United States
- State: Florida
- Counties: Miami-Dade

Highway system
- Florida State Highway System; Interstate; US; State; Former; Pre‑1945; Toll; Scenic
← SR 876	→ SR 880

State Road 878 (SR 878), named the Snapper Creek Expressway, is a 2.7-mile (4.3 km) east–west toll road south of Miami, Florida, United States. The controlled-access expressway is named for the nearby Snapper Creek which runs parallel to SR 878. It acts as a spur route of SR 874 (Don Shula Expressway), providing access to U.S. Route 1 (US 1) near South Miami and local access to the eastern Kendall area while bypassing the Dadeland district. The road is maintained and tolled by the Greater Miami Expressway Agency (GMX).

== Route description ==
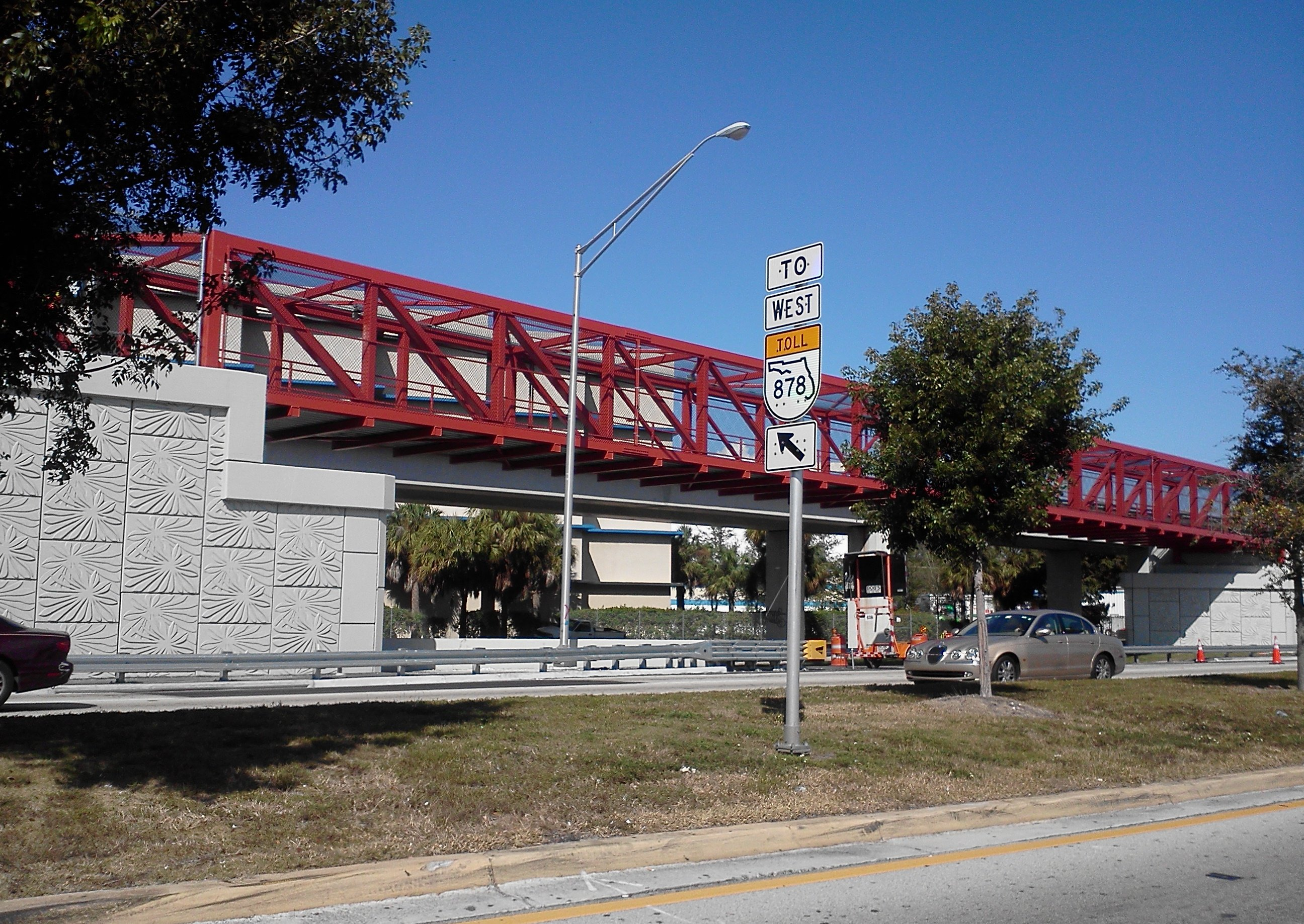
The MetroPath footbridge marks the entrance to SR 878 at its eastern terminus at US 1, near South Miami.

SR 878's western terminus is integrated into the Don Shula Expressway's interchange with SR 94 (Kendall Drive) across the boundary of the Kendall and Sunset districts. Motorists entering the Don Shula Expressway northbound from Kendall Drive are given the option of continuing onto SR 874 via a flyover, or else merging into the traffic leaving SR 874 for the Snapper Creek Expressway, which then heads under the Kendall Drive–Don Shula Expressway flyover. The westbound lanes of SR 878, however, pass over SR 874's mainline, and are then given an exclusive carriageway beside the southbound lanes for 0.46 miles (0.74 km), before merging into SR 874 just north of the Kendall Drive overpass. Southbound motorists from the Don Shula Expressway wishing to exit to Kendall Drive merge into this carriageway before leaving for SR 94 with those vehicles originating from the Snapper Creek Expressway. There is no direct connection for southbound motorists on SR 874 to head east on SR 878; likewise, westbound motorists on SR 878 cannot head north along SR 874 directly.

From here, SR 878 heads predominantly eastwards as a four-lane-wide expressway through residential neighborhoods for the remainder of its length, generally lying 0.5 miles (0.80 km) north of Kendall Drive. After approximately 0.4 miles (0.64 km), the Snapper Creek Expressway passes through the 87th Avenue toll gantry. It then meets Galloway Road (SR 973) shortly afterwards with a diamond interchange. The expressway then enters Glenvar Heights once it crosses SR 973 and remains in that district for the rest of its duration. Just before passing over the Palmetto Expressway (SR 826) without an interchange (approximately 1 mile (1.6 km) east of Galloway Road), SR 878 meets its second and final toll gantry.

About 0.3 miles (0.48 km) east of the Palmetto Expressway, SR 878 has a partial diamond interchange with Southwest 72nd Avenue, which only allows westbound entry to and eastbound exit from the Snapper Creek Expressway. Immediately afterwards, SR 878 turns to the southeast and prepares to meet its eastern terminus at the South Dixie Highway (US 1) at a surface intersection 0.6 miles (0.97 km) later, passing under the Metrorail line and associated MetroPath just before doing so. Traffic heading south along US 1 from eastbound SR 878 moves into a slip lane, while that wishing to head north along US 1 enters it at an oblique angle, aided by traffic signals. The only access onto SR 878 westbound from US 1 is for southbound traffic; motorists heading north along US 1 are guided to SR 878 by signage along Southwest 67th Avenue and Southwest 80th Street.

== Tolls ==
SR 878's tolls are entirely electronic: cash cannot be accepted along its length. Payment is done either via SunPass transponders or via toll-by-plate billing, the latter of which attracts a higher cost. Two toll gantries are located along the Snapper Creek Expressway, the first between the Don Shula Expressway and Galloway Road, and the second between Galloway Road and Southwest 72nd Avenue. The relationship between the tolling points and interchanges along SR 878 and SR 874 is that all motorists are charged at least one toll for using the road; there are no "free sections". As of July 1, 2013, the cost for a two-axle vehicle to travel the entire length of the Snapper Creek Expressway is $0.50 with a SunPass transponder, or $1.00 via the toll-by-plate program. Each additional axle on a vehicle attracts an extra $0.25 via SunPass or $0.50 via toll-by-plate for each toll gantry passed.

== History ==
Planning by Dade County for a road named the "Snapper Creek Expressway" was underway as early as 1958, with a final completion date set as late as 1975. Funding for SR 878's construction was made available in 1971 by the Florida Department of Transportation as part of plans to construct the Snapper Creek Expressway along with the South Dade Expressway (now known as the Don Shula Expressway) and the West Dade Expressway (now known as the Homestead Extension of Florida's Turnpike), with an expected completion date of early 1973. Construction was halted in 1974 due to money issued from county bonds for expressway building running out, and the road was left partially completed; however, $8 million in federal emergency funds was directed to completing the expressway in late 1977. The Snapper Creek Expressway, designated SR 878, finally opened in early 1980, with the Southwest 72nd Avenue interchange opening a few weeks later.

No tolls were collected along SR 878, in line with the road's original plans, until MDX's initial roll-out of open road tolling from late 2009 to mid-2010 on its road network. Tolling along the Snapper Creek Expressway began on July 17, 2010. The move to toll the Snapper Creek Expressway angered local residents, but was tempered by MDX's move to investigate toll rebates. Initially, tolls were $0.25 for SunPass users, with a $0.15 surcharge for motorists using the toll-by-plate system. The toll-by-plate rate increased by ten cents on July 1, 2013, to $0.50 per toll gantry passed, while the SunPass rate was unaffected.

== Exit list ==
The entire route is in Miami-Dade County. All exits are unnumbered.

Location	mi	km	Destinations	Notes
Kendall	0.000	0.000	SR 874 south to Florida's Turnpike Extension south	
Kendall	0.000	0.000	SR 94 (Kendall Drive / Southwest 88th Street)	Westbound exit and eastbound entrance; other movements from SR 874
Sunset	0.3	0.48	Toll gantry	
Sunset–Glenvar Heights line	0.677	1.090	SR 973 (Southwest 87th Avenue / Galloway Road)	
Glenvar Heights	1.6	2.6	Toll gantry	
Glenvar Heights	2.218	3.570	Southwest 72nd Avenue	Eastbound exit and westbound entrance
Glenvar Heights	2.658	4.278	US 1 (Pinecrest Parkway / Dixie Highway) – South Miami	No left turn from US 1 north to SR 878 west
1.000 mi = 1.609 km; 1.000 km = 0.621 mi: Electronic toll collection; Incomplete access
