= Axis at Brickell Village =

Building complex in Florida, United States

Axis at Brickell Village North Tower
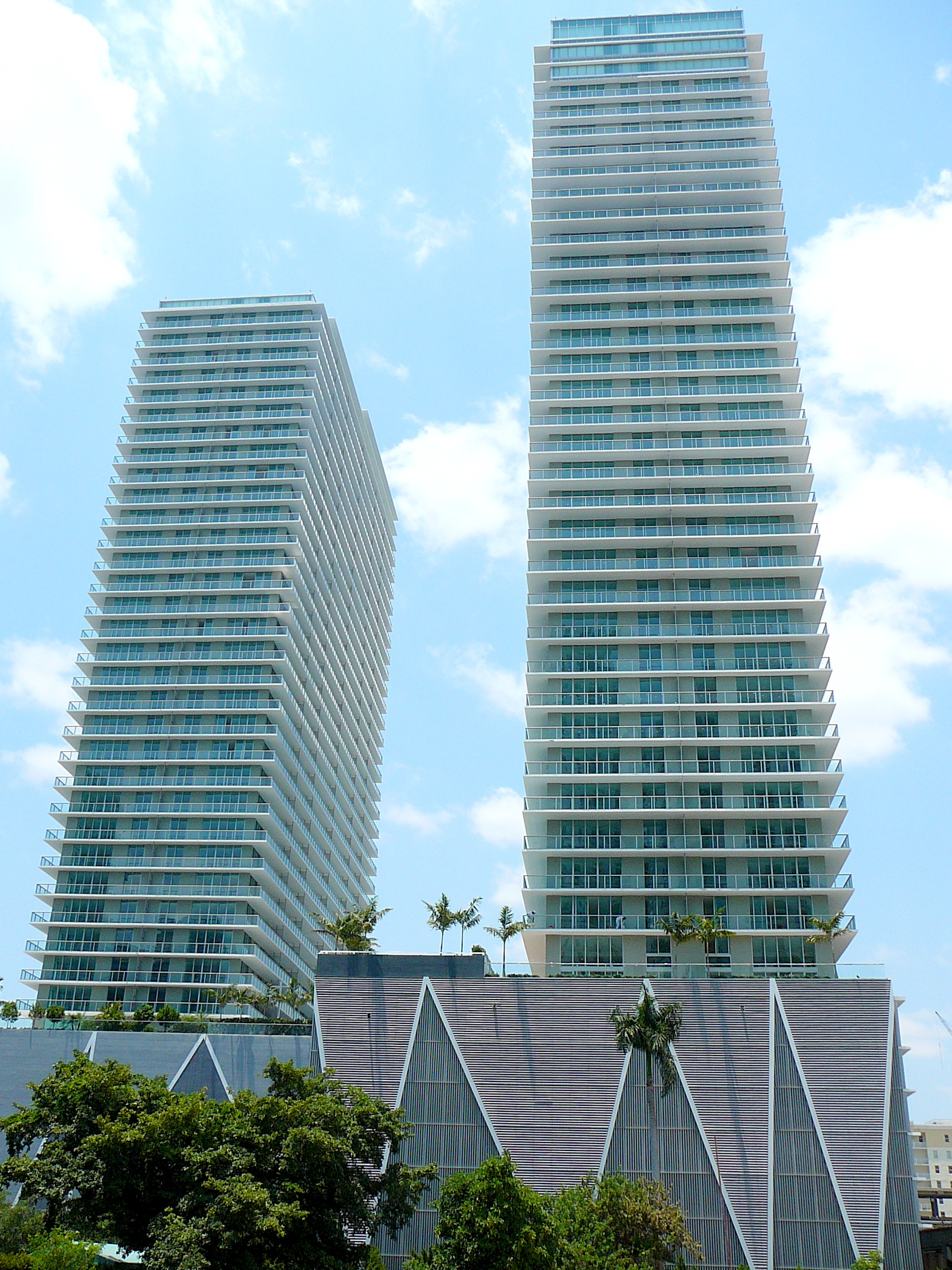
- The Axis at Brickell Village Towers in May 2008
- Interactive map of the Axis at Brickell Village North Tower area

General information
- Type: Residential
- Location: 1100 Southwest 1st Avenue, Miami, Florida, United States
- Coordinates: 25.763331°N 80.194258°W
- Construction started: 2005
- Completed: 2008
- Opening: 2008

Height
- Roof: 418 ft (127 m)

Technical details
- Floor count: 40

Design and construction
- Architect: Arquitectonica
- Developer: Brack Capital Real Estate Group

Axis at Brickell Village South Tower
- Interactive map of the Axis at Brickell Village South Tower area

General information
- Type: Residential
- Location: 79 Southwest 12th Street, Miami, Florida, United States
- Coordinates: 25.7627858°N 80.1945855°W
- Construction started: 2005
- Completed: 2008
- Opening: 2008

Height
- Roof: 418 ft (127 m)

Technical details
- Floor count: 40

Design and construction
- Architect: Arquitectonica
- Developer: Brack Capital Real Estate Group

Axis at Brickell Village is a high-rise building complex in the Brickell district of Miami, Florida. The complex, designed by the renowned Arquitectonica architecture firm, consists of two residential twin towers, Axis at Brickell Village North Tower and Axis at Brickell Village South Tower. Both towers were topped off in mid-2007, meaning that they have reached their final heights and were completed in 2008. The towers rise 418 feet (127 meters) each, with 40 floors. They are amongst the tallest buildings in Miami. The buildings are located at 1100 Southwest 1st Avenue. Axis on Brickell is located immediately adjacent to the Brickell Metrorail and Metromover station.

== See also ==
- List of tallest buildings in Miami
