= Dadeland South station =

Miami-Dade Transit metro station

●● Dadeland South
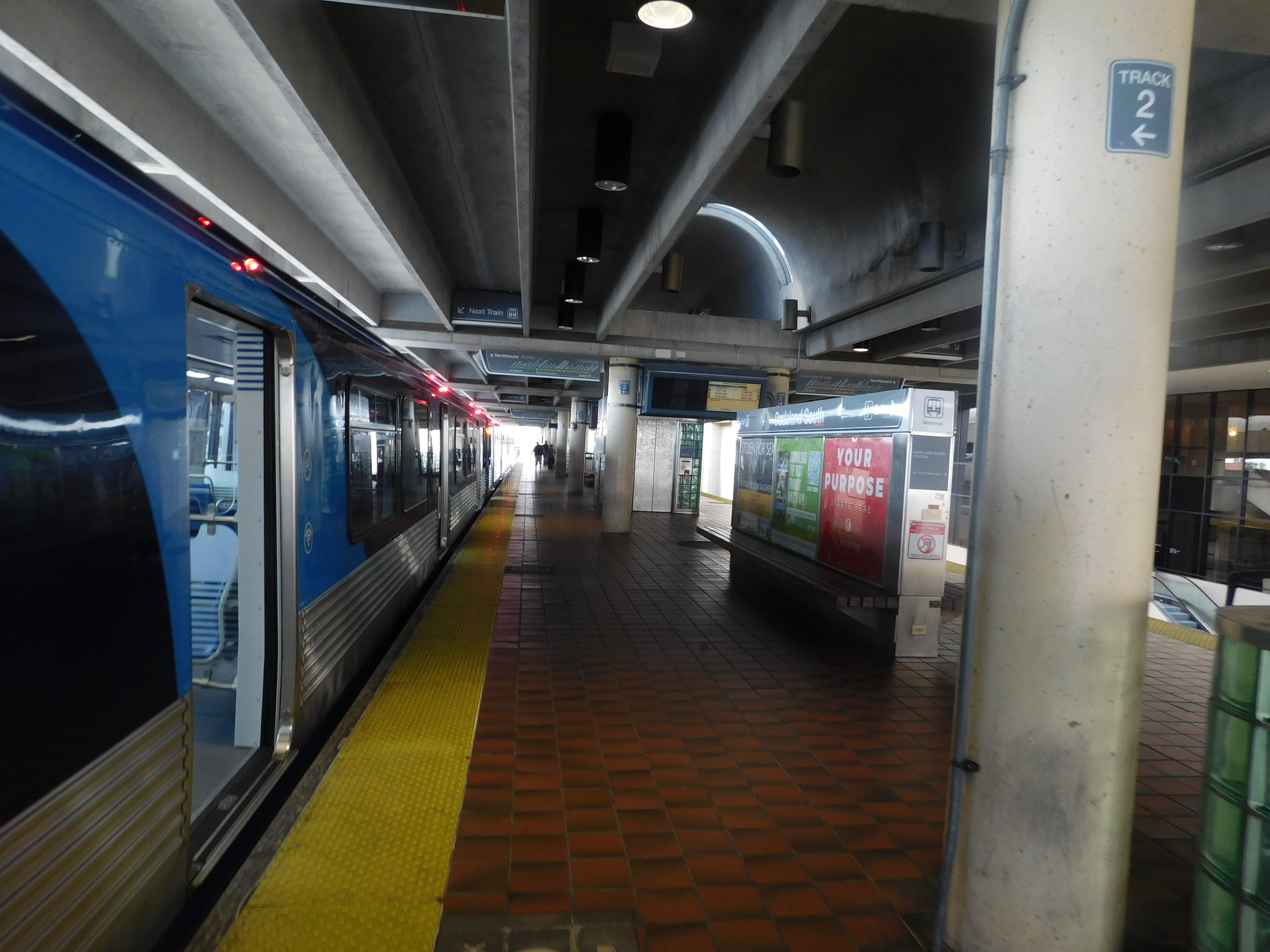
- Dadeland South station platform

General information
- Location: 9150 Dadeland Boulevard; Miami, Florida
- Coordinates: 25°41′6″N 80°18′49″W
- Owner: Miami-Dade County
- Platforms: 1 island platform
- Tracks: 2
- Connections: Metrobus: 400; South Dade TransitWay: 601, 602; Palmetto Bay IBus

Construction
- Parking: 1,274 spaces, kiss and ride
- Cycle facilities: Racks, MetroPath, South Dade Trail
- Accessible: Yes

Other information
- Station code: DLS

History
- Opened: May 20, 1984

Passengers
- 2012: 2.2 million ▲10%

Services
Preceding station	Miami-Dade Transit	Following station
Terminus	Green Line	Dadeland North toward Palmetto
Terminus	Orange Line	Dadeland North toward Miami Int'l Airport
Former services
Preceding station	Miami-Dade Transit	Following station
Terminus	Downtown Express	Dadeland North toward Government Center
Location

Dadeland South station is a transfer station on the Metrorail rapid transit system in the Dadeland district of Kendall, Florida. It is the southern terminus of the Metrorail system and the northern terminus of the South Dade TransitWay (a BRT corridor). It is the southernmost passenger rail station in the Continental United States. This station is located near the intersection of Dadeland Boulevard and Datran Boulevard, adjacent to South Dixie Highway (US 1), three blocks southwest of Kendall Drive and Dadeland Mall, and just east of the nearby southern terminus of the Palmetto Expressway (SR 826) junction. It opened to service May 20, 1984.

The station serves Downtown Dadeland as well as local shopping centers Dadeland Mall and Town Center One.

== Station layout ==
The station has two tracks served by an island platform.
