= Dadeland =

Neighborhood in Florida, United States

Coordinates: 25.6667°N 80.3567°W

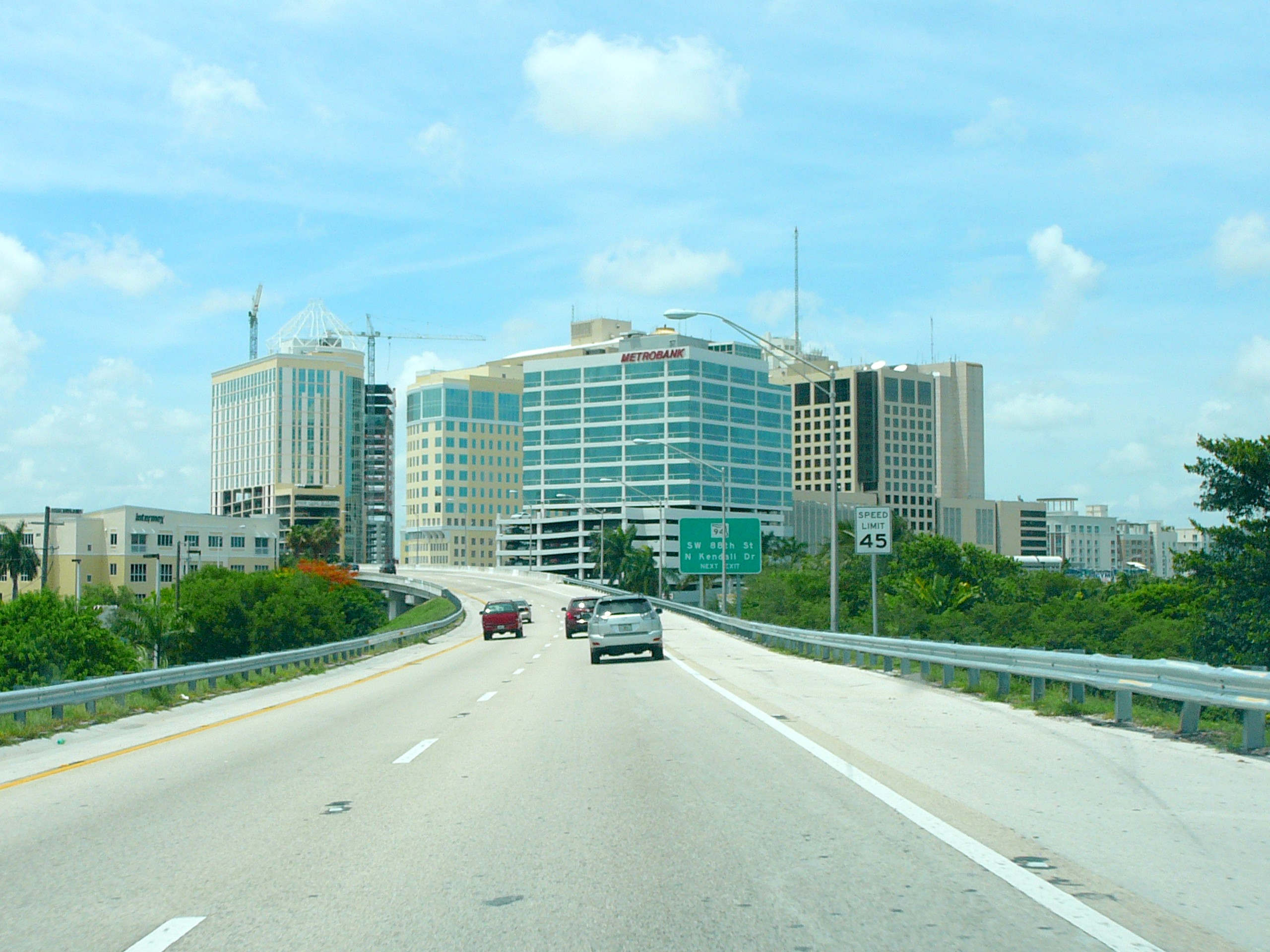
Dadeland, looking north, as seen from an entrance ramp onto the Palmetto Expressway

Dadeland is a commercial district and urban neighborhood similar to an edge city, amid the sprawling metropolitan Miami suburbs of Kendall, Glenvar Heights, and Pinecrest, in the U.S. state of Florida, at the end of the Metrorail line. Its ZIP code is 33156.

== History ==
Development in the then-desolate area began in earnest in 1960 with the completion of Palmetto Expressway (Florida 826) and Dadeland Mall, the largest shopping mall in greater Miami at the time. As Kendall became a center for urban sprawl in south Florida post-World War II, Dade County constructed two freeways in the area, Don Shula Expressway (Florida 874) and Snapper Creek Expressway (Florida 878), between 1972 and 1980.

Rapid transit service into Downtown Miami commenced with the completion of the Miami Metrorail in 1984, providing rail service to suburban commuters in southern Dade into Miami and greater South Florida's central business district. Residential and office complexes were constructed in the area in the 1990s and 2000s due to a unique zoning that allowed dense and high-rise development in the triangular area between US-1 and the Palmetto Expressway.

== Transportation ==
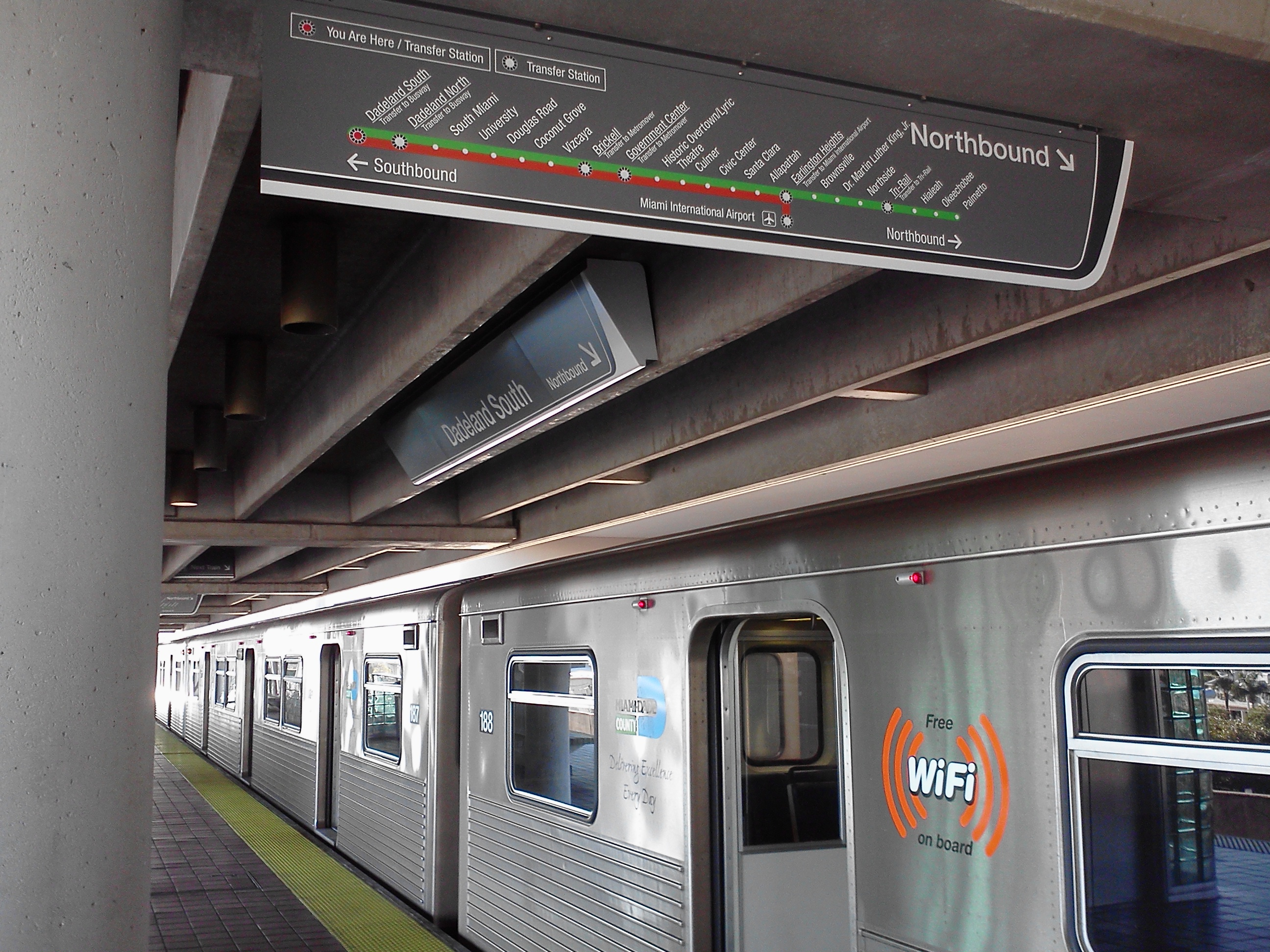
Miami Metrorail train at Dadeland South Station. Dadeland is directly served by two Metrorail stations.

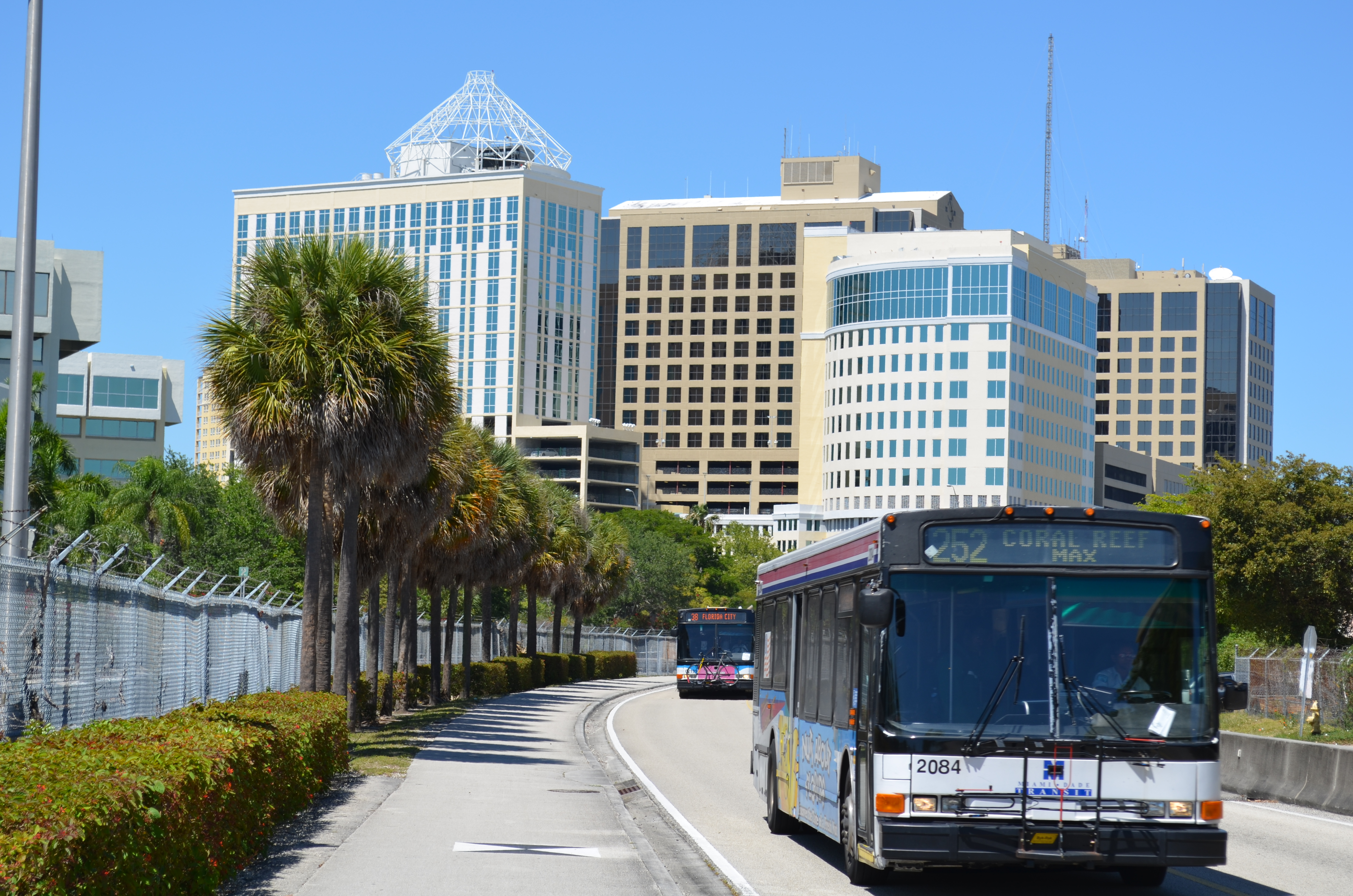
The busway begins where the Metrorail ends

Dadeland is served by the Metrorail at Dadeland North and Dadeland South stations, directly connecting one of the largest suburban communities in southern Florida with Downtown Miami and Miami International Airport. Numerous Metrobus lines terminate at the Dadeland South station, with connections to Homestead and Florida City via the South Miami-Dade Busway.

Metrorail:

- Dadeland North (SW 70th Avenue and U.S. 1)
- Dadeland South (Dadeland Boulevard and U.S. 1)

== Economy ==
Pollo Tropical has its headquarters in Dadeland. The headquarters had moved there in 1994.

== Education and institutions ==
=== Elementary schools ===
Miami-Dade County Public Schools operates area public schools:

- Kenwood Elementary School

=== Private schools ===
- Gulliver Preparatory School
- Temple Beth AM Day School
- Cattoira Montessori School

== Points of interest ==
- Dadeland Mall
- Downtown Dadeland
- Dadeland Station
- Kendall, FL
- Glenvar Heights, FL
- Pinecrest, FL
- Metropolis at Dadeland
