= Dadeland Mall =

Shopping mall in Kendall, Florida

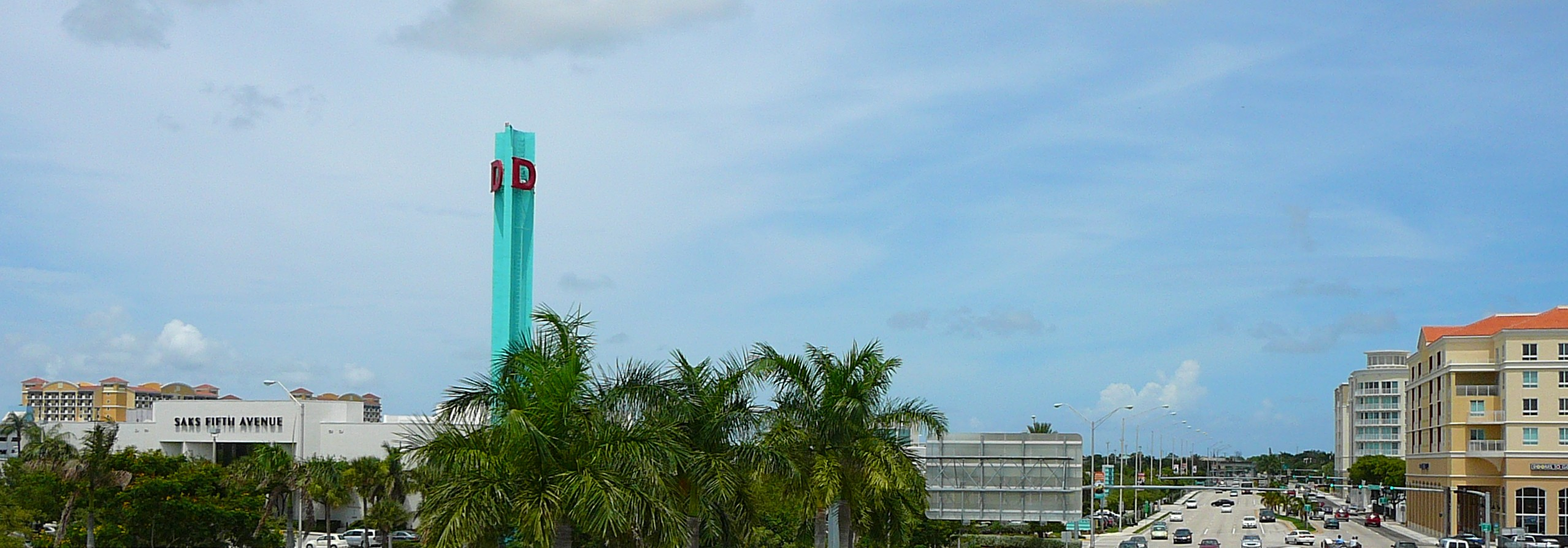
- Partial view of the mall, as seen from the Palmetto Expressway. The original landmark tower with the letter 'D' is still present.
- Location: Kendall, Florida
- Coordinates: 25°41′25″N 80°18′43″W
- Address: 7535 North Kendall Drive
- Opened: October 1, 1962; 64 years ago
- Developer: Joseph Meyerhoff
- Manager: Simon Property Group
- Owner: Simon Property Group (50%); Morgan Stanley (50%)
- Num. of stores: 167
- Num. of anchor tenants: 6
- Floor area: 1,498,485 sq ft (139,213.8 m^{2})
- Floors: 1 with partial upper level (2 in JCPenney, Saks Fifth Avenue, and Urban Outfitters, 3 in both Macy's locations)
- Website: www.simon.com/mall/dadeland-mall

Dadeland Mall is a large enclosed shopping mall located in Kendall, Florida, in the Dadeland district. The mall, originally developed by the Joseph Meyerhoff Company of Baltimore, opened October 1, 1962 as a 535,000-square-foot (49,700 m^{2}), open-air complex of 60 stores and services. Today the mall is about triple that size, with about 1,500,000 square feet (140,000 m^{2}) of retail space. The mall features JCPenney, Macy's, Macy's Home Gallery and Kids, Dick’s House of Sport and Saks Fifth Avenue. The Dadeland North station is adjacent to the mall, and the Dadeland South station is located just south of the mall.

== History ==
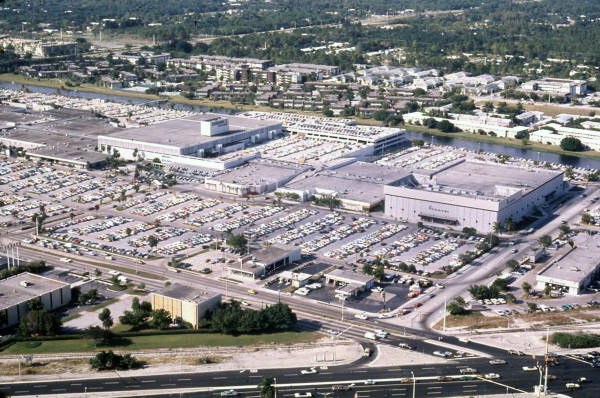
Aerial view looking northwest over the Dadeland Mall (circa 1969)

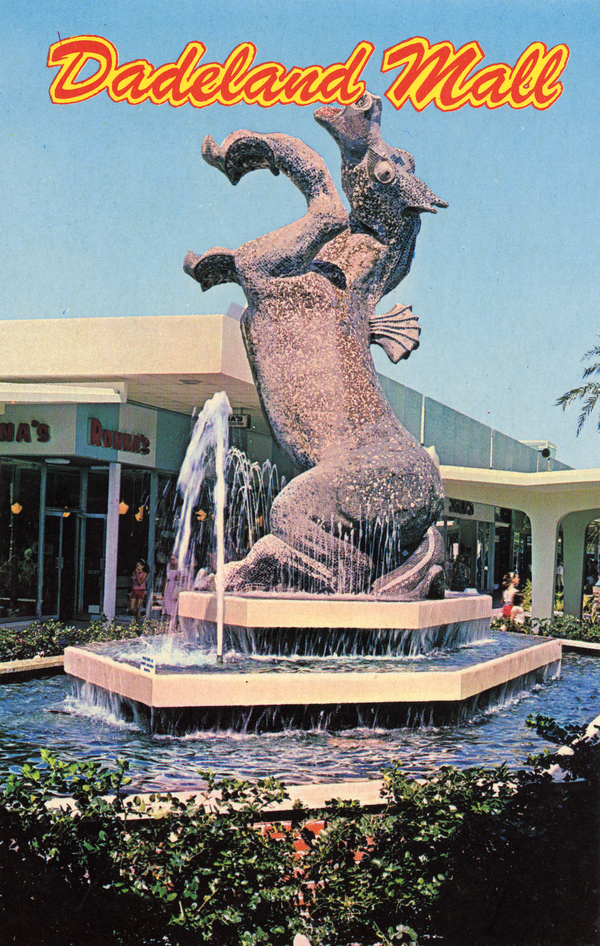
Fountain at the Dadeland Mall (circa 1969)

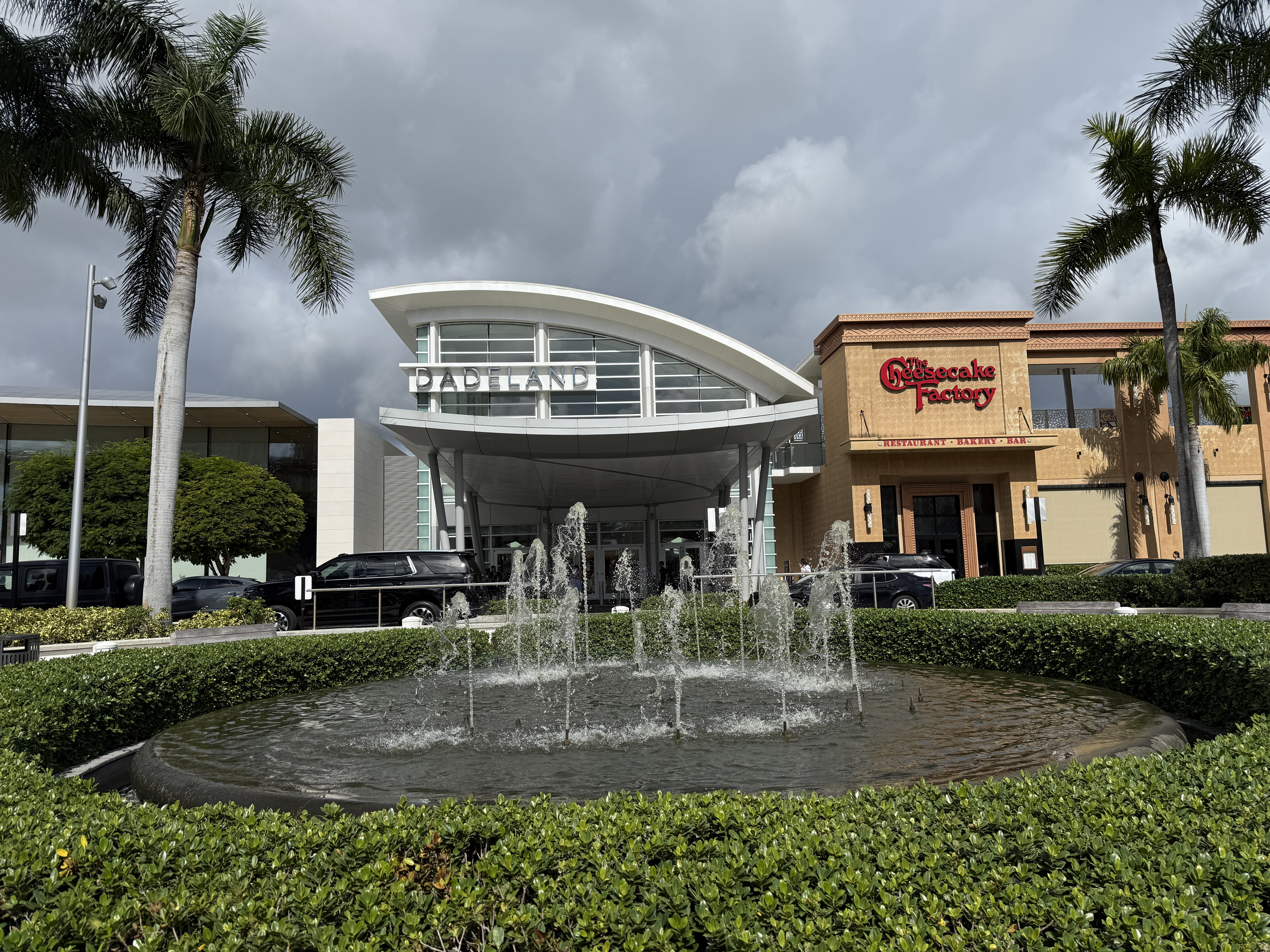
South entrance to Dadeland Mall

Originally an open-air center, the mall was anchored by Burdine's (spelled with an apostrophe at the time), and also boasted a Food Fair grocery, a Thom McAn shoe store, a full-service Gray Drug and the Summit Restaurant, Lounge and Cafeteria (later known as The Forum). A Jordan Marsh anchor store was added to the west end, which opened in November 1966.

A major construction project, started in late 1969, doubled the size of the mall by creating a twin structure (leaving the large Burdine's in the center) and adding a fully enclosed retail wing to the east end. Additionally, the existing courts and concourses were completely enclosed and air-conditioned. Another feature of this expansion was the King of the Mall, an enormous Burger King (whose corporate headquarters were then located across from Dadeland on North Kendall Drive). This renovation project was completed with the opening of JCPenney, the mall's new east anchor store, in early 1971.

A 1979 drug-related shooting spree at the mall began the Miami drug war. In broad daylight, two gunmen exited a paneled truck, entered a liquor store and gunned down two men, wounding the store clerk. The dead men were eventually identified as a Colombia-based cocaine trafficker and his bodyguard.

On December 3, 1981, a 13-month-old boy was found alive behind the mall, after having gone missing four days earlier, around three miles away. His parents, Alfonso Jesus Arrubla, a former M-19 guerrilla turned drug dealer and his wife María Eugenia Delgado were shot in the head along with four others at their Southwest Dade townhouse.

A third expansion, undertaken in early 1983, added Saks Fifth Avenue and Lord & Taylor to the south-facing front of the complex. A food court had also opened, in the shuttered Pantry Pride (former Food Fair) supermarket, in late 1983.

From 1984 to 1987, a massive renovation project, orchestrated by architect Dick Johnson, had the aging animal statues and drop ceiling removed. Considered a new approach at the time, it modernized the entire mall.

The seahorse statue was deliberately cut in half during a renovation and placed into storage. It was unable to be reassembled and scrapped.

The other modern smooth colored concrete animals and geometric slides were donated to Miami-Dade County and can be seen in Dante Fascell Park in South Miami and at the Miami-Dade County children's day care center play yard to the east of Jackson Memorial Hospital. In 2004 Lord & Taylor repositioned and shuttered their location entirely. It became Nordstrom that same year.

One of the unique trademarks of the shopping complex is the concrete tower with a giant "D" (for Dadeland) at the top. This local landmark was there from the beginning.

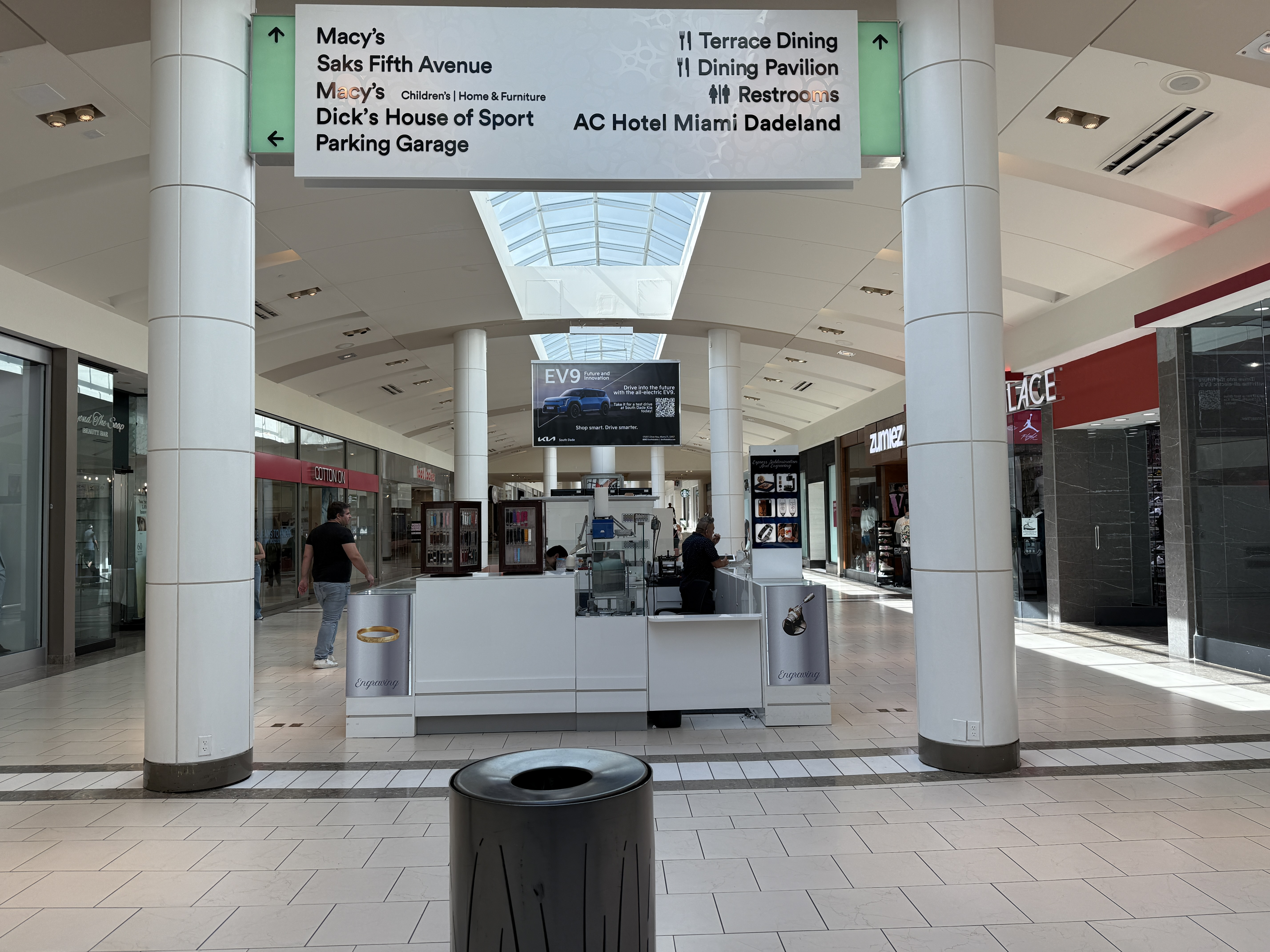
Dadeland Mall from JCPenney

Today, Dadeland is managed by the Indianapolis-based Simon Property Group, who purchased 50% of the center in 1997. Morgan Stanley owns the other 50%. The anchors include Florida's largest Macy's (Macy's Florida's flagship store), as well as Macy's Home Gallery & Kids (the west end anchor), JCPenney, Dick’s House of Sport, and Saks Fifth Avenue. Former tenants of the west end anchor space, currently occupied by the Macy's Home Gallery & Kids, were Jordan Marsh (1966–1991) and Burdines Home Store (1993–2005), which was eventually to be taken over by Mervyns with Dillard's as another bidder, but these stores didn't take over the space. Former tenants of the southeast end anchor space were Lord & Taylor (1983–2004) and Nordstrom (2004–2020).

Dadeland Mall's largest restaurant is The Cheesecake Factory.

The outer part of the mall, particularly the original main entrance, was featured in the 1985 Chuck Norris film Invasion U.S.A. The inside and outside of the mall was featured in the 1990 Alec Baldwin film Miami Blues. The mall has been remodeled since both of those films however. In the late 1990s, talks were underway about adding a second floor to the entire mall. This project would have doubled the mall's space plus add second-floor access to the anchor stores all of which already have second floors. This project was rejected.

On May 7, 2020, Nordstrom announced the closure of their anchor store, due to the economic impact of the COVID-19 pandemic.

On October 13, 2021, the AC Hotel Miami Dadeland opened to guests.

Dick's Sporting Goods purchased the former Nordstrom building to build one of their large format Dick’s House of Sport stores, which opened in February 2025.

== Location ==
Dadeland Mall is located between South Dixie Highway (US-1) and the Palmetto Expressway (SR 826) at its southern terminus where it meets US-1. It is also served by the Dadeland North Metrorail station, which has a pedestrian walkway connecting to the mall.
