= Kendall, Florida =

- Census-designated place
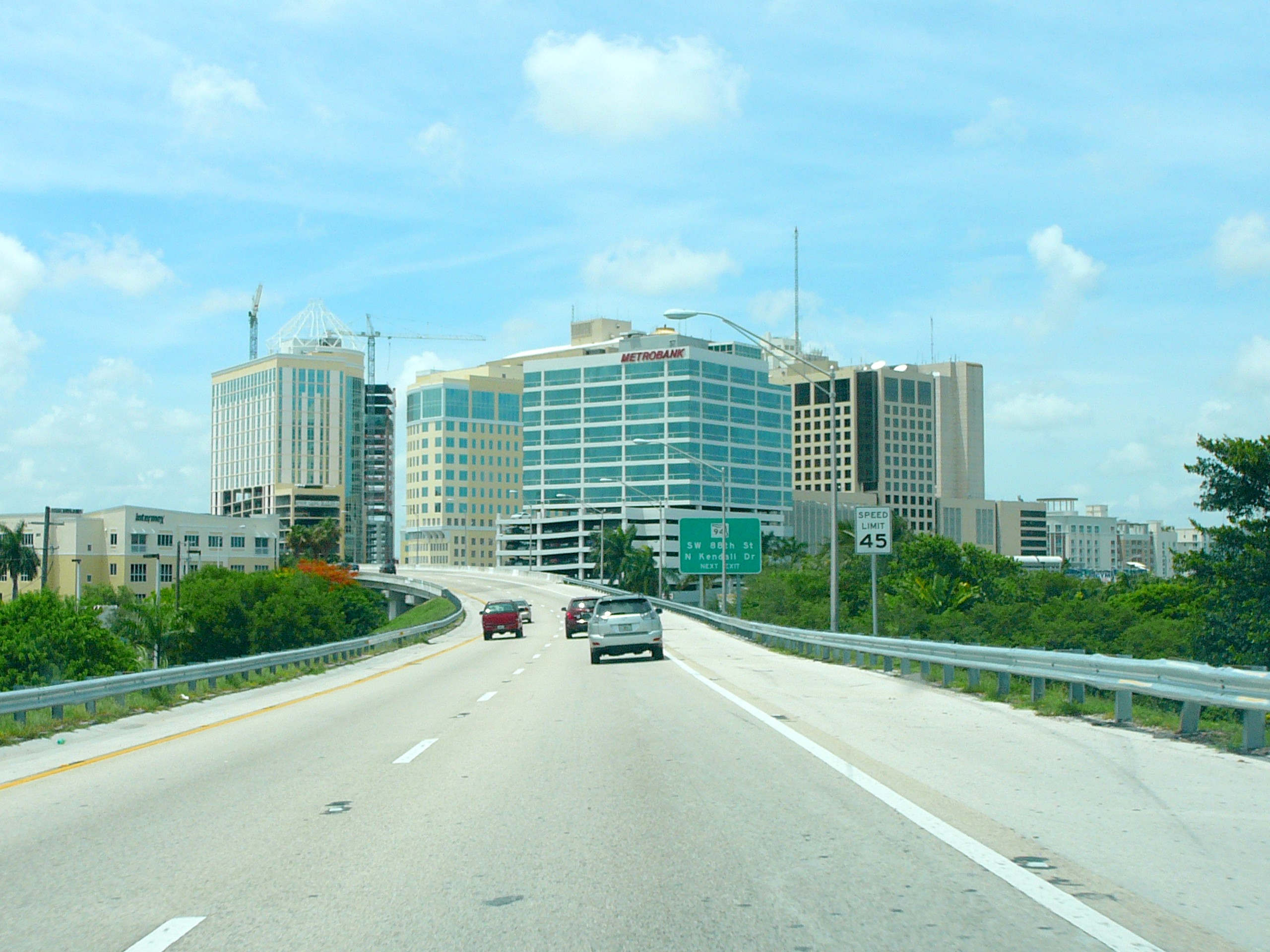
- Dadeland forms the business area of Kendall.

- Location in Miami-Dade County and the state of Florida

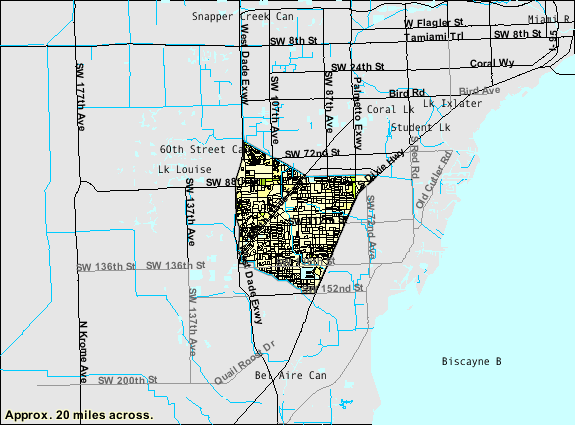
- U.S. Census Bureau map of Kendall showing boundaries
- Coordinates: 25°40′26″N 80°22′24″W
- Country: United States
- State: Florida
- County: Miami-Dade

Government
  - Governing body: Miami-Dade County
  - Mayor: Daniella Levine Cava

Area
  - Total: 16.60 sq mi (43.00 km^{2})
  - Land: 16.10 sq mi (41.70 km^{2})
  - Water: 0.50 sq mi (1.30 km^{2})
- Elevation: 7 ft (2.1 m)

Population (2020)
  - Total: 80,241
  - Density: 4,984.22/sq mi (1,924.42/km^{2})
- Time zone: UTC−5 (Eastern (EST))
  - Summer (DST): UTC−4 (EDT)
- ZIP Codes: 33156, 33173, 33176, 33183, 33186 (Miami)
- Area codes: 305, 786, 645
- FIPS code: 12-36100
- GNIS feature ID: 2403168

Kendall is an unincorporated area and census-designated place in Miami-Dade County, Florida, United States. It is a principal city in the Miami metropolitan area. At the 2020 census, the area had a population of 80,241.

== History ==
Much of what is now Kendall was purchased from the State of Florida in 1883 by the Florida Land and Mortgage Company. It was named for Henry John Broughton Kendall, a director of the company, who moved to the area in the 1900s to manage the company's land. As the land was not open to homesteading, development was slow well into the 20th century. A post office opened in 1914, and the first school opened in 1929. After the end of the land boom in 1926, some residents left. Two Seminole camps were in the Kendall area, and Seminoles continued to live there into the 1940s.

Prior to the 1950s, the term "Kendall" was used to describe a region centered around U.S. Route 1, bounded by Snapper Creek to the north, the Everglades to the west, Old Cutler Road to the east, and the former community of Rockdale to the south. This area was largely uninhabited, generally consisting of pine rockland interspersed with fields and groves. As the region experienced rapid development in the 1950s, the moniker "Kendall" came to refer to the various communities built in the vicinity of present-day Pinecrest and the eastern half of the current Kendall CDP. When growth shifted west in the 1970s, 1980s, and 1990s, the usage of the term steadily shifted west concurrently, and today it is most often applied to the area more formally known as West Kendall. Prior to incorporation in 1996, the Village of Pinecrest was still included in the official boundaries of Kendall CDP.

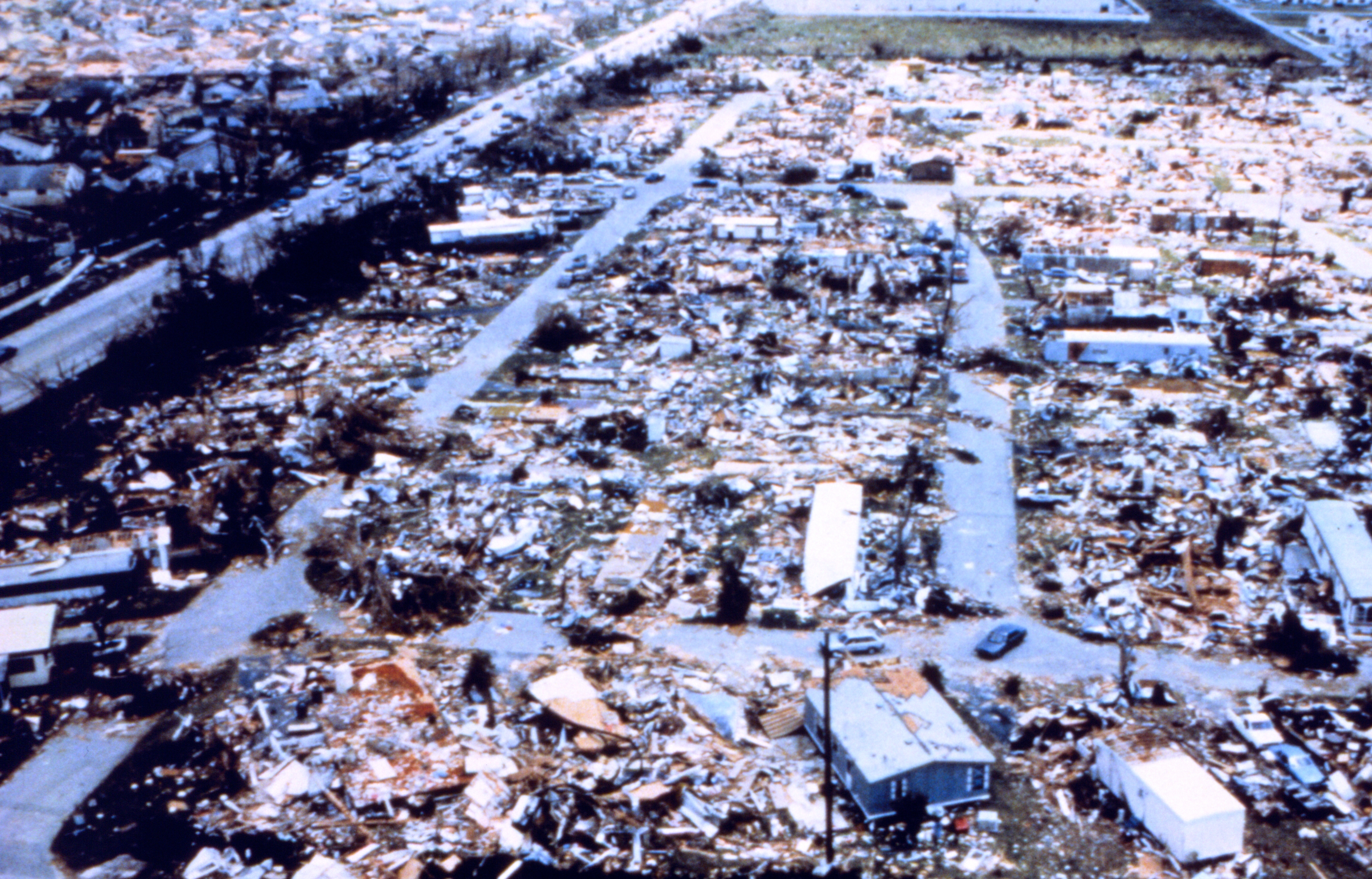
Dadeland Mobile Home Park neighborhood near Kendall destroyed by Hurricane Andrew in 1992.

In August 1992, Kendall and the surrounding South Dade area were severely damaged by Hurricane Andrew. Many of the homes and businesses in the area were destroyed. In the subsequent years, the area was slowly rebuilt.

== Geography ==
Kendall is located 14 miles (23 km) southwest of downtown Miami. It is bordered to the east by the village of Pinecrest, to the southeast by the village of Palmetto Bay, to the south by Palmetto Estates and Richmond Heights, to the southwest by Three Lakes, to the west by The Crossings, to the northwest by Kendale Lakes, to the north by Sunset, and to the northeast by Glenvar Heights.

U.S. Route 1 forms the eastern boundary of Kendall; it leads northeast to Miami and southwest 16 miles (26 km) to Homestead. The Homestead Extension of Florida's Turnpike forms the western boundary of Kendall, leading north 10 miles (16 km) to Doral and south 18 miles (29 km) to its southern terminus at Florida City. The Don Shula Expressway (Florida State Road 874) crosses Kendall from northeast to southwest.

According to the United States Census Bureau, the Kendall CDP has a total area of 16.6 square miles (43 km^{2}); 16.1 square miles (42 km^{2}) of it are land and 0.5 square miles (1.3 km^{2}) of it (3.03%) are water.

=== Climate ===
Kendall has a tropical monsoon climate (Am) which is similar to the remainder of Miami-Dade County, although its inland location does make it cooler at night and warmer during the day compared to coastal areas such as Miami Beach.

Climate data for Kendall, Florida (Miami Executive Airport), 1991–2020 normals, extremes 1998–present
Month	Jan	Feb	Mar	Apr	May	Jun	Jul	Aug	Sep	Oct	Nov	Dec	Year
Record high °F (°C)	88 (31)	91 (33)	92 (33)	97 (36)	97 (36)	98 (37)	99 (37)	99 (37)	95 (35)	96 (36)	92 (33)	89 (32)	99 (37)
Mean maximum °F (°C)	84.9 (29.4)	87.3 (30.7)	90.0 (32.2)	92.2 (33.4)	94.4 (34.7)	95.2 (35.1)	94.9 (34.9)	95.7 (35.4)	93.9 (34.4)	92.1 (33.4)	87.5 (30.8)	85.2 (29.6)	96.7 (35.9)
Mean daily maximum °F (°C)	76.9 (24.9)	79.6 (26.4)	81.9 (27.7)	85.1 (29.5)	88.2 (31.2)	90.3 (32.4)	91.2 (32.9)	91.7 (33.2)	89.8 (32.1)	87.0 (30.6)	81.9 (27.7)	78.8 (26.0)	85.2 (29.6)
Daily mean °F (°C)	66.9 (19.4)	69.1 (20.6)	71.5 (21.9)	75.0 (23.9)	78.9 (26.1)	82.1 (27.8)	83.1 (28.4)	83.6 (28.7)	82.3 (27.9)	79.2 (26.2)	73.1 (22.8)	69.4 (20.8)	76.2 (24.6)
Mean daily minimum °F (°C)	56.8 (13.8)	58.6 (14.8)	61.1 (16.2)	64.9 (18.3)	69.5 (20.8)	74.0 (23.3)	74.9 (23.8)	75.4 (24.1)	74.7 (23.7)	71.3 (21.8)	64.3 (17.9)	60.0 (15.6)	67.1 (19.5)
Mean minimum °F (°C)	40.0 (4.4)	44.6 (7.0)	47.1 (8.4)	54.4 (12.4)	61.7 (16.5)	69.9 (21.1)	71.5 (21.9)	72.5 (22.5)	70.6 (21.4)	62.3 (16.8)	51.4 (10.8)	46.8 (8.2)	37.4 (3.0)
Record low °F (°C)	30 (−1)	32 (0)	35 (2)	44 (7)	53 (12)	66 (19)	68 (20)	69 (21)	67 (19)	52 (11)	38 (3)	31 (−1)	30 (−1)
Average precipitation inches (mm)	1.74 (44)	1.96 (50)	2.03 (52)	2.86 (73)	5.16 (131)	8.82 (224)	7.19 (183)	8.28 (210)	8.42 (214)	5.25 (133)	2.09 (53)	2.28 (58)	56.08 (1,424)
Average precipitation days (≥ 0.01 in)	9.4	8.0	7.3	7.4	11.2	18.7	18.9	18.1	18.0	12.6	8.9	10.1	148.6
Source: NOAA (mean maxima/minima 2006–2020)

== Demographics ==
Historical population
Census	Pop.	Note	%±
1970	35,497		—
1980	73,758		107.8%
1990	87,271		18.3%
2000	75,226		−13.8%
2010	75,371		0.2%
2020	80,241		6.5%

=== Racial and ethnic composition ===
Kendall CDP, Florida – Racial and ethnic composition Note: the US Census treats Hispanic/Latino as an ethnic category. This table excludes Latinos from the racial categories and assigns them to a separate category. Hispanics/Latinos may be of any race.
Race / Ethnicity (NH = Non-Hispanic)	Pop 2010	Pop 2020	% 2010	% 2020
White (NH)	21,432	16,781	28.44%	20.91%
Black or African American (NH)	2,680	2,339	3.56%	2.91%
Native American or Alaska Native (NH)	37	31	0.05%	0.04%
Asian (NH)	2,190	2,087	2.91%	2.60%
Pacific Islander or Native Hawaiian (NH)	24	13	0.03%	0.02%
Some other race (NH)	232	369	0.31%	0.46%
Mixed race or Multiracial (NH)	738	1,558	0.98%	1.94%
Hispanic or Latino (any race)	48,038	57,063	63.74%	71.11%
Total	75,371	80,241	100.00%	100.00%

=== 2020 census ===
As of the 2020 census, Kendall had a population of 80,241. The median age was 44.3 years. 17.6% of residents were under the age of 18 and 20.9% of residents were 65 years of age or older. For every 100 females there were 85.5 males, and for every 100 females age 18 and over there were 81.4 males age 18 and over.

100.0% of residents lived in urban areas, while 0.0% lived in rural areas.

There were 31,499 households in Kendall, of which 28.3% had children under the age of 18 living in them. Of all households, 46.1% were married-couple households, 15.3% were households with a male householder and no spouse or partner present, and 31.6% were households with a female householder and no spouse or partner present. About 25.6% of all households were made up of individuals and 12.4% had someone living alone who was 65 years of age or older.

There were 19,077 families residing in the CDP.

There were 33,350 housing units, of which 5.6% were vacant. The homeowner vacancy rate was 0.8% and the rental vacancy rate was 7.3%.

Racial composition as of the 2020 census
Race	Number	Percent
White	30,572	38.1%
Black or African American	2,548	3.2%
American Indian and Alaska Native	149	0.2%
Asian	2,183	2.7%
Native Hawaiian and Other Pacific Islander	20	0.0%
Some other race	6,865	8.6%
Two or more races	37,904	47.2%
Hispanic or Latino (of any race)	57,063	71.1%

=== 2010 census ===
As of the 2010 United States census, there were 75,371 people, 27,287 households, and 18,812 families residing in the CDP.

=== 2000 census ===
In 2000, 33.4% households had children under the age of 18 living with them, 51.0% were married couples living together, 13.8% had a female householder with no husband present, and 31.0% were non-families. 24.4% of all households were made up of individuals, and 7.3% had someone living alone who was 65 years of age or older. The average household size was 2.61 and the average family size was 3.14.

In 2000, 23.3% of the population were under the age of 18, 8.6% from 18 to 24, 31.8% from 25 to 44, 24.9% from 45 to 64, and 11.5% who were 65 years of age or older. The median age was 37 years. For every 100 females, there were 88.5 males. For every 100 females age 18 and over, there were 83.4 males.

In 2000, the median household income was $51,330 and the median family income was $61,241. Males had a median income of $42,875 and females $31,416. The per capita income was $27,914. About 5.7% of families and 8.6% of the population were below the poverty line, including 8.0% of those under age 18 and 10.9% of those age 65 or over.

In 2000, 52.46% of residents spoke Spanish at home, while those who spoke only English comprised 40.38%. Speakers of Portuguese were 1.49% of the population, French 1.12%, and French Creole 0.95%.

== Transportation ==
Kendall is served by Metrobus throughout the area, and by the Metrorail at:

- Dadeland North (SW 70th Avenue and U.S. 1)
- Dadeland South (Dadeland Boulevard and U.S. 1)

Both stations provide metro service from Dadeland to nearby commercial centers like the city of Coral Gables, Downtown Miami, and Miami International Airport. Dadeland South station is a major transit depot in the area, connecting the southernmost cities of Homestead and Florida City to Metrorail via limited-stop bus rapid transit along the South Miami-Dade Busway.

== Economy ==
Pollo Tropical has its headquarters in Dadeland, Kendall. The headquarters moved to Dadeland in 1994.

Kendall is the site of Dadeland Mall, an upscale indoor shopping mall in East Kendall with Macy's, Saks Fifth Avenue and JCPenney as anchor stores. In South Kendall, directly south of Dadeland Mall on US-1 is The Falls (mall), an open-air shopping mall with Macy's as anchor store as well as a Regal Cinema.

Prior to its dissolution, Air Florida was headquartered in the Dade Towers in what is now the Kendall CDP.

== Government and infrastructure ==
The Miami-Dade Police Department operates the Kendall District Station in the CDP.

== Notable people ==
- Hank Kaplan, boxing historian
- Janet Reno, 78th U.S. Attorney General
- O. J. Simpson, American football player

== Education ==
=== Primary, middle and secondary schools ===
==== Public schools ====
The first public school in Kendall was Kendall School, now renamed Kenwood K-8 Center. Kenwood is the site of the Kenwoods Hammock, a native forest planting which has become a world-renowned stop for bird watchers.

Miami-Dade County Public Schools serves Kendall.

===== Kindergarten - 12th grade =====
- Instructional Center System Wide
- Ruth Owen Kruse Education Center

===== High schools =====
- Miami Southwest Senior High School
- Miami Killian High School is in the CDP.
- Miami Palmetto High School in Pinecrest serves a portion of the CDP.
- School for Advanced Studies (Kendall campus)
- Miami Sunset Senior High School
- Felix Varela Senior High School

===== Middle schools =====
- Glades Middle School (Miami)
- Archimedean Middle Conservatory (charter)
- Miami MacArthur South
- Pinecrest Academy (North Campus) (charter)
- Howard D. McMillan Middle School
- Arvida Middle School

===== Elementary schools =====
- Blue Lakes Elementary School
- Academir Charter School West
- Archimedean Academy (charter)
- Bowman Foster Ashe Elementary School
- Calusa Elementary School
- Christina M. Eve Elementary School
- Claude Pepper Elementary School
- Dante B. Fascell Elementary School
- Devon Aire K–8 Center
- Kendale Elementary
- Kendale Lakes Elementary
- Kenwood Elementary
- Leewood Elementary School
- Oliver Hoover Elementary School
- Santa Fe Advantage Academy (charter)
- Sunset Park Elementary School
- Vineland K–8 Center
- Winston Park K–8 Center
- William H. Lehman Elementary

==== Private schools ====
- Atlantis Academy (K–12)
- Calusa Preparatory School
- Cattoira Montessori School (PK–5)
- Children's Resources (PK–2)
- Florida Christian School
- Gateway Christian School
- Greenfield Day School (K–8)
- Islamic School of Miami
- Kendall Christian School (PK–5)
- Killian Oaks Academy
- La Scuola (PK–3)
- Learning Links Schoolhouse (K–5)
- St. Catherine of Siena Catholic School (of the Roman Catholic Archdiocese of Miami)
- St. John Neuman School (PK–8) - Established in 1981.
- Westminster Christian School
- Westwood Christian School

=== Colleges and universities ===
- College of Business and Technology (Kendall Campus)
- Kaplan University (Support Center)
- Keiser University (Kendall Campus)
- Miami-Dade College (Kendall Campus)
- Nova Southeastern University (Miami Student Educational Center)
- Polleo Institute (Tertiary education)

=== Supplementary schools ===
Miami Hoshuko, a weekend school for Japanese citizens, previously held classes at the Kendall United Methodist Church, now in Pinecrest but formerly in the Kendall CDP as of 1990.

== Media ==
Kendall is served by the Miami market for local radio and television. Kendall has its own newspaper, The Kendall Gazette, which is published twice monthly and is part of Miami Community Newspapers.
