= Galloway Road =

State highway in Miami-Dade County, Florida, United States

Galloway Road
- State Road 973; West 87th Avenue
- SR 973 highlighted in red

Route information
- Maintained by FDOT
- Length: 9.505 mi (15.297 km) Galloway Road extends 21.0 miles (33.8 km) total

Major junctions
- South end: US 1 in Kendall
- SR 878 in Glenvar Heights; US 41 in Westchester; SR 836 / SR 826 in Fontainebleau
- North end: Northwest 12th Street in Doral

Location
- Country: United States
- State: Florida
- Counties: Miami-Dade

Highway system
- Florida State Highway System; Interstate; US; State; Former; Pre‑1945; Toll; Scenic
← SR 972	→ SR 975

Galloway Road, also known as West 87th Avenue, is a north–south route through the western areas of suburban Miami-Dade County, Florida, from the Black Point area south of Cutler Bay almost to the Broward County line north of Miami Lakes. It exists in seven different unconnected segments that total 27.5 miles (44.3 km) in length, acting as connecting roads, neighborhood streets, and arterial routes. Approximately 9.5 miles (15.3 km) of Galloway Road, between Pinecrest and Doral, is designated as State Road 973.

== Route description ==
=== Southern sections ===
Galloway Road, or locally Southwest 87th Avenue (south of Flagler Street), begins at a dead-end across the Black Creek Canal from the Black Point Marina, next to Biscayne National Park, just over a mile south of the town of Cutler Bay in unincorporated Miami-Dade county. After following the canal northwest as a two-laned road for about half a mile, Southwest 87th Avenue turns north and takes on this alignment until the northern reaches of Kendall. As it continues north through undeveloped mangrove forest, Galloway Road parallels a drainage canal to its left, with both the road and canal crossing into Cutler Bay at Southwest 232nd Street. Galloway Road reaches suburbia by Southwest 216th Street, still with the canal beside it as it travels north, passing by schools, gated condominium communities and the backs of residential neighborhoods. A small leftwards chicane on Southwest 87th Avenue marks the northern end of the canal, with the road soon crossing Old Cutler Road and entering older residential neighborhoods on the other side. Although houses now have frontage onto Galloway Road, the road retains an open feel as it passes by retirement communities and a nature preserve. More houses line Galloway Road as it continues north, crossing into the village of Palmetto Bay at Eureka Drive (Southwest 184th Street). The village retains the same residential character as Galloway Road continues north to a roundabout at Richmond Drive (Southwest 168th Street). North of here, Galloway Road continues for one block where its southernmost section terminates at a T-intersection, with the bulk of traffic encouraged to turn left and travel westward along Southwest 164th Street.

On the other side of Canal C-100 from the previous T-intersection, Galloway Road/Southwest 87th Avenue resumes at Southwest 163rd Terrace on the same alignment as a two-laned residential road. As it nears Southwest 144th Street, Galloway Road passes a medical centre and then, as it continues north, it becomes a residential street, losing its centre-line markings. It becomes little more than a laneway north of Southwest 141st Street, providing rear access to a condominium community, and terminates at another canal.

Southwest 87th Avenue resumes on the same alignment as a two-laned street approximately 700 yards (640 m) to the north in south-eastern Kendall, on the other side of a shopping mall from the South Dixie Highway (US 1) and the South Miami-Dade Busway at Southwest 134th Street, travelling two blocks north to Southwest 132nd Street where it gains the State Road 973 designation.

=== State Road 973 section ===
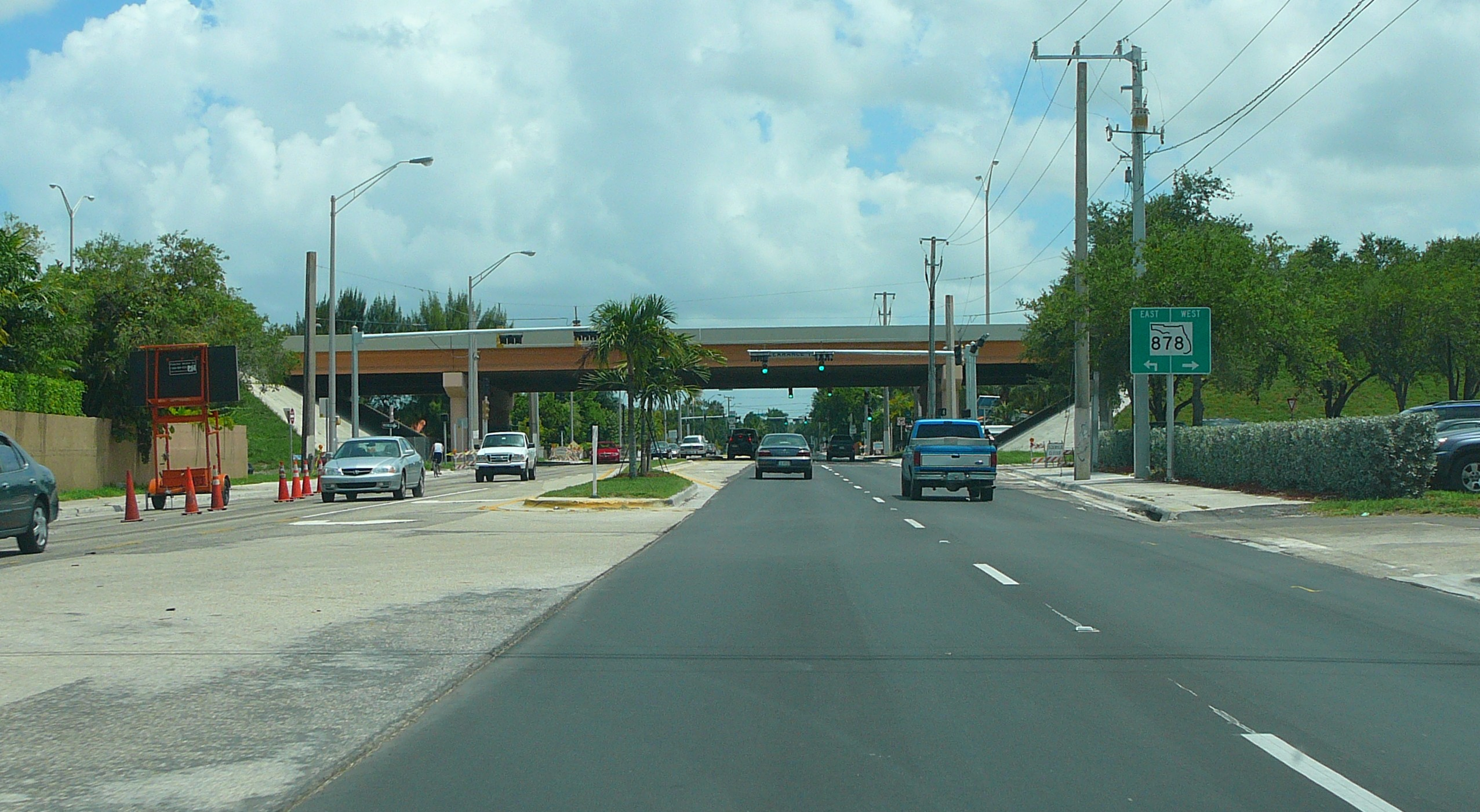
SR 973 southbound just south of Sunset Drive and north of the Snapper Creek Expressway (overhead), July 2008

For the most part, State Road 973 follows Galloway Road/Southwest 87th Avenue north from the south-western end of the Pinecrest–Kendall boundary to the State Road's terminus in Doral; however, as Galloway Road has no direct access to US 1, SR 973 begins at the intersection of US 1 and Southwest 132nd Street and travels northwest 190 yards (170 m) to Galloway Road, crossing the Busway in the process. Here, properly now in Kendall, the four-laned State Road becomes divided by a median turn lane as it turns north at the intersection and travels past light industry, dropping back to a two-laned road on the northern side of Southwest 128th Street where it enters residential neighborhoods. After crossing Southwest 112th Street (SR 990) a mile (1.6 km) later, SR 973 continues north past more houses for another 1.2 miles (1.9 km) until it crosses Southwest 94th Street, where it passes by a mixture of condominiums and medical service buildings near the Baptist Hospital of Miami. In this neighborhood, Galloway Road chicanes to the right and immediately meets Kendall Drive (SR 94), expanding to a four-laned divided road and taking on its ultimate alignment.

North of SR 94, Galloway Road passes by more houses and crosses the Snapper Creek Canal, leaving Kendall and forming the boundary between Sunset and Glenvar Heights, which lie to the west and east of SR 973 respectively. A few blocks of houses later, Galloway Road interchanges with the overhead Snapper Creek Expressway (SR 878). SR 973 continues for another half-mile (0.8 km) north past a mixture of commercial and residential uses, intersects with Sunset Drive (SR 986), then continues through more of the same for another 0.35 miles (0.56 km) until it passes under the Don Shula Expressway, crossing a CSX railroad between the two flyover bridges. There is no interchange between SR 973 and the expressway.

To the north of the expressway, Galloway Road forms the boundary between Sunset and Olympia Heights as it passes housing on its right and a string of Miami-Dade County facilities on its left, including a water treatment plant, cemetery and emergency services. As it crosses Southwest 56th Street, SR 973 properly enters Olympia Heights and resumes its residential feel. 1.1 miles (1.8 km) later, Galloway Road intersects Bird Road (SR 976) amidst shopping malls and crosses into Westchester. Between Southwest 32nd and 28th Streets, SR 973 passes two Roman Catholic high schools and a seminary; it then intersects Coral Way (Southwest 24th Street) a few blocks later again amidst shopping malls.At 16th Street it passes by the First Baptist Church Of Coral Park. The unique building is often said to be in the shape of a whale or a turtle.

=== Northern sections ===
Beyond Northwest 12th Street, Galloway Road crosses a CSX branch railroad line and then travels through a large business precinct punctuated by big-box retail, restaurants and office buildings until it reaches Doral Boulevard, where the CR 973 designation ends. Past here, Galloway Road narrows to four lanes before passing the Doral Golf Resort & Spa. Opposite the resort, the neighborhood becomes increasingly industrial as Northwest 87th Avenue continues north, crossing to both sides of the road beyond Northwest 58th Street. Here, Galloway Road leaves Doral and enters unincorporated Miami-Dade County with no designated communities, and loses its central divider. Soon, Galloway Road passes the former Northwest 58th Street Landfill to its left with more industrial buildings to its right until the road reaches Northwest 74th Street. North of here, Northwest 87th Avenue quickly drops to a dirt access road for a construction company, becoming private soon afterwards. This is the last segment to be named Galloway Road.

Northwest 87th Avenue resumes north of the private property in Medley as a paved industrial side-street between Northwest 90th and 93rd Streets, whereupon it terminates once more. A second section, little more than an industrial laneway, starts across the nearby Florida East Coast Railway tracks and travels north for a few blocks, terminating at the Miami Canal.

The road then resumes at the frontage road for Okeechobee Road (US 27) across the canal in Hialeah Gardens, between its city hall and a Brothers to the Rescue memorial. After crossing SR 932 at an oblique junction, becoming four lanes wide and then crossing a canal, the road forms the boundary between Hialeah Gardens to the west and Hialeah to the east, gaining the additional moniker of West 28th Avenue for its duration through the city. Following a canal north on its left side with condominiums and a shopping mall to its right, the road enters Hialeah proper at West 68th Street (Northwest 122nd Street). West 28th Avenue, still with the canal to its west, passes by tightly packed single-storey houses, then some shops before leaving Hialeah passing over Interstate 75 without an interchange, just west of its terminus, and entering the town of Miami Lakes. Northwest 87th Avenue passes by residential neighborhoods before terminating at Miami Lakes Drive/Northwest 154th Street.

The northernmost section of Northwest 87th Avenue begins as a laneway just to the south of Northwest 164th Street, still in Miami Lakes, across an undeveloped field from the next southerly segment of the road. As it passes Northwest 164th Street, the road expands to a divided four-laned road; however, the southbound carriageway of Northwest 87th Avenue is closed to traffic and is not present north of Northwest 166th Terrace, rendering the road as a two-laned residential street. The road leaves Miami Lakes at Northwest 170th Street and, still as a residential street, it forms the western boundary of Palm Springs North. It passes by the backs of residential neighborhoods until reaching Miami Gardens Drive (SR 860) a mile (1.6 km) later, and expands to four lanes once more as it passes between two shopping malls, re-entering unincorporated Miami-Dade County. After passing by more residential neighborhoods, Northwest 87th Avenue reaches its northern terminus at an incomplete T-junction with Northwest 197th Terrace, traffic being guided around eastwards into that road.

== History ==
Galloway Road was part of a collection of Dade (now Miami-Dade) County streets that the Florida Department of Transportation added to its maintenance list in 1980: it was originally assigned the State Road 915 designation, but in 1983, the number was changed to SR 973 as part of a statewide renumbering.

In 2009, the Federal Highway Administration reported that the road was "unsafe" for travel and had recently caused multiple deaths from accidents on State Road 973.

== Major intersections ==
The entire route is in Miami-Dade County.

Location	mi	km	Destinations	Notes
Pinecrest–Kendall line	0.000	0.000	US 1 (South Dixie Highway / Pinecrest Parkway)	Unsigned SR 5
Kendall	1.382	2.224	SR 990 (Southwest 112th Street / Killian Drive)	
Kendall	2.920	4.699	SR 94 (Southwest 88th Street / Kendall Drive)	
Glenvar Heights–Sunset line	3.45	5.55	SR 878 (Snapper Creek Expressway)	
Glenvar Heights–Sunset line	3.911	6.294	SR 986 (Southwest 72nd Street / Sunset Drive)	
Olympia Heights–Westchester line	6.033	9.709	SR 976 (Southwest 40th Street / Bird Road)	
Westchester	7.023	11.302	Southwest 24th Street / Coral Way	
Westchester	8.018	12.904	US 41 (Southwest 8th Street / Tamiami Trail)	Unsigned SR 90
Fontainebleau	8.535	13.736	SR 968 east (Flagler Street)	Western terminus of SR 968
Fontainebleau–Doral line	9.35	15.05	SR 836 to SR 969 (Milam Dairy Road) / SR 968 (Flagler Street) / US 41 (Southwest 8th Street / Tamiami Trail) / Florida's Turnpike Extension – Airport	Dolphin–Palmetto Interchange
Fontainebleau–Doral line	9.35	15.05	SR 826 (Palmetto Expressway) to I-75	Dolphin–Palmetto Interchange
Doral	9.505	15.297	Northwest 12th Street	North end of state maintenance
Doral	11.305	18.194	Doral Boulevard	
Medley	13.505	21.734	Northwest 74th Street	
1.000 mi = 1.609 km; 1.000 km = 0.621 mi: Electronic toll collection; Route transition
