= Bird Road =

Road in Florida, United States

State Road 976
- Bird Road; Southwest 40th Street
- SR 976 highlighted in red

Route information
- Maintained by FDOT
- Length: 13.7 mi (22.0 km) SR 976 extends 8.5 mi (13.7 km)

Major junctions
- West end: Florida's Turnpike Extension in Tamiami
- SR 826 / SR 874 in Olympia Heights
- East end: US 1 in Miami

Location
- Country: United States
- State: Florida

Highway system
- Florida State Highway System; Interstate; US; State; Former; Pre‑1945; Toll; Scenic
← SR 975	→ SR 979

Bird Road, co-signed State Road 976 (SR 976) from the Homestead Extension of Florida's Turnpike (SR 821) in Westwood Lakes, Florida to U.S. Route 1 (SR 5) in Miami, is a 13.7-mile (22.0 km) main east–west road running south of Downtown Miami in Miami-Dade County, Florida.

== Route description ==
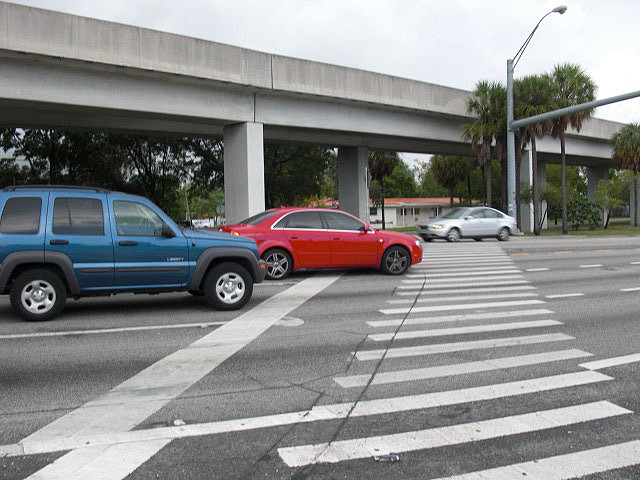
Bird Road at U.S. Route 1

State Road 976 begins on Bird Road at the Homestead Extension of Florida's Turnpike in Tamiami, heading east through Westchester to its north and Westwood Lakes to its south as a primarily commercial six lane divided highway. It crosses State Road 985 before leaving Westwood Lakes and bordering Olympia Heights. Between Southwest 94th Avenue and Southwest 92nd Avenue, Bird Road passes by Bird Bowl, one of the few remaining bowling establishments in Miami-Dade County. Bird Road then crosses State Road 973 (Galloway Road) before forming the northern boundary of Tropical Park. At the northeastern edge of Tropical Park, SR 976 interchanges with the Palmetto and Don Shula Expressways. A block of vintage stores lines the road at the southeast corner of its intersection with Ludlam Road a mile to the east.

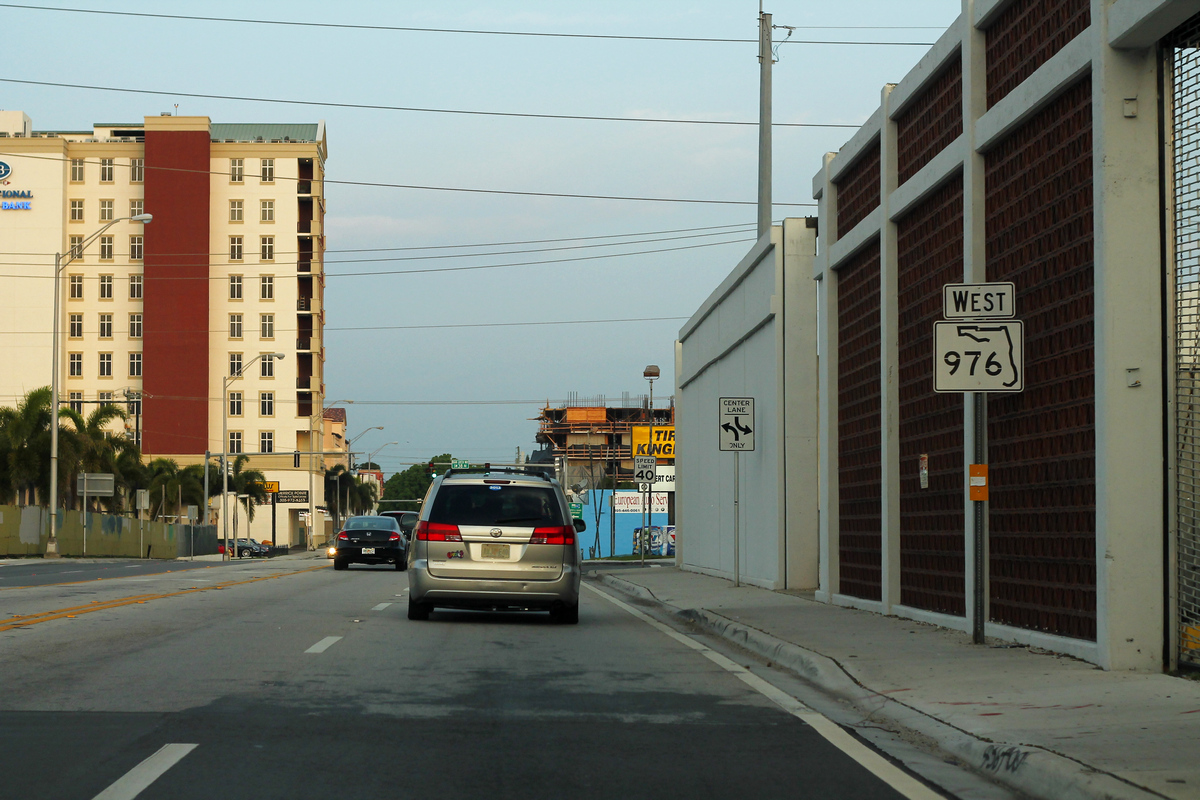
Florida State Road 976 sign on Bird Road in Miami

After crossing Red Road (State Road 959), the road narrows to four lanes as it enters Coral Gables, with the median of the road containing spreading banyan trees, similar to the nearby Coral Way. Between Red Road and LeJeune Road (State Road 953), the road is primarily residential, crossing a couple of golf courses. East of SR 953 and Coral Gables Senior High School, it resumes commercial businesses, and has intersections with Ponce De Leon Boulevard, where the median disappears, and quickly heads towards its eastern terminus of US 1.

East of State Road 976's eastern terminus, Bird Road becomes Southwest 30th Street/Bird Avenue as it traverses the Coconut Grove neighborhood of Miami, intersecting Southwest 27th Avenue and ending at Aviation Avenue one block further east.

West of State Road 976's western terminus, the road jogs slightly to the south to become Southwest 42nd Street and passes through a primarily residential area, with several businesses and strip malls scattered through. Bird Road currently ends at Southwest 162nd Avenue, but more development continues to be built in this area and the road may be extended further west in the future.

== History ==
=== SR 976 ===
When FDOT added Bird Road to its list of state roads in 1980, it was originally designated State Road 930. Three years later the SR 930 signs were removed from the street and replaced with signs with the SR 976 designation.

Bird Road was named after Reverend C.S. and Molly Piercy Bird, who had homesteaded 160 acres that includes the current Biltmore Golf Course.

== Major intersections ==
The entire route is in Miami-Dade County.

Location	mi	km	Destinations	Notes
Tamiami–Westwood Lakes– Westchester tripoint	0.000	0.000	West end of state maintenance	Continues west as Southwest 42nd Street
Tamiami–Westwood Lakes– Westchester tripoint	0.130	0.209	Florida's Turnpike Extension (SR 821) – Airport	Exit 23 on the Turnpike Extension
Westwood Lakes–Westchester line	1.142	1.838	SR 985 (Southwest 107th Avenue)	
Olympia Heights–Westchester line	3.144	5.060	SR 973 (Southwest 87th Avenue / Galloway Road)	
Olympia Heights–Westchester– Coral Terrace–Glenvar Heights quadripoint	4.220	6.791	SR 826 / SR 874 south – Airport	Interchange
South Miami–Coral Terrace– Coral Gables tripoint	6.219	10.009	SR 959 (Southwest 57th Avenue / Red Road)	
Coral Gables	7.740	12.456	SR 953 (Le Jeune Road / Southwest 42nd Avenue) – Airport	
Miami	8.466	13.625	US 1 (South Dixie Highway / SR 5) – Downtown Miami	Eastern terminus of SR 976; continues east as Southwest 30th Street (Bird Avenue)
1.000 mi = 1.609 km; 1.000 km = 0.621 mi
