= Tropical Park =

Urban park in Miami, Florida, US

- Interactive map of Tropical Park
- Type: Municipal
- Location: Miami, Florida, United States
- Coordinates: 25.732°N 80.323°W
- Area: 275 acres (1.11 km^{2})
- Created: 1979
- Operator: Miami-Dade County Parks and Recreation Department
- Website: Tropical Park

Tropical Park is a 275-acre (1.11 km^{2}) urban park in metropolitan Miami, Florida. The park is located just southwest of the intersection of the Palmetto Expressway (SR 826) and Bird Road, just west of South Miami.

== History ==
The land opened as a county public park in 1979, on the grounds of the former Tropical Park Race Track, which had used the lands since 1931.

== Facilities ==
It has a boxing center, fields for football, soccer, and softball, as well as facilities to play basketball, volleyball, and racquetball. Tropical Park has a tennis center with 12 tennis courts that are wheelchair-accessible. There are four lakes within the park, a two-acre (8,100 m^{2}) dog park, as well as paddle boating, and freshwater fishing. Cyclists, joggers, and runners use the miles of paved pathways circulating through the park.

=== Equestrian Center ===
Throughout the year, the park hosts horse shows, rodeos, and other special events at the Tropical Park Equestrian Center. The equestrian center hosts over 30 horse shows a year, including international shows. The old racetrack's stables were used as part of the equestrian center.

=== Stadium ===
The Tropical Park Stadium is home to the Miami-Dade Track and Field Team. It has also hosted prestigious national track and field meets such as the Junior Olympics, USA National Track and Field Championships, and many local high school football games.

=== Santa's Enchanted Forest ===
Annually, from early November through the beginning of January, Santa's Enchanted Forest took over a large part of Tropical Park until 2019. The holiday event featured six million lights, a giant Christmas tree, and carnival rides.

=== Christmas Wonderland ===
After Santa's Enchanted Forest relocated, the area that was home to the carnival was replaced with a very similar annually celebrated holiday event that opens from November to January. Christmas Wonderland first opened in 2023 and still celebrates the holidays with carnival rides, a big LED Ferris wheel, food stands, and millions of lights.
