= Florida State Road 959 =

State highway in Florida, United States

State Road 959
- West 57th Avenue / Red Road
- SR 959 highlighted in red

Route information
- Maintained by FDOT
- Length: 5.381 mi (8.660 km)
- Existed: 1980–present

Major junctions
- South end: US 1 in South Miami-Coral Gables
- US 41 in Coral Gables-West Miami; SR 836 near Miami International Airport
- North end: Perimeter Road at Miami International Airport

Location
- Country: United States
- State: Florida

Highway system
- Florida State Highway System; Interstate; US; State; Former; Pre‑1945; Toll; Scenic
← SR 953	→ SR 960

State Road 959 (SR 959), known locally as West 57th Avenue and Red Road, is a 5.381-mile-long (8.660 km) north-south Florida state highway located in south Miami-Dade County west of Downtown Miami. It runs from U.S. 1 at the south end at the South Miami-Coral Gables border to Perimeter Road, just south of the runway of the Miami International Airport at its north end.

== Route description ==
State Road 959 begins at the intersection with Red Road and US 1 (South Dixie Highway), with SR 959 heading north, going through the southwestern end of the University of Miami campus, and then through residential areas, as it acts as the dividing line between Coral Gables to its east and South Miami and patches of unincorporated Miami-Dade County to the west between US 1 and SR 976 (Bird Road). North of Bird Road, Red Road continues through the residential sections of Coral Gables, and enters the residential areas of West Miami, crossing US 41 (Tamiami Trail). SR 959 then enters Miami, intersecting SR 968 (Flagler Street). North of NW 5th Street, Red Road becomes more commercial as it approaches the airport area, with a major shopping center and hotel at the intersection with NW 7th Street. Following that, SR 959 then crosses a canal and has an interchange with the Dolphin Expressway (SR 836), with the road terminating just north of the interchange at a dead end intersection with North 12th Street/Perimeter Road, just south of the Miami International Airport runway.

== History ==
This section of Red Road received its FDOT of SR 959 designation in 1980. Its original configuration was 2.7 miles (4.3 km) longer as it stretched southward to the intersection of Red Road and Southwest 111th Street (Killian Drive), where it met the eastern end of SR 990 just outside the parking lot of the original Parrot Jungle, a major tourist attraction. Between 1995 and 2001, FDOT truncated several State Roads in Miami-Dade County, and both SR 959 and SR 990 were cut back to terminate at US 1.

== Major intersections ==
The entire route is in Miami-Dade County.

Location	mi	km	Destinations	Notes
Coral Gables–South Miami line	0.000	0.000	US 1 (South Dixie Highway / SR 5)	no left turn from either direction of SR 959
Coral Gables	1.821	2.931	SR 976 (Southwest 40th Street / Bird Road)	
Coral Gables	2.807	4.517	Coral Way / Southwest 24th Street	
Coral Gables–West Miami line	3.855	6.204	US 41 (Southwest 8th Street / Tamiami Trail / SR 90)	
Miami	4.353	7.005	SR 968 (Flagler Street)	
	5.27	8.48	SR 836 to I-95 / SR 826 / Florida's Turnpike Extension – Airport	
	5.381	8.660	Perimeter Road	Northern terminus
1.000 mi = 1.609 km; 1.000 km = 0.621 mi
