= Coral Terrace, Florida =

Census-designated Suburb in Florida

- Census-designated place
- Location in Miami-Dade County and the state of Florida

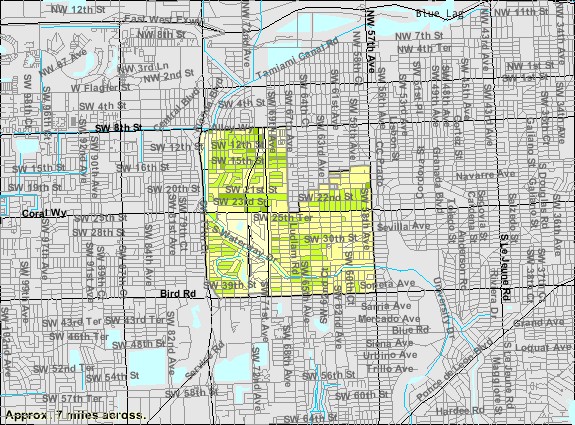
- U.S. Census Bureau map showing CDP boundaries
- Coordinates: 25°45′05″N 80°18′22″W
- Country: United States
- State: Florida
- County: Miami-Dade

Area
  - Total: 3.43 sq mi (8.89 km^{2})
  - Land: 3.36 sq mi (8.70 km^{2})
  - Water: 0.073 sq mi (0.19 km^{2})
- Elevation: 7 ft (2.1 m)

Population (2020)
  - Total: 23,142
  - Density: 6,889.5/sq mi (2,660.05/km^{2})
- Time zone: UTC-5 (Eastern (EST))
  - Summer (DST): UTC-4 (EDT)
- ZIP Codes: 33144 (West Miami); 33155 (Miami)
- Area codes: 305, 786, 645
- FIPS code: 12-14412
- GNIS feature ID: 2402796

Coral Terrace is a suburban unincorporated community and census-designated place (CDP) in Miami-Dade County, Florida, United States. It is part of the Miami metropolitan area of South Florida. The population was 23,142 at the 2020 census, down from 24,376 in 2010.

== Geography ==
Coral Terrace is located 7 miles (11 km) west of downtown Miami. It is bordered to the north by the Miami city limits, to the northeast by the city of West Miami, to the east by the city of Coral Gables, to the south by the city of South Miami and unincorporated Glenvar Heights, to the southwest by Olympia Heights, to the west by Westchester, and to the northwest by Fontainebleau, all unincorporated.

Florida State Road 826 (the Palmetto Expressway) forms the western border of Coral Terrace. U.S. Route 41 (SW 8th Street) forms the northern border with Miami, State Road 959 (S Red Road) forms the eastern border with Coral Gables, and State Road 976 (SW 40th Street) forms the southern border.

According to the United States Census Bureau, the Coral Terrace CDP has a total area of 3.43 square miles (8.9 km^{2}), of which 3.36 square miles (8.7 km^{2}) are land and 0.07 square miles (0.18 km^{2}) (2.10%) are water.

== Demographics ==
Historical population
Census	Pop.	Note	%±
1980	22,702		—
1990	23,255		2.4%
2000	24,380		4.8%
2010	24,376		0.0%
2020	23,142		−5.1%

=== Racial and ethnic composition ===
Coral Terrace CDP, Florida – Racial and ethnic composition Note: the US Census treats Hispanic/Latino as an ethnic category. This table excludes Latinos from the racial categories and assigns them to a separate category. Hispanics/Latinos may be of any race.
Race / Ethnicity (NH = Non-Hispanic)	Pop 2010	Pop 2020	% 2010	% 2020
White (NH)	2,502	2,105	10.26%	9.10%
Black or African American (NH)	83	92	0.34%	0.40%
Native American or Alaska Native (NH)	10	5	0.04%	0.02%
Asian (NH)	126	166	0.52%	0.72%
Pacific Islander or Native Hawaiian (NH)	0	6	0.00%	0.03%
Some other race (NH)	9	54	0.04%	0.23%
Mixed race or Multiracial (NH)	51	147	0.21%	0.64%
Hispanic or Latino (any race)	21,595	20,567	88.60%	88.87%
Total	24,376	23,142	100.00%	100.00%

=== 2020 census ===
As of the 2020 census, Coral Terrace had a population of 23,142. The median age was 46.8 years. 15.9% of residents were under the age of 18 and 23.5% of residents were 65 years of age or older. For every 100 females there were 89.7 males, and for every 100 females age 18 and over there were 87.5 males age 18 and over.

100.0% of residents lived in urban areas, while 0.0% lived in rural areas.

There were 7,745 households in Coral Terrace, of which 30.9% had children under the age of 18 living in them. Of all households, 47.4% were married-couple households, 15.5% were households with a male householder and no spouse or partner present, and 28.7% were households with a female householder and no spouse or partner present. About 17.7% of all households were made up of individuals and 9.7% had someone living alone who was 65 years of age or older. There were 6,039 families residing in the CDP.

There were 8,113 housing units, of which 4.5% were vacant. The homeowner vacancy rate was 1.6% and the rental vacancy rate was 3.8%.

Racial composition as of the 2020 census
Race	Number	Percent
White	7,201	31.1%
Black or African American	171	0.7%
American Indian and Alaska Native	26	0.1%
Asian	189	0.8%
Native Hawaiian and Other Pacific Islander	6	0.0%
Some other race	2,116	9.1%
Two or more races	13,433	58.0%
Hispanic or Latino (of any race)	20,567	88.9%

=== 2010 census ===
As of the 2010 United States census, there were 24,376 people, 7,314 households, and 5,599 families residing in the CDP.

=== 2000 census ===
As of the census of 2000, there were 24,380 people, 7,744 households, and 6,171 families residing in the CDP. The population density was 7,110.0 inhabitants per square mile (2,745.2/km^{2}). There were 7,955 housing units at an average density of 2,319.9 per square mile (895.7/km^{2}). The racial makeup of the CDP was 93.06% White (16.5% were Non-Hispanic White), 1.15% African American, 0.10% Native American, 0.53% Asian, 0.01% Pacific Islander, 2.84% from other races, and 2.31% from two or more races. Hispanic or Latino of any race were 82.10% of the population.

As of 2000, there were 7,744 households, out of which 29.3% had children under the age of 18 living with them, 58.3% were married couples living together, 15.6% had a female householder with no husband present, and 20.3% were non-families. 15.4% of all households were made up of individuals, and 8.1% had someone living alone who was 65 years of age or older. The average household size was 3.07, and the average family size was 3.30.

In 2000, in the CDP, the population was spread out, with 20.3% under the age of 18, 6.7% from 18 to 24, 27.8% from 25 to 44, 24.6% from 45 to 64, and 20.6% who were 65 years of age or older. The median age was 41 years. For every 100 females, there were 89.6 males. For every 100 females age 18 and over, there were 85.2 males.

In 2000, the median income for a household in the CDP was $38,523, and the median income for a family was $39,624. Males had a median income of $26,846 versus $23,190 for females. The per capita income for the CDP was $15,291. About 8.6% of families and 11.2% of the population were below the poverty line, including 9.1% of those under age 18 and 12.8% of those age 65 or over.

As of 2000, 85.18% spoke Spanish as a first language, and 14.11% spoke English as their first language.
