= Florida State Road 944 =

State highway in Florida, United States

State Road 944
- North 54th Street
- SR 944 highlighted in red

Route information
- Maintained by FDOT
- Length: 5.822 mi (9.370 km)
- Existed: 1950; 1983 (as SR 944)–present

Major junctions
- West end: US 27 in Hialeah
- US 441 in Miami
- East end: US 1 in Miami

Location
- Country: United States
- State: Florida
- Counties: Miami-Dade

Highway system
- Florida State Highway System; Interstate; US; State; Former; Pre‑1945; Toll; Scenic
← SR 934	→ SR 948

State Road 944 (SR 944), locally known as Hialeah Drive and North 54th Street, is a 5.822-mile-long (9.370 km) east–west street spanning Hialeah and Miami, Florida. The western terminus is an intersection with Okeechobee Road (US 27/SR 25) in Hialeah; its eastern terminus is an intersection with Biscayne Boulevard (U.S. Route 1/SR 5). Along with the north–south Palm Avenue, Hialeah Drive is a baseline for addresses in the City of Hialeah (most of Miami-Dade County uses Flagler Street and Miami Avenue for its baselines).

== Route description ==
SR 944 begins at an intersection with US 27/SR 25 in Hialeah, heading east as four-lane undivided Northwest 54th Street/Hialeah Drive. The road passes through commercial areas before heading through a mix of suburban homes and businesses, becoming a divided highway at the intersection with East 6th Avenue. The state road crosses SR 953 and passes more residences and businesses, with the median becoming a center left-turn lane. SR 944 enters industrial areas and crosses a CSX railroad line that also carries Amtrak and Tri-Rail. At the intersection with Northwest 36th Avenue, the state road enters Miami and becomes Northwest 54th Street, passing through urban residential and commercial areas. The road intersects SR 9, at which point it passes under Metrorail's Green Line. Past this intersection, SR 944 passes through more developed areas as a four-lane undivided road. Farther east, the state road reaches a junction with US 441/SR 7. A short distance later, SR 944 passes under I-95/SR 9A without an interchange. The road continues east past more urban homes and businesses, becoming Northeast 54th Street at the intersection with North Miami Avenue. SR 944 crosses the Florida East Coast Railway before coming to its eastern terminus at US 1/SR 5 (Biscayne Boulevard).

== History ==
The genesis of today's SR 944 began when FDOT extended US 27 southward from Tallahassee to Miami in 1949. While the "new" U.S. Highway was routed around Lake Okeechobee and southeastward to Miami along the recently redesignated State Road 25 (the road was SR 26 prior to 1945), the Florida Department of Transportation added plans for three bypass routes of Miami: the north–south SR 27 (now SR 997 and SR 9336), the east–west SR 826 (which morphed into the Palmetto Expressway several years after its opening), and the east–west State Road 25A.

Because it was routed over previously existing streets, SR 25A received its designation in 1950, well ahead of the other two planned bypasses; the configuration of the route has been unchanged since then. In a 1983 renumbering, the FDOT replaced the SR 25A designation with SR 944, the street's new insignia.

== Major intersections ==
The entire route is in Miami-Dade County.

Location	mi	km	Destinations	Notes
Hialeah	0.000	0.000	US 27 (Okeechobee Road / SR 25) / Curtiss Parkway – Miami Springs	
Hialeah	0.943	1.518	SR 953 (East 8th Avenue / Northwest 42nd Avenue / Le Jeune Road)	
	2.464	3.965	SR 9 (Northwest 27th Avenue / Unity Boulevard)	
Miami	4.497	7.237	US 441 (Northwest 7th Avenue / SR 7)	
Miami	4.615	7.427	To I-95 / Frontage Road / Northwest 6th Avenue	
Miami	5.822	9.370	US 1 (Biscayne Boulevard / SR 5)	
1.000 mi = 1.609 km; 1.000 km = 0.621 mi
