= The Mall at 163rd Street =

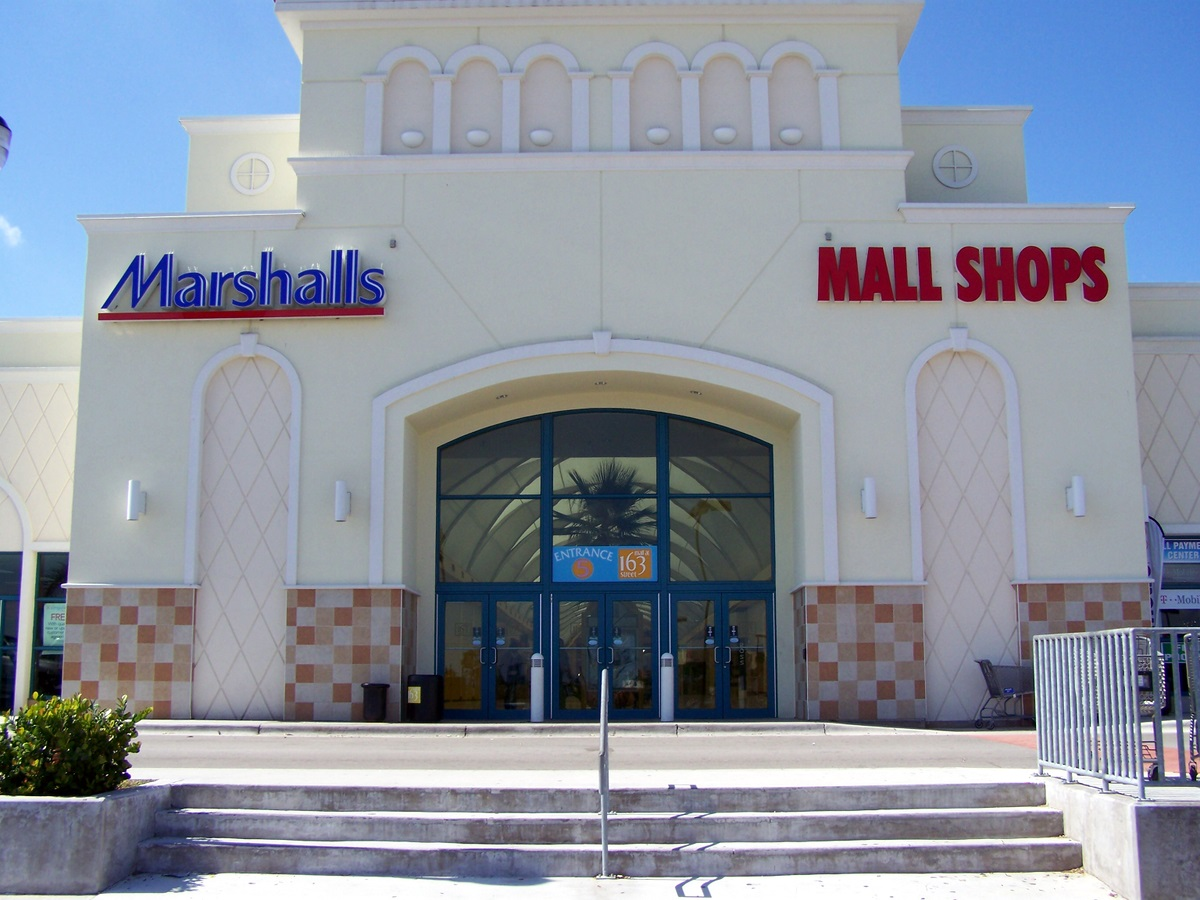
- The mall's east entrance
- Location: North Miami Beach, Florida; United States
- Coordinates: 25.927418°N 80.173298°W
- Address: 1421 Northeast 163rd Street
- Opened: November 1, 1956; 70 years ago
- Closed: by 2026 (enclosed mall portion only)
- Developer: Food Fair Properties
- Manager: Brixmor Property Group
- Owner: Brixmor Property Group
- Architect: Gamble, Pownall & Gilroy
- Num. of stores: 50+
- Num. of anchor tenants: 5
- Floor area: 373,273 square feet (34,678.2 m^{2})
- Floors: 3

The Mall at 163rd Street was an enclosed shopping mall and power center in North Miami Beach, Florida. From its opening as an open-air shopping center in 1956, it has been converted into an enclosed mall, but was later redeveloped as a combination of both formats. The mall's anchors are The Home Depot, Foot Locker, Ross Stores, and Wal-Mart Supercenter.

== History ==
The mall opened on November 1, 1956, as The 163rd Street Shopping Center, anchored by a Raymond Loewy-designed Burdines and later, Richard's. In addition, it sported forty-nine outlets, including Food Fair (later Pantry Pride), JCPenney, M and M Cafeteria, Walgreens, and Woolworth.

Wometco 163rd Street Theatre served as an outparcel, and by 1961, was doubled as the 163rd Street & Patio Theater. In February 1971, Jordan Marsh opened a three-story location at the shopping center's east wing.

Until the late 1970s, the center court fronting Burdines had provided countless kiddie rides, which were all encircled by a train track. A go-kart track also existed in the north parking lot, but was destroyed by Hurricane Cleo and never rebuilt.

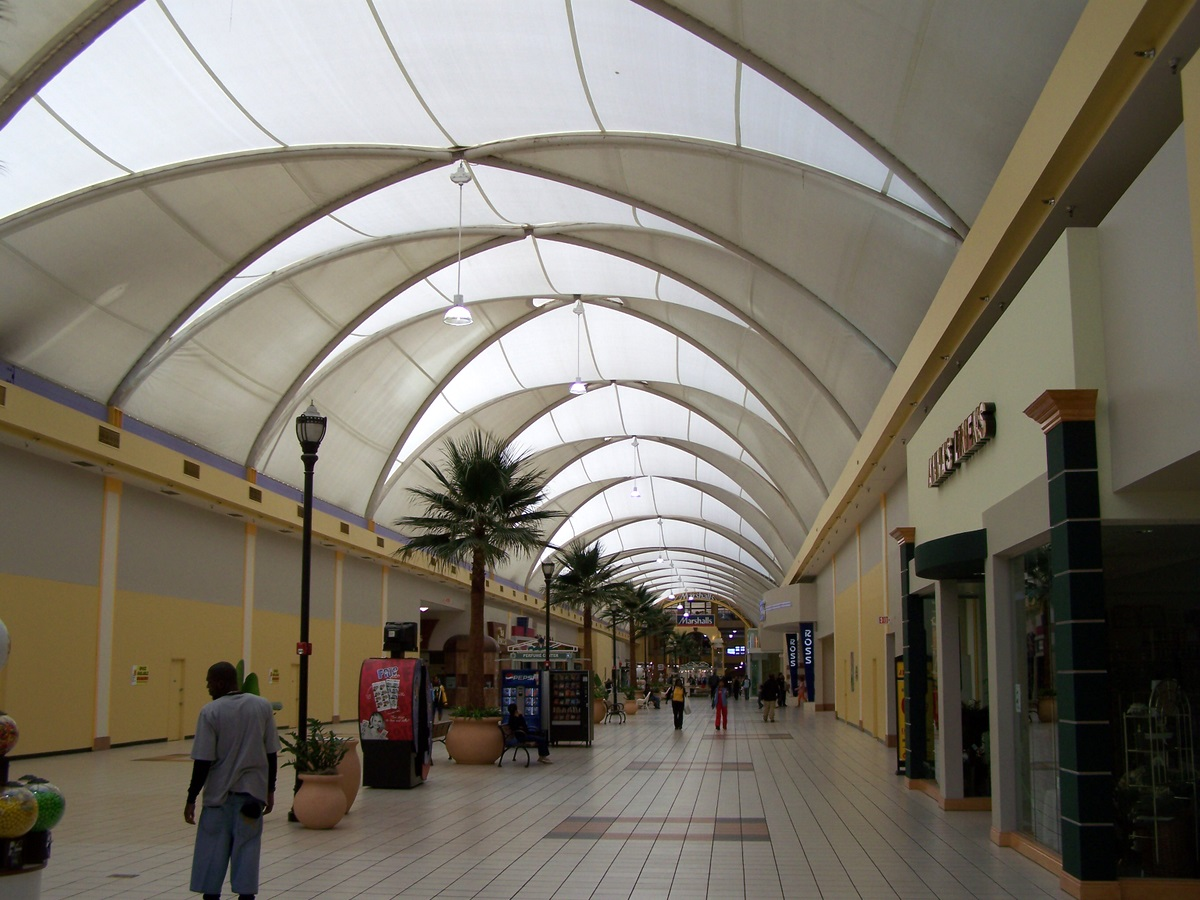
"The Dome", the mall's interior enclosed by a Teflon canvas that's held by metal arches

From 1980 to October 1982, the shopping center was converted into a climate-controlled enclosed mall. Colossal metal arches were flanked over the main plaza that the stores resided along, and a white, translucent, Teflon-coated fiberglass was placed over them. Richard's, which closed on January 11, 1980, as part of a chain-wide closure, was fashioned into a three-floor atrium. The upper level became a food court while the lower level allowed for the expansion of Spec's Music as Spec's Metro. It was at this time the mall was rebranded to its current name, however the mall's transformation was often called The Miracle on 163rd Street.

When Aventura Mall opened in 1983, JCPenney moved to the new mall, in effect closing its 163rd Street store. Unable to lure a replacement anchor, the Penney's space was divided into six specialty store spaces, while the basement became an Oshman's sporting goods store.

Pantry Pride closed in 1984, and Service Merchandise opened as its replacement, creating a mall entrance that Pantry Pride didn't possess. The third and most significant change involved the food court's closure due to a lack of significant foot traffic.

However, it was gradually relocated downstairs to the second floor of the atrium, while the third floor converted to a Marshalls. An extra-long escalator was installed to shuttle shoppers directly up to the third floor Marshalls.

The decline of the mall began in 1991 when Jordan Marsh closed. Although a Mervyn's department store took over the lower two floors of the three-story structure, it closed in 1995.

The biggest hit however took place in 1999, when Burdines closed and relocated to Aventura Mall. Vacancies increased throughout the late 1990s, leaving only Marshalls and a few smaller inline stores.

The conversion of the mall into a power center began in 1996, when the movie theater outparcel was demolished to make way for The Home Depot.

A major change to the enclosed mall itself occurred in October 2003, when the Jordan Marsh building, its adjoining parking structure, and about ⅓ of the mall was demolished and replaced with a Wal-Mart Supercenter that opened in September, 2005.

The remaining mall was reworked to include big-box stores, including Office Depot and Ross. Steve & Barry's opened on the upper level of the former Burdines in 2007, but closed in 2009 after a nationwide liquidation. In 2015, the anchor store, office depot store closed, temporarily replaced by a Halloween City store in 2017.

In 2019, Closeouts World, a retailer selling department store apparel, shoes, and other items, opened in the mall.

As of 2021, Marshalls has left the mall moving down the street to a new plaza, leaving that space open.

== Redevelopment & closure ==
The enclosed mall portion had closed by 2026, although an exact closure date has not been publicly documented.

The property is planned for a $150 million redevelopment incorporating new retail, entertainment and medical uses. The redevelopment plans call for portions of the former mall to be converted to open-air space, with a mixed-use phase potentially adding residential development.
