= Florida State Road 969 =

State highway in Florida, United States

State Road 969
- Milam Dairy Road; Northwest 72nd Avenue

Route information
- Maintained by FDOT
- Length: 5.228 mi (8.414 km)
- Existed: 1983 (as SR 969)–present

Major junctions
- South end: SR 968 in Miami
- SR 836 / SR 826 near Miami; SR 948 near Doral
- North end: SR 934 in Medley

Location
- Country: United States
- State: Florida
- Counties: Miami-Dade

Highway system
- Florida State Highway System; Interstate; US; State; Former; Pre‑1945; Toll; Scenic
← SR 968	→ SR 970

State Road 969 (SR 969), locally known as Milam Dairy Road and West 72nd Avenue, is a 5.2-mile-long (8.4 km) north–south street west of Miami International Airport in western Miami-Dade County, Florida. The southern terminus is currently an intersection with SR 968 (Flagler Street) in the city of Miami, and its northern terminus is an intersection with SR 934, just south of Medley.

== Route description ==
State Road 969 begins at Flagler Street (SR 968) and heads north through residential areas, quickly intersecting the Dolphin Expressway. North of the Dolphin Expressway, SR 969 borders the Miami International Airport to its east, and airport-related business to the west as the road curves around the western end of the airport to accommodate an extended runway. North of the runway, SR 969 resumes in its cardinal north direction and passes by and through business parks and industrial parks for the remainder of the road. The road intersects State Road 948 near Virginia Gardens, with SR 969 continuing north. Just south of the southern terminus, SR 969 passes through a rail yard operated and maintained by Miami-Dade Transit. The road finally terminates at State Road 934, at the western end of the Hialeah Expressway.

Except for the curved section of SR 969 at the airport, the Palmetto Expressway (SR 826) parallels SR 969 0.5-mile (0.80 km) to the west.

== History ==
Milam Dairy Road received its current SR 969 designation in 1983, when FDOT reassigned numbers to a collection of southeastern Florida streets. Prior to the reassignment, Milam Dairy Road/West 72nd Avenue was signed State Road 919.

In the late 1980s, a curve around the airport was extended southward with a bridge over the Dolphin Expressway, removing the portion of North 12th Street from the route. This curve was implemented after the airport runway was extended during the early 1980s, and the bridge was removed during the post-2011 expansion of the Dolphin Expressway. Originally, northbound traffic went north on West 72nd Avenue, and then west on North 12th Street, and then north again on the curved West 72nd Avenue around the airport.

Until 2001, signage indicated that SR 969 actually extended two blocks south into the Flagami section of Miami, to Tamiami Boulevard (only southbound traffic saw the SR 969 reassurance sign just south of Flagler Street).

== Major intersections ==
The entire route is in Miami-Dade County.

Location	mi	km	Destinations	Notes
Miami	0.000	0.000	SR 968 (Flagler Street)	
	0.72	1.16	SR 836 to SR 826 / Florida's Turnpike Extension – Key West	
	3.081	4.958	SR 948 (Doral Boulevard) to SR 826	Northwest 36th Street Extension
	5.191	8.354	SR 934 (Hialeah Expressway)	Northwest 74th Street Connector
Medley	5.228	8.414	Northwest 74th Street / Milam Dairy Road north	Continues north without state designation
1.000 mi = 1.609 km; 1.000 km = 0.621 mi
