= Westchester, Florida =

- Census-designated place
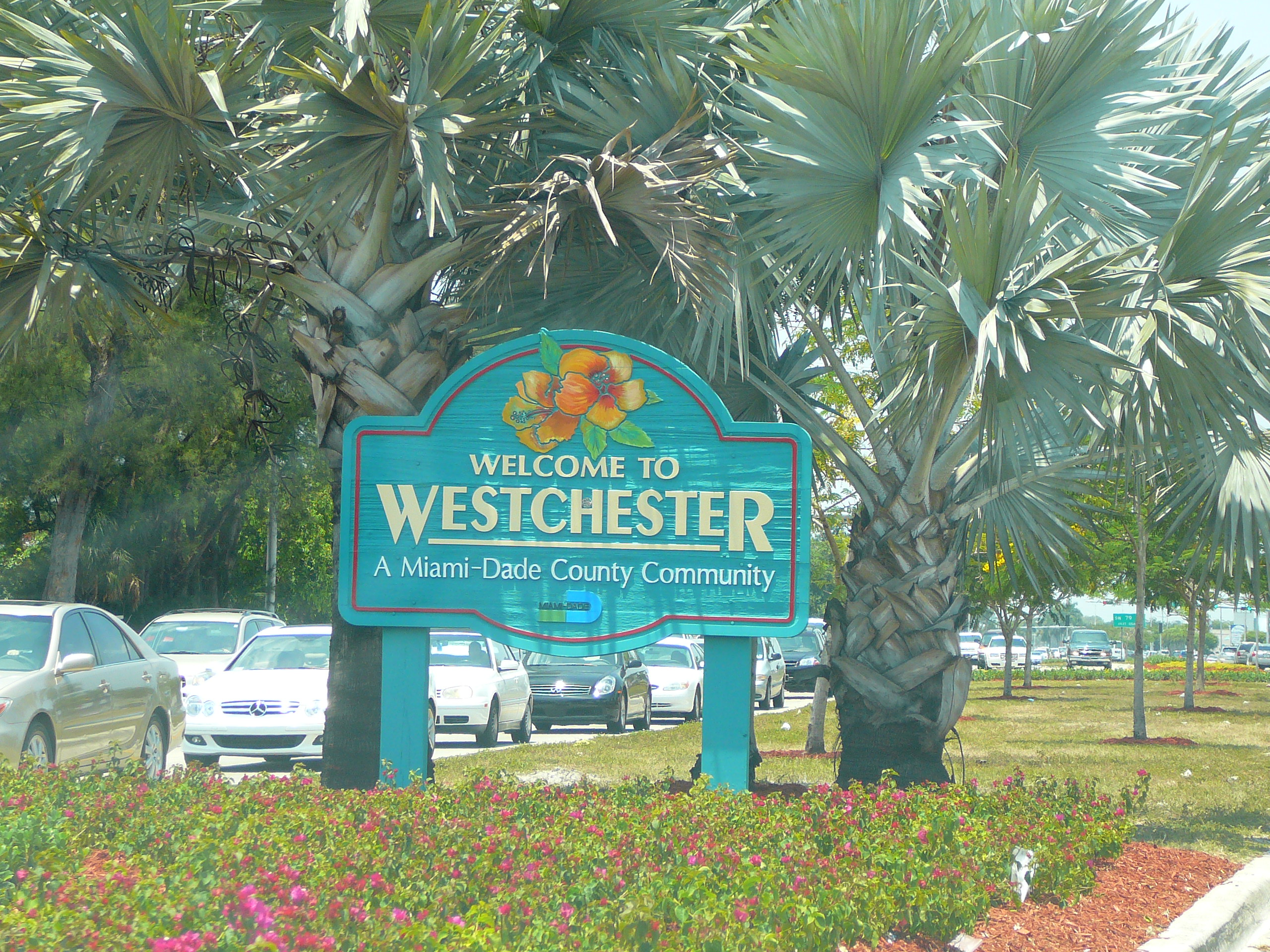
- Sign marking entrance to Westchester on Bird Road, just west of the Palmetto Expressway

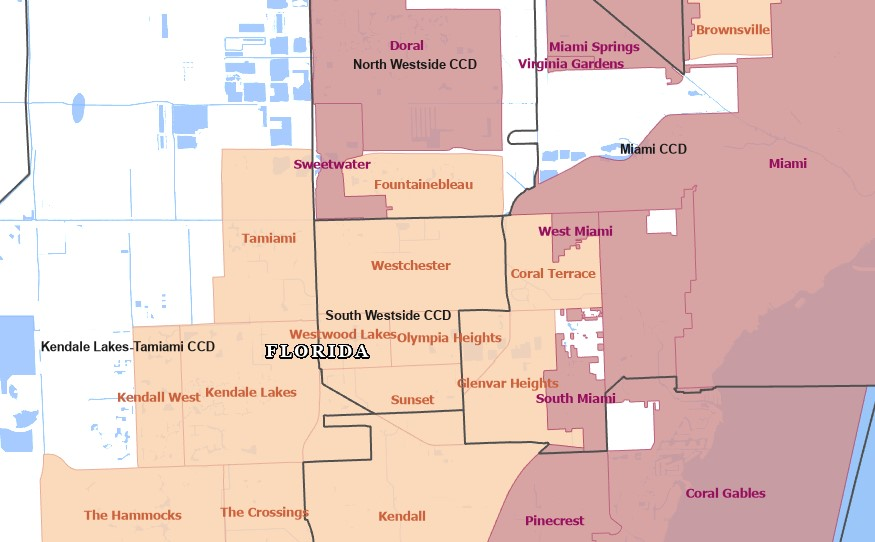
- Map of Westchester CDP after merging with University Park CDP in 2020
- Coordinates: 25°44′50″N 80°22′03″W
- Country: United States
- State: Florida
- County: Miami-Dade
- Established: 1860

Area
  - Total: 8.10 sq mi (20.99 km^{2})
  - Land: 7.95 sq mi (20.60 km^{2})
  - Water: 0.15 sq mi (0.40 km^{2})
- Elevation: 7 ft (2.1 m)

Population (2020)
  - Total: 56,384
  - Density: 7,089.7/sq mi (2,737.34/km^{2})
- Time zone: UTC-5 (Eastern (EST))
  - Summer (DST): UTC-4 (EDT)
- ZIP Codes: 33144, 33155, 33165, 33174, 33175 (all Miami)
- Area codes: 305, 786, 645
- FIPS code: 12-76075
- GNIS feature ID: 2403012

Westchester is a census-designated place (CDP) and neighborhood in Miami-Dade County, Florida. It is part of the Miami metropolitan area of South Florida. Prior to the 2020 U.S. census, the neighboring University Park CDP was merged into Westchester CDP, effectively doubling its geography and population. Per the 2020 census, the population was 56,384.

== Geography ==
Westchester is located 10 miles (16 km) west of downtown Miami. It is bordered to the north by Sweetwater and Fontainebleau, to the east by Coral Terrace, to the south by Olympia Heights and Westwood Lakes, and to the west by Tamiami. The former University Park CDP occupies the west half of the current Westchester CDP. Florida International University is in the northwest portion of the CDP.

According to the United States Census Bureau, the Westchester CDP has a total area of 8.11 square miles (21.0 km^{2}), of which 0.15 square miles (0.39 km^{2}), or 1.89%, are water.

== Demographics ==
Historical population
Census	Pop.	Note	%±
1980	29,272		—
1990	29,883		2.1%
2000	30,271		1.3%
2010	29,862		−1.4%
2020	56,384		88.8%
U.S. Decennial Census; 2010 2020; In 2020, University Park CDP was merged into Westchester CDP.

=== Racial and ethnic composition ===
Westchester CDP, Florida – Racial and ethnic composition Note: the US Census treats Hispanic/Latino as an ethnic category. This table excludes Latinos from the racial categories and assigns them to a separate category. Hispanics/Latinos may be of any race.
Race / Ethnicity (NH = Non-Hispanic)	Pop 2000	Pop 2010	Pop 2020	% 2000	% 2010	% 2020
White alone (NH)	4,142	2,404	4,005	13.68%	8.05%	7.10%
Black or African American alone (NH)	53	73	1,264	0.18%	0.24%	2.24%
Native American or Alaska Native alone (NH)	6	9	15	0.02%	0.03%	0.03%
Asian alone (NH)	134	114	724	0.44%	0.38%	1.28%
Native Hawaiian or Pacific Islander alone (NH)	1	0	9	0.00%	0.00%	0.02%
Other race alone (NH)	10	6	154	0.03%	0.02%	0.27%
Mixed race or Multiracial (NH)	101	45	337	0.33%	0.15%	0.60%
Hispanic or Latino (any race)	25,824	27,211	49,876	85.31%	91.12%	88.46%
Total	30,271	29,862	56,384	100.00%	100.00%	100.00%

=== 2020 census ===
As of the 2020 census, Westchester had a population of 56,384. The median age was 45.3 years. 15.1% of residents were under the age of 18 and 23.2% of residents were 65 years of age or older. For every 100 females there were 86.6 males, and for every 100 females age 18 and over there were 83.6 males age 18 and over.

100.0% of residents lived in urban areas, while 0.0% lived in rural areas.

There were 17,791 households in Westchester, of which 29.7% had children under the age of 18 living in them. Of all households, 47.1% were married-couple households, 13.9% were households with a male householder and no spouse or partner present, and 31.0% were households with a female householder and no spouse or partner present. About 18.0% of all households were made up of individuals and 11.2% had someone living alone who was 65 years of age or older.

There were 18,362 housing units, of which 3.1% were vacant. The homeowner vacancy rate was 0.5% and the rental vacancy rate was 2.8%.

Racial composition as of the 2020 census
Race	Number	Percent
White	15,503	27.5%
Black or African American	1,454	2.6%
American Indian and Alaska Native	107	0.2%
Asian	771	1.4%
Native Hawaiian and Other Pacific Islander	13	0.0%
Some other race	6,718	11.9%
Two or more races	31,818	56.4%
Hispanic or Latino (of any race)	49,876	88.5%

=== 2010 census ===
As of the 2010 United States census, there were 29,862 people, 9,468 households, and 7,255 families residing in the CDP.

=== 2000 census ===
As of the census of 2000, there were 30,271 people, 9,764 households, and 7,947 families residing in the CDP. The population density was 7,539.9 inhabitants per square mile (2,911.2/km^{2}). There were 9,938 housing units at an average density of 2,475.4 per square mile (955.8/km^{2}). The racial makeup of the CDP was 93.78% White (13.7% were Non-Hispanic White), 0.61% African American, 0.04% Native American, 0.51% Asian, 2.81% from other races, and 2.23% from two or more races. Hispanic or Latino of any race were 85.31% of the population.

As of 2000, there were 9,764 households, out of which 28.0% had children under the age of 18 living with them, 60.5% were married couples living together, 15.7% had a female householder with no husband present, and 18.6% were non-families. 14.8% of all households were made up of individuals, and 8.6% had someone living alone who was 65 years of age or older. The average household size was 3.07 and the average family size was 3.33.

In 2000, in the CDP, the population was spread out, with 18.7% under the age of 18, 7.2% from 18 to 24, 26.7% from 25 to 44, 24.4% from 45 to 64, and 23.0% who were 65 years of age or older. The median age was 43 years. For every 100 females, there were 87.2 males. For every 100 females age 18 and over, there were 83.4 males.

In 2000, the median income for a household in the CDP was $40,762, and the median income for a family was $44,863. Males had a median income of $29,629 versus $24,235 for females. The per capita income for the CDP was $17,264. About 8.5% of families and 11.8% of the population were below the poverty line, including 13.0% of those under age 18 and 13.0% of those age 65 or over.

As of 2000, speakers of Spanish as a first language accounted for 88.81% of residents, while English was the mother tongue of 10.78% of the population.

== Government and infrastructure ==
The Miami-Dade Fire Rescue operates Station 3 Tropical Park in Westchester.

The National Weather Service Miami Office is on subleased area on the FIU campus.

== Education ==
The community of Westchester is home to nine public schools administered by Miami-Dade County Public Schools, four Catholic private elementary and secondary schools, one private Roman Catholic college, and one public university.

=== Public schools ===
High schools

- Miami Coral Park High School
- Southwest Miami Senior High School (Olympia Heights, serves southern portions of Westchester)

K-8 schools

- Everglades K-8 Center

Middle schools

- Rockway Middle School
- West Miami Middle School (outside of the CDP but serving a section of the CDP)

Elementary schools

- Banyan Elementary School
- Coral Park Elementary School
- Emerson Elementary School
- Carlos Finlay Elementary School, on the FIU campus
- Olympia Heights Elementary School (in the boundary of the 2000/2010 US Census University Park CDP, served a southwest section of the 2000/2010 US Census Westchester CDP)
- Rockway Elementary School

=== Private schools ===
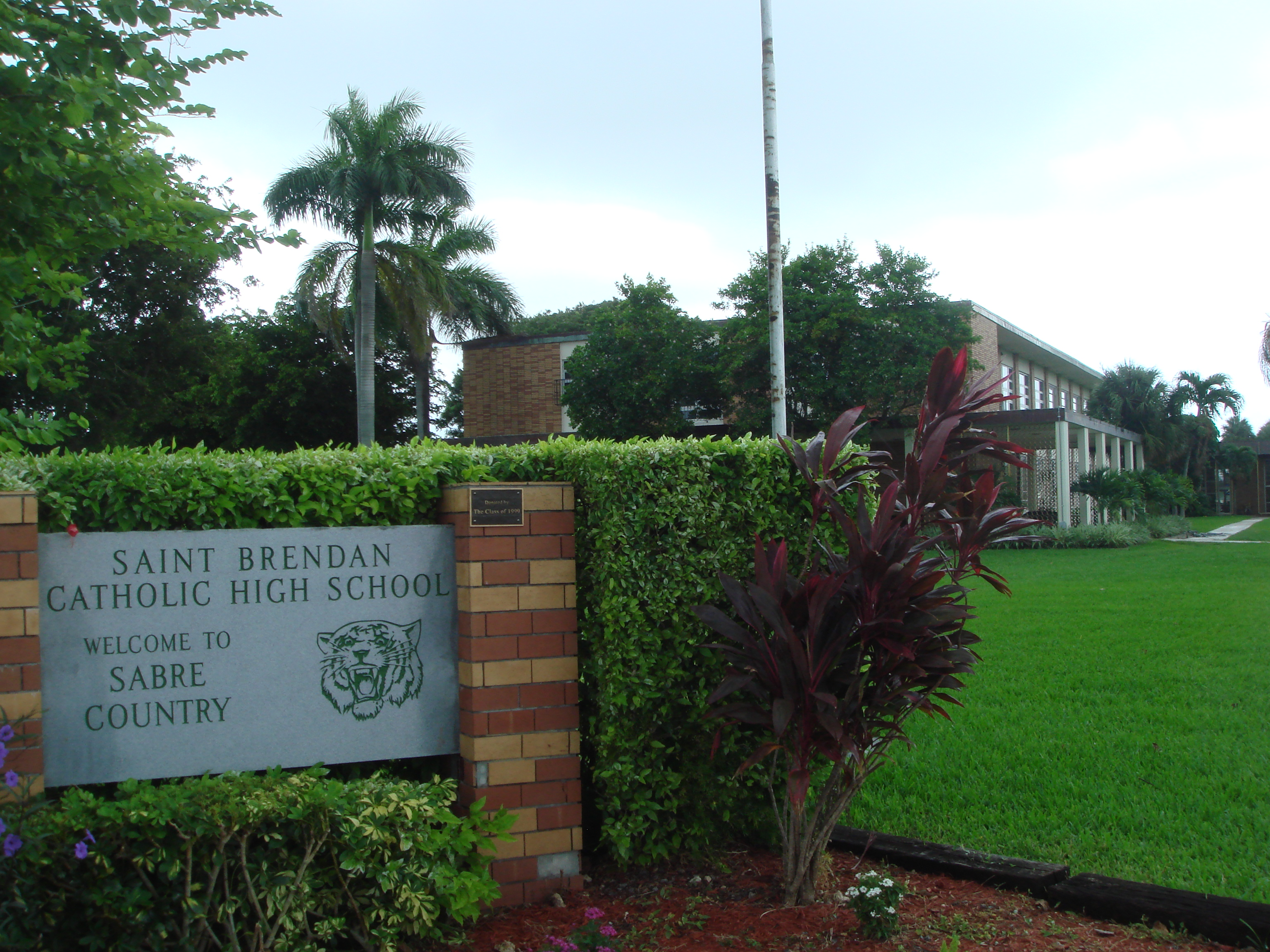
St. Brendan High School

Roman Catholic private schools are operated by and/or are affiliated with the Roman Catholic Archdiocese of Miami.

- Christopher Columbus High School - Catholic private school
- St. Brendan High School - Catholic private school
- St. Agatha Catholic School (Catholic private school; in University Park CDP)
- St. Brendan Elementary School (Catholic private school)
- King's Christian
- Gladeview Christian
- Florida Christian School - Olympia Heights

=== Universities and colleges ===
- Florida International University (formerly in the University Park CDP)
- St. John Vianney College Seminary - Catholic private college

=== Public libraries ===
Miami-Dade Public Library operates the Westchester Regional Library.

=== Miscellaneous education ===
The Miami Hoshuko, a supplementary weekend Japanese school, holds its classes at the Iglesia Bautista de Coral Park ("Coral Park Baptist Church") in Westchester. The school offices are located in Doral. The school was established in 1984.

== See also ==
- List of census-designated places in Florida
