= Westwood Lakes, Florida =

- Census-designated place
- Location in Miami-Dade County and the state of Florida

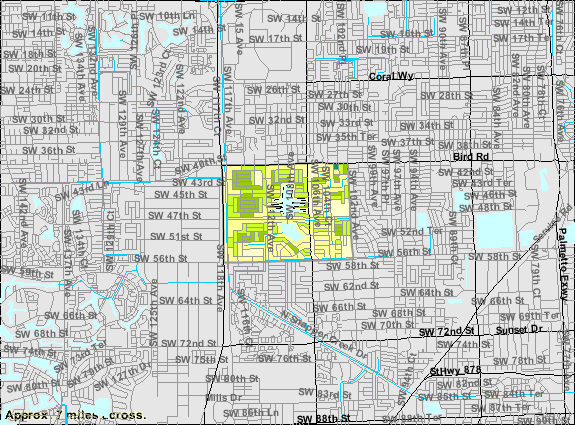
- U.S. Census Bureau map showing CDP boundaries
- Coordinates: 25°43′25″N 80°22′28″W
- Country: United States
- State: Florida
- County: Miami-Dade

Area
  - Total: 1.81 sq mi (4.68 km^{2})
  - Land: 1.66 sq mi (4.29 km^{2})
  - Water: 0.15 sq mi (0.38 km^{2})
- Elevation: 0 ft (0 m)

Population (2020)
  - Total: 11,373
  - Density: 6,859/sq mi (2,648.2/km^{2})
- Time zone: UTC-5 (Eastern (EST))
  - Summer (DST): UTC-4 (EDT)
- ZIP Code: 33165 (Miami)
- Area codes: 305, 786, 645
- FIPS code: 12-77075
- GNIS feature ID: 2403018

Westwood Lakes is a census-designated place and unincorporated community of Miami-Dade County, Florida, United States. It is part of the Miami metropolitan area of South Florida. The population was 11,373 at the 2020 census.

== Geography ==
Westwood Lakes is located 13 miles (21 km) west of downtown Miami. It is bordered to the north by Westchester, to the east by Olympia Heights, to the south by Sunset, and to the west by Kendale Lakes.

According to the United States Census Bureau, the CDP has a total area of 1.8 square miles (4.7 km^{2}), of which 1.7 square miles (4.4 km^{2}) are land and 0.1 square miles (0.26 km^{2}), or 8.14%, are water.

== Demographics ==
Historical population
Census	Pop.	Note	%±
1960	22,517		—
1970	12,811		−43.1%
1980	11,478		−10.4%
1990	11,522		0.4%
2000	12,005		4.2%
2010	11,838		−1.4%
2020	11,373		−3.9%

=== Racial and ethnic composition ===
Westwood Lakes CDP, Florida – Racial and ethnic composition Note: the US Census treats Hispanic/Latino as an ethnic category. This table excludes Latinos from the racial categories and assigns them to a separate category. Hispanics/Latinos may be of any race.
Race / Ethnicity (NH = Non-Hispanic)	Pop 2010	Pop 2020	% 2010	% 2020
White (NH)	1,483	1,132	12.53%	9.95%
Black or African American (NH)	28	34	0.24%	0.30%
Native American or Alaska Native (NH)	3	1	0.03%	0.01%
Asian (NH)	115	103	0.97%	0.91%
Pacific Islander or Native Hawaiian (NH)	0	1	0.00%	0.01%
Some other race (NH)	9	17	0.08%	0.15%
Mixed race or Multiracial (NH)	23	60	0.19%	0.53%
Hispanic or Latino (any race)	10,177	10,025	85.97%	88.15%
Total	11,838	11,373	100.00%	100.00%

=== 2020 census ===
As of the 2020 census, Westwood Lakes had a population of 11,373. The median age was 46.8 years. 16.6% of residents were under the age of 18 and 22.8% of residents were 65 years of age or older. For every 100 females there were 93.7 males, and for every 100 females age 18 and over there were 90.3 males age 18 and over.

100.0% of residents lived in urban areas, while 0.0% lived in rural areas.

There were 3,380 households in Westwood Lakes, of which 32.6% had children under the age of 18 living in them. Of all households, 51.4% were married-couple households, 14.6% were households with a male householder and no spouse or partner present, and 26.5% were households with a female householder and no spouse or partner present. About 14.2% of all households were made up of individuals and 8.0% had someone living alone who was 65 years of age or older.

There were 3,502 housing units, of which 3.5% were vacant. The homeowner vacancy rate was 1.0% and the rental vacancy rate was 5.2%.

The 2020 ACS 5-year estimates reported 2,451 families residing in the CDP.

=== 2010 census ===
As of the 2010 United States census, there were 11,838 people, 3,344 households, and 2,850 families residing in the CDP.

=== 2000 census ===
As of the census of 2000, there were 12,005 people, 3,477 households, and 2,969 families residing in the CDP. The population density was 6,967.5 inhabitants per square mile (2,690.2/km^{2}). There were 3,524 housing units at an average density of 2,045.3 per square mile (789.7/km^{2}). The racial makeup of the CDP was 92.95% White (22% were Non-Hispanic White), 0.79% African American, 0.09% Native American, 1.07% Asian, 2.87% from other races, and 2.22% from two or more races. Hispanic or Latino of any race were 76.33% of the population.

As of 2000, there were 3,477 households, out of which 33.6% had children under the age of 18 living with them, 65.5% were married couples living together, 15.0% had a female householder with no husband present, and 14.6% were non-families. 10.8% of all households were made up of individuals, and 5.4% had someone living alone who was 65 years of age or older. The average household size was 3.41 and the average family size was 3.54.

In 2000, in the CDP, the population was spread out, with 21.1% under the age of 18, 7.7% from 18 to 24, 28.8% from 25 to 44, 25.3% from 45 to 64, and 17.0% who were 65 years of age or older. The median age was 39 years. For every 100 females, there were 92.0 males. For every 100 females age 18 and over, there were 89.4 males.

In 2000, the median income for a household in the CDP was $44,602, and the median income for a family was $46,262. Males had a median income of $27,416 versus $24,896 for females. The per capita income for the CDP was $16,044. About 7.4% of families and 9.6% of the population were below the poverty line, including 12.7% of those under age 18 and 10.3% of those age 65 or over.

As of 2000, speakers of Spanish as a first language accounted for 79.96% of residents, and English was the primary language of 20.03% of the population.

== Education ==
Miami-Dade County Public Schools operates public schools in Westwood Lakes.

=== Elementary schools ===
- Royal Palm Elementary School
- Tropical Elementary School

=== Middle School ===
- Riviera Middle School

=== K-8 School ===
- Cypress K-8 Center.

=== Private School ===
St. Timothy Parish School of the Roman Catholic Archdiocese of Miami
