= Florida State Road 948 =

State highway in Florida, United States

State Road 948
- Northwest 36th Street / Doral Boulevard
- SR 948 highlighted in red

Route information
- Maintained by FDOT
- Length: 3.998 mi (6.434 km)
- Existed: mid-1980s–present

Major junctions
- West end: SR 826 near Doral
- East end: US 27 in Hialeah

Location
- Country: United States
- State: Florida
- Counties: Miami-Dade

Highway system
- Florida State Highway System; Interstate; US; State; Former; Pre‑1945; Toll; Scenic
← SR 944	→ SR 949

Locally known as Northwest 36th Street and Doral Boulevard, the 3.998-mile-long (6.434 km) State Road 948 (SR 948) is a commercially important east–west highway in central Miami-Dade County, Florida. Its western terminus is a cloverleaf interchange with the Palmetto Expressway (SR 826) in Doral; its eastern terminus is an intersection with US 27 just east of LeJeune Road (SR 953) in the southern tip of Hialeah, just outside the city limits of Miami. Some maps incorrectly indicate a continuation of SR 948 to the east of the intersection with US 27. State Road 948 serves as a primary access for the cities of Miami Springs and Virginia Gardens and a maintenance and business access for Miami International Airport.

== Route description ==
To the west of the SR 948 western terminus extends Doral Boulevard, which changes from Northwest 36th Street to Northwest 41st Street as it travels along the southern boundary of Doral Country Club and Golf Course and crosses the city of Doral. The western terminus of Doral Boulevard/North 41st Street is a dead-end just to the west of West 147th Avenue, three miles (5 km) to the west of its interchange with Florida's Turnpike (SR 821). East of the Turnpike, Doral Boulevard is dominated by shopping centers as much is SR 948; to the west, Northwest 41st Street is primary an access road for limestone quarries and the wells that supply Miami-Dade County its drinking water.

== History ==
As the Dolphin Expressway (SR 836) has become increasingly congested with commuter traffic, SR 948—a much older road—has become (with LeJeune Road) a primary access route to the passenger terminals of the airport, and, as a result, is reaching its carrying capacity on a regular basis. Since the opening of the Dolphin Expressway in 1969, several proposals for creating an SR 948 expressway have been floated to the Florida Department of Transportation and the Miami-Dade County Commission only to be rejected each time.

The current configuration of SR 948 received its number in the mid-1980s, after the designation was removed from a section of North 119th Street in North Miami (now part of SR 924) as a part of a collection of renumberings of Miami-Dade State Roads. Prior to the redesignation, North 36th Street between the Palmetto Expressway and US 27 was State Road 834 (the SR 834 designation was subsequently applied to Sample Road in Broward County).

== Major intersections ==
The entire route is in Miami-Dade County.

Location	mi	km	Destinations	Notes
Doral	0.000	0.000	west end of state maintenance	
	0.13	0.21	SR 826 to I-75 – Airport	interchange
	0.638	1.027	SR 969 (Milam Dairy Road / Northwest 72nd Avenue)	
Miami Springs	3.705	5.963	SR 953 (Le Jeune Road) to SR 836 – Airport, Rental Car Center, Cell Phone Lot	no left turn from either direction of SR 948 (signs point via Coolidge Drive and South Royal Poinciana Boulevard)
Miami Springs–Hialeah line	3.9	6.3	SR 112 east to I-95	eastbound exit and westbound entrance
Hialeah	3.998	6.434	US 27 south (Northwest 36th Street / SR 25)	
1.000 mi = 1.609 km; 1.000 km = 0.621 mi: Incomplete access
