= Sunset, Florida =

- Census-designated place
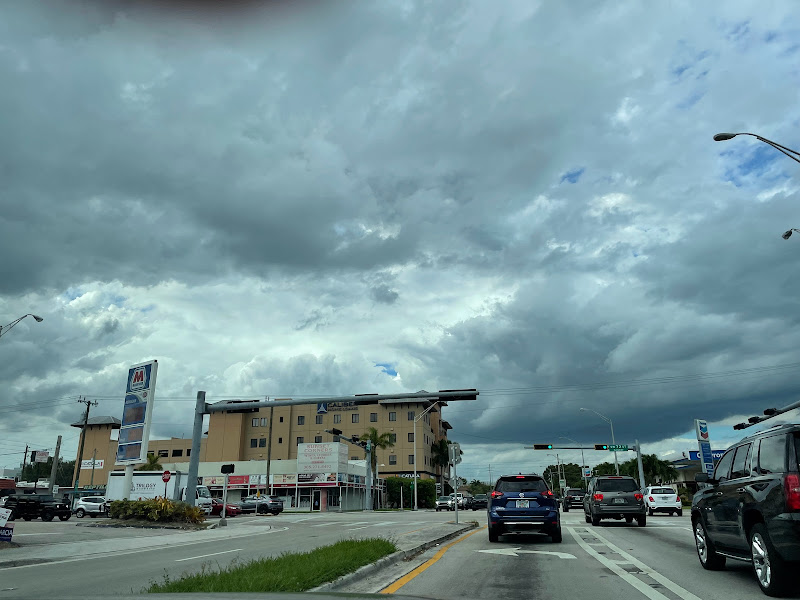
- View from Sunset Drive

- Location in Miami-Dade County and the state of Florida

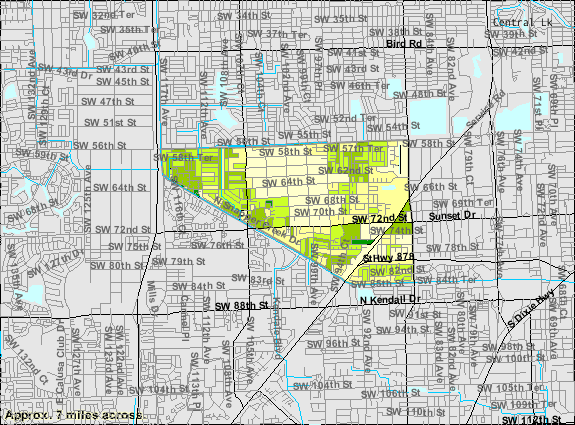
- U.S. Census Bureau map showing CDP boundaries
- Coordinates: 25°42′32″N 80°21′33″W
- Country: United States
- State: Florida
- County: Miami-Dade

Area
  - Total: 3.56 sq mi (9.22 km^{2})
  - Land: 3.51 sq mi (9.09 km^{2})
  - Water: 0.046 sq mi (0.12 km^{2})
- Elevation: 7 ft (2.1 m)

Population (2020)
  - Total: 15,912
  - Density: 4,533.1/sq mi (1,750.25/km^{2})
- Time zone: UTC-5 (Eastern (EST))
  - Summer (DST): UTC-4 (EDT)
- ZIP codes: 33173, 33183 (Miami)
- Area codes: 305, 786, 645
- FIPS code: 12-69812
- GNIS feature ID: 2402902

Sunset is a census-designated place (CDP) in Miami-Dade County, Florida, United States. It is part of the Miami metropolitan area of South Florida. The population was 15,912 at the 2020 census. The U.S. Postal Service uses the ZIP Codes of 33173 and 33183 for Sunset.

== Geography ==
The community is located 11 miles (18 km) southwest of downtown Miami. It is bordered by the communities of Kendale Lakes, Westwood Lakes, Olympia Heights, Glenvar Heights, and Kendall.

According to the United States Census Bureau, the Sunset CDP has a total area of 3.6 square miles (9.3 km^{2}), of which 0.05 square miles (0.13 km^{2}), or 1.35%, are water.

== Demographics ==
Historical population
Census	Pop.	Note	%±
1980	13,531		—
1990	15,810		16.8%
2000	17,150		8.5%
2010	16,389		−4.4%
2020	15,912		−2.9%

=== Racial and ethnic composition ===
Sunset CDP, Florida – Racial and ethnic composition Note: the US Census treats Hispanic/Latino as an ethnic category. This table excludes Latinos from the racial categories and assigns them to a separate category. Hispanics/Latinos may be of any race.
Race / Ethnicity (NH = Non-Hispanic)	Pop 2010	Pop 2020	% 2010	% 2020
White (NH)	2,666	2,115	16.27%	13.29%
Black or African American (NH)	109	103	0.67%	0.65%
Native American or Alaska Native (NH)	2	3	0.01%	0.02%
Asian (NH)	315	292	1.92%	1.84%
Pacific Islander or Native Hawaiian (NH)	0	5	0.00%	0.03%
Some other race (NH)	36	33	0.22%	0.21%
Mixed race or Multiracial (NH)	97	185	0.59%	1.16%
Hispanic or Latino (any race)	13,164	13,176	80.32%	82.81%
Total	16,389	15,912	100.00%	100.00%

=== 2020 census ===
As of the 2020 census, Sunset had a population of 15,912. The median age was 45.7 years. 18.4% of residents were under the age of 18 and 21.9% of residents were 65 years of age or older. For every 100 females there were 89.2 males, and for every 100 females age 18 and over there were 85.5 males age 18 and over.

100.0% of residents lived in urban areas, while 0.0% lived in rural areas.

There were 5,486 households in Sunset, of which 32.2% had children under the age of 18 living in them. Of all households, 56.2% were married-couple households, 11.5% were households with a male householder and no spouse or partner present, and 25.9% were households with a female householder and no spouse or partner present. About 15.9% of all households were made up of individuals and 8.4% had someone living alone who was 65 years of age or older.

There were 5,620 housing units, of which 2.4% were vacant. The homeowner vacancy rate was 0.2% and the rental vacancy rate was 3.8%.

According to the 2020 ACS 5-year estimates, there were 3,754 families residing in the CDP.

=== 2010 census ===
As of the 2010 United States census, there were 16,389 people, 5,121 households, and 4,023 families residing in the CDP.

=== 2000 census ===
As of the census of 2000, there were 17,150 people, 5,488 households, and 4,505 families residing in the CDP. The population density was 4,820.6 inhabitants per square mile (1,861.2/km^{2}). There were 5,608 housing units at an average density of 1,576.3 per square mile (608.6/km^{2}). The racial makeup of the CDP was 91.24% White (26.1% Non-Hispanic White), 1.51% African American, 0.11% Native American, 2.45% Asian, 2.49% from other races, and 2.20% from two or more races. Hispanic or Latino of any race were 69.69% of the population.

As of 2000, there were 5,488 households, out of which 36.8% had children under the age of 18 living with them, 63.9% were married couples living together, 14.0% had a female householder with no husband present, and 17.9% were non-families. 12.7% of all households were made up of individuals, and 4.3% had someone living alone who was 65 years of age or older. The average household size was 3.10 and the average family size was 3.38.

In 2000, in the CDP, the population was spread out, with 23.3% under the age of 18, 9.0% from 18 to 24, 29.6% from 25 to 44, 24.6% from 45 to 64, and 13.5% who were 65 years of age or older. The median age was 38 years. For every 100 females, there were 91.4 males. For every 100 females age 18 and over, there were 86.4 males.

In 2000, the median income for a household in the CDP was $58,903, and the median income for a family was $66,422. Males had a median income of $39,893 versus $31,234 for females. The per capita income for the CDP was $23,735. About 5.4% of families and 7.1% of the population were below the poverty line, including 6.9% of those under age 18 and 8.2% of those age 65 or over.

As of 2000, speakers of Spanish as a first language accounted for 73.75% of residents, while English made up 24.03%, and French was the mother tongue of 0.63% of the population.

== Transportation ==
The Don Shula Expressway Toll Road and Snapper Creek Expressway run through the southeast corner of Sunset.

== Education ==
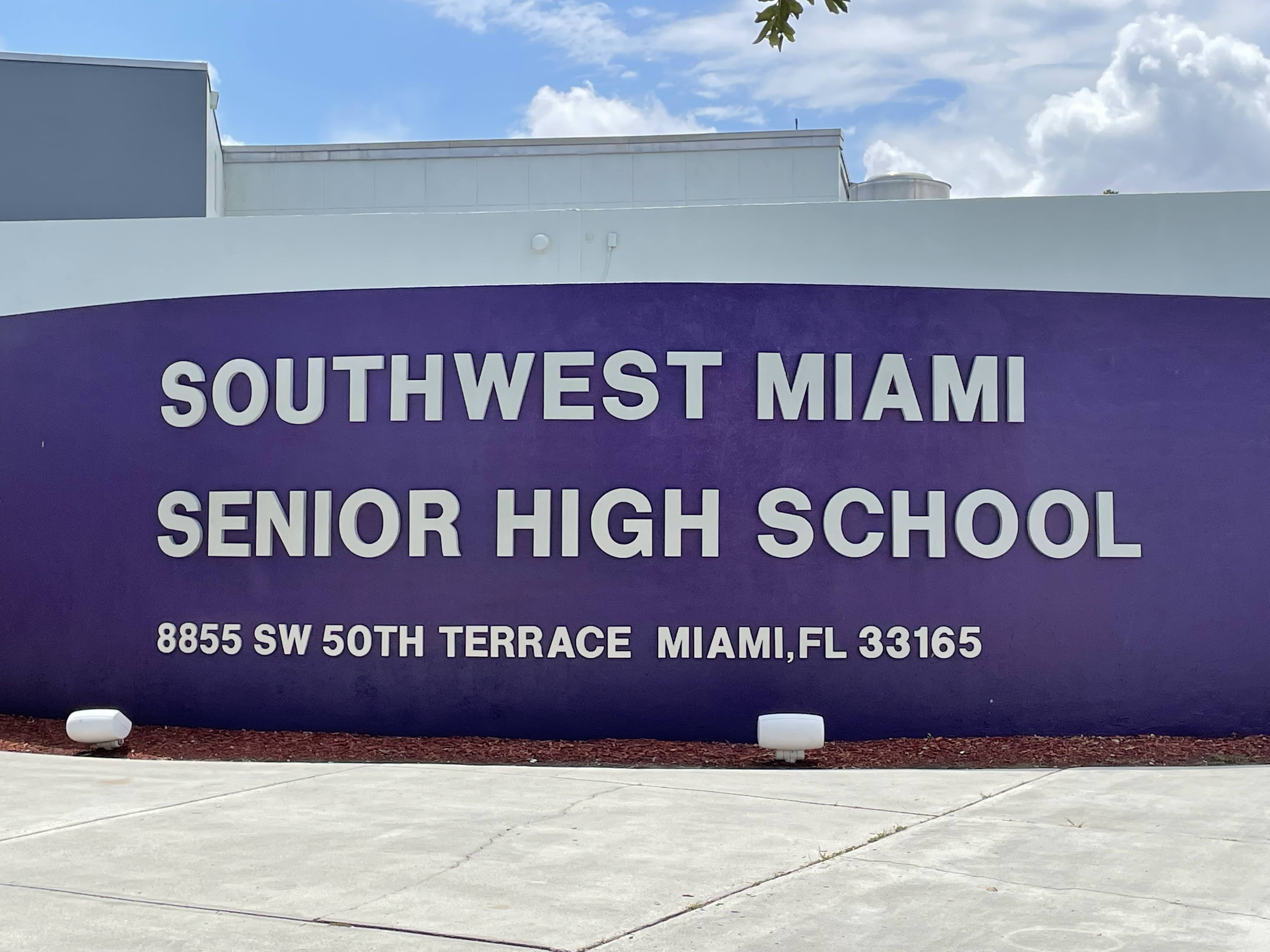
Southwest Miami Senior High School

Miami-Dade County Public Schools operates public schools.

=== Elementary schools ===
- Snapper Creek Elementary School
- Blue Lakes Elementary School

=== Middle schools ===
- Glades Middle School

=== High Schools ===
- Southwest Miami Senior High School (located in Olympia Heights)

=== Charter Schools ===
- True North Classical Academy
