= West Miami, Florida =

- City
- City of West Miami
- Flag Seal
- Motto: E Pluribus Unum
- Location in Miami-Dade County and the U.S. state of Florida

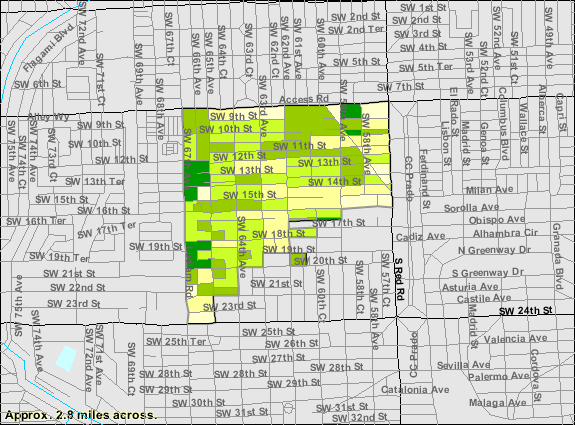
- U.S. Census Bureau map showing city limits
- Coordinates: 25°45′12″N 80°17′59″W
- Country: United States
- State: Florida
- County: Miami-Dade
- Incorporated: April 7, 1947

Government
  - Type: Council-Manager

Area
  - Total: 0.71 sq mi (1.84 km^{2})
  - Land: 0.71 sq mi (1.84 km^{2})
  - Water: 0 sq mi (0.00 km^{2})
- Elevation: 7 ft (2.1 m)

Population (2020)
  - Total: 7,233
  - Density: 10,202.3/sq mi (3,939.14/km^{2})
- Time zone: UTC-5 (Eastern (EST))
  - Summer (DST): UTC-4 (EDT)
- ZIP codes: 33144, 33155 (Miami)
- Area codes: 305, 786, 645
- FIPS code: 12-76525
- GNIS feature ID: 2405711
- Website: cityofwestmiami.gov

West Miami is a city in Miami-Dade County, Florida, United States. The city is part of the Miami metropolitan area of South Florida. The population was 7,233 at the 2020 census, up from 5,965 in 2010.

== Geography ==
West Miami is located 6 miles (10 km) west of downtown Miami. It is bordered to the north by Miami, to the east by Coral Gables, and to the south and west by unincorporated Coral Terrace.

According to the United States Census Bureau, West Miami has a total area of 0.7 square miles (1.8 km^{2}), all land.

=== Surrounding areas ===
- Flagami (Miami)
- Flagami (Miami) Flagami (Miami)
- Coral Terrace Coral Gables
- Coral Terrace Coral Gables
- Coral Terrace

== History ==
The city of West Miami, which is less than three-quarters of a square mile in area, is nestled between Tamiami Trail and Coral Way. Among early suggested names for the city were West Haven and West Gate.

Incorporated as a town with 700 residents, West Miami had 7,233 residents as of the 2020 census. 88.54% of the population was Hispanic or Latino. West Miami is surrounded by its larger neighbors, Coral Gables and Miami.

== Demographics ==
Historical population
Census	Pop.	Note	%±
1950	4,043		—
1960	5,296		31.0%
1970	5,494		3.7%
1980	6,076		10.6%
1990	5,727		−5.7%
2000	5,863		2.4%
2010	5,965		1.7%
2020	7,233		21.3%
U.S. Decennial Census

=== 2020 census ===
West Miami racial composition (Hispanics excluded from racial categories) (NH = Non-Hispanic)
Race	Number	Percentage
White (NH)	600	8.30%
Black or African American (NH)	96	1.33%
Native American or Alaska Native (NH)	0	0.00%
Asian (NH)	50	0.69%
Pacific Islander or Native Hawaiian (NH)	1	0.01%
Some Other Race (NH)	22	0.30%
Two or more races/Multiracial (NH)	60	0.83%
Hispanic or Latino (any race)	6,404	88.54%
Total	7,233	100.00%

As of the 2020 census, West Miami had a population of 7,233. The median age was 41.4 years. 16.2% of residents were under the age of 18 and 19.8% of residents were 65 years of age or older. For every 100 females, there were 86.8 males, and for every 100 females age 18 and over, there were 84.7 males.

100.0% of residents lived in urban areas, while 0.0% lived in rural areas.

There were 2,847 households in West Miami, of which 29.4% had children under the age of 18 living in them. Of all households, 40.6% were married-couple households, 18.3% were households with a male householder and no spouse or partner present, and 30.9% were households with a female householder and no spouse or partner present. About 24.0% of all households were made up of individuals and 8.8% had someone living alone who was 65 years of age or older.

There were 3,292 housing units, of which 13.5% were vacant. The homeowner vacancy rate was 1.0% and the rental vacancy rate was 16.2%.

The 2020 ACS 5-year estimates reported 2,021 families residing in the city.

=== 2010 census ===
West Miami Demographics
2010 Census	West Miami	Miami-Dade County	Florida
Total population	5,965	2,496,435	18,801,310
Population, percent change, 2000 to 2010	+1.7%	+10.8%	+17.6%
Population density	8,417.6/sq mi	1,315.5/sq mi	350.6/sq mi
White or Caucasian (including White Hispanic)	95.0%	73.8%	75.0%
(Non-Hispanic White or Caucasian)	9.1%	15.4%	57.9%
Black or African-American	1.3%	18.9%	16.0%
Hispanic or Latino (of any race)	90.2%	65.0%	22.5%
Asian	0.2%	1.5%	2.4%
Native American or Native Alaskan	0.2%	0.2%	0.4%
Pacific Islander or Native Hawaiian	0.0%	0.0%	0.1%
Two or more races (Multiracial)	1.3%	2.4%	2.5%
Some Other Race	2.0%	3.2%	3.6%

As of the 2010 United States census, there were 5,965 people, 2,194 households, and 1,502 families residing in the city.

=== 2000 census ===
In 2000, 26.9% had children under the age of 18 living with them, 54.3% were married couples living together, 17.3% had a female householder with no husband present, and 23.0% were non-families. 18.3% of all households were made up of individuals, and 10.7% had someone living alone who was 65 years of age or older. The average household size was 2.80 and the average family size was 3.14.

In 2000, the city, the population was spread out, with 18.4% under the age of 18, 5.9% from 18 to 24, 27.7% from 25 to 44, 22.5% from 45 to 64, and 25.6% who were 65 years of age or older. The median age was 43 years. For every 100 females, there were 83.3 males. For every 100 females age 18 and over, there were 81.3 males.

In 2000, the median income for a household in the city was $34,910, and the median income for a family was $39,000. Males had a median income of $26,875 versus $26,013 for females. The per capita income for the city was $17,850. About 7.6% of families and 9.5% of the population were below the poverty line, including 14.3% of those under age 18 and 7.4% of those age 65 or over.

As of 2000, Spanish as a first language was at 87.39% of residents, while English spoken as the mother tongue was 12.61% of the population.

== Parks ==
- The city is home to 6 parks; Edmund P. Cooper Park, Garden Club Park, Loraine Park, Central Bark Park, El Paseo Linear Park, and the West Miami Recreation Center.

== Education ==
It is in the Miami-Dade County Public Schools school district. Sylvania Heights Elementary School is in West Miami.

Most of West Miami is zoned to Sylvania Heights ES, while a portion is zoned to Coral Terrace Elementary School. All of West Miami is zoned to West Miami Middle School (not in the city limits), and South Miami Senior High School.

== Notable person ==
- Marco Rubio, U.S. Secretary of State and Senator, served as West Miami city commissioner

== Crime ==
The number of violent crimes recorded by the FBI in 2003 was 22, with no homicides. The violent crime rate was 3.6 per 1,000 people.
