= Florida State Road 826 =

Highway in Florida

State Road 826
- Palmetto Expressway; North Miami Beach Boulevard
- SR 826 highlighted in red

Route information
- Maintained by FDOT
- Length: 29.937 mi (48.179 km) 24.405 miles (39.276 km) expressway section
- Existed: 1945; June 1961 (freeway)–present

Major junctions
- South end: US 1 in Pinecrest
- SR 874 in Glenvar Heights; US 41 in Westchester; SR 836 in Fontainebleau; US 27 in Hialeah Gardens; I-75 / SR 924 in Miami Lakes; Florida's Turnpike / I-95 / US 441 / SR 9 in Miami Gardens; US 1 in North Miami Beach
- East end: SR A1A in Sunny Isles Beach

Location
- Country: United States
- State: Florida
- Counties: Miami-Dade

Highway system
- Florida State Highway System; Interstate; US; State; Former; Pre‑1945; Toll; Scenic
← SR 825	→ SR 827

State Road 826 (SR 826) is a bypass route around the greater Miami area, traveling approximately 30 miles (48 km) in a northeasterly arc from U.S. Route 1 (US 1) in Pinecrest to its terminus at State Road A1A in Sunny Isles Beach. Between its southern terminus and the Golden Glades Interchange, SR 826 is known as the Palmetto Expressway, a heavily traveled freeway with portions of the road carrying in excess of 250,000 vehicles a day. Unlike many of the other non-interstate freeways in Miami-Dade County, the Palmetto Expressway is untolled. East of the interchange, SR 826 is a surface road connecting North Miami and North Miami Beach to Sunny Isles Beach over the Intracoastal Waterway.

== Route description ==
=== Palmetto Expressway ===
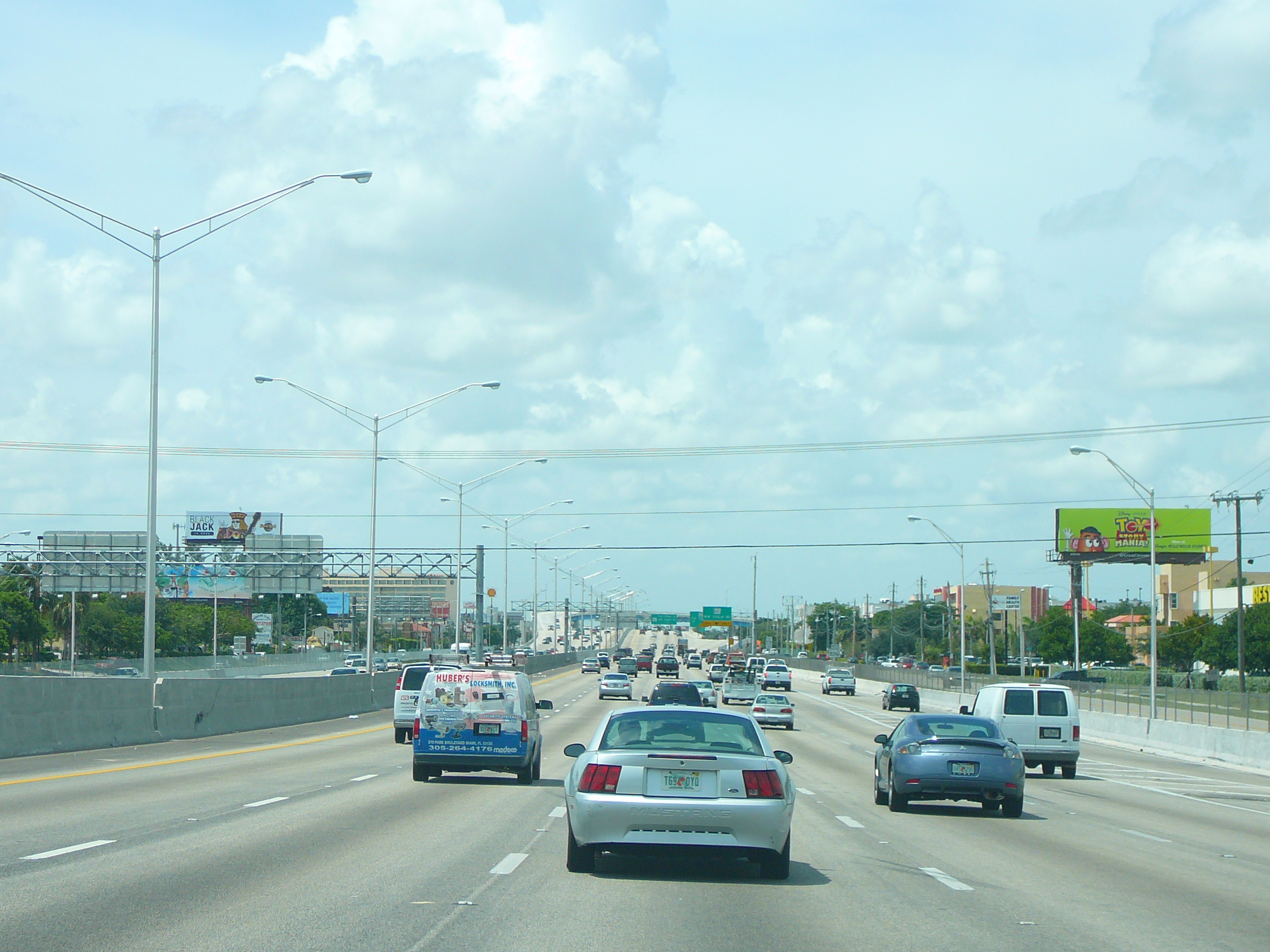
The Palmetto Expressway northbound near Hialeah in metropolitan Miami

SR 826 is signed east–west north of Miami, west of Miami it is signed north–south.

State Road 826 begins at an interchange with US 1 in Pinecrest, just south of the Dadeland South station (the handover point between the South Dade TransitWay and the Metrorail line), and heads north as the Palmetto Expressway into Kendall. The first interchange, less than a mile (1.6 km) north of US 1, is with Kendall Drive (SR 94), which provides access to the Dadeland Mall. SR 826 continues north, crossing under the Snapper Creek Expressway (SR 878) without an interchange before meeting Sunset Drive (SR 986) at a diamond interchange. It then leaves Kendall, continuing into Glenvar Heights with an interchange with Southwest 56th Street/Miller Drive, which provides access to the University of Miami. About half a mile (0.8 km) later, the Don Shula Expressway (SR 874) merges with the Palmetto Expressway at its northern terminus, with a southbound exit and a northbound entrance point. Between this interchange and the next (at Bird Road/SR 976), SR 826 forms the border between Glenvar Heights and Olympia Heights; past it, the expressway marks the boundary between Westchester and Coral Terrace. After an exit with Southwest 24th Street/Coral Way, the expressway meets the Tamiami Trail (US 41), providing access to Florida International University. This interchange also marks the Tamiami Trail's entrance into incorporated Miami, the boundary of which lies on the eastern side of the expressway.

North of the Tamiami Trail interchange, the Palmetto Expressway forms the eastern boundary of Fontainebleau as it continues north to an exit with Flagler Street (SR 968), the north–south baseline for Miami-Dade County roads. The freeway then has an interchange with the Dolphin Expressway (SR 836) just south of Doral, creating access to Miami International Airport. This interchange was recently improved in 2016 due to the previous configuration causing severe congestion. Now forming Doral's eastern boundary, SR 826 continues north to Northwest 25th Street, which connects to the western end of the airport, followed by an exit with Doral Boulevard (SR 948) that links to the Doral Golf Resort & Spa, and then an exit with Northwest 58th Street. After a brief crossing through unincorporated Miami-Dade County, the expressway reaches an interchange with the Hialeah Expressway (SR 934) in Medley, then immediately crosses over the Metrorail again adjacent to the Palmetto station, before reaching a diagonal interchange with US 27 at the southern end of Hialeah Gardens and Hialeah. It then enters Hialeah proper just after an interchange with Northwest 103rd Street (SR 932), which allows access to the Westland Mall. An exit with Northwest 122nd Street then follows.

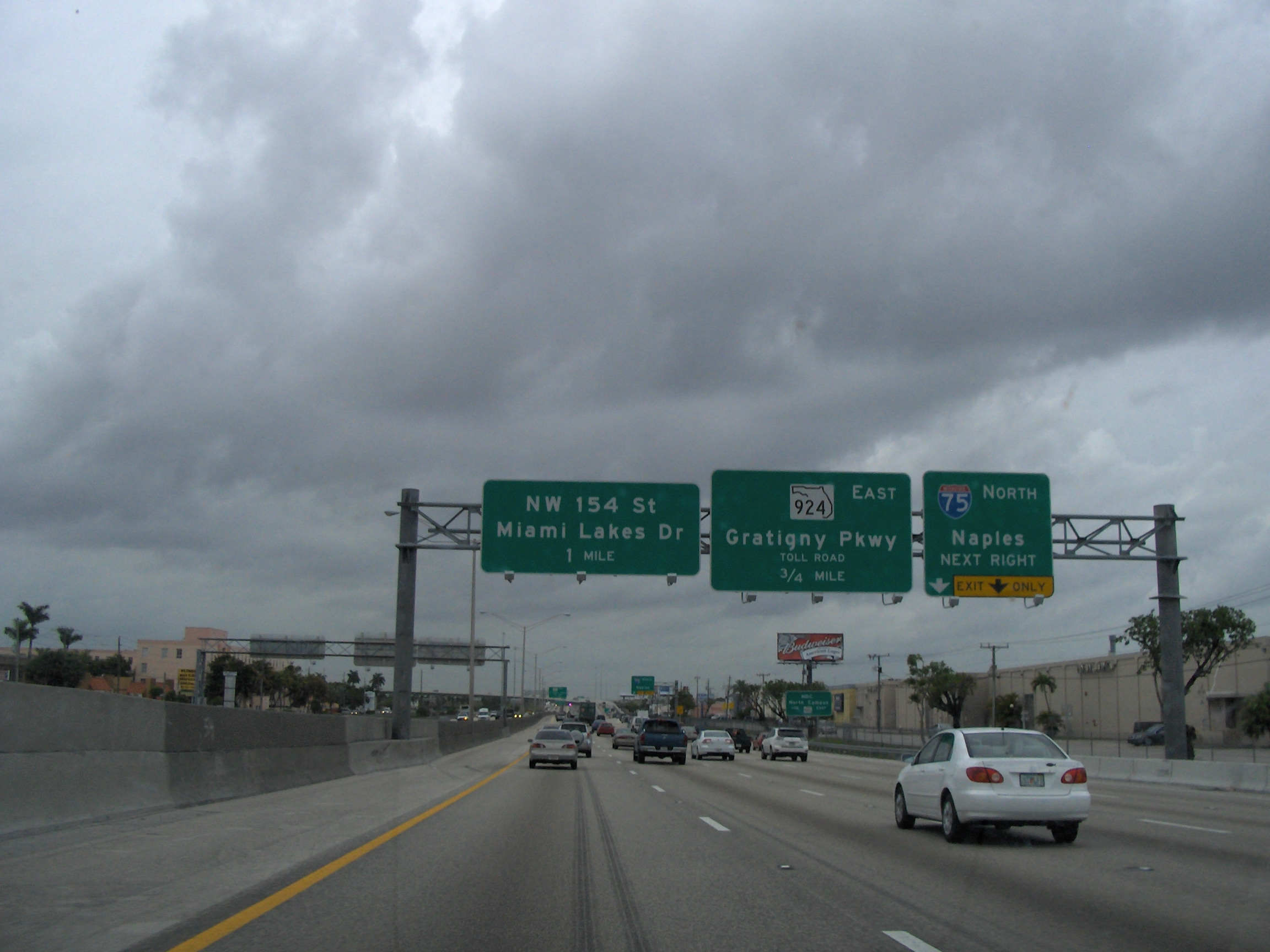
Palmetto Expressway northbound approaching the I-75/SR 924 interchange near Hialeah and Miami Lakes

At the boundary between Hialeah and Miami Lakes, SR 826 reaches an interchange with the national southern terminus of Interstate 75 (I-75) and the western termini of the Gratigny Parkway (SR 924) and SR 916. The Palmetto Expressway goes into Miami Lakes, interchanges with Northwest 154 Street, then turns through 90 degrees to the east at a point known as "The Big Curve". The road then proceeds straight east, forming the boundary between Miami Lakes and Country Club, soon interchanging with Northwest 67th Avenue. At the next exit, Red Road (SR 823), the expressway forms the boundary between an unincorporated section of Miami-Dade County and Miami Gardens, with the expressway entering the city proper at the next exit, Northwest 47th Avenue. The expressway then passes to the north of Florida Memorial University before the Northwest 37th Avenue exit, where it creates the northern border of St. Thomas University's campus. Still in Miami Gardens, SR 826 then has exits with Northwest 27th Avenue (SR 817), Northwest 17th Avenue and Northwest 12th Avenue before reaching the Golden Glades Interchange.

SR 826 takes a convoluted path through the Golden Glades Interchange. It first meets the connector ramps between Florida's Turnpike and Interstate 95 (I-95), allowing access from northbound SR 826 to I-95 southbound as well as US 441/SR 9 southbound, and from the Turnpike southbound and I-95 northbound to southbound SR 826. After turning to the northeast, SR 826 moves off its mainline at the next exit onto the mainline of the Turnpike which passes over it; SR 826's former mainline, meanwhile, continues on as an at-grade extension of Northwest 7th Avenue to US 441 northbound. Traffic moving from eastbound SR 826 to the northbound Turnpike must pass through an unsignalised intersection here. Headed back southeast, SR 826 first crosses over the former Seaboard Coast Line railroad, begins to form the northern boundary of Golden Glades, then passes under the I-95's express lanes, meeting the onramp between I-95 southbound and the Turnpike northbound, and the onramp between southbound US 441 and eastbound SR 826. It then passes over Interstate 95 proper, which lies between the southbound and northbound carriageways of US 441, as it swings back to the northeast and then to the east once more. Here it meets its last three ramps, one which allows access from US 441 and I-95 northbound to eastbound SR 826, another from westbound SR 826 to US 441 and I-95 southbound, and from westbound SR 826 to northbound US 441. SR 826 resumes its east–west orientation once more at a signalised intersection with Northwest 2nd Avenue, marking the end of SR 826's expressway.

=== Non-expressway section ===
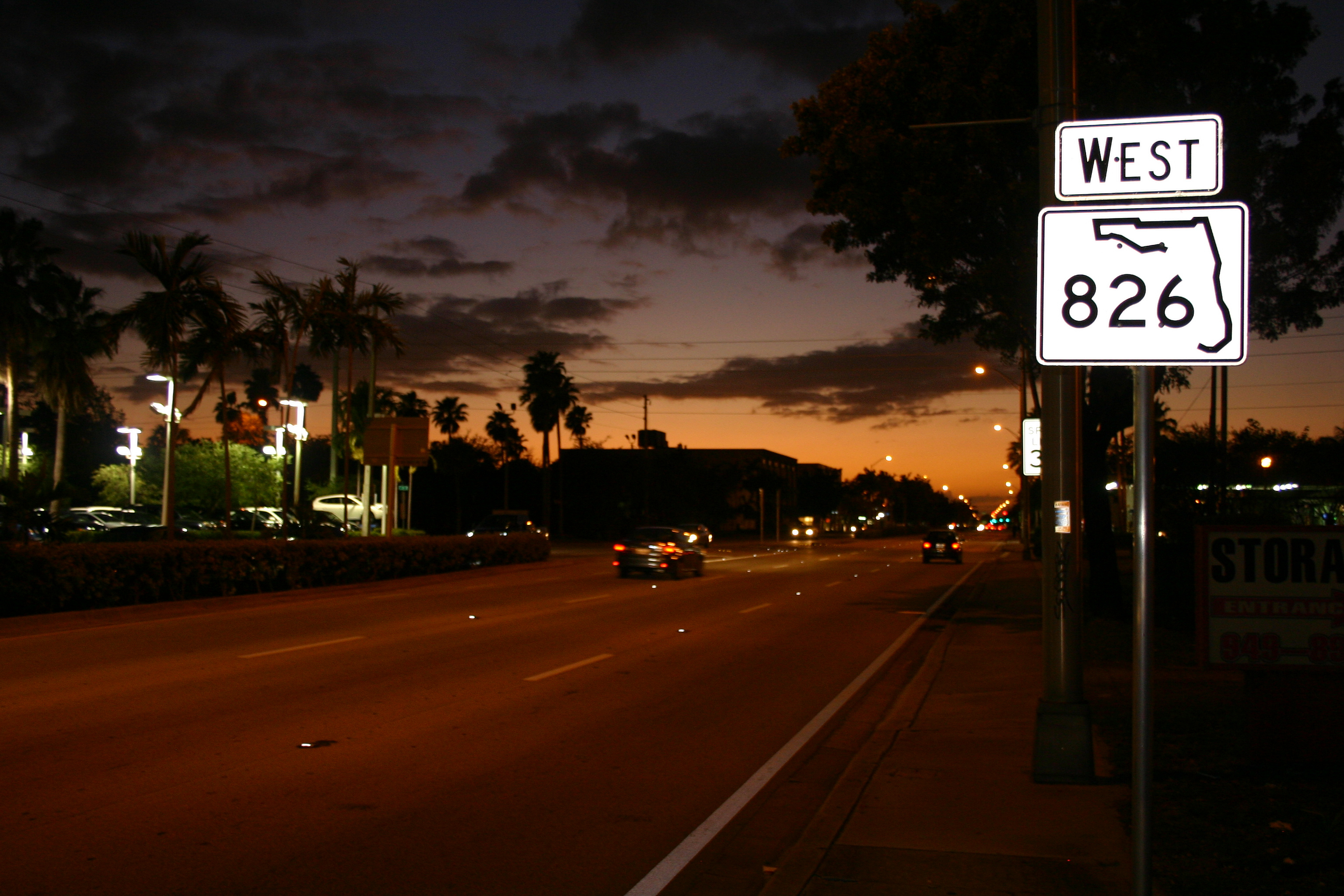
Northeast 163rd Street in North Miami Beach is also denoted as State Road 826.

State Road 826 heads east from the Golden Glades Interchange as Northwest 167th Street, a six-laned surface road, along the boundary between Golden Glades and North Miami Beach. Through here, the road is also known as North Miami Beach Boulevard, lined with shops, offices, hotels and other commercial services. Two blocks after leaving the interchange, the road crosses North Miami Avenue, the longitudinal baseline for Miami-Dade County; thus, the road becomes Northeast 167th Street once it passes this point. Approximately 0.75 miles (1.21 km) later, SR 826 intersects with Northeast 6th Avenue (SR 915). Two blocks later, at Northeast 8th Avenue, North Miami Beach Boulevard starts to swing to the southeast, leaving Northeast 167th Street's orientation, reaching Northeast 163rd street approximately 0.6 miles (0.97 km) later at Northeast 12th Avenue, and taking its eastbound orientation. It immediately passes the Mall at 163rd Street on its left, continuing on as a shopping strip for another 1.25 miles (2.01 km) where it meets the northern terminus of SR 909 at the West Dixie Highway. One block later, after crossing the Florida East Coast Railway tracks, SR 826 meets US 1 once more at Biscayne Boulevard.

To the east of US 1, SR 826's character changes as it passes through mangroves and crosses the Oleta River, having expanded to eight lanes. With North Miami Beach lying to the north and North Miami to the south of the road, SR 826 passes between more mangroves to its south and more businesses to the north as it approaches the Intracoastal Waterway. Here, the road splits into separate eastbound and westbound streets before it crosses the Waterway over a drawbridge in each direction, and enters Sunny Isles Beach. Apartment buildings line the outside of the two road-halves, with some commercial services in the middle, as it continues on for another 0.36 miles (0.58 km) to SR 826's northern terminus at Collins Avenue (SR A1A), one block shy of the Atlantic Ocean. A flyover allows traffic on northbound SR A1A to move onto westbound SR 826 without having to stop twice for eastbound SR 826 traffic and to cross SR A1A.

=== Traffic volume ===
Traffic volume on State Road 826
Location	Volume		
Location	2008	2010	2011
SR 94 (Kendall Dr) – SR 986 (Sunset Dr)	–	–	83,500
SR 976 (SW 40th St) – Coral Way	–	–	180,500
Coral Way – US 41	–	176,500	195,500
SR 836 (Dolphin Expwy) – SR 948 (Doral Blvd)	–	219,000	–
NW 58th St – SR 934 (Hialeah Expwy)	–	254,000	–
SR 934 (Hialeah Expwy) – US 27 (Okeechobee Rd)	–	210,000	–
NW 122nd St – I-75/SR 924 (Gratigny Pkwy)	–	197,500	–
NW 154th St – NW 37th Ave	–	138,500	–
NW 12th Ave – Golden Glades Interchange	–	164,000	–
Golden Glades Interchange – SR 915 (NE 6th Ave)	64,500	–	–
NE 18th Ave – US 1	53,500	–	–
NE 35th Ave – SR A1A	46,000	–	–
Volume: Average annual daily traffic; Source: FDOT

The traffic volume along SR 826's entire length is measured by the Florida Department of Transportation. The busiest sections of SR 826 are in the vicinity of the Miami International Airport and the nearby industrial area to its west, with over 200,000 daily vehicle movements counted between the Dolphin Expressway at Fontainebleau and the Northwest 122nd Street / West 68th Street exit in Hialeah, peaking in the vicinity of SR 934 in Medley with over 250,000 vehicle movements each day.

Traffic volumes decrease to the south of the Dolphin Expressway, particularly south of the Don Shula Expressway merge; however, unlike the rest of SR 826 (including its surface road portion), much of its peak traffic flow is uni-directional. Indeed, at the Palmetto Expressway's southern end, between US 1 and Kendall Drive, traffic moves almost exclusively in the peak direction.

Northwards, traffic volumes decrease after the interchange with I-75 and the Gratigny Parkway, with a reported drop of approximately 60,000 daily vehicle movements north of the interchange. As the Palmetto Expressway rounds the Big Curve and heads eastwards, the traffic volume steadily increases to a maximum of 164,000 daily vehicle movements just prior to the Golden Glades Interchange as it collects traffic from the north–south routes in the Miami Gardens area.

East of the interchange, where SR 826 becomes a surface road, the traffic volumes are more than halved in comparison to SR 826's expressway sections, with a recorded figure of 64,500 daily vehicle movements. This figure steadily decreases eastwards along SR 826, with only 46,000 daily vehicle movements recorded near its eastern terminus with SR A1A in Sunny Isles Beach.

== History ==
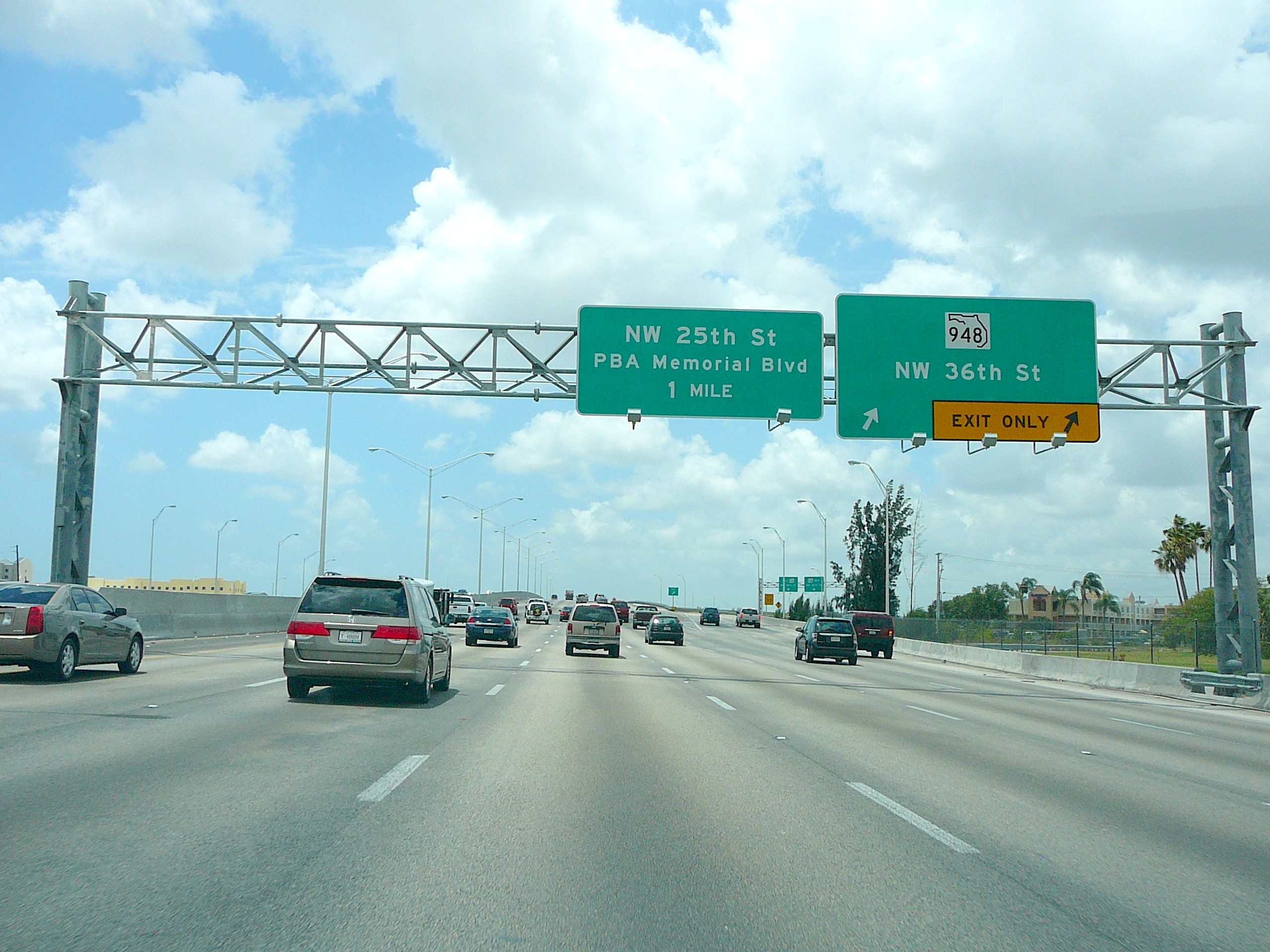
The Palmetto Expressway southbound at the SR 948 interchange near Doral

State Road 826's designation originally applied to a two-lane road (Golden Glades Drive, Northwest 167th Street) connecting US 27 to US 441 in the vicinity of the Golden Glades Interchange.

In 1956, plans were unveiled for several expressways throughout Dade County. The routes proposed were a North-South Expressway (now part of I-95), an East-West Expressway (now the Dolphin Expressway), a 36th Street Expressway (now the Airport Expressway), the Biscayne Bay Malecon (a proposed bridge from Brickell to Elliot Key and North Key Largo, never built), a Dixie Expressway (proposed; most was never built, a portion became I-95), and the Palmetto Road Expressway. In 1957, Dade County Commissioner Ralph Fossey proposed an alternative alignment of the Palmetto Expressway. The new alignment would begin at Miller Road (Southwest 56th Street) and then turn southwesterly to follow the Seaboard Coast Line railroad tracks for about 10 miles (16 km). The route would then turn south at Southwest 117th Avenue and follow it into US 1. While the alternate route plan ultimately failed, eventually the Don Shula Expressway, a northeast–southwest expressway, was built along the railroad tracks in the 1970s.

In 1958, the State Road Department started construction on the bypass expressway under their authority. A north–south section along West 77th Avenue (Palmetto Road) was built to connect US 1 in Pinecrest to an improved Golden Glades Drive (complete with 90 degree eastward turn) and the portion of Northwest 167th Street west of the curve would be abandoned. Many land owners were forced to sell their property to the county to make way for the construction of the expressway. The Palmetto Expressway was opened in June 1961 at the cost of $30 million, four years after the opening of Florida's Turnpike and six months before the opening of Dade County's second expressway, the Airport Expressway (SR 112).

The completion of the Palmetto Expressway (the "Bypass" faded from public usage in the 1960s) and the building of Interstate 95 were the impetus of the construction of the massive Golden Glades Interchange involving Florida's Turnpike, US 441, Interstate 95, and SR 9.

When the Palmetto Expressway was first opened, it went through tracts of woodland and farmland which have since been urbanized. Originally there were four at-grade intersections in Hialeah and Miami Lakes which were either transformed into full interchanges or blocked off in the 1970s. In addition, increasing traffic loads on the Palmetto prompted plans for extending Florida's Turnpike to "bypass the bypass." In 1974, the Homestead Extension of Florida's Turnpike was opened to traffic four miles (6.4 km) to the west of the Palmetto to reduce the traffic demands on Miami's original bypass.

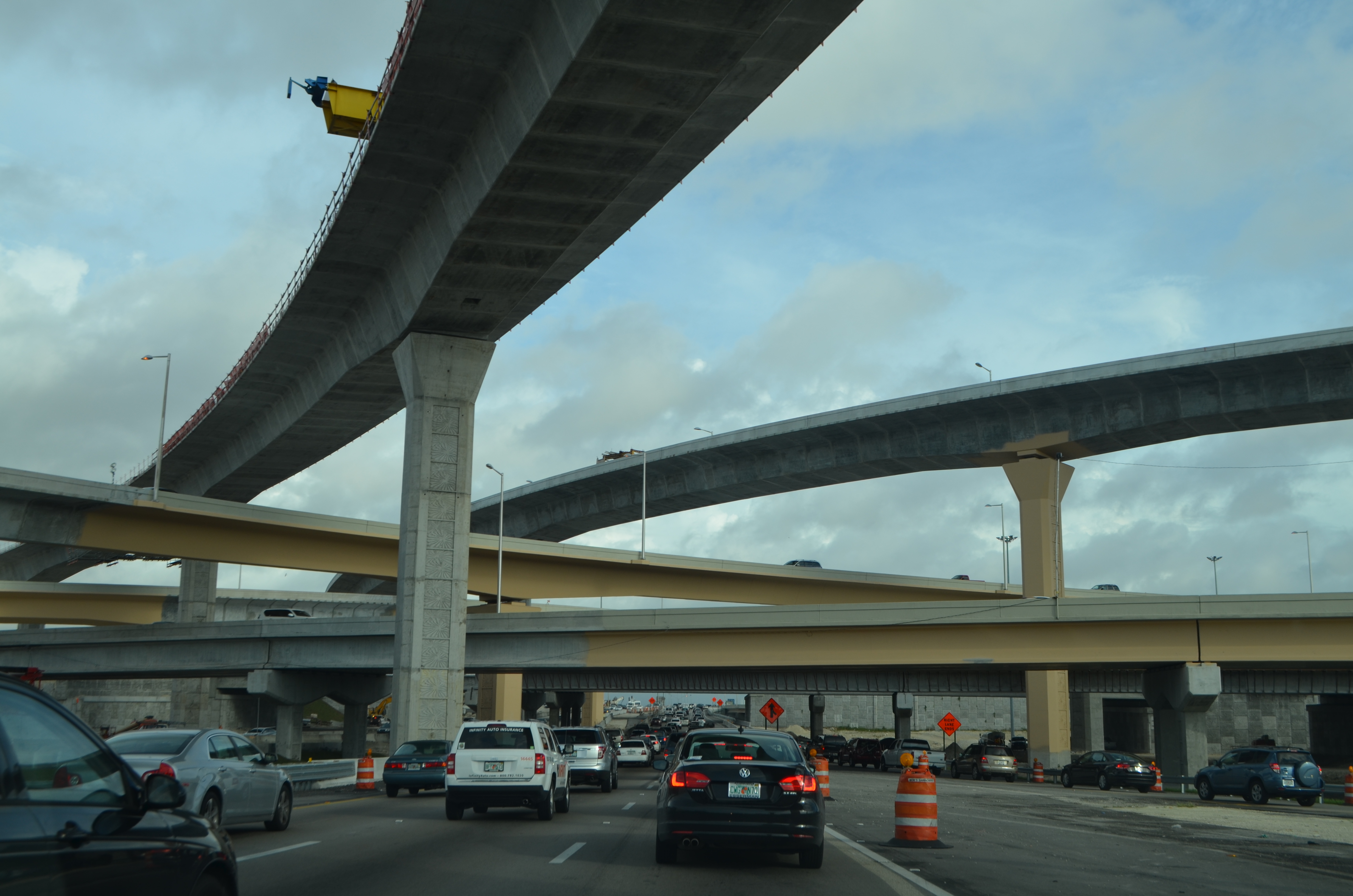
The Dolphin-Palmetto Interchange in 2014 with the main flyover ramps just being completed.

The Florida Department of Transportation recently completed a project on a 16.7-mile-long (26.9 km) section of the Palmetto Expressway from the southern terminus to just north of the Northwest 154th Street interchange, widening the highway by two lanes (from eight lanes to ten and ten lanes to twelve) and improving the interchanges. Reconstruction of the Miller Drive, Bird Road and Don Shula Expressway interchanges began in 2008, and was completed around 2012. The Dolphin-Palmetto Interchange construction began on November 30, 2009, and was completed in late 2016.

The Florida Department of Transportation is in the process of adding express lanes on the Palmetto Expressway between West Flagler Street and Northwest 154th Street, which will connect with new express lanes on Interstate 75. This will result in four regular and two express lanes, similar to 95 express. These express lanes were completed in 2019.

== Exit list ==
The entire route is in Miami-Dade County. All exits are unnumbered.

Location	mi	km	Destinations	Notes
Pinecrest–Kendall line	0.000	0.000	US 1 south (SR 5)	Southern terminus; Southbound exit and northbound entrance
Kendall	0.858	1.381	SR 94 (Southwest 88th Street / North Kendall Drive) / Dadeland Mall Circle – Metrorail	Access to Baptist Hospital of Miami, Baptist Children's Hospital, and Dadeland Mall. No southbound access from SR 94 west.
Glenvar Heights	1.857	2.989	SR 986 (Southwest 72nd Street / Sunset Drive)	Access to South Miami Hospital and Larkin Community Hospital
Glenvar Heights	2.876	4.628	Southwest 56th Street / Miller Drive	To University of Miami
Glenvar Heights	3.412	5.491	SR 874 south (Don Shula Expressway) to Florida's Turnpike Extension south	Southbound exit and northbound entrance; Northern terminus of SR 874
Westchester–Coral Terrace– Glenvar Heights tripoint	3.932	6.328	SR 976 (Southwest 40th Street / Bird Road)	
Westchester–Coral Terrace line	4.984	8.021	Southwest 24th Street / Coral Way	Access to Westchester General Hospital and Nicklaus Children's Hospital; former SR 972
Westchester–Coral Terrace– Fontainebleau tripoint	5.977	9.619	US 41 (Southwest 8th Street / Tamiami Trail / SR 90)	
Fontainebleau	6.491	10.446	SR 968 (West Flagler Street)	
Fontainebleau–Doral line	6.491	10.446	SR 969 (Northwest 72nd Avenue / Milam Dairy Road) / SR 973 (Northwest 87th Avenue / Galloway Road)	Shares an exit ramp northbound with SR 968; SR 973 signed southbound only
Fontainebleau–Doral line	7.230	11.636	SR 836 (Dolphin Expressway) to Florida's Turnpike Extension – Miami International Airport	
Doral	8.372	13.473	Northwest 25th Street / PBA Memorial Boulevard	Access to Jackson West Medical Center
Doral	9.216	14.832	SR 948 (Northwest 36th Street) – Miami International Airport	Western terminus of SR 948
Doral	10.381	16.707	Northwest 58th Street	
Medley	11.383	18.319	SR 934 (Northwest 74th Street / Hialeah Expressway) / Metrorail	Western terminus of SR 934
Medley–Hialeah– Hialeah Gardens tripoint	12.310	19.811	US 27 (Okeechobee Road / SR 25) / South River Drive	
Hialeah–Hialeah Gardens line	13.173	21.200	SR 932 (Northwest 103rd Street)	Access to Palm Springs General Hospital, MDC Hialeah, and Westland Mall
Hialeah	14.374	23.133	Northwest 122nd Street	Access to Palmetto General Hospital
Hialeah–Miami Lakes line	15.379	24.750	SR 916 (Northwest 138th Street)	Southbound exit and northbound entrance (other movements are made by using frontage roads from Northwest 122nd Street)
Miami Lakes	15.52	24.98	I-75 north (SR 93) / SR 924 east (Gratigny Parkway) – Naples	I-75 exit 1; southern terminus of I-75; western terminus of SR 924
Miami Lakes	16.393	26.382	Northwest 154th Street / Miami Lakes Drive	
Miami Lakes	18.006	28.978	Ludlam Road / Northwest 67th Avenue	
Miami Lakes–Miami Gardens line	19.016	30.603	SR 823 (Red Road / Northwest 57th Avenue)	
Miami Gardens	20.047	32.263	Northwest 47th Avenue	
Miami Gardens	21.048	33.873	Northwest 37th Avenue / Douglas Road	
Miami Gardens	22.052	35.489	SR 817 (Northwest 27th Avenue) / Northwest 22nd Avenue	To Hard Rock Stadium and Calder Casino
Miami Gardens	23.060	37.111	Northwest 17th Avenue / Northwest 22nd Avenue	
Miami Gardens	23.485	37.795	NW 12th Avenue	Westbound exit only; permanent closure of eastbound entrance on June 4th, 2025; (other movements are made by using frontage roads from Northwest 17th Avenue)
Miami Gardens	24.24	39.01	I-95 (SR 9 north / SR 9A south) / US 441 (SR 7) / SR 9 south / Florida's Turnpike north (SR 91) to Florida's Turnpike Extension – West Palm Beach, Miami, Orlando	Golden Glades Interchange (I-95 exit 12); no access from SR 826 east to SR 9 south
North Miami Beach	24.684	39.725	Northwest 2nd Avenue to I-95 north	East end of freeway
North Miami Beach	25.687	41.339	SR 915 (Northeast 6th Avenue)	
North Miami Beach	27.778	44.704	SR 909 south (West Dixie Highway / Northeast 22nd Avenue) – Ancient Spanish Monastery	Northern terminus of SR 909
North Miami Beach–North Miami line	27.905	44.909	US 1 (Biscayne Boulevard / SR 5) – FIU Biscayne Bay Campus	
	29.310– 29.574	47.170– 47.595	Sunny Isles Causeway over Intracoastal Waterway	
Sunny Isles Beach	29.937	48.179	SR A1A (Collins Avenue)	flyover from SR A1A north to SR 826 west
1.000 mi = 1.609 km; 1.000 km = 0.621 mi: Incomplete access

=== Express lanes ===
Express lanes are all located in Miami-Dade County. The entire route is in Miami-Dade County. All exits are unnumbered.

Location	mi	km	Destinations	Notes
Fontainebleau–Doral line			SR 826 south to (Southwest 24th Street)	Southern terminus of Palmetto express lanes; Northbound entrance and southbound merges with mainline; travelers access Southwest 24th Street beyond this point.
Doral			Northwest 25th Street / SR 836 – Miami International Airport / SR 968 (West Flagler Street)	Southbound exit via local lanes
Medley–Hialeah– Hialeah Gardens tripoint			SR 934 (Northwest 74th Street / Hialeah Expressway)	Southbound exit and northbound entrance; Access via local lanes
Hialeah			Northwest 122nd Street	Northbound exit and southbound entrance; Access via local lanes
Hialeah			I-75 Express north to SR 860 (Northwest 186th Street / Miami Gardens Drive) /	Express Lanes continue to SR-860 (Miami Gardens Drive) via I-75 Express North; Northern terminus of Palmetto Express
Miami Lakes			Northwest 154th Street / Miami Lakes Drive to SR 826 south / (Express Lanes)	Southbound entrance only; Slip lane that connects to southbound express lanes after I-75 interchange
1.000 mi = 1.609 km; 1.000 km = 0.621 mi: Incomplete access

== Related Routes ==
=== State Road 826F ===
State Road 826F
- Location: Miami Gardens; Country Club; Miami Lakes
- Length: 13 mi (21 km)

State Road 826F is the designation given to the frontage roads that run parallel to the Palmetto Expressway between Miami Gardens and Miami Lakes. These roads consist of Northwest 167th Street, running on both sides of the east-west portion of the freeway, and Northwest 77th Avenue, running on the northbound side of the north-south portion of the freeway. The combined one-way streets run a total of 13 miles (21 km).

=== State Road 833 ===
State Road 833
- Location: Miami Lakes
- Length: 0.785 mi (1,263 m)

State Road 833 is a frontage road for the Palmetto Expressway that runs to the east of the freeway in Miami Lakes. Known as Northwest 77th Street, the state road runs from Miami Lakes Drive for 0.785 miles (1.263 km) before turning east and continuing as a local street. It is not contiguous with any other state highway.

Browse numbered routes
← SR 827	SR 833	→ SR 834

=== State Road 843 ===
State Road 843
- Location: Hialeah Gardens
- Length: 0.173 mi (278 m)

State Road 843 is a connector street running west of the Palmetto Expressway linking Northwest 103rd Street (SR 932) to the freeway's frontage road, Northwest 77th Avenue (SR 979), in Hialeah Gardens. It runs for 0.173 miles (0.278 km), serving Mater Academy Charter Middle/High School, and is known as Northwest 77th Court.

Browse numbered routes
← SR 842	SR 843	→ SR 844

=== State Road 863 ===
State Road 863
- Location: Hialeah
- Length: 1.065 mi (1.714 km)

State Road 863 is a frontage road running east of the Palmetto Expressway in Hialeah. Starting at SR 916 near the interchange with I-75 and the Gratigny Parkway, it runs 1.065 miles (1.714 km) until terminating at West 68th Street and the freeway's on/off ramps.

Browse numbered routes
← SR 862	SR 863	→ SR 865

=== State Road 923 ===
State Road 923
- Location: Hialeah
- Length: 1.059 mi (1.704 km)

State Road 923, known as West 20th Avenue, is a frontage road running west of the Palmetto Expressway opposite SR 863. It starts at the intersection with SR 938 and SR 918 near the interchange with I-75 and the Gratigny Parkway, running south for 1.059 miles (1.704 km) before terminating at West 68th Street near the Palmetto Expressway on/off ramps.

Browse numbered routes
← SR 922	SR 923	→ SR 924

=== State Road 929 ===
State Road 929
- Location: Hialeah
- Length: 0.801 mi (1,289 m)

State Road 929, known as West 20th Avenue, is a frontage road running east of the Palmetto Expressway opposite SR 939. It starts at Okeechobee Road (US 27/SR 25) near the freeway interchange and runs for 0.801 miles (1.289 km) before dead-ending near the northbound freeway exit ramp.

Browse numbered routes
← SR 928	SR 929	→ SR 932

=== State Road 939 ===
State Road 939
- Location: Hialeah Gardens
- Length: 1.273 mi (2.049 km)

State Road 939, known as Northwest 77th Avenue and Okeechobee Frontage Road, is a frontage road running west of the Palmetto Expressway and curving northwest to run north of Okeechobee Road (US 27/SR 25) in Hialeah Gardens. It starts at Northwest 103rd Street (SR 932) and runs for 1.273 miles (2.049 km) before terminating at a junction with Northwest 95th Street. The road continues northwest with the designation SR 25F.

Browse numbered routes
← SR 938	SR 939	→ SR 944

=== State Road 949 ===
State Road 949
- Location: Hialeah
- Length: 1.405 mi (2.261 km)

State Road 949, known as West 20th Avenue, is a frontage road running east of the Palmetto Expressway in Hialeah. The road starts at West 68th Street near the freeway interchange and continues south for 1.405 miles (2.261 km) before terminating at Northwest 103rd Street (SR 932). The road runs opposite SR 979.

Browse numbered routes
← SR 948	SR 949	→ SR 951

=== State Road 979 ===
State Road 979
- Location: Hialeah Gardens
- Length: 1.342 mi (2.160 km)

State Road 979, known as West 20th Avenue, is a frontage road running west of the Palmetto Expressway in Hialeah Gardens. The road starts at West 68th Street near the freeway interchange and continues south before terminating at Northwest 77th Court (SR 843 south). It runs a total of 1.342 miles (2.160 km) and runs opposite SR 949.

Browse numbered routes
← SR 976	SR 979	→ SR 986

=== State Road 988 ===
State Road 988
- Location: Miami Lakes
- Length: 1.099 mi (1.769 km)

State Road 988 is a frontage road running west of the Palmetto Expressway in Miami Lakes. The road starts at Miami Lakes Drive near the freeway interchange and continues north for 1.1 miles (1.8 km) as the freeway curves east, terminating at Northwest 169th Street. The road is not contiguous with any other state highway.

Browse numbered routes
← SR 986	SR 988	→ SR 989
