= Olympia Heights, Florida =

- Census-designated place
- Location in Miami-Dade County and the state of Florida

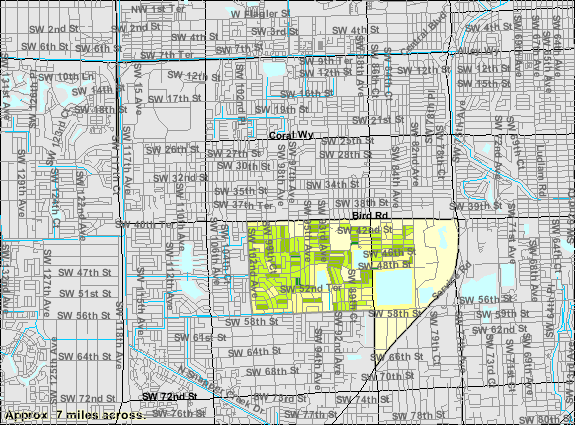
- U.S. Census Bureau map showing CDP boundaries
- Coordinates: 25°43′27″N 80°20′20″W
- Country: United States
- State: Florida
- County: Miami-Dade

Area
  - Total: 3.06 sq mi (7.92 km^{2})
  - Land: 2.71 sq mi (7.01 km^{2})
  - Water: 0.35 sq mi (0.91 km^{2})
- Elevation: 10 ft (3.0 m)

Population (2020)
  - Total: 12,873
  - Density: 4,756.9/sq mi (1,836.65/km^{2})
- Time zone: UTC-5 (Eastern (EST))
  - Summer (DST): UTC-4 (EDT)
- ZIP Code: 33165
- Area codes: 305, 786, 645
- FIPS code: 12-51475
- GNIS feature ID: 2403376

Olympia Heights is a census-designated place in Miami-Dade County, Florida, United States. It is located in the Miami metropolitan area of South Florida. The population was 12,873 at the 2020 census.

== Geography ==
Olympia Heights is located 11 miles (18 km) west-southwest of downtown Miami. It is bordered to the north by Westchester, to the northwest by Coral Terrace, to the east by Glenvar Heights, to the south by Sunset, and to the west by Westwood Lakes.

According to the United States Census Bureau, the CDP has a total area of 3.1 square miles (8.0 km^{2}), of which 2.7 square miles (7.0 km^{2}) are land and 0.4 square miles (1.0 km^{2}), or 11.51%, are water.

== Demographics ==
Historical population
| Census | Pop. | Note | %± |
|---|---|---|---|
| 1980 | 33,112 | | — |
| 1990 | 37,792 | | 14.1% |
| 2000 | 13,452 | | −64.4% |
| 2010 | 13,488 | | 0.3% |
| 2020 | 12,873 | | −4.6% |

=== Racial and ethnic composition ===
Olympia Heights CDP, Florida – Racial and ethnic composition Note: the US Census treats Hispanic/Latino as an ethnic category. This table excludes Latinos from the racial categories and assigns them to a separate category. Hispanics/Latinos may be of any race.
| Race / Ethnicity (NH = Non-Hispanic) | Pop 2010 | Pop 2020 | % 2010 | % 2020 |
|---|---|---|---|---|
| White (NH) | 1,781 | 1,274 | 13.20% | 9.90% |
| Black or African American (NH) | 25 | 47 | 0.19% | 0.37% |
| Native American or Alaska Native (NH) | 6 | 6 | 0.04% | 0.05% |
| Asian (NH) | 73 | 75 | 0.54% | 0.58% |
| Pacific Islander or Native Hawaiian (NH) | 0 | 2 | 0.00% | 0.02% |
| Some other race (NH) | 11 | 27 | 0.08% | 0.21% |
| Mixed race or Multiracial (NH) | 19 | 62 | 0.14% | 0.48% |
| Hispanic or Latino (any race) | 11,573 | 11,380 | 85.80% | 88.40% |
| Total | 13,488 | 12,873 | 100.00% | 100.00% |

=== 2020 census ===
As of the 2020 census, Olympia Heights had a population of 12,873. The median age was 46.7 years. 17.1% of residents were under the age of 18 and 24.5% of residents were 65 years of age or older. For every 100 females there were 93.0 males, and for every 100 females age 18 and over there were 88.7 males age 18 and over.

100.0% of residents lived in urban areas, while 0.0% lived in rural areas.

There were 4,138 households in Olympia Heights, of which 31.2% had children under the age of 18 living in them. Of all households, 52.2% were married-couple households, 14.1% were households with a male householder and no spouse or partner present, and 26.5% were households with a female householder and no spouse or partner present. About 16.8% of all households were made up of individuals and 9.5% had someone living alone who was 65 years of age or older.

There were 4,243 housing units, of which 2.5% were vacant. The homeowner vacancy rate was 0.8% and the rental vacancy rate was 2.8%.

The Census Bureau's 2020 ACS 5-year estimates reported 3,257 families in the CDP.

=== 2010 census ===
As of the 2010 United States census, there were 13,488 people, 3,793 households, and 2,932 families residing in the CDP.

=== 2000 census ===
As of the census of 2000, there were 13,452 people, 4,157 households, and 3,487 families residing in the CDP. The population density was 4,941.5 inhabitants per square mile (1,907.9/km^{2}). There were 4,231 housing units at an average density of 1,554.2 per square mile (600.1/km^{2}). The racial makeup of the CDP was 93.50% White (22.3% were Non-Hispanic White), 0.83% African American, 0.10% Native American, 0.91% Asian, 2.46% from other races, and 2.19% from two or more races. Hispanic or Latino of any race were 76.33% of the population.

As of 2000, there were 4,157 households, out of which 30.2% had children under the age of 18 living with them, 65.2% were married couples living together, 13.6% had a female householder with no husband present, and 16.1% were non-families. 12.4% of all households were made up of individuals, and 6.8% had someone living alone who was 65 years of age or older. The average household size was 3.22 and the average family size was 3.41.

In 2000, in the CDP, the population was spread out, with 20.0% under the age of 18, 7.7% from 18 to 24, 26.7% from 25 to 44, 26.1% from 45 to 64, and 19.6% who were 65 years of age or older. The median age was 42 years. For every 100 females, there were 91.8 males. For every 100 females age 18 and over, there were 88.9 males.

In 2000, the median income for a household in the CDP was $50,720, and the median income for a family was $54,533. Males had a median income of $34,382 versus $23,406 for females. The per capita income for the CDP was $18,198. About 5.4% of families and 6.9% of the population were below the poverty line, including 5.8% of those under age 18 and 10.9% of those age 65 or over.

As of 2000, speakers of Spanish as a first language accounted for 80.44% of residents, while English as a mother tongue made up 19.55% of the population.

== Education ==
Southwest Miami High School

Miami-Dade County Public Schools serves Olympia Heights.

Blue Lakes Elementary School is in Olympia Heights. Blue Lakes Elementary school's address is 9250 SW 52nd Terrace, Miami, FL 33165. Olympia Heights Elementary School is located in University Park CDP, adjacent to Olympia Heights. Olympia Heights Elementary school's address is 9797 SW 40th St, Miami, FL 33165.

Southwest Miami High School is located in Olympia Heights.

Private schools in Olympia Heights include Gulliver Pinecrest Preparatory School Miller Drive Campus, Florida Christian School, and King's Christian School. Pinecrest Preparatory opened in 1996.

Florida International University, as of the 2020 U.S. census, is in the Westchester census-designated place. In the 1990 U.S. census it was in the Olympia Heights CDP.
