= Miami Avenue =

Street in Miami, Florida

- Length: 14.9 mi (24.0 km); Two non-contiguous segments interrupted by the Golden Glades Interchange
- Location: Miami-Dade County, Florida, United States
- South end: Mercy Way in Miami
- Major junctions: US 1 in Miami; US 41 in Miami; SR 970 in Miami; SR 968 in Miami; I-395 in Miami; US 27 in Miami; I-195 in Miami; SR 826 in North Miami Beach; North 173rd Street in North Miami Beach SR 860 in Miami Gardens
- North end: SR 854 in Miami Gardens

Construction
- Inauguration: 1920

Miami Avenue is a 16.8-mile (27.0 km) main north–south street running through Coconut Grove, Brickell, Downtown, and Midtown in Miami, Florida. It is the meridian road dividing the street grid of Miami and Miami-Dade County into east and west avenues.

== Route description ==
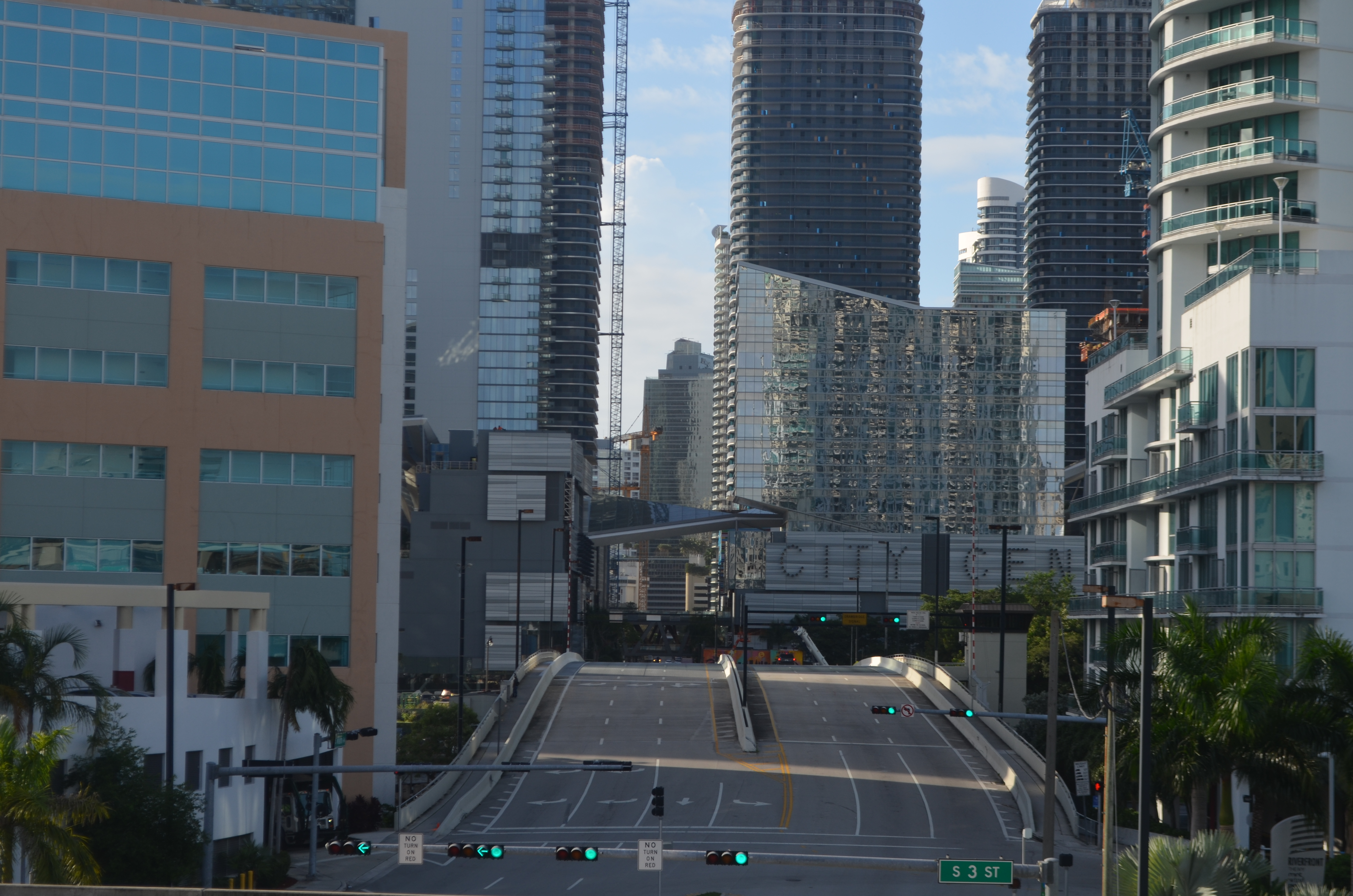
Looking south from Third Street station in 2016 after construction of Brickell City Centre and other new buildings.

The southern terminus is on South Bayshore Drive in the Coconut Grove neighborhood of Miami at Fairview Street close to Mercy Hospital. It is one way northbound from South 15th Road to South Fourth Street. It is one way southbound from North 17th Street to the Miami River downtown where it curves onto South First Avenue. At Flagler Street, the latitudinal baseline north–south road of the Miami area, extends from the central business district of downtown Miami to the west Miami-Dade, South Miami Avenue becomes North Miami Avenue. North of North 17th Street it is two way and continues north through the city of Miami until it crosses the Little River Canal after North 85th Street and enters the village of El Portal.

It continues north through El Portal a short distance until it crosses North 90th Street and enters the village of Miami Shores. It continues north through Miami Shores until it crosses North 115th Street and enters unincorporated Miami-Dade County. It continues north through Miami-Dade County until it crosses North 167th Street and enters the city of North Miami Beach where it continues north a short distance to North 173rd Street at a dead end near the Golden Glades Interchange.

The road resumes north from Miami Gardens Drive, terminating at Ives Dairy Road.

=== Brickell ===
In Brickell, Miami Avenue is Brickell's main restaurant and nightlife avenue, with many bars, restaurants, and lounges, including the now-demolished Tobacco Road.

In 2022, Miami-Dade County commissioners and the City of Miami co-designated a stretch of South Miami Avenue (from Southeast 15th Road to Southeast 13th) as Alicia Cervera Way, honoring the Peruvian-American businesswoman and real estate figure.

== Major intersections ==
Miami Avenue is the dividing line between Northwest and Northeast streets. The entire route is in Miami-Dade County.

Location	mi	km	Destinations	Notes
Miami	0.0	0.0	Fairview Street	
Miami	0.8	1.3	US 1	
Miami	2.3	3.7	US 41 (Tamiami Trail / South 8th Street / SR 90)	
Miami	2.7	4.3	Downtown Distributor (SR 970)	
Miami	2.9	4.7	SR 968 (Flagler Street)	Central Miami
Miami	5.4	8.7	US 27 (North 36th Street)	
Miami	5.5	8.9	I-195 (Julia Tuttle Causeway)	Exit 2A on I-195
Miami	6.4	10.3	SR 944 (North 54th Street)	
Miami	8.0	12.9	SR 934 (North 79th Street)	
Miami Shores	9.5	15.3	SR 932 (North 103rd Street)	
	10.5	16.9	SR 924 (Gratigny Road / North 119th Street)	
North Miami	10.9	17.5	SR 922 (North 125th Street)	
North Miami	11.5	18.5	SR 916 (North 135th Street)	
North Miami Beach	13.5	21.7	SR 826 (North 167th Street / North Miami Beach Boulevard)	To Palmetto Expressway
North Miami Beach	13.9	22.4	North 173rd Street	
Golden Glades Interchange, gap in route
Miami Gardens	0.0	0.0	SR 860 (Miami Gardens Drive / North 183rd Street)	
Miami Gardens	1.0	1.6	Ives Dairy Road / North 199th Street	Former SR 854
1.000 mi = 1.609 km; 1.000 km = 0.621 mi

== See also ==
- Brickell Avenue
- Biscayne Boulevard
- Flagler Street
- Brickell
- Downtown Miami

== Gallery ==
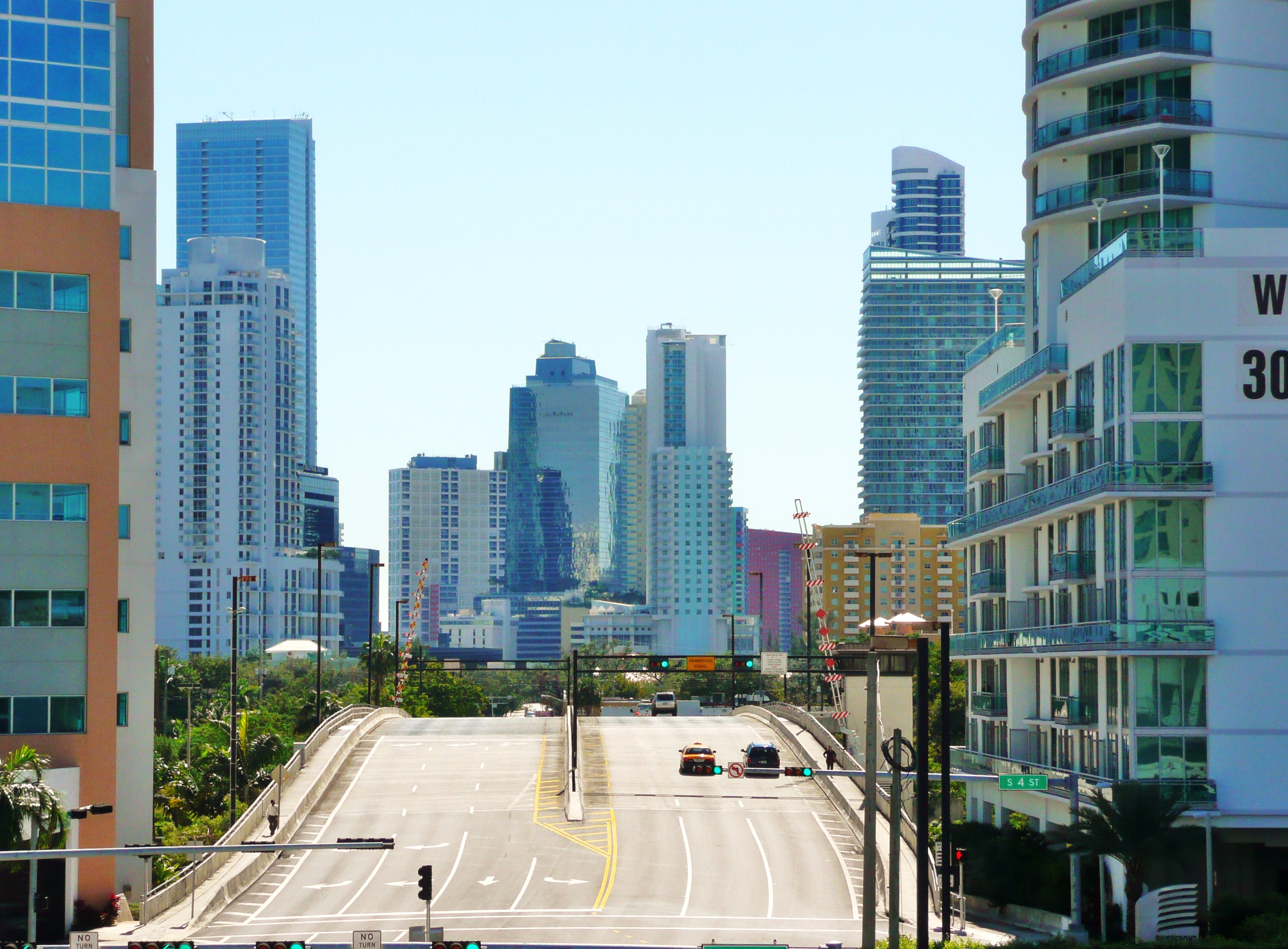
Miami Avenue facing south as it crosses the Miami River into Brickell

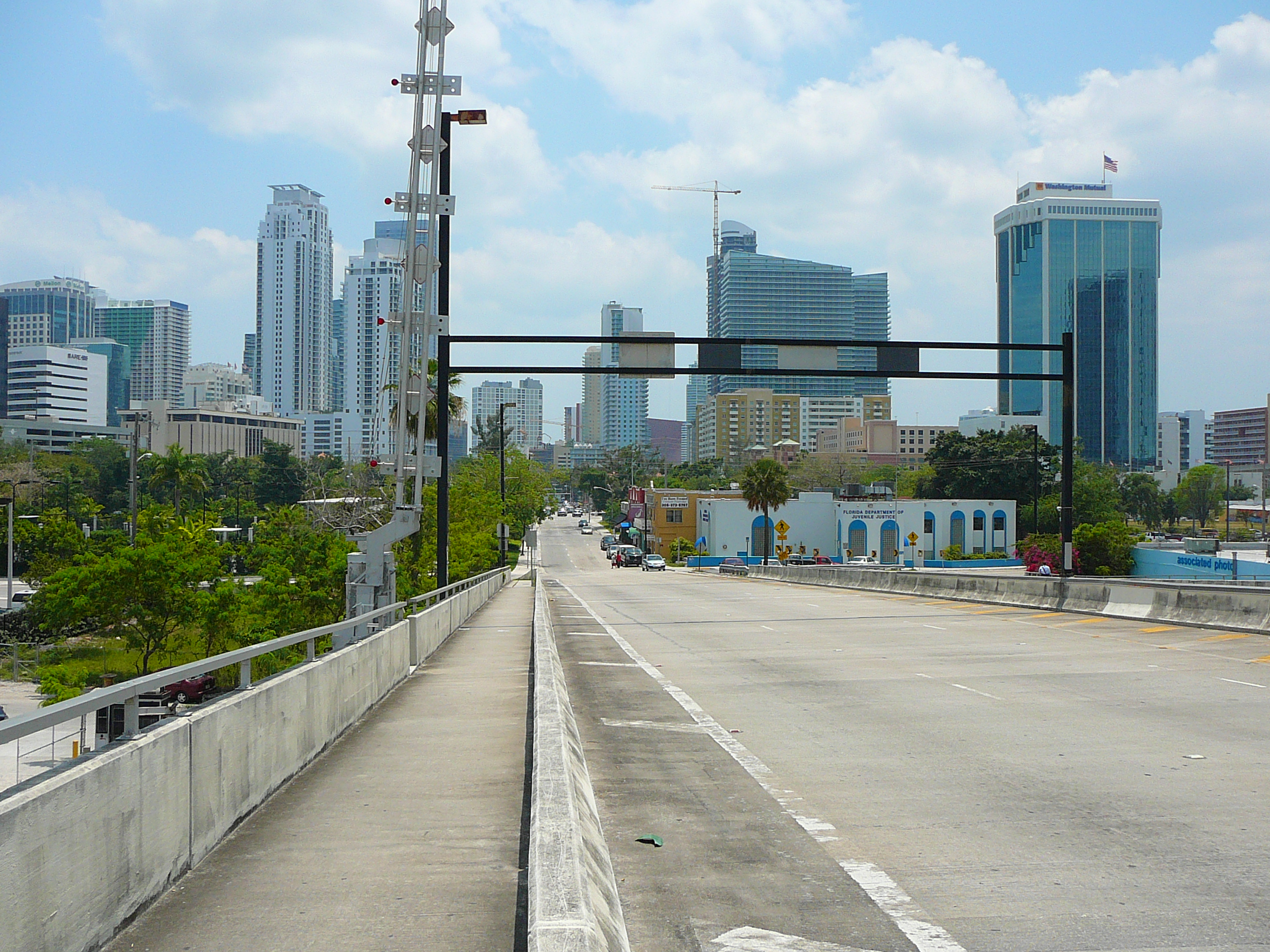
Miami Avenue facing south as it crosses the Miami River into Brickell

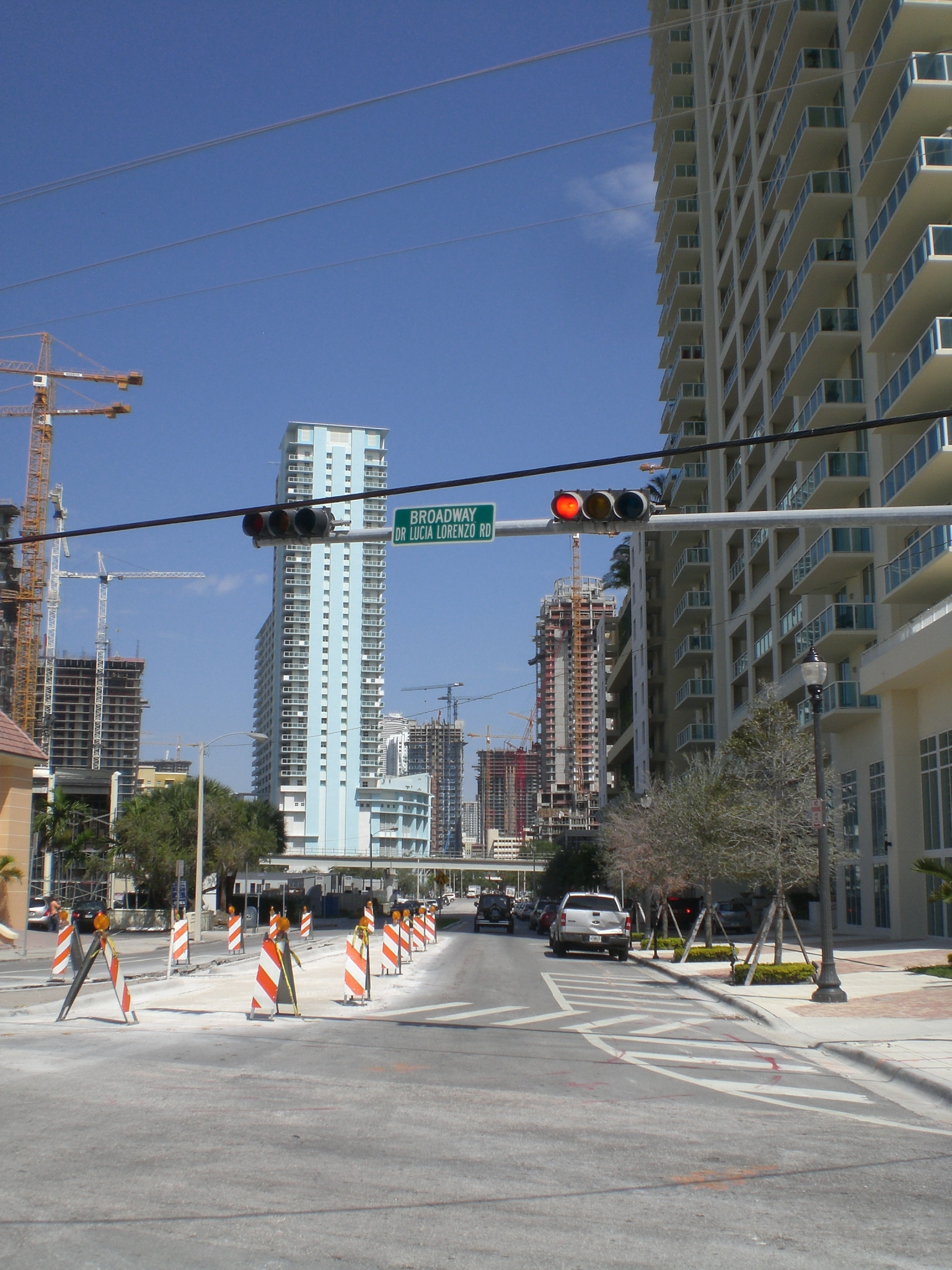
Miami Avenue facing north in Brickell

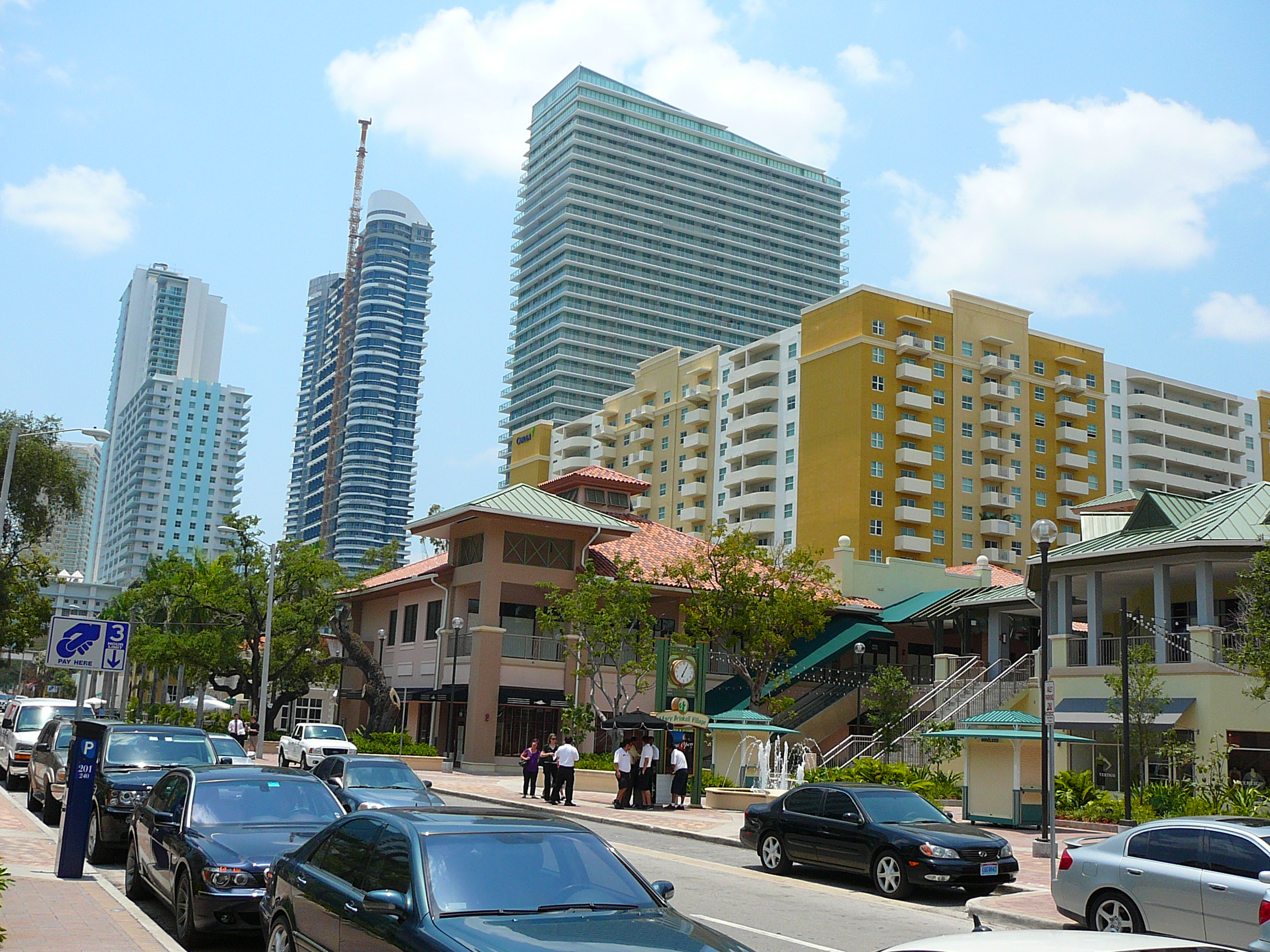
Mary Brickell Village on Miami Avenue
