= Florida State Road 815 =

State highway in Florida, United States

State Road 815
- East 2nd Avenue

Route information
- Maintained by Miami-Dade County
- Length: 7.76 mi (12.49 km)
- Existed: 1945–1995

Major junctions
- South end: US 1 / SR 5 in Downtown Miami
- SR 968 in Downtown Miami; I-395 / SR 836 in Downtown Miami; US 27 / SR 25 in Miami; I-195 / SR 112 in Miami; SR 944 in Miami; SR 934 in Miami; SR 932 in Miami Shores; SR 909 in North Miami
- North end: SR 924 in North Miami

Location
- Country: United States
- State: Florida

Highway system
- Florida State Highway System; Interstate; US; State; Former; Pre‑1945; Toll; Scenic

Once a part of the original Dixie Highway, the former State Road 815 was a 7.76-mile-long north–south route that served - and still serves - as a commuter alternative to the nearby Biscayne Boulevard (US 1-SR 5) that was part of the Florida State Roads system for five decades. Located entirely in Dade County, SR 815 was locally known as East Second Avenue. The southern terminus of SR 815 was an intersection of Southeast Second Avenue and Southeast Second Street at the Miami River; the northern terminus was an intersection of Northeast Second Avenue and North Gratigny Road (SR 924).

== Route description ==
State Road 815 started at the intersection of Southeast Second Avenue and Southeast Second Street, just north of the Miami River. SR 815 took Southeast Second Avenue north, where it became Northeast Second Avenue just two blocks north of the southern terminus at Flagler Street. SR 815 continued through Central Miami business, intersecting with Interstate 395 and then Interstate 195. Leaving Central Miami, it continues through residential streets, intersecting SR 944 and SR 934 before leaving Miami for Miami Shores. Continuing north, it intersects SR 932. In North Miami, it forms the eastern boundary for Barry University for several blocks before intersecting SR 909 just one block south of the northern terminus of North Gratigny Road (SR 924).

== History ==
State Road 815 was established in the 1945 Florida State Road renumbering. After the construction and opening of Interstate 95 and the Downtown Distributor (SR 970), traffic patterns in downtown Miami were altered, reducing SR 815's importance. Despite remaining a commuting and commercial alternative, the significance of SR 815 faded by the 1980s. First, the designation was removed from the southern half of the route; by 1994 it was barely noted on AAA and Rand McNally road maps; the following year, the Florida Department of Transportation transferred SR 815 maintenance responsibilities to Dade (now Miami-Dade) County control.

== Major intersections ==
The entire route was in Miami-Dade County.

Location	mi	km	Destinations	Notes
Miami	0.00	0.00	US 1 / SR 5	Southern terminus
Miami	0.11	0.18	SR 968 (East Flagler Street)	
Miami	0.91	1.46	I-395 / SR 836	
Miami	2.64	4.25	US 27 / SR 25	
Miami	2.70	4.35	I-195 / SR 112	
Miami	4.18	6.73	SR 944 (NE 62nd Street)	
Miami	5.21	8.38	SR 934 east (NE 79th Street)	Eastbound SR 934
Miami	5.36	8.63	SR 934 west (NE 82nd Street)	Westbound SR 934
Miami Shores	6.74	10.85	SR 932 (NE 103rd Street)	
North Miami	7.66	12.33	SR 909 (West Dixie Highway)	
North Miami	7.76	12.49	SR 924 (Gratigny Road)	Northern terminus
1.000 mi = 1.609 km; 1.000 km = 0.621 mi
