= Biscayne Park =

Biscayne Park can refer to the following places in the US state of Florida:

- Biscayne National Park
- Biscayne Park, Florida
