= Florida State Road 915 =

Highway in Miami-Dade County, Florida, United States

State Road 915
- Northeast 6th Avenue

Route information
- Maintained by FDOT
- Length: 5.867 mi (9.442 km)

Major junctions
- South end: US 1 in Miami Shores
- SR 922 in North Miami
- North end: I-95 / SR 860 in North Miami Beach

Location
- Country: United States
- State: Florida
- Counties: Miami-Dade

Highway system
- Florida State Highway System; Interstate; US; State; Former; Pre‑1945; Toll; Scenic
← SR 913	→ SR 916

State Road 915 (SR 915), locally known as Northeast Sixth Avenue, is a 5.86-mile-long (9.43 km) north–south street through the residential and business areas of the northern Miami-Dade County municipalities of Miami Shores, Biscayne Park, North Miami, and North Miami Beach. It extends from an intersection with Biscayne Boulevard (U.S. Route 1 or US 1) near Northeast 88th Terrace north to an interchange of Interstate 95 (I-95) and Miami Gardens Drive (SR 860, also called Northeast 183rd Street). It is often used by commuters as an alternative to the oft-congested Interstate and U.S. Highway between Miami and Hollywood.

== Route description ==
State Road 915 begins on the southern edge of Miami Shores at an oblique junction with Biscayne Boulevard (U.S. Route 1), with no direct access for southbound SR 915 travelers to northbound US 1. The road heads north, maintaining this orientation for most of its course, as a four-laned undivided road. After approximately a quarter-mile, SR 915 crosses the Florida East Coast Railroad tracks, and continues through a primarily residential neighborhood. SR 915 meets with SR 932 about three-quarters of a mile later, forming its eastern terminus. A short distance later, SR 915 swings eastwards in an arc to cross the Biscayne Canal and Griffing Boulevard, entering the village of Biscayne Park at this point, before resuming its original alignment. Upon entering North Miami, the road's neighborhood becomes more commercial as it leads up to the five-ways intersection with SR 922 and the eastern portion of SR 909. Apartment buildings line the road as it continues north for another half-mile to intersect SR 916. SR 915 continues north through more residential neighborhoods for another two miles before it meets SR 826, and crosses into North Miami Beach. The road then continues north past houses for another mile, terminating at an intersection with SR 860 and the access ramps for southbound Interstate 95.

== History ==
Prior to a statewide reallocation of numbers in the Florida State Roads system in 1983, Northeast Sixth Avenue was designated State Road 933 by the Florida Department of Transportation. After the change, the SR 933 was applied to a stretch of road five miles to the south of SR 916.

== Major intersections ==
The entire route is in Miami-Dade County.

Location	mi	km	Destinations	Notes
Miami Shores	0.000	0.000	US 1 south (Biscayne Boulevard)	No southbound access to US 1 north
Miami Shores	0.940	1.513	SR 932 west (Biscayne Road) to I-95	Northeast 103rd Street
North Miami	2.280	3.669	To SR 909 south (West West Dixie Highway)	Access via Northeast 123rd Street northbound, Northeast 124th Street southbound
North Miami	2.343	3.771	SR 922 (North Miami Boulevard)	Northeast 125th Street; no northbound left turn to SR 922 west
North Miami	2.372	3.817	SR 909 north (West Dixie Highway)	No southbound left turn to SR 909 north
North Miami	2.975	4.788	SR 916 (Northeast 135th Street) to I-95	
North Miami Beach	4.983	8.019	SR 826 (North Miami Beach Boulevard) to I-95	Northeast 167th Street
North Miami Beach	5.867	9.442	I-95 / SR 860 (Miami Gardens Drive) – Airport	Northeast 183rd Street; exit 14 on I-95
1.000 mi = 1.609 km; 1.000 km = 0.621 mi: Incomplete access

== See also ==
- List of state highways in Florida
