= Florida State Road 913 =

State highway in Florida, United States

State Road 913
- 26th Road; Rickenbacker Causeway; Crandon Boulevard
- SR 913 highlighted in red

Route information
- Maintained by FDOT
- Length: 7.486 mi (12.048 km) 0.373 miles (0.600 km) of state-maintained SR 913

Major junctions
- South end: Cape Florida State Park in Key Biscayne
- North end: I-95 / US 1 in Miami

Location
- Country: United States
- State: Florida
- Counties: Miami-Dade

Highway system
- Florida State Highway System; Interstate; US; State; Former; Pre‑1945; Toll; Scenic
← SR 909	→ SR 915

See also Rickenbacker Causeway, a causeway that forms part of the current alignment of SR 913

State Road 913 is an access road between the village of Key Biscayne on the island of Key Biscayne and I-95 in Miami on the western end of Biscayne Bay.

The only part of the road that is state maintained is South 26th Road; Miami-Dade County maintains the Rickenbacker Causeway across the Biscayne Bay and Virginia Key to Key Biscayne. Inside the village of Key Biscayne, the roadway is known as Crandon Boulevard after it crosses Bear Cut. Mile markers are posted along the entire route, with zero at the entrance to Bill Baggs Cape Florida State Park at the south end of Crandon Boulevard.

== Route description ==
Crandon Boulevard starts at the entrance to Bill Baggs Cape Florida State Park, and serves as a main artery for the village of Key Biscayne. North of the village, the road cuts through Crandon Park, passing by Crandon Beach and the Tennis Center at Crandon Park before it crosses Bear Cut onto Virginia Key, where the road becomes three lanes wide. Bear Cut also marks the southern terminus of the Rickenbacker Causeway and northern terminus of Crandon Boulevard.

After arriving on Virginia Key, the road passes by the University of Miami's Rosenstiel School of Marine, Atmospheric, and Earth Science, NOAA's Atlantic Oceanographic and Meteorological Laboratory (AOML), the Miami Seaquarium, MAST Academy, and Miami Marine Stadium. The William M. Powell Bridge carries traffic over Biscayne Bay. The road passes by more beaches on a short and thin barrier island before it reaches the toll plaza for the southbound Rickenbacker Causeway on the mainland, where state maintenance begins. The road's state road designation ends at I-95, but the road itself continues into Miami's The Roads neighborhood as Southwest 26th Road.

Toll on the Rickenbacker Causeway for southbound automobiles is $3.00 for drivers without a Sunpass and $2.25 for drivers with a Sunpass; northbound vehicles do not stop to pay toll.

== History ==
Originally, there was no State Road connection between I-95 and Key Biscayne when the Interstate highway was opened in 1967. The southernmost exit of the expressway was a short "trunk ramp" forming the southwestern end of Southwest 23rd Road at Southwest First Avenue (with the ramps having an at-grade crossing with Florida East Coast Railroad tracks before reaching First Avenue). Southbound traffic for the Miami Seaquarium, beaches, and other tourist attractions along the Rickenbacker Causeway would exit at Southwest 23rd Road, then take Southwest First Avenue to Southwest 25th Road, which would lead (via Brickell Avenue) to the toll booths on the entrance of the Causeway.

In the late 1970s and early 1980s, the railroad tracks were removed and houses along Southwest First Avenue between Southwest 15th Road and Southwest 12th Avenue were demolished to make room for Metrorail. The removal of this section of Southwest First Avenue resulted in a temporary lack of access of the Rickenbacker Causeway to southbound I-95 motorists (briefly, they were guided to it by way of Southwest Eighth Street (US 41-SR 90) and Brickell Avenue (US 1-SR 5). Ultimately (in the early 1980s), a new partial interchange was built for southbound I-95, this time at Southwest 25th and 26th Roads. This became the primary mode of access to Key Biscayne from the expressway.

On the other hand, motorists leaving the Rickenbacker Causeway has had direct access with northbound I-95 and southbound US 1 (Brickell Avenue) with flyover ramps since 1967.

In the mid-1980s, newly built sections Southwest and Southeast 26th Road, plus the two flyover ramps, were designated an unsigned State Road 913 and maintained by the Florida Department of Transportation as a state highway. FDOT now inventories the causeway and Crandon Boulevard as County Road 913.

== Major intersections ==
The entire route is in Miami-Dade County.

Location	mi	km	Destinations	Notes
Key Biscayne	0.000	0.000	Bill Baggs Cape Florida State Park	
Key Biscayne	0.4	0.64	West Mashta Drive	
Key Biscayne	1.3	2.1	Harbor Drive	
Crandon Park; Virginia Key	3.6– 4.1	5.8– 6.6	Bear Cut Bridge over Bear Cut	
Virginia Key	4.3	6.9	Virginia Key Beach Park, MAST Academy, Miami Marine Stadium & Miami Seaquarium	
Miami	5.6– 6.2	9.0– 10.0	William M. Powell Bridge over Biscayne Bay (Atlantic Intracoastal Waterway)	
Miami	6.9– 7.0	11.1– 11.3	West Bridge over Biscayne Bay	
Miami	7.113	11.447	Rickenbacker Causeway Toll Plaza ($1.75 toll southbound) south end of state maintenance	
Miami	7.145	11.499	I-95 north (SR 9A) / US 1 (SR 5) – Downtown Miami, Airport, Coral Gables	northbound exit; flyover
Miami	7.264	11.690	Brickell Avenue, South Dixie Highway	former US 1/SR 5, no left turn northbound onto South Dixie Highway
Miami	7.341	11.814	South Miami Avenue - Museum of Science, Vizcaya Museum & Gardens	
Miami	7.44	11.97	I-95 north (SR 9A) / US 1 north (SR 5) / Southwest 25th Road – Downtown Miami, Airport, Coral Gables	I-95 exit 1A; SR 913 is one-way southbound through the I-95 interchange
Miami	7.486	12.048	Southwest 1st Avenue	north end of state maintenance
1.000 mi = 1.609 km; 1.000 km = 0.621 mi
