= Florida State Road 925 =

Highway in Florida

State Road 925
- Northwest 3rd Avenue; Northwest 3rd Court

Route information
- Maintained by FDOT
- Length: 0.565 mi (909 m)
- Existed: 2014–present

Major junctions
- South end: SR 968 in Miami
- North end: I-95 on/off-ramps in Miami

Location
- Country: United States
- State: Florida
- Counties: Miami-Dade

Highway system
- Florida State Highway System; Interstate; US; State; Former; Pre‑1945; Toll; Scenic
← SR 924	→ SR 928

State Road 925 (SR 925) is a pair of north-south roads in Miami, Florida connecting westbound SR 968 with the Interstate 95 (I-95) exits on Northwest 8th Street. The northbound road is known locally as Northwest 3rd Avenue and runs 0.565 miles (0.909 km). The southbound road is known as Northwest 3rd Court and runs 0.506 miles (0.814 km). The roads run parallel Interstate 95 on opposite sides and serve as frontage roads for exits 2B and 3B off of the highway. The SR 925 designation was created in 2014 as part of a jurisdictional swap over various roadways between the Florida Department of Transportation (FDOT) and the City of Miami.

== Route description ==
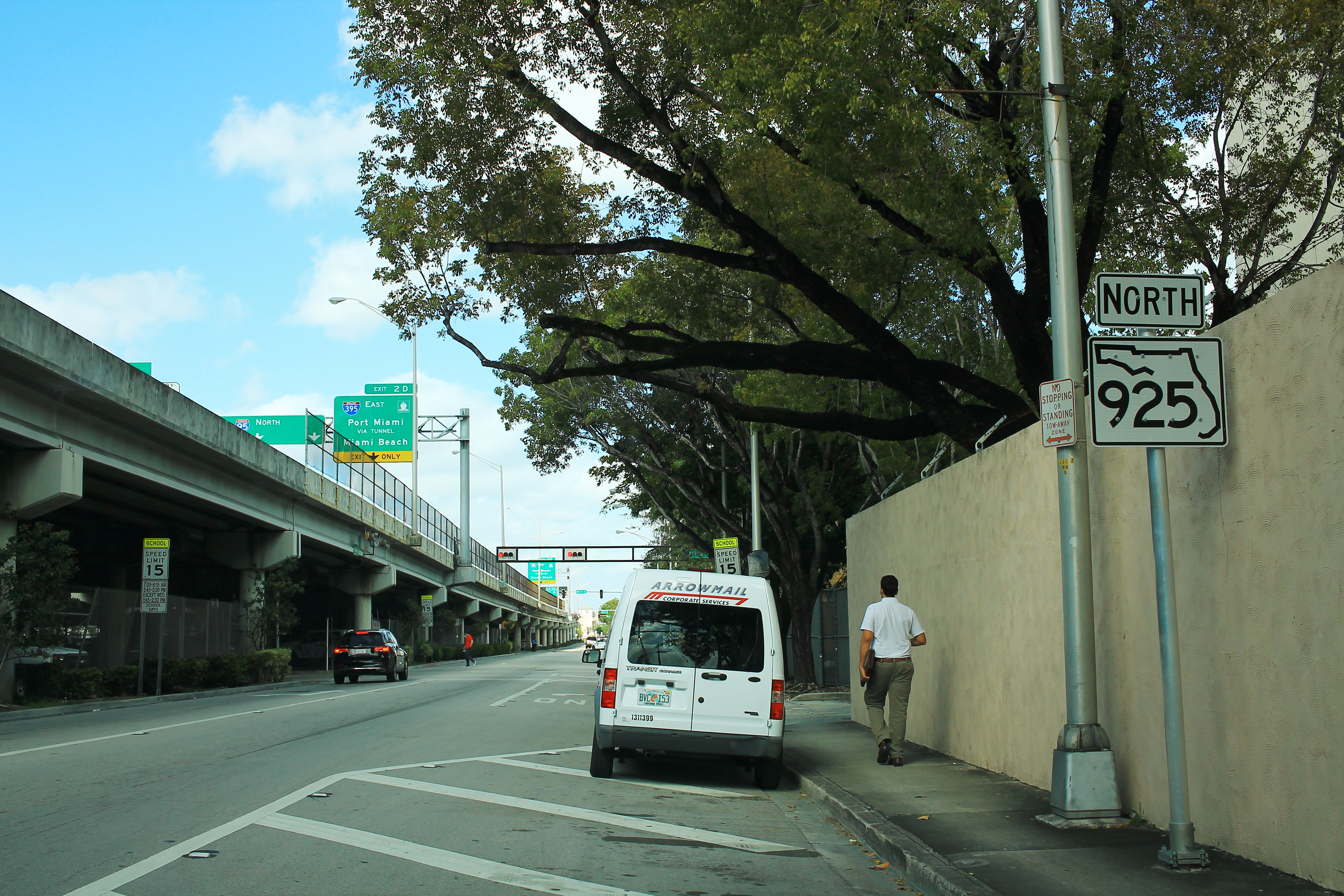
SR 925 along Northwest 3rd Avenue in Miami

Northbound SR 925 begins at SR 968 west and heads one-way north. It passes by the I-95 exit 2B off-ramp to Northwest 2nd Street, as well as the Miami-Dade County Juvenile Services Department, before entering a school zone assigned for the Downtown Miami Charter School. After intersecting Northwest 8th Street, an END SR 925 shield signals the northern terminus at the foot of the I-95 northbound on-ramp off Northwest 3rd Avenue.

Southbound SR 925 begins at the intersection of Northwest 8th Street and the I-95 exit 3B off-ramp, also accessible via SR 836 east. The road travels south down Northwest 3rd Court, passing Camillus House, apartment complexes, and Lummus Park. At the Northwest 2nd Street intersection exists an exit ramp that serves as both an I-95 southbound entrance, as well as a flyover ramp to connect motorists with US 41/SR 90. After traveling two more blocks south, the road terminates at SR 968 west.

== History ==
SR 925 was created as a condition by FDOT in order to transfer a segment of Brickell Avenue that once carried US Highway 1 (US 1) to the City of Miami. In exchange, the city transferred Northwest 6th Avenue & Northwest 6th Court, as well as Northwest 14th Street (SR 960) over to FDOT.

== Major intersections ==
Mileage follows the northbound lanes. The southbound lanes are slightly shorter, at 0.506 miles (0.814 km) long. The entire route is in Miami, Miami-Dade County.

mi	km	Destinations	Notes
0.000	0.000	SR 968 (Flagler Street)	
0.119	0.192	I-95 south / US 41 (Southwest 7th Street) / Brickell Avenue	Southbound exit and northbound entrance; exits 2A-B on I-95
0.565	0.909	I-95 north / Northwest 3rd Avenue north	Exit 3B on I-95; northbound lanes continues north without designation
1.000 mi = 1.609 km; 1.000 km = 0.621 mi: Incomplete access
