= Florida State Road 909 =

Highway in Miami-Dade County, Florida, United States

State Road 909
- West Dixie Highway

Route information
- Maintained by FDOT
- Length: 3.683 mi (5.927 km)
- Existed: 1983–present

Major junctions
- South end: SR 924 north of Miami Shores
- SR 915 / SR 922 in North Miami; SR 916 in North Miami
- North end: SR 826 in North Miami Beach

Location
- Country: United States
- State: Florida
- Counties: Miami-Dade

Highway system
- Florida State Highway System; Interstate; US; State; Former; Pre‑1945; Toll; Scenic
← SR 907A	→ SR 913

State Road 909 (SR 909) is a 3.77-mile (6.07 km) state highway in northern Miami-Dade County, Florida, United States, that runs along West Dixie Highway, the original alignment of the Dixie Highway, from the east end of Gratigny Drive (Florida State Road 924 [SR 924]/Northeast 119th Street) in North Miami northeast to North Miami Beach Boulevard (Florida State Road 826 [SR 826]/Northeast 163rd Street) in North Miami Beach, just across the Florida East Coast Railway from Biscayne Boulevard (U.S. Route 1 (US 1) and Florida State Road 5 (SR 5). SR 909 is actually in two pieces as motorists traveling the route in North Miami encounter signs on North Miami Boulevard (Florida State Road 922 [SR 922]/Northeast 125th Street) saying "TO 909" and "To W Dixie Hwy" and guiding them along a two-block "detour" to the other section.

== Route description ==
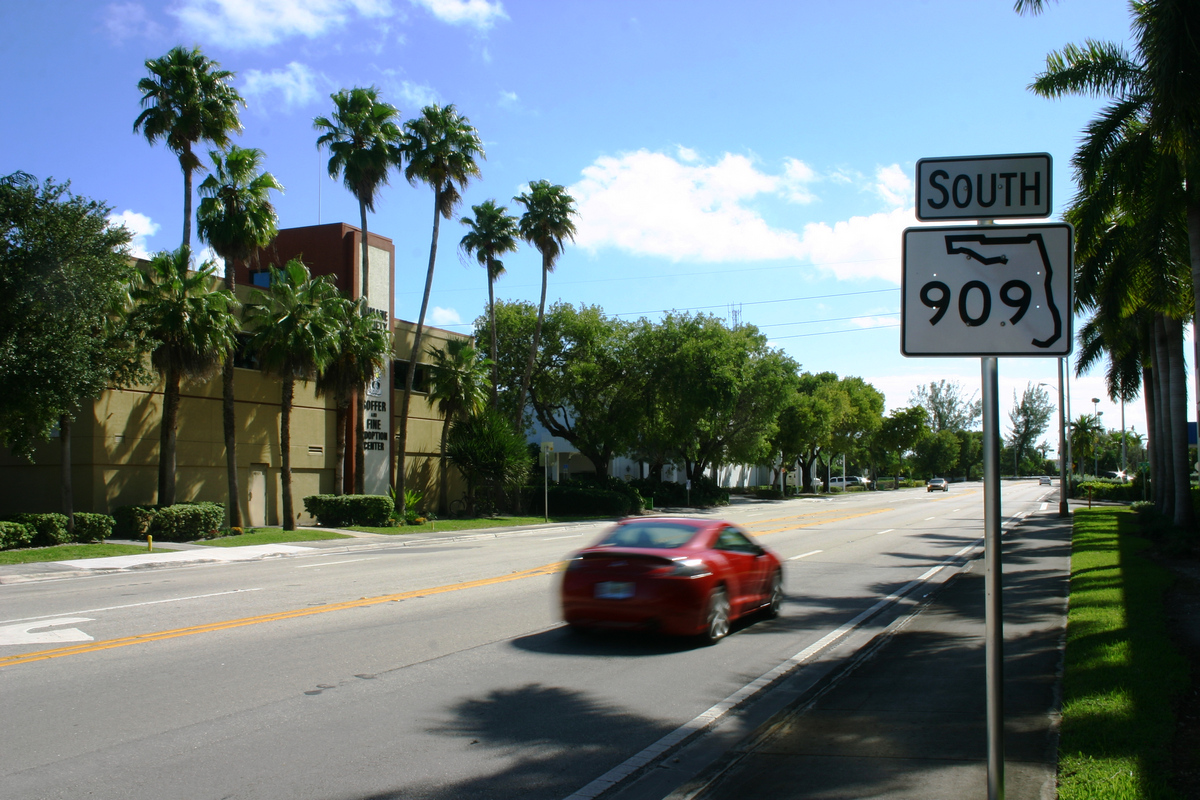
South on SR 909, just south of its northern terminus, in North Miami Beach, November 2011

SR 909 begins a few blocks to the northeast of Barry University, in unincorporated Miami-Dade County. The southern terminus of SR 909 is open to conjecture, as the Florida Department of Transportation (FDOT) states that the state-controlled section of the road begins at Northeast 119th Street, which corresponds to the eastern terminus of SR 924; however, signage on NE 119th Street indicates SR 909 begins further south, with some maps claiming SR 909's terminus to be at Northeast 2nd Avenue, the start of the signed West Dixie Highway. Regardless of the confusion of its origin, SR 909 continues in a north-easterly direction as a four-laned road past a mix of commercial and residential uses and crosses the Biscayne Canal to enter North Miami less than a quarter-mile north of SR 924. Past Griffing Boulevard, motorists are greeted with signage indicating "TO West Dixie Highway" and are directed to follow the one-way Northeast 123rd Street, with southbound traffic travelling via Northeast 124th Street. This is due to SR 909's interruption just south of a potential junction with Northeast 125th Street (SR 922); here, the road has been turned into a cul-de-sac with car parking spaces in the middle of the pavement.

SR 909 and the West Dixie Highway resume again half a block to the northeast of the cul-de-sac at a junction with Northeast 6th Avenue (SR 915), just a fraction north of SR 915's junction with SR 922, and resumes its northeast–southwest orientation as it leaves the commercial heart of North Miami. Due to its orientation, SR 909 creates oblique junctions and six-way intersections with surrounding streets. The West Dixie Highway is edged by storefronts as the road continues for the next three-quarters of a mile towards SR 916 (Northeast 135th Street). Shops lining the street continue as the norm as SR 909 carries on north-eastwards, interspersed with some low-rise apartment complexes. The road leaves North Miami near Northeast 143rd Street and enters North Miami Beach at Northeast 151st Street, becoming more residential in feel after this point as it passes parkland. As SR 909 approaches the Florida East Coast Railway tracks, it turns northwards and enters another commercial district. SR 909 then terminates a few blocks north of the turn at SR 826 (Northeast 163rd Street), a block west of Biscayne Boulevard (US 1), although the West Dixie Highway continues northwards in rough parallel to the railroad well into Broward County.

== History ==
Since the current SR 909 was the original Dixie Highway, it was part of pre-1945 SR 4. This old alignment continued south on Northeast Second Avenue to downtown Miami (the southern part was designated State Road 815 until the mid-1990s), and north on streets named West Dixie Highway, North Dixie Highway, and South Dixie Highway to Dania, and was assigned the pre-1945 SR 176 designation in 1931. It, however, did not receive a number in the 1945 renumbering.

For some time, the old (West, South, and North) Dixie Highway from SR 826 in Miami-Dade County north to SR 824 (Pembroke Road) in Broward County was a section of State Road 5A. This designation survived until the mid-1990s.

West Dixie Highway south of SR 826 received its current Florida Department of Transportation designation in 1983, replacing its original designation, State Road 929, which was applied by FDOT earlier in the decade.

== Major intersections ==
The entire route is in Miami-Dade County.

Location	mi	km	Destinations	Notes
	0.000	0.000	West Dixie Highway south	Continuation southeast from southern terminus (with some [incorrect] signage as SR 909)
	0.000	0.000	Northeast 118th Terrace east –West Biscayne Canal Road SR 924 west (Northeast 119th Street) – I-95, US 441, I-75	Southern terminus; eastern end of SR 924
North Miami	0.359	0.578	Northeast 123rd Street	Carries northbound traffic for SR 909
North Miami	0.449	0.723	Northeast 124th Street	Carries southbound traffic for SR 909
North Miami	Gap in route; connection made via Northeast 123rd/124th Streets and Northeast 6th Avenue (SR 915)			
North Miami	0.597	0.961	SR 915 north (Northeast 6th Avenue) – North Miami Beach, I-95 SR 915 south (Northeast 6th Avenue) – Miami Shores, US 1 SR 922 east (North Miami Boulevard) – Bal Harbour, Surfside, SR A1A SR 922 west (North Miami Boulevard) – I-95, US 441	SR 922 is Northeast 125th Street
North Miami	1.394	2.243	SR 916 east (Northeast 135th Street) – US 1 SR 916 west (Northeast 135th Street) – I-95, US 441, Opa-locka, I-75	
North Miami Beach	3.767	6.062	SR 826 east (North Miami Beach Boulevard) – Sunny Isles Beach, SR A1A SR 826 west (North Miami Beach Boulevard) – I-95, US 441, Miami Gardens, I-75	Northern terminus; SR 826 is Northeast 163rd Street
North Miami Beach	3.767	6.062	West Dixie Highway north	Continuation north from northern terminus
1.000 mi = 1.609 km; 1.000 km = 0.621 mi

== See also ==
- List of state highways in Florida
