= Florida State Road 9 =

State highway in Florida, United States

State Road 9
- Signed portion of SR 9 around Miami in red; expand map to see remainder of SR 9 designated along I-95 in blue

Route information
- Maintained by FDOT
- Length: 13.69 mi (22.03 km) 383.327 mi (616.905 km) including I-95 portion
- Existed: August 1946–present

Major junctions
- South end: US 1 in Miami
- US 41 in Miami; SR 836 in Miami; SR 112 in Brownsville; SR 924 in Opa-locka; I-95 / US 441 / SR 826 / Florida's Turnpike in Golden Glades; I-595 in Fort Lauderdale; SR 528 in Cocoa; I-4 in Daytona Beach; I-295 in Jacksonville; I-10 in Jacksonville
- North end: I-95 in Kingsland, GA

Location
- Country: United States
- State: Florida
- Counties: Miami-Dade, Broward, Palm Beach, Martin, St. Lucie, Indian River, Brevard, Volusia, Flagler, St. Johns, Duval, Nassau

Highway system
- Florida State Highway System; Interstate; US; State; Former; Pre‑1945; Toll; Scenic
| ← SR 8A | → SR 9A |

Florida State Road 9 (SR 9) is a state road in the U.S. state of Florida. While SR 9 is mainly used as a state designation for Interstate 95 in Florida from the Golden Glades Interchange in Miami Gardens to the Georgia border (near Yulee, Florida), a signed SR 9, which is locally known in the Miami area as West 27th Avenue, Unity Boulevard, and historically Grapeland Boulevard, extends 13 miles (21 km) from the Coconut Grove section of Miami to the Golden Glades Interchange (where the unsigned portion continues northward along I-95). The segment of I-95 south of the Golden Glades Interchange carries the designation of State Road 9A.

== Route description ==
Southwest 27th Avenue begins locally at Bayshore Drive in the Coconut Grove neighborhood in Miami. The road heads north 0.9 miles (1.4 km) until it intersects Dixie Highway (US 1). SR 9 begins at this intersection, located between the Coral Way and Coconut Grove neighborhoods. SR 9 then makes its way north, cutting through all three sub-neighborhoods of Coral Way—Silver Bluff, Coral Gate, and Shenandoah—with a major intersection with Coral Way (SR 972) in the middle of it. After passing through Coral Way, SR 9's next major intersection is with the Tamiami Trail (US 41 / SR 90) before passing through more residential areas. The next major intersection with Flagler Street is located only a block west from the historic Miami Senior High School, as well as a half block east from the Miami-Dade County Auditorium. SR 9 continues north for a mile before its interchange with the Dolphin Expressway (SR 836). Five blocks north of the Dolphin Expressway, SR 9 crosses the Miami River into the Allapattah neighborhood. There are two major intersections in Allapatah: the first is with Northwest 36th Street (US 27 / SR 25), and the second is with the Airport Expressway (SR 112). Afterwards, SR 9 leaves Miami city limits and bisects the CDP of Brownsville. While in Brownsville, Miami's Metrorail splits the street in two, with two lanes running in either direction on both sides of the track.

After its intersection with Northwest 79th Street (SR 934), SR 9 enters the CDPs of West Little River and Westview. In Westview, its intersection with Gratigny Road (SR 924) forms the east border and northeast corner of Miami-Dade College's North Campus, and is also a quarter mile west from the former Westview Country Club.

As it enters the city of Opa-locka, SR 9 intersects with Northwest 135th Street (SR 916) before turning to the northeast. Here, Northwest 27th Avenue continues northward as State Road 817. The signed portion of SR 9 ends at the Golden Glades Interchange 2.0 miles (3.22 km) later; however, SR 9 continues northward as a designation of Interstate 95 to the Georgia state line.

== History ==
The section of SR 9 northeast into the Golden Glades Interchange was planned before the Interstate Highway System as a bypass to US 1. The bypass route was built next to CSX's Miami Subdivision.

== Major intersections ==
| County | Location | mi | km | Destinations | Notes |
|---|---|---|---|---|---|
| Miami-Dade | Miami | 0.000 | 0.000 | US 1 (Dixie Highway) / Unity Boulevard south | Continues south without designation |
| Miami-Dade | Miami | 0.715 | 1.151 | SR 972 (Coral Way) – Airport | Southwest 22nd Street |
| Miami-Dade | Miami | 1.739 | 2.799 | US 41 (Southweset 8th Street) | Tamiami Trail |
| Miami-Dade | Miami | 2.231 | 3.590 | SR 968 (Flagler Street) | |
| Miami-Dade | Miami | 3.097 | 4.984 | SR 836 – Airport | DDI interchange with Dolphin Expressway |
| Miami-Dade | Miami | 3.625 | 5.834 | 27th Avenue Bridge over the Miami River | |
| Miami-Dade | Miami | 4.765 | 7.669 | US 27 (Northwest 36th Street) | |
| Miami-Dade | Brownsville | 4.989 | 8.029 | SR 112 to I-95 / I-195 – Airport | Interchange with Airport Expressway via local roads |
| Miami-Dade | Brownsville | 5.787 | 9.313 | SR 944 (Northwest 54th Street) | |
| Miami-Dade | Gladeview–West Little River line | 7.311 | 11.766 | SR 934 (Northwest 79th Street) | |
| Miami-Dade | West Little River | 8.834 | 14.217 | SR 932 (Northwest 103rd Street) | |
| Miami-Dade | Westview | 9.853 | 15.857 | SR 924 east (Gratigny Road) / SR 924 west | Northwest 119th Street; tolled westbound only |
| Miami-Dade | Opa-locka | 10.843 | 17.450 | SR 916 east (Northwest 135th Street) | One-way eastbound |
| Miami-Dade | Opa-locka | 10.893 | 17.531 | SR 916 west (Opa-locka Boulevard) | One-way westbound |
| Miami-Dade | Opa-locka | 11.113 | 17.885 | SR 817 north (Unity Boulevard) | SR 9 leaves Unity Boulevard; southern terminus of SR 817 |
| Miami-Dade | Golden Glades | 13.224 | 21.282 | US 441 south (SR 7 south) – Tri-Rail | No southbound entrance; via Northwest 7th Avenue; Golden Glades Interchange |
| Miami-Dade | Golden Glades | 13.690 | 22.032 | Florida's Turnpike north to Florida's Turnpike Extension / SR 826 west | Southern terminus of Florida's Turnpike |
| Miami-Dade | Golden Glades | 13.690 | 22.032 | SR 826 east – Beaches | Via Miami Beach Boulevard; western terminus of SR 826 |
| Miami-Dade | Golden Glades | 13.690 | 22.032 | US 441 north (SR 7 north) | Via Northwest 2nd Avenue |
| Miami-Dade | Golden Glades | 13.690 | 22.032 | I-95 south – Miami | South end of I-95 concurrency; exit 12 on I-95 |
1.000 mi = 1.609 km; 1.000 km = 0.621 mi: Concurrency terminus; Electronic toll collection; Incomplete access

== Related routes ==
=== State Road 9A (Jacksonville) ===
State Road 9A
- Location: Jacksonville

State Road 9A (SR 9A) is a state road in Jacksonville, Florida. It is the FDOT designation of Interstate 295. The freeway, divided into the East Beltway and the West Beltway, circles the Jacksonville metropolitan area.

=== State Road 9A (Miami) ===
State Road 9A
- Location: Miami-Dade County

State Road 9A (SR 9A) is a state road in Miami-Dade County. It is the FDOT designation of Interstate 95 from its junction with SR 9 in North Miami Beach to the freeway's southern terminus at US 1.

=== State Road 9B ===
State Road 9B
- Location: Jacksonville / St. Johns County

State Road 9B is a freeway that runs between Duval County and St. Johns County. It connects the southeastern corner of Interstate 295 with CR 2209 in St. Johns County, crossing over I-95 and US 1 in the process. The freeway from I-95 to I-295 is expected to be signed as Interstate 795.

=== State Road 961 ===
State Road 961
- Location: Miami
- Length: 0.068 mi (109 m)

State Road 961, known as Southwest 4th Avenue, is a short, one-way southbound connector street located between the separated east and west rights-of-way of Tamiami Trail (US 41/SR 90). The street facilitates I-95 (SR 9A) exit 1B allowing motorists to enter or exit the interstate from either direction. The exit ramp is located at the northern terminus of SR 961, with the entrance ramp located at the southern terminus. The road runs for 0.068 miles (0.109 km).

Browse numbered routes
| ← SR 960 | SR 961 | → SR 963 |
