= Florida State Road 953 =

Highway in Florida

State Road 953
- LeJeune Road; West 42nd Avenue
- SR 953 highlighted in red

Route information
- Maintained by FDOT
- Length: 11.735 mi (18.886 km)
- Existed: 1983 (as SR 953)–present

Major junctions
- South end: US 1 in Coral Gables
- US 41 in Miami; SR 836 in Miami; US 27 in Hialeah; SR 934 in Hialeah
- North end: SR 916 in Opa-locka

Location
- Country: United States
- State: Florida
- Counties: Miami-Dade

Highway system
- Florida State Highway System; Interstate; US; State; Former; Pre‑1945; Toll; Scenic
← SR 951	→ SR 959

State Road 953 (SR 953), locally known as LeJeune Road (pronounced "Luh-JOO-n"), is a 11.735 miles (18.886 km) long north–south street in Miami-Dade County, Florida running a few miles west of central Miami from U.S. Route 1 in Coral Gables to State Road 916 in Opa-locka. It is also known as West 42nd Avenue on the greater Miami grid plan and East 8th Avenue in the Hialeah grid plan.

== Route description ==
LeJeune Road proper begins at a traffic circle with Sunset Drive and Old Cutler Road in the city of Coral Gables, but the state designation actually begins 1.4 miles (2.3 km) north at an intersection with U.S. Route 1 (Dixie Highway).

SR 953 heads north from US 1 as a four-lane road through residential areas, the eastern end of Coral Gables Senior High School, and the western end of the Village of Merrick Park mall. SR 953 intersects Bird Road and leaves the campus of Coral Gables High School, entering a pure residential area and remains that way until reaching University Drive. At that point, the east side of the road becomes commercial and the west side is residential until close to the intersection with Coral Way (State Road 972). A few blocks north of Coral Way, it resumes with residential housing on the west side of the road and commercial buildings to the east, still in Coral Gables.

At Zamora Avenue, LeJeune Road divides Coral Gables to the west with unincorporated Miami-Dade County to the east, and enters unincorporated Miami-Dade County just one block north at Mendoza Avenue, becoming purely a residential street again. At Southwest 8th Street (US 41/Tamiami Trail), LeJeune Road enters the city of Miami, and becomes a divided road, with two lanes in each direction.

LeJeune continues north through Miami, remaining a residential street for six blocks before becoming a commercial road. It continues north through Miami as a commercial street until an interchange with the Dolphin Expressway (SR 836), where the road becomes a divider between the International Links Miami-Melreese golf course to the east and a parking lot to the west. It reenters unincorporated Miami-Dade County after crossing the Tamiami Canal just south of the entrance to Miami International Airport and its interchange with the southern terminus of the Airport Expressway (SR 112). Between SR 953's entrance of the airport and the next major interchange north, State Road 948, it creates the eastern boundary of the airport, with airport related business to the east of LeJeune Road.

Just two blocks north of SR 948, SR 953 crosses canal C-6 and crosses US 27 (Okeechobee Road), entering Hialeah as their Southeast 8th Avenue and no longer a divided road. It continues north as a residential street, crossing State Road 944, becoming East 8th Avenue, the easternmost major street in Hialeah, with some commercial business at East 9th Street, State Road 934, East 41st Street and State Road 932. North of East 57th Street, it passes by a truck distribution center to the east, and a park to the west. SR 953 then splits off to the LeJeune/Douglas Road Expressway Connection, providing nearby access to State Road 924, followed by an intersection with East 65th Street at the south end of Amelia Earhart Park, leaving Hialeah and entering Opa-locka where it is again West 42nd Avenue. North of SR 924, LeJeune Road is a purely commercial road, servicing truck distribution centers as SR 953 heads towards its northern terminus of State Road 916 (North 135th Street).

North of SR 916, LeJeune Road continues for 0.6 miles (0.97 km), towards a dead-end inside Opa-locka Airport. North of the airport, Northwest 42nd Avenue continues north to a dead end beyond North 204th Street.

== History ==
According to Joaquin Roy, a highly regarded professor from the University of Miami in his 1989 book "The Streets of Coral Gables"; LeJeune Road was named after Charles Le Jeune (b. 1878, Belgium) who came to Florida around 1900 and acquired 140 acres (57 ha) of coral rock land on which he used dynamite to create tillable soil, and then cultivated orange, grapefruit and lime groves. The road that was the boundary of his property became known as LeJeune Road. In 1914, Charles Le Jeune sold his groves to (George) Merrick, developer of Coral Gables, Florida, for $1,700,000. It runs adjacent to the east side and crosses the original entrance/exit to Miami International Airport.

At one point during the 1960s, the entire route was to be upgraded to freeway status, but the plans were cancelled. Several attempts to upgrade LeJeune Road around Miami International Airport have been proposed, with all of them failing.

Prior to 1983, LeJeune Road was signed as State Road 913 south of North 103rd Street (SR 932); a designation now being applied to the Rickenbacker Causeway approach.

== Major intersections ==
The entire route is in Miami-Dade County.

Location	mi	km	Destinations	Notes
Coral Gables	0.000	0.000	US 1 (Dixie Highway) / LeJeune Road south	No left turn from either direction of LeJeune Road
Coral Gables	0.569	0.916	SR 976 (Bird Road)	Southwest 40th Street
Coral Gables	1.575	2.535	Coral Way	Southwest 22nd Street; former SR 972
Miami	2.617	4.212	US 41 (Southwest 8th Street)	Tamiami Trail
Miami	3.117	5.016	SR 968 (Flagler Street)	
Miami	4.06	6.53	SR 836 – Downtown Miami	
Miami	4.118	6.627	SR 960 (Northwest 14th Street)	
Miami–Miami Springs line	4.71	7.58	Northwest 21st Street – Miami International Airport	Interchange; no northbound access to eastbound 21st Street
Miami–Miami Springs line	4.968	7.995	Northwest 25th Street – Rental Car Center	
Miami Springs	5.57	8.96	South River Drive	Northbound exit only
Miami Springs	5.57	8.96	SR 112 east to I-95 – Miami Beach	Northbound exit and southbound entrance
Miami Springs	5.658	9.106	SR 948 (Doral Boulevard) to SR 826 / I-75	Northwest 36th Street
Hialeah	5.820	9.366	US 27 (Okeechobee Road) to SR 112 east	At-grade intersection except northbound flyover to US 27 north
Hialeah	6.679	10.749	SR 944 (Hialeah Drive) to I-95	Northwest 54th Street
Hialeah	8.196	13.190	SR 934 (East 25th Street) to I-95	Northwest 79th Street
Hialeah	9.722	15.646	SR 932 (East 49th Street)	Northwest 103rd Street
Hialeah	10.492	16.885	LeJeune/Douglas Connector north to SR 924	Northbound exit and southbound entrance
Hialeah–Opa-locka line	10.726	17.262	East 65th Street to SR 924	Northwest 119th Street
Opa-locka	11.735	18.886	SR 916 (Northwest 135th Street) / LeJeune Road north	Continues north to Miami-Opa Locka Executive Airport
1.000 mi = 1.609 km; 1.000 km = 0.621 mi: Electronic toll collection; Incomplete access
