= Florida State Road 960 =

State highway in Florida, United States

State Road 960
- Northwest 14th Street

Route information
- Maintained by FDOT
- Length: 0.671 mi (1,080 m)
- Existed: 2014–present

Major junctions
- East end: SR 836 in Miami
- West end: Northwest 42nd Court in Miami

Location
- Country: United States
- State: Florida
- Counties: Miami-Dade

Highway system
- Florida State Highway System; Interstate; US; State; Former; Pre‑1945; Toll; Scenic
← SR 959	→ SR 961

State Road 960 (SR 960), locally known as Northwest 14th Street, is a 0.671-mile-long (1.080 km) east–west street adjacent to Miami International Airport in western Miami-Dade County, Florida. The easternmost segment between the route's eastern terminus and Northwest 37th Avenue is one way westbound. The road runs parallel to the Dolphin Expressway. The designation was created in 2014 as part of a jurisdictional swap over various roadways between the Florida Department of Transportation (FDOT) and the City of Miami.

== Route description ==
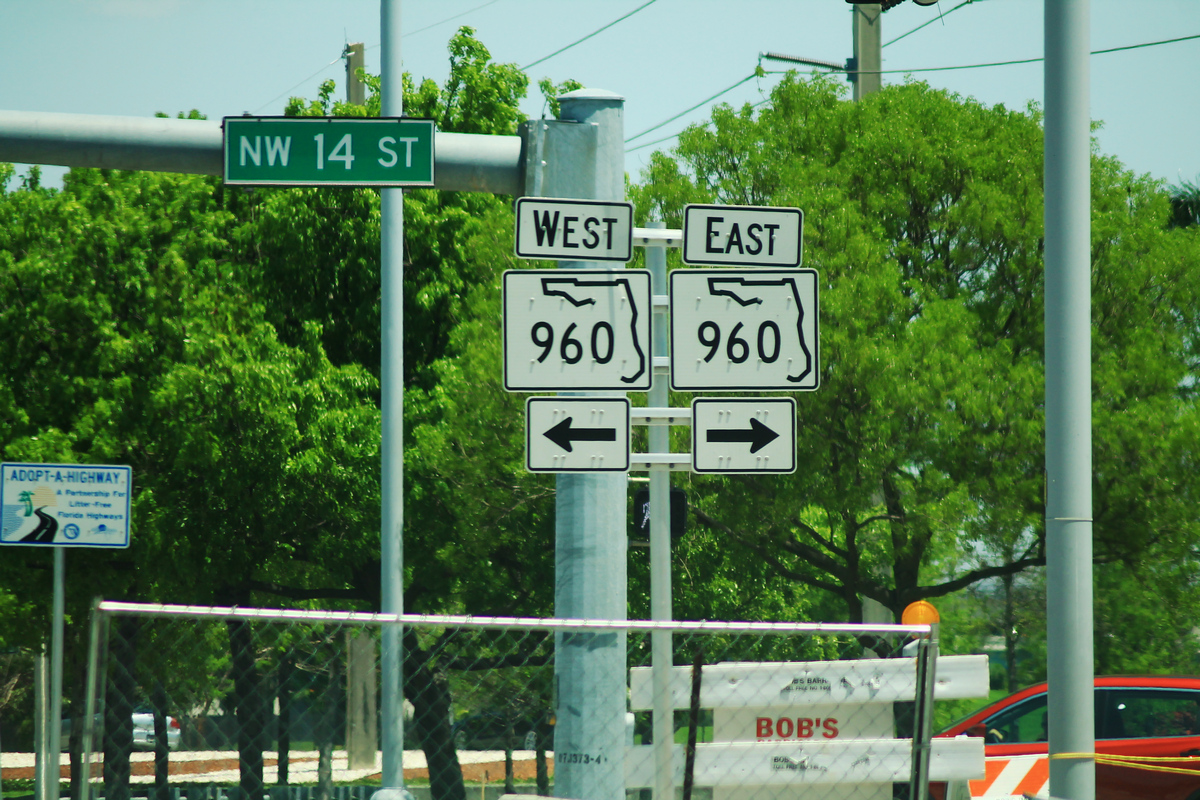
Signs denoting Florida State Road 960, located on LeJuene Road in Miami.

SR 960 begins at the foot of the Dolphin Expressway exit off-ramp serving Northwest 37th Avenue/Douglas Road. Between these two points, the road runs one way westward. SR 960 then passes underneath two overhead exit ramps, one of which serves Miami International Airport from the Dolphin Expressway, and intersects LeJeune Road (SR 953). After passing underneath the Northwest 12th Drive bridge, the route comes to an abrupt end at Northwest 42nd Court.

== History ==
SR 960 was created as a condition by FDOT in order to transfer a segment of Brickell Avenue that once carried US Highway 1 (US 1) to the City of Miami. In exchange, the city transferred Northwest 14th Street, as well as Northwest 6th Avenue & Northwest 6th Court (SR 925), over to FDOT.

== Major intersections ==
The entire route is in Miami, Miami-Dade County.

mi	km	Destinations	Notes
0.000	0.000	SR 836 east (Dolphin Expressway)	East end of westbound traffic and state maintenance at SR 836 off-ramp
0.067	0.108	Douglas Road / Northwest 37th Avenue	East end of eastbound traffic
0.582	0.937	SR 953 (LeJeune Road / Northwest 42nd Avenue) to SR 836 – Coral Gables, Airport	
0.671	1.080	Northwest 42nd Court	West end of state maintenance
1.000 mi = 1.609 km; 1.000 km = 0.621 mi
