= Midway Crossings =

- Location: Miami, Florida
- Coordinates: 25°46′26″N 80°19′19″W
- Address: 7795 West Flagler Street
- Opened: Late 1970
- Developer: Herbet Sadkin and Edward M. Strawgate
- Owner: Sterling Organization
- Architect: Don Reiff and Mort Fellmann
- Num. of anchor tenants: 6
- Floor area: 798,149 sq ft (74,150.5 m^{2})
- Floors: 2
- Website: Official website

Midway Crossings is an enclosed shopping mall located at 7795 West Flagler Street next to the Palmetto Expressway in Miami, Florida. The mall was previously known as Midway Mall (1970–1987), and Mall of the Americas (1987–2022).

== History ==
Midway Crossings opened in late-1970 as Midway Mall. The mall had 80 stores and was the first purpose built enclosed shopping mall in Greater Miami. On opening day, there were 3 anchor spaces occupied by J.B. Hunter, Richards, and Woolco, with junior anchor spaces occupied by F. W. Woolworth and Winn-Dixie.

The mall was developed by Herbet Sadkin and Edward M. Strawgate. It was designed by the architectural firm of Don Reiff and Mort Fellmann. The project was the most expensive non-resident construction in South Florida of 1970 and was spread over a fifty-five acre site.

In 1974, Jefferson Stores purchased J.B. Hunter and the store at Midway Mall was rebranded to Jefferson in 1974. The store became Jefferson Ward in 1980. In the same year on January 11, Richard's closed its store at the Midway Mall due to the company filing for bankruptcy and liquidating all of its locations. Following its closure, the space was divided among smaller tenants.

After the anchor tenants left, the mall decided to focus on off-price retailing after a 1983 renovation. Most of the former Woolco space was repurposed into an off-price clothing store called Winston's. In 1985, Jefferson Ward closed and the space temporarily became a Montgomery Ward clearance outlet.

In 1986, the mall was sold to James Schlesinger, Jim Levy, and Balcor Development. At the time, the mall had a 30% occupancy.

In 1987, the mall's name was changed to the Mall of the Americas following a renovation, and the mall now targeted a middle-class Latin American clientele. A new Home Depot replaced the former Winston's building. An eight-screen AMC Theatres multiplex was also built as part of the new mall.

In 1994, The mall was sold to RREEF Funds. The first Forever 21 outside of California opened in the mall in 1995.

In 2003, The Home Depot moved from its mall-connected space to a new building on the site of the now-demolished Winn-Dixie. In 2004, RREEF Funds sold the mall to its current owner, Sterling Organization.

In 2015, the north wing of the mall was demolished and replaced by a Costco that opened in 2017. The AMC Theatres section was also demolished after it closed.

In May 2022, the name of the mall was changed from Mall of the Americas to Midway Crossings. In 2024, an Aldi opened at the mall. In 2025, intentional plans to open a Macy's at the mall were announced, with the department store opening at the mall in 2026.
