= Florida State Road 922 =

Highway in Florida, US

Coordinates: 25.89066°N 80.17666°W

State Road 922
- Shepard Broad Causeway
- SR 922 highlighted in red

Route information
- Maintained by FDOT (Toll and bridge by Bay Harbor Islands)
- Length: 5.548 mi (8.929 km)
- Existed: 1951 (Causeway); 1983 (as SR 922)–present

Major junctions
- West end: US 441 in North Miami
- I-95 in North Miami; US 1 in North Miami
- East end: SR A1A in Surfside-Bal Harbour

Location
- Country: United States
- State: Florida
- Counties: Miami-Dade

Highway system
- Florida State Highway System; Interstate; US; State; Former; Pre‑1945; Toll; Scenic
← SR 916	→ SR 923

Florida State Road 922 (SR 922) is a 5.548 miles (8.929 km) east–west road built in 1951, passing through the cities of North Miami, Bay Harbor Islands, Surfside and Bal Harbour. Locally, the street is also known as Northwest 125th Street, North 125th Street, North Miami Boulevard, Northeast 123rd Street, Shepard Broad Causeway, 96th Street, and Kane Concourse. Its western terminus is an intersection with Northwest Seventh Avenue (US 441/SR 7), one block west of Interstate 95, its eastern terminus is an intersection with SR A1A. The street is an important commercial artery in northeastern Miami-Dade County, with stores lining much of the route, including the Bal Harbour Shops mall near its eastern terminus.

== Route description ==
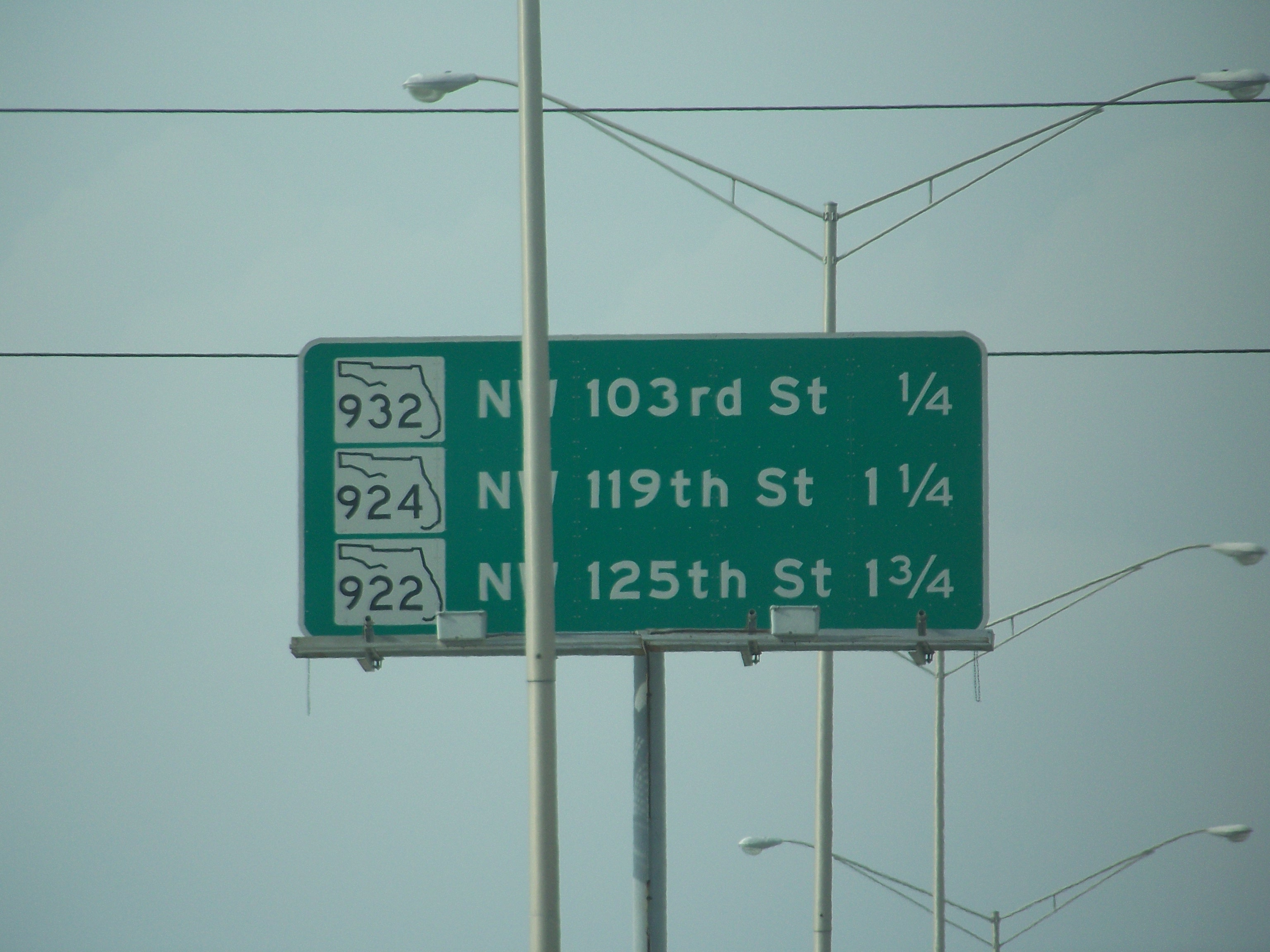
Signage for the route along Interstate 95

State Road 922 begins at the intersection between 125th Street and US 441/SR 7, with SR 922 heading east, intersecting with I-95 just one block east of the western terminus. East of I-95, SR 922 continues through mostly residential areas of North Miami, becoming commercial as it reaches the intersection with SR 909/SR 915. East of the intersection, SR 922 continues as a commercial thoroughfare until a railroad crossing jags SR 922 slightly south to become 123rd Street. It then meets with US 1/SR 5, and runs towards Biscayne Bay. Less than a mile east of US 1, State Road 922 crosses Biscayne Bay on the Shepard Broad Causeway, a toll causeway (with a drawbridge) maintained and operated by the Town of Bay Harbor Islands.

The SunPass toll rate for SR922 is $2.00 (US) for a two-axle vehicle and $3.25 via Toll-by-Plate. Additional axles at the SunPass rate are $7.00 per each additional axle and $8.50 for Toll-by-Plate.

East of the Causeway, SR 922 runs through Bay Harbor Islands' Kane Concourse and reaches the final barrier island holding Bal Harbour to the north & Surfside to the south. SR 922 via 96th Street terminates at SR A1A.

== History ==
The Broad Causeway opened in 1951, named after Shepard Broad.

Before a 1983 reassignment of Florida Department of Transportation designations, the route had signs indicating that it was State Road 968, its former number was transferred to another east–west street nine miles (14 km) to the south (Flagler Street).

In 2017, it was renamed to Shepard Broad Causeway by the Florida State Legislature.

== Major intersections ==
The entire route is in Miami-Dade County.

Location	mi	km	Destinations	Notes
North Miami	0.000	0.000	US 441 (Northwest 7th Avenue / SR 7)	Western terminus; road continues westward
North Miami	0.10	0.16	I-95 (SR 9A) – Fort Lauderdale, Downtown Miami, Miami International Airport	Exit 10A on I-95
North Miami	1.498	2.411	SR 909 north (West Dixie Highway)	
North Miami	1.520	2.446	SR 915 (Northeast 6th Avenue) to SR 909 south (West Dixie Highway)	
North Miami	2.961	4.765	US 1 (Biscayne Boulevard / SR 5)	
North Miami	3.741	6.021	Western end of state maintenance	
Biscayne Bay	4.2– 4.5	6.8– 7.2	Broad Causeway (SunPass, E-Pass, E-ZPass, Peach Pass, LeeWay, NC Quick Pass, PikePass, KTag, TollTag, or pay-by-plate)	
Bay Harbor Islands	4.546	7.316	Eastern end of state maintenance	
Surfside–Bal Harbour line	5.489	8.834	SR A1A south (Harding Avenue)	
Surfside–Bal Harbour line	5.548	8.929	SR A1A north (Collins Avenue / Bal Harbour Boulevard)	
1.000 mi = 1.609 km; 1.000 km = 0.621 mi: Electronic toll collection
