= Florida State Road 916 =

State highway in Florida, United States

State Road 916
- North 135th Street; Opa-locka Boulevard

Route information
- Maintained by FDOT
- Length: 10.253 mi (16.501 km)

Major junctions
- West end: SR 826 in Hialeah / Miami Lakes
- SR 9 in Opa-locka; US 441 in North Miami; I-95 in North Miami
- East end: US 1 in North Miami

Location
- Country: United States
- State: Florida
- Counties: Miami-Dade

Highway system
- Florida State Highway System; Interstate; US; State; Former; Pre‑1945; Toll; Scenic
← SR 915	→ SR 922

State Road 916 (SR 916), locally known as Northwest 138th Street, West 84th Street, North 135th Street, Opa-locka Boulevard, and Natural Bridge Road is a 10.253 miles (16.501 km) long east–west highway crossing northern Miami-Dade County, Florida. Its western terminus is at an interchange with Interstate 75 (I-75), the Palmetto Expressway (SR 826), and the Gratigny Parkway (SR 924) on the boundary between Hialeah and Miami Lakes, traveling east to Biscayne Boulevard (U.S. Route 1 (US 1)/SR 5).

== Route description ==
The road begins at an interchange with Interstate 75 (SR 93), the Palmetto Expressway (SR 826), and the Gratigny Parkway (SR 924). However, SR 916 only has access to the northbound Palmetto Expressway, and receives traffic from the southbound lanes of the expressway. State Road 916 heads east as a two lane road, first through residential areas alongside SR 924. Once SR 916 passes under SR 924, the road enters a commercial area/industrial park, and intersects State Road 823, gaining a lane east of the intersection, before striding the southern end of Opa-locka Airport in Opa-locka, providing access via Le Jeune Road (State Road 953). Just east of this intersection, SR 916 transitions back into suburban residential neighborhoods for the rest of the route, with business scattered throughout the road. Just east of Aswan Road, State Road 916 becomes a one-way pair for the next three miles, with westbound lanes one block north, as it crosses State Road 9, US 441/State Road 7, and I-95. The roads reunite four blocks east of I-95, with SR 916 continuing east, with intersections with State Road 915, State Road 909, before its eastern terminus according to FDOT maps, at Biscayne Boulevard (U.S. Route 1/SR 5) in North Miami.

As with SR 976 to the southwest, there is an ambiguity as to the location of the eastern terminus of SR 916. Florida Department of Transportation maps and literature indicate that SR 916 terminates at its intersection with Biscayne Boulevard; however, signs erected by FDOT near the intersection indicate that the State Road extends past US 1 to some point on the street that ends in a cul-de-sac a mile to the east.

== History ==
The significance of SR 916 to Miami-Dade County has diminished since the opening of the Gratigny Parkway in 1992, but it remains a major trans-county throughway.

== State Road 918 ==
State Road 918
- Location: Hialeah
- Length: 0.408 mi (657 m)

As West 84th Street/Northwest 138th Street continues west past the Palmetto Expressway overpass, the road transitions to State Road 918. SR 918 runs another 0.408 miles (0.657 km), crossing the Palmetto Canal and terminating at West 20th Avenue/Pal Med Avenue (SR 923 east) and Northwest 138th Street (SR 938 west).

== Major intersections ==
The entire route is in Miami-Dade County.

Location	mi	km	Destinations	Notes
Hialeah	0.000	0.000	West 20th Avenue/Pal Med Avenue (SR 923 east); West 84th Street/Northwest 138th Street (SR 938 west)	western terminus of SR 918
Hialeah	0.01	0.016	Palmetto Canal	
Hialeah–Miami Lakes line	0.000	0.000	eastern terminus of SR 918; western terminus of SR 916	
Hialeah–Miami Lakes line	0.01	0.016	SR 826 north	interchange
Hialeah–Miami Lakes line	0.02	0.032	West 20th Avenue (SR 863 south)	
Hialeah–Miami Lakes line	2.045	3.291	SR 823 (Northwest 57th Avenue-West 4th Avenue / Red Road) to SR 826 / SR 924	
Opa-locka	3.598	5.790	SR 953 south (Le Jeune Road / Northwest 42nd Avenue) – Opa-locka Executive Airport	
Opa-locka	4.078	6.563	Douglas/Le Jeune Connector	
Opa-locka	5.102	8.211	SR 9 (Northwest 27th Avenue / Unity Boulevard)	
North Miami	7.114	11.449	US 441 (Northwest 7th Avenue / SR 7)	
North Miami	7.21	11.60	I-95 (SR 9A) – Airport	Exit 10B on I-95
North Miami	8.637	13.900	SR 915 (Northeast 6th Avenue)	
North Miami	9.136	14.703	SR 909 (West Dixie Highway)	
North Miami	10.253	16.501	US 1 (Biscayne Boulevard / SR 5) – FIU Biscayne Bay Campus	Eastern terminus
1.000 mi = 1.609 km; 1.000 km = 0.621 mi
