= Flagler Street =

Main east-west road in Miami, Florida, United States

State Road 968
- Flagler Street
- SR 968 in red, other Flagler Street segments in blue

Route information
- Maintained by FDOT
- Length: 8.699 mi (14.000 km) Flagler Street extends 12.4 miles (20.0 km) total
- Existed: 1983 (as SR 968)–present

Major junctions
- West end: SR 973 in Fontainebleau
- US 441 in Miami
- East end: West 2nd Avenue in Miami

Location
- Country: United States
- State: Florida
- Counties: Miami-Dade

Highway system
- Florida State Highway System; Interstate; US; State; Former; Pre‑1945; Toll; Scenic
← SR 963	→ SR 969

Flagler Street is a 12.4-mile (20.0 km) main east–west road in Miami. Flagler Street is the latitudinal baseline that divides all the streets on the Miami-Dade County grid plan as north or south streets (the east-west division is along Miami Avenue). Flagler Street is named after industrialist Henry Flagler and serves as a major commercial east–west highway through central Miami-Dade County, with a mixture of residential neighborhoods (featuring apartment complexes) and strip malls, the commercial presence increasing as SR 968 approaches downtown Miami.

Between SR 973 (Galloway Road/West 87th Avenue) and West 2nd Avenue, Flagler Street is signed State Road 968 (SR 968).

== Route description ==
State Road 968 begins at Galloway Road in Fontainebleau, as it takes the six lane Flagler Street east through a mostly commercial area with residential housing dotting the street as it quickly approaches the Midway Crossings (formerly Mall of the Americas, formerly Midway Mall) to the north and the interchange with the Palmetto Expressway at the eastern end of the mall. Seven blocks east of the interchange, the road enters the city of Miami proper after crossing the Tamiami Canal one block west of the intersection with Milam Dairy Road and becomes a four lane road from here until reaching I-95. At NW 67th Court, the divided highway comes together as a four lane road continuing east, with business lining both sides of the street. Following Red Road (West 57th Avenue), it reaches Flagler Memorial Park to the north, as the road continues east through more businesses and apartment complexes. The road then intersects with LeJeune Road (West 42nd Avenue), which provides access to Miami International Airport, with SR 968 continuing east towards central Miami.

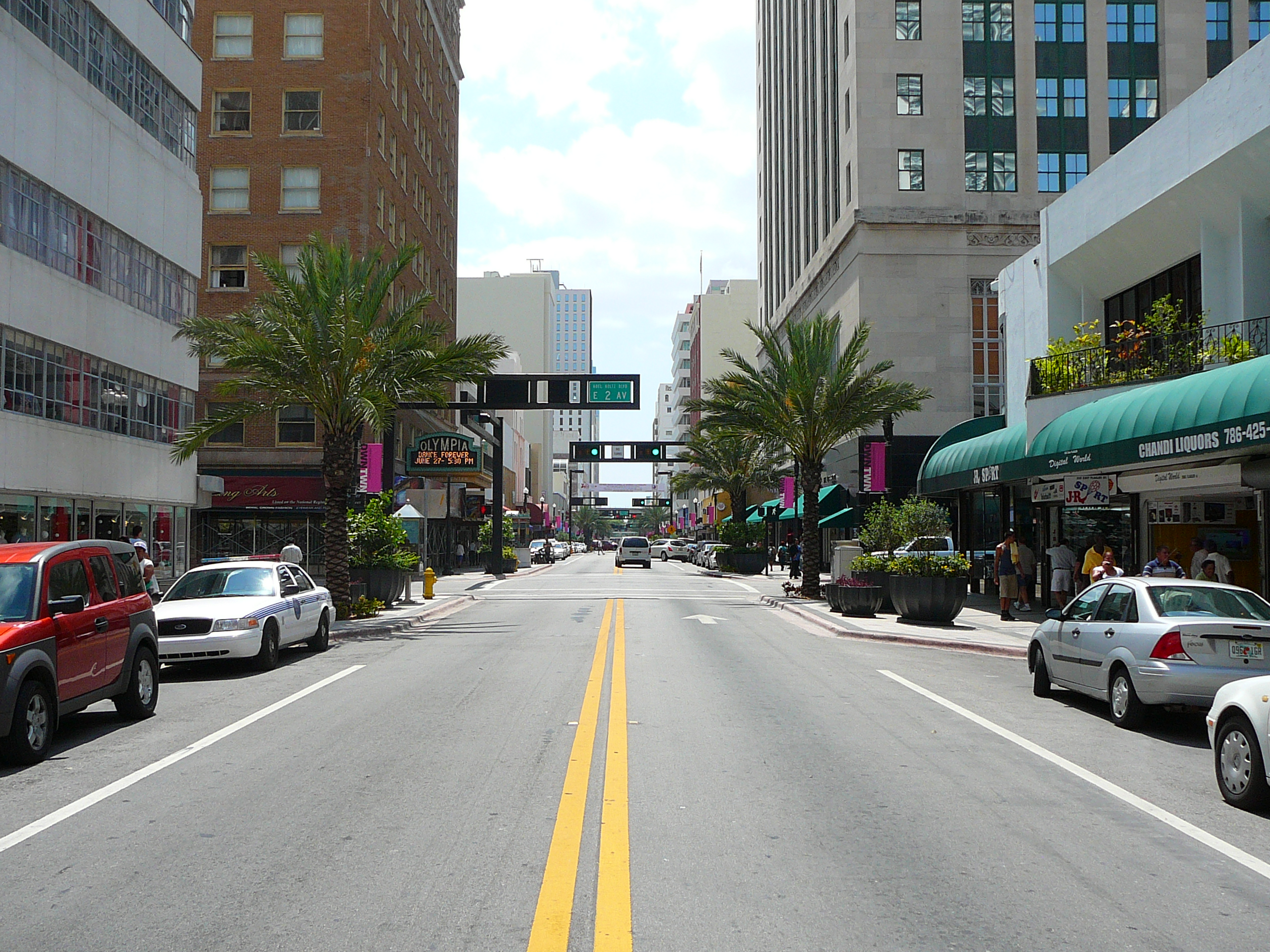
Flagler Street as it runs through the oldest part of Downtown Miami

At the northwest corner of the intersection with West 27th Avenue (SR 9) sits the Miami-Dade Auditorium concert hall, as Flagler Street continues east for three more blocks, until at NW 24th Avenue, the road becomes a one way pair, with Flagler Street going westbound, and SW 1st Street going eastbound and both roads featuring commercial businesses and parks. The road then intersects West 17th Avenue just a few blocks south of Marlins Park, as SR 968 enters Central Miami. From 12th Avenue West to the Miami River, Flagler Street features one eastbound lane with three westbound lanes, with the intersection with US 441/SR 7 (West 7th Street) just four blocks west of the Miami River drawbridges. Immediately after, it reaches I-95, with access via nearby streets. The rest of the road features government and business skyscrapers and metro rapid transit trackage towering over the road. At SW 2nd Avenue, SR 968 meets its eastern terminus, and Flagler Street (former SR 968) is once again a two-way street, with one lane in each direction. At Miami Avenue, Flagler Street forms the center of Miami, as Miami Avenue represents the baseline for east and west. The road becomes East Flagler Street as it continues through central Miami, terminating at Biscayne Boulevard (U.S. Route 1), with Bayfront Park, featuring a scenic view of Biscayne Bay just east of the end of Flagler Street.

Beyond SR 968's western terminus, West Flagler Street extends west to State Road 985 to end at an intersection with West 118th Avenue in Tamiami, just west of the Homestead Extension.

== History ==
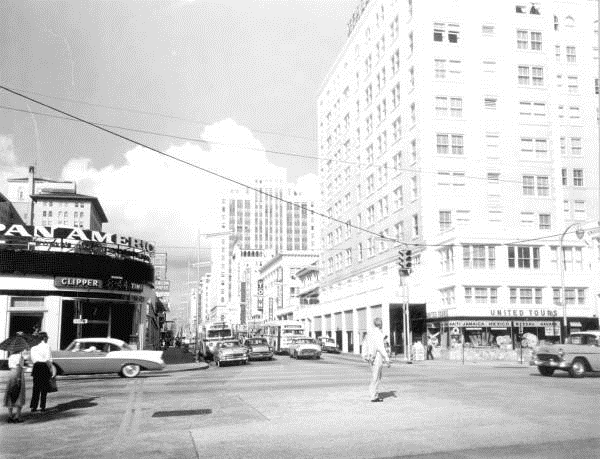
View westward at the intersection of Flagler Street and Biscayne Boulevard (US 1), 1958

Before the street was named Flagler Street, it was originally named 12th Street; it was renamed in 1920 after the establishment of the Challie Street Plan, a plan which renumbered Miami's streets to their current arrangement.

Formerly State Road 954, Flagler Street received its current Florida Department of Transportation designation in 1983, when FDOT reassigned route numbers to various streets in southeastern Florida and removed the SR 968 designation from North Miami Boulevard (now State Road 922).

SR 968's original western terminus was at an intersection with SR 985 (Avenue of the Americas/West 107th Avenue). In 1987, FDOT truncated the westernmost two miles of the route to its current configuration. SR 968's original eastern terminus was at Biscayne Boulevard (US 1) in Miami, until FDOT turned over the section between US 1 and SW 2nd Avenue to the city of Miami.

As a condition for the relinquishment of Brickell Avenue (US 1) to the city of Miami, FDOT plans to adopt both SE 1st Street and NE 1st Street in downtown Miami as part of SR 968 and re-connect the route to Biscayne Boulevard.

== Major intersections ==
The entire route is in Miami-Dade County.

Location	mi	km	Destinations	Notes
Fontainebleau	0.000	0.000	SR 973 (West 87th Avenue / Galloway Road)	Western terminus; Flagler Street continues westbound
Fontainebleau	0.99	1.59	SR 826 (Palmetto Expressway)	interchange
Miami	1.498	2.411	SR 969 north (West 72nd Avenue / Milam Dairy Road)	
Miami	3.018	4.857	SR 959 (West 57th Avenue / Red Road)	
Miami	4.551	7.324	SR 953 (West 42nd Avenue / LeJeune Road)	
Miami	6.089	9.799	SR 9 (West 27th Avenue / Unity Boulevard)	
Miami	7.640	12.295	SR 933 (West 12th Avenue)	
Miami	8.074	12.994	US 441 (West 8th Avenue / SR 7)	
Miami	8.51	13.70	First Street Bridge (eastbound) / Flagler Street Bridge (westbound) over Miami River	
Miami	8.64	13.90	SR 925 (Northwest 3rd Avenue) to I-95	westbound access only
Miami	8.699	14.000	West 2nd Avenue	east end of state maintenance
1.000 mi = 1.609 km; 1.000 km = 0.621 mi

== See also ==
- Downtown Miami
- Brickell
- Brickell Avenue
- Miami Avenue
- Biscayne Boulevard
- Transportation in South Florida

== Gallery ==
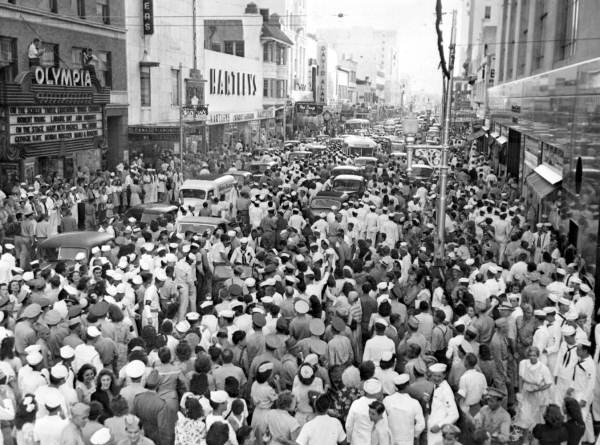
Flagler Street on August 15, 1945, 20 minutes after the announcement of Japan's surrender at the end of World War II.

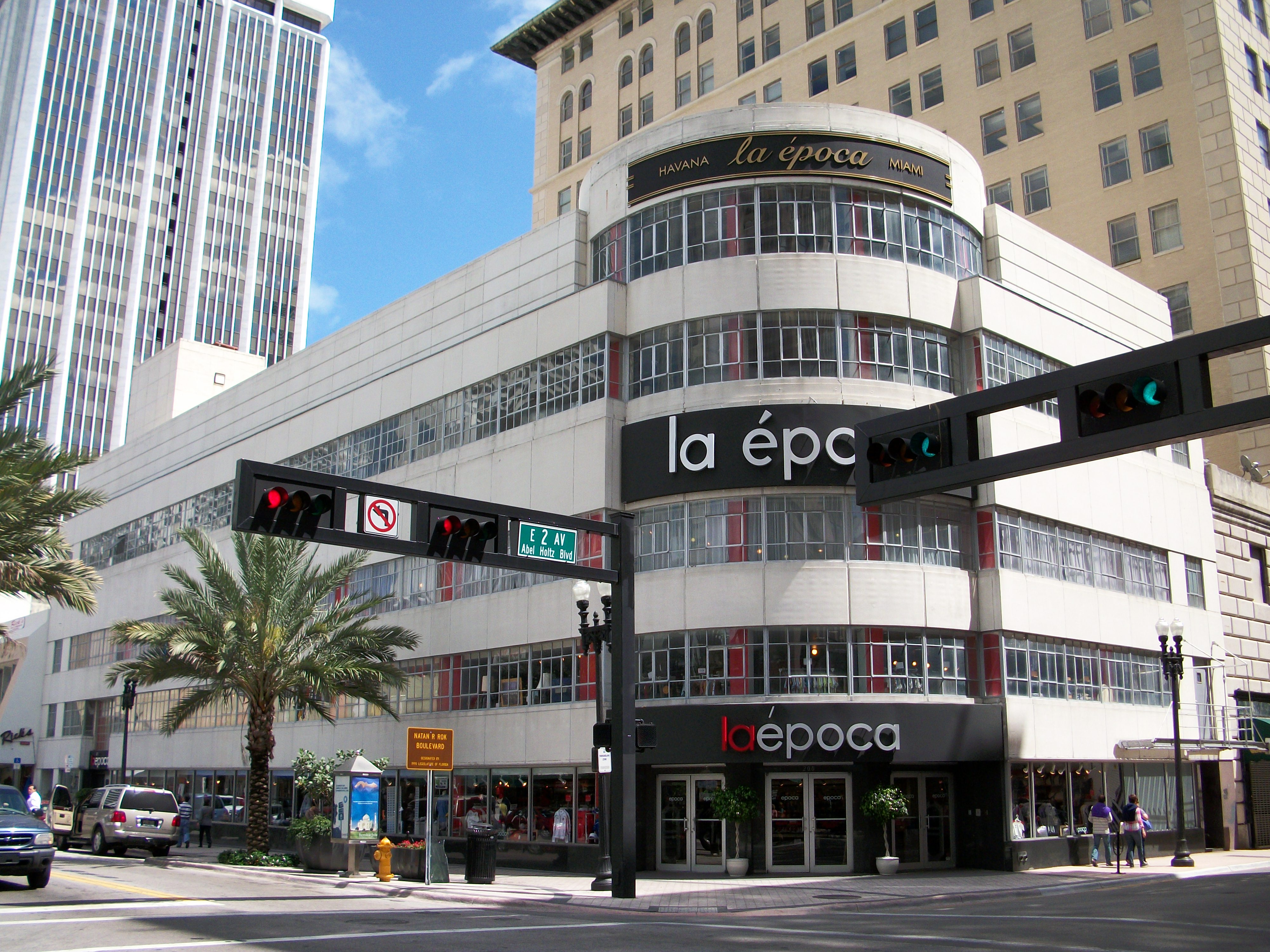
La Época Department Store, a local Miami department store in the historic 1930s Walgreens Building at 200 E Flagler Street

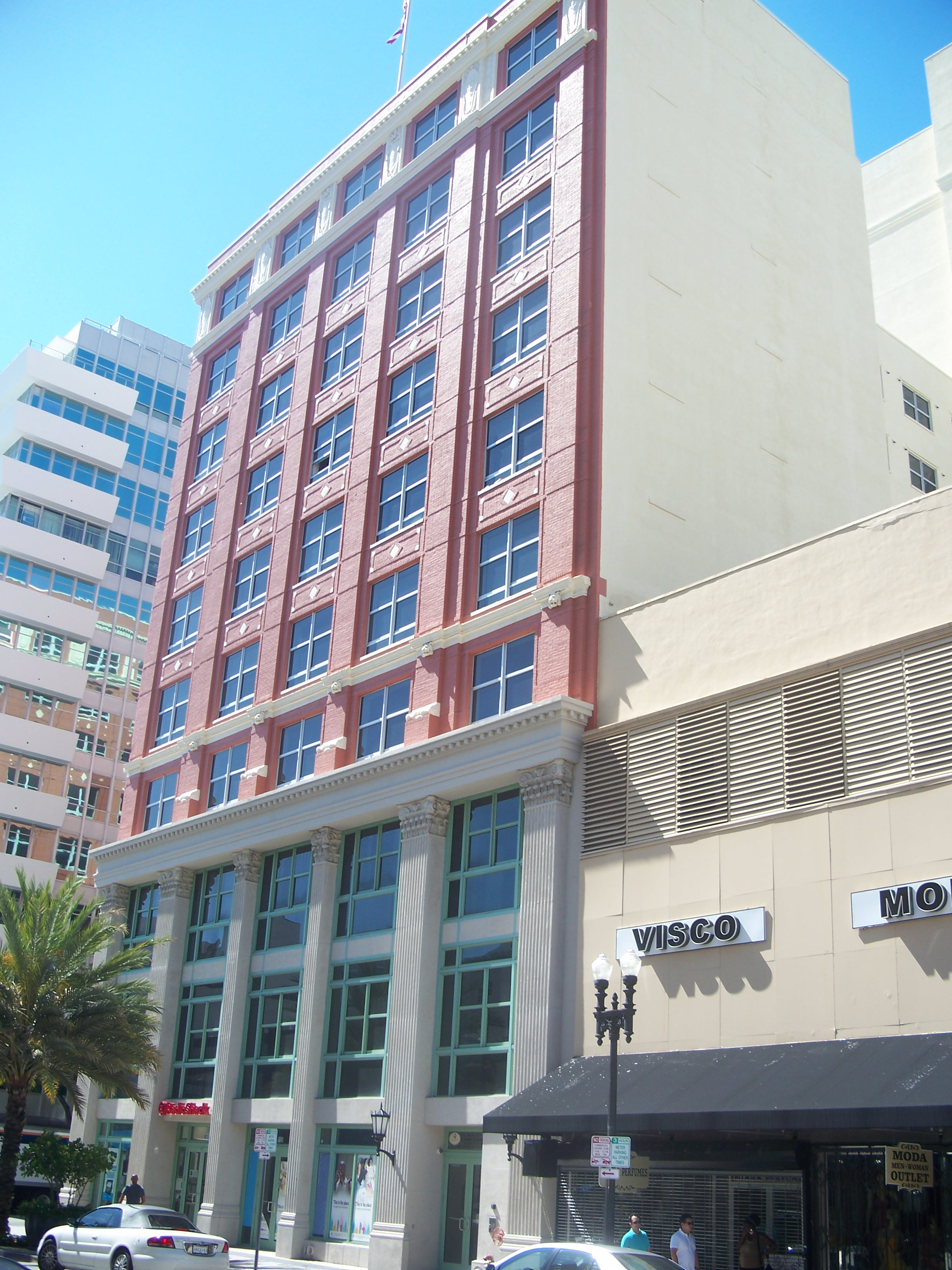
101 East Flagler Street

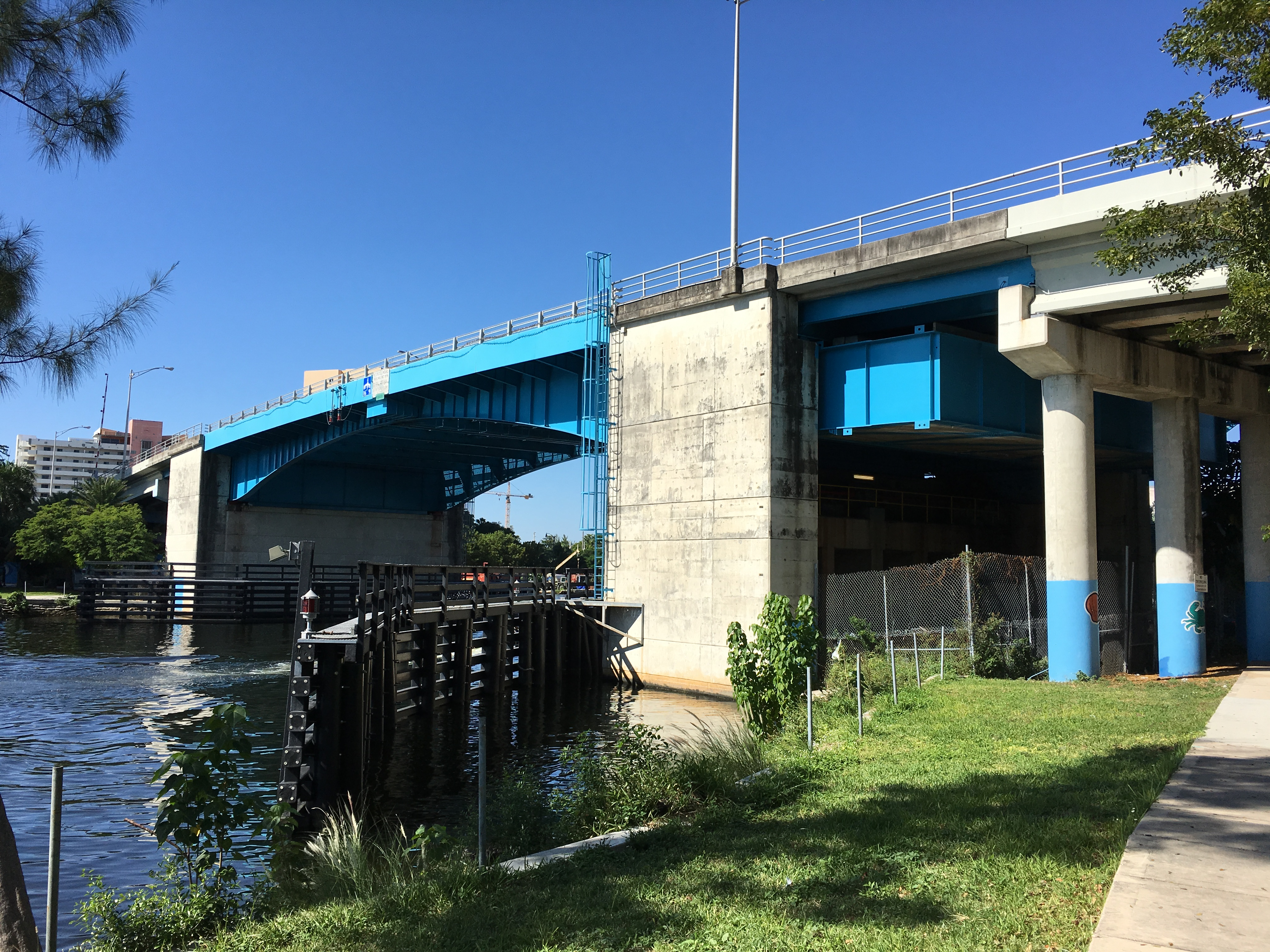
The Flagler Street Bridge over the Miami River is a drawbridge.
