= Florida State Road 932 =

State highway in Florida, United States

State Road 932
- North 103rd Street
- SR 932 highlighted in red

Route information
- Maintained by FDOT
- Length: 9.700 mi (15.611 km)

Major junctions
- West end: US 27 in Hialeah Gardens
- SR 953 in Hialeah; US 441 in Pinewood; I-95 near Pinewood
- East end: SR 915 in Miami Shores

Location
- Country: United States
- State: Florida
- Counties: Miami-Dade

Highway system
- Florida State Highway System; Interstate; US; State; Former; Pre‑1945; Toll; Scenic
← SR 929	→ SR 933

A major east–west commercial artery in northern Miami-Dade County, State Road 932 (SR 932) is a 9.7-mile-long (15.6 km) four-lane highway connecting U.S. Route 27 (US 27) in Hialeah Gardens and SR 915 in Miami Shores, just south of the campus of Barry University. Locally, SR 932 is also known as North 103rd Street in greater Miami, and as 49th Street or Palm Springs Mile in Hialeah.

== Route description ==
The western portion of SR 932 in Hialeah Gardens and Hialeah from US 27 to SR 823 is almost completely lined with commercial establishments (next to its interchange with the Palmetto Expressway (SR 826) is Westland Mall, one of the oldest enclosed shopping centers in Florida; across the street is Miami Dade College – Hialeah Campus). East of Red Road/SR 823 (West 4th Avenue in Hialeah), SR 932 is almost entirely lined with suburban developments, crossing the Miami Canal, passing by Medley, and ending at SR 915. Liberty City and Biscayne Park are within a quarter mile of the eastern terminus.

== History ==
Originally State Road 850, SR 932 received its current designation from the Florida Department of Transportation in 1983 as part of a statewide reassignment of state road numbers.

State Road 932’s connection with the Palmetto Expressway has similarly evolved from a little-used at-grade intersection in the early-1960s to a diamond interchange in the 1970s that was often overwhelmed in the 1990s and augmented by a flyover ramp in the 2000s. In contrast to the now-congested western end, the eastern end of SR 932 hasn’t seen significant change in traffic since the 1960s.

== Major intersections ==
The entire route is in Miami-Dade County.

Location	mi	km	Destinations	Notes
Hialeah Gardens	0.000	0.000	US 27 (Okeechobee Road / SR 25)	Western terminus
Hialeah Gardens–Hialeah line	1.15	1.85	SR 826 – Airport	interchange
Hialeah	3.150	5.069	SR 823 (West 4th Avenue / Red Road)	
Hialeah	4.647	7.479	SR 953 (East 8th Avenue / Le Jeune Road)	
West Little River	6.159	9.912	SR 9 (Northwest 27th Avenue / Unity Boulevard) – MDC North Campus	
Pinewood	8.199	13.195	US 441 (Northwest 7th Avenue / SR 7)	
	8.29	13.34	I-95 (SR 9A) – Fort Lauderdale, Downtown Miami, Miami International Airport	Exit 8B on I-95
Miami Shores	9.700	15.611	SR 915 (Northeast 6th Avenue)	Eastern teminus
1.000 mi = 1.609 km; 1.000 km = 0.621 mi
