= Florida State Road 970 =

Highway in Florida

State Road 970
- Downtown Distributor

Route information
- Maintained by FDOT
- Length: 0.563 mi (906 m)
- Existed: 1968–present

Major junctions
- West end: I-95 in Miami
- East end: US 1 in Miami

Location
- Country: United States
- State: Florida
- Counties: Miami-Dade

Highway system
- Florida State Highway System; Interstate; US; State; Former; Pre‑1945; Toll; Scenic
| ← SR 969 | → SR 972 |

State Road 970 (SR 970), also known as the Downtown Distributor, is a short 0.563-mile (0.906 km) elevated freeway connecting Interstate 95 and Biscayne Boulevard in Downtown Miami. As of June 20, 2014, the entirety of the road cosigns with US 1/SR 5.

== Route description ==
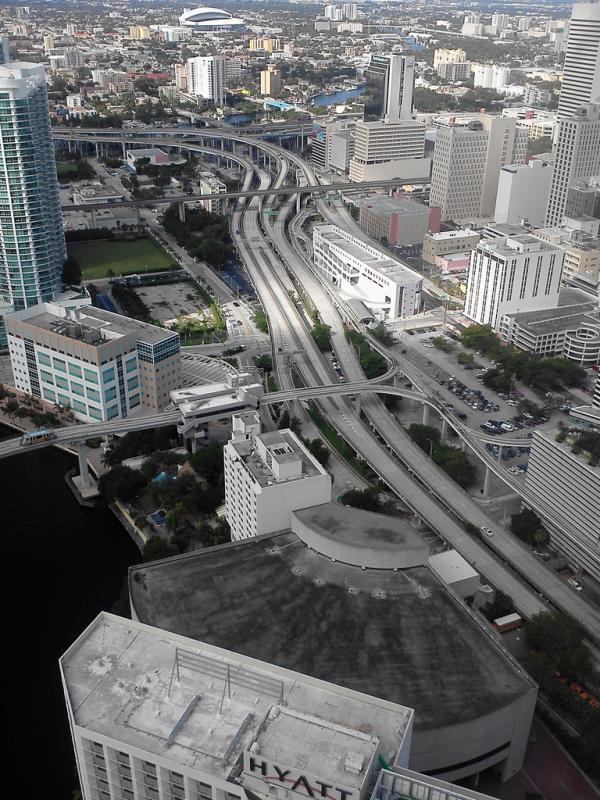
Aerial view in 2011

The expressway is two lanes wide in each direction, and had an annual average daily traffic volume of 34,000 according to a 2007 report, with an estimated volume of 37,500 in 2015.

In addition to the entrance and exit at US 1, SR 970 also has entrance and exit ramps at Miami Avenue, three blocks to the west. Eastbound drivers also can exit to SE 1st Avenue near the James L. Knight Center and the Miami Tower.

This route is mostly unsigned. On the Interstate, there is no recognition of the State Road status of the Downtown Distributor, as exit signs in both directions indicate "Biscayne Boulevard, US 1". On the Distributor, both at the eastern end and roughly 0.2-mile (0.32 km) from the Interstate, State Road 970 shields are present, but without directional indicators.

== History ==
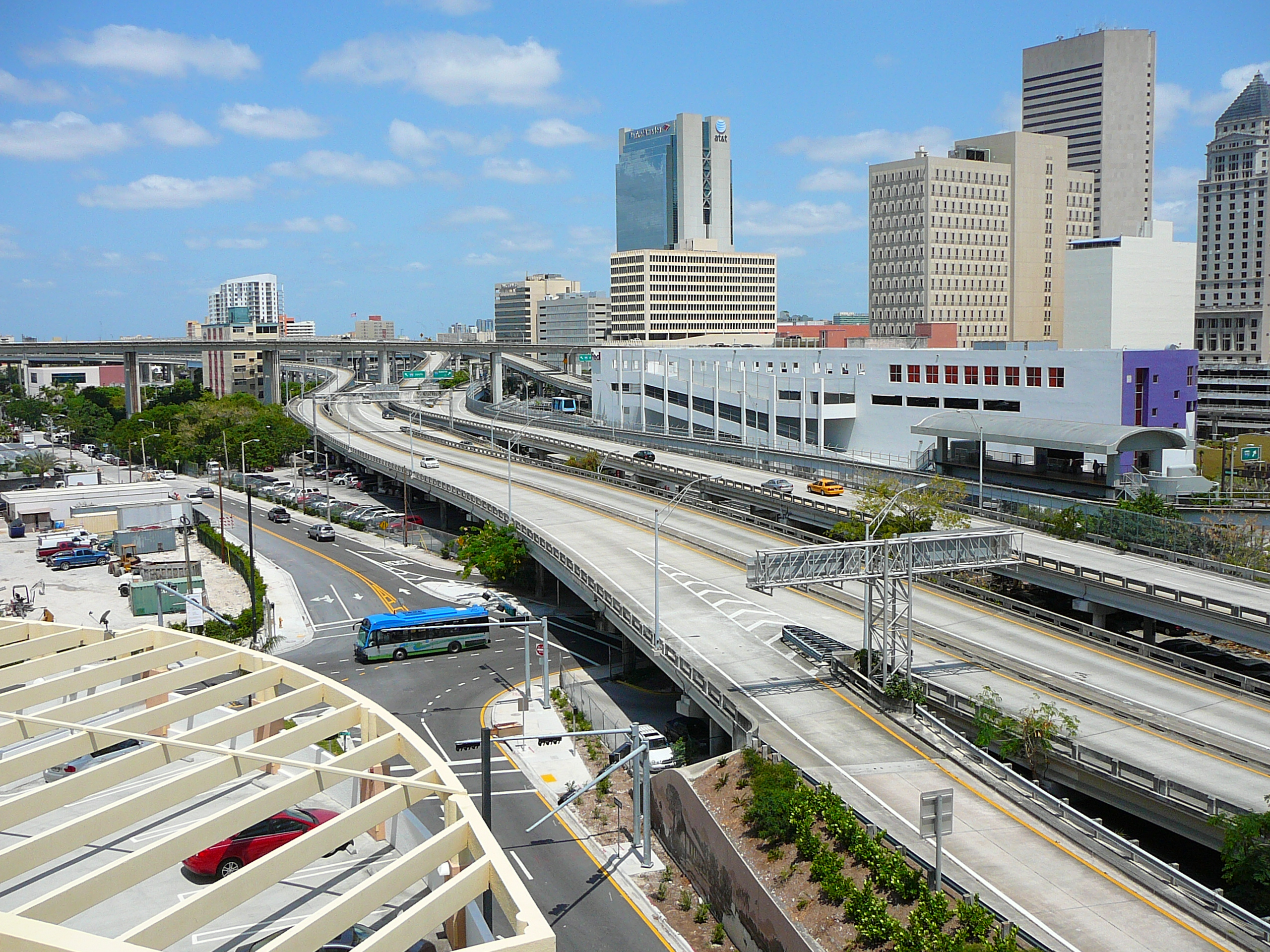
The Downtown Distributor in May 2008

The Downtown Distributor opened simultaneously with the adjacent stretch of I-95 in 1968.

The freeway was to be the start of the Bayshore Loop around Downtown Miami in 1956, running along what is now U.S. Highway 1 and Interstate 395.

== Exit list ==
The entire route is in Miami, Miami-Dade County.

| mi | km | Destinations | Notes |
|---|---|---|---|
| 0.000 | 0.000 | I-95 – Airport | Exit 2A on I-95 |
| 0.4 | 0.64 | Miami Avenue – Downtown | Eastbound exit from I-95 exit 2C and westbound entrance |
| 0.5 | 0.80 | Southeast 1st Avenue | Eastbound exit (from I-95 north only) and westbound entrance |
| 0.563 | 0.906 | US 1 (Southeast 2nd Avenue) / Southeast 3rd Street to Brickell Avenue / Biscayne Boulevard | At-grade intersection; continues as SE 3rd Street |
1.000 mi = 1.609 km; 1.000 km = 0.621 mi: Incomplete access
