= Florida State Road 934 =

Highway in Florida

State Road 934
- North 79th Street; John F. Kennedy Causeway

Route information
- Maintained by FDOT
- Length: 13.112 mi (21.102 km)
- Existed: 1983–present

Major junctions
- West end: SR 826 in Medley
- SR 823 in Hialeah; US 441 in Miami; I-95 in Miami; US 1 in Miami
- East end: SR A1A in Miami Beach

Location
- Country: United States
- State: Florida
- Counties: Miami-Dade

Highway system
- Florida State Highway System; Interstate; US; State; Former; Pre‑1945; Toll; Scenic
← SR 933	→ SR 938

State Road 934 (SR 934) runs for 13.1 miles (21.1 km) from State Road 826 (Palmetto Expressway) in Medley to SR A1A in Miami Beach. It is a major east–west highway in the Miami metropolitan area.

State Road 934 is, for its longest span, Northwest 79th Street in Miami, but also traverses a variety of names as it crosses Hialeah Gardens, Hialeah, North Bay Village, and Miami Beach as Northeast 74th Street, the Hialeah Expressway and 21st Street in Hialeah, as the North 79th/81st Street one-way pair in Miami, the John F. Kennedy Causeway as it crosses Biscayne Bay, and as Normandy Drive and 71st Street in North Beach, Miami Beach (the last two forming a one-way pair in Miami Beach, respectively).

== Route description ==
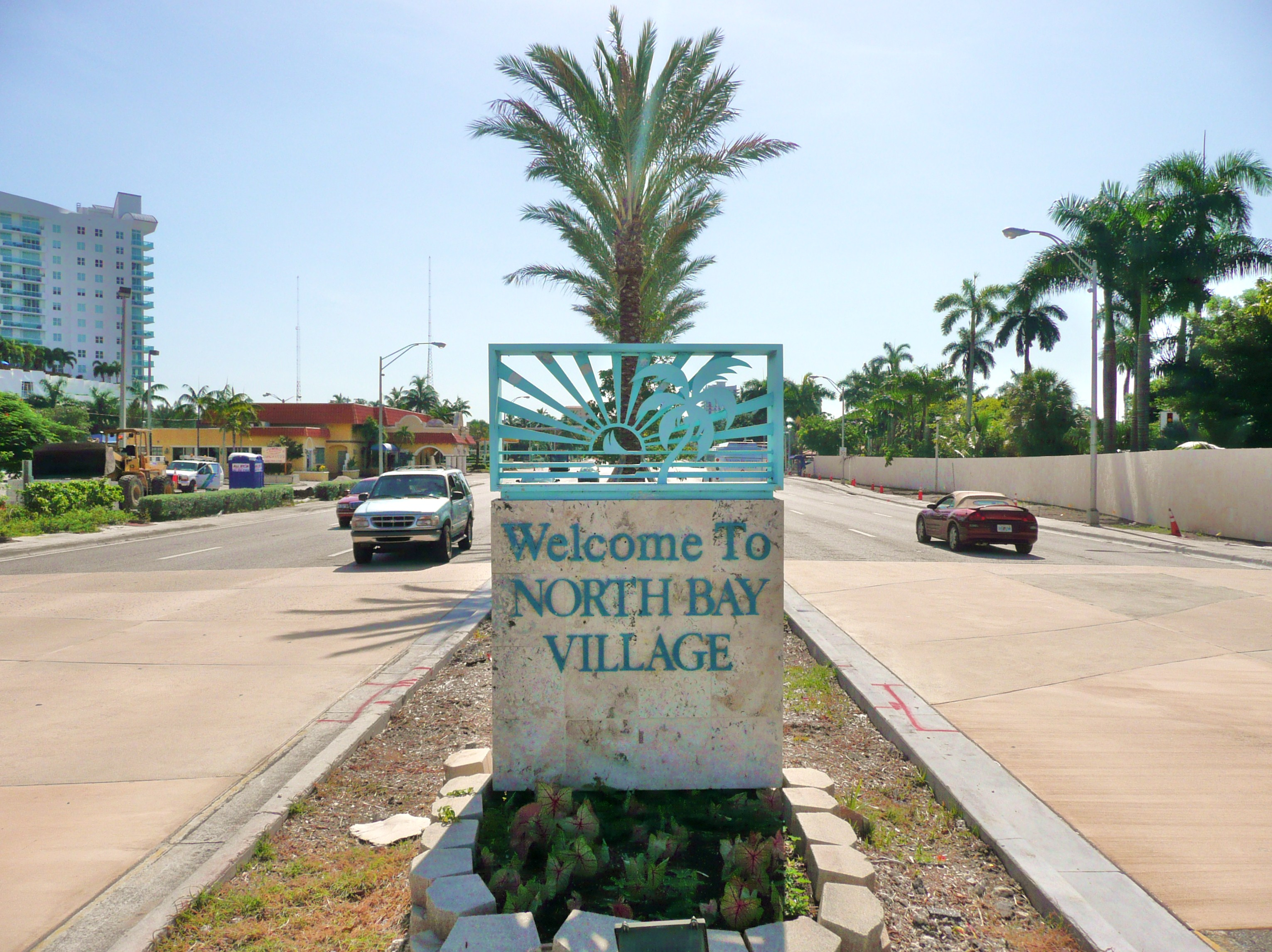
State Road 934 eastbound as the John F. Kennedy Causeway as it enters North Bay Village.

State Road 934 begins at the Palmetto Expressway in Medley. About two blocks east of the expressway, it crosses Milam Dairy Road/West 72nd Avenue, becoming the Hialeah Expressway, a limited access stretch of highway that extends to US 27 (SR 25), and ends at Red Road (West 4th Avenue, SR 823). The Okeechobee Metrorail station is located one block south of SR 934 on US 27. The expressway, however, does not have any complete interchanges; it is made up of at-grade intersections at each end of the expressway and between them, they consist of a single westbound off ramp onto North 74th Street near West 69th Avenue, a half diamond with US 27 and an at-grade intersection with West 12th Avenue. Signage along Hialeah Expressway is minimal as only the westbound off ramp onto US 27 (Okeechobee Road) has a sign with the destination street on it.

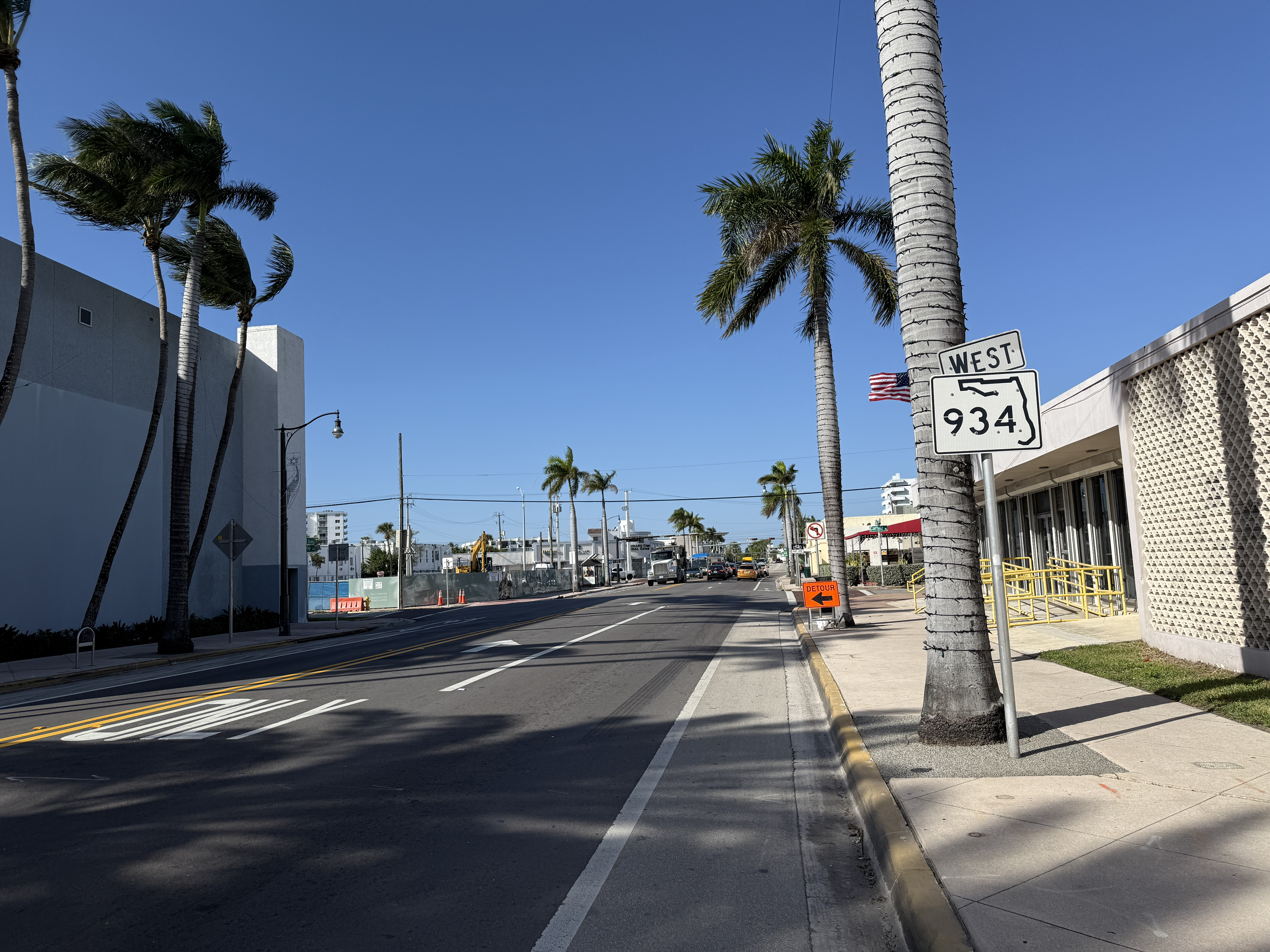
SR 934 westbound in Miami Beach

East of Red Road, the road continues east, passing by the Hialeah Metrorail station and the Hialeah Park Race Track on the north side of the road. At East 4th Avenue in Hialeah, SR 934 tracks north for four blocks around the park before resuming its east–west orientation, where it passes the Hialeah Hospital and intersects with SR 953. The road continues east, with the Metrorail line in the center section of the road until just west of West 27th Avenue (SR 9). Just east of West 14th Avenue, SR 934 becomes a one way pair, with three eastbound lanes and a westbound lane on 79th Street, mainly as a business loops and a truck route, and two westbound lanes on 81st Street, which has no businesses on the road and does not allow trucks. The one way pairs then intersect with West 7th Avenue (SR 441)/SR 7 and I-95, before 81st Street spurs north to become 82nd Street. After intersecting US 1/SR 5, the roads rejoin just west of the western end of Biscayne Bay and the John F. Kennedy Causeway. The causeway crosses four islands and has two drawbridges. On the Isle of Normandy, the road becomes a one way pair again before it reaches the end of the causeway to Miami Beach, where it ends at SR A1A.

West of the terminus, the road continues as NW 74th Street, extending west through residential streets to Galloway Road (West 87th Avenue) in Medley, and west of that intersection going through an undeveloped section of northwest Miami-Dade county to end at an intersection with the Homestead Extension of Florida's Turnpike (HEFT).

== History ==
The SR 934 designation was assigned to the road in 1983; prior to that, the portion between Interstate 95 (SR 9A) and SR A1A was signed State Road 828.

NW 74th Street was extended from NW 87th Avenue west to the Homestead Extension of the Turnpike, opening in the Spring of 2010.

== Major intersections ==
The entire route is in Miami-Dade County.

Location	mi	km	Destinations	Notes
Medley	0.000	0.000	SR 826 – Airport	
	0.582	0.937	SR 969 south (Northwest 72nd Avenue / Milam Dairy Road)	North end of SR 969
	0.86	1.38	Northwest 69th Avenue	Interchange; westbound exit and eastbound entrance
Hialeah	1.21	1.95	US 27 north	Former interchange (westbound exit and eastbound entrance)
Hialeah	2.118	3.409	SR 823 (West 4th Avenue / Red Road)	
Hialeah	3.849	6.194	SR 953 (East 8th Avenue / Northwest 42nd Avenue / Le Jeune Road)	
	5.374	8.649	SR 9 (Northwest 27th Avenue / Unity Boulevard)	
Miami	7.403	11.914	US 441 (Northwest 7th Avenue)	
Miami	7.50	12.07	I-95 – Fort Lauderdale, Downtown Miami, Miami International Airport	Exit 7 on I-95
Miami	8.937	14.383	US 1 (Biscayne Boulevard)	
Biscayne Bay	9.683– 9.870	15.583– 15.884	John F. Kennedy Causeway (west span)	
Biscayne Bay	11.385– 11.583	18.322– 18.641	John F. Kennedy Causeway (east span)	
Miami Beach	13.055	21.010	SR A1A south (Abbott Avenue)	
Miami Beach	13.112	21.102	SR A1A north (Collins Avenue)	
1.000 mi = 1.609 km; 1.000 km = 0.621 mi: Incomplete access
