= Florida State Road 924 =

Highway in Florida

State Road 924
- Gratigny Parkway
- SR 924 highlighted in red

Route information
- Maintained by GMX and FDOT
- Length: 8.490 mi (13.663 km) 4.606 miles (7.413 km) freeway
- Existed: 1992–present

Major junctions
- West end: I-75 / SR 826 in Miami Lakes
- US 441 in North Miami; I-95 near North Miami
- East end: SR 909 near North Miami

Location
- Country: United States
- State: Florida
- Counties: Miami-Dade

Highway system
- Florida State Highway System; Interstate; US; State; Former; Pre‑1945; Toll; Scenic
← SR 923	→ SR 925

State Road 924 (SR 924) is an 8.5-mile (13.7 km) east–west highway connecting I-75 and SR 826 (Palmetto Expressway) in Hialeah and SR 909 (West Dixie Highway) in North Miami. The westernmost 4.85 miles (west of West 32nd Avenue), named Gratigny Parkway (or simply, the Gratigny), (Note: /ˈɡrætɪni/ GRAT-in-ee) is a controlled-access toll road maintained by the Greater Miami Expressway Agency (totalling to two gantries of $0.47 each for SunPass users and $0.94 each for toll-by-plate users); the easternmost 3.6 miles (5.8 km) is a surface street (Northwest 119th Street) also known as Gratigny Road. Despite its relatively short length, SR 924 is a major east–west artery in northern Miami-Dade County.

== Route description ==
The road begins at the national southern terminus of Interstate 75 at the Palmetto Expressway at the border between Miami Lakes and Hialeah. The road heads east as an eight lane expressway through Hialeah's residential areas and through the first of two $0.47 toll gantries ($0.94 for toll-by-plate users). Following the gantry, the expressway has its first interchange with NW 57th Avenue/Red Road, giving access to Opa-locka Airport just north of the toll road. SR 924 then curves southeast, leaving Hialeah and heading towards the second $0.47 toll gantry ($0.94 for toll-by-plate users) in Opa-locka, followed by an interchange with SR 953 before the expressway ends at NW 32nd Avenue, becoming NW 119th Street, a divided surface street heading due east. The road then becomes a mix of commercial and residential areas as it crosses SR 9, then reaching North Miami, intersecting with U.S. Route 441/SR 7, followed by Interstate 95, becoming a residential street before ending at SR 909.

== Tolls ==
The tolls on the expressway portion of SR 924 are all electronic, and does not accept cash. Payment is done either via SunPass transponders or via toll-by-plate billing, the latter of which attracts a higher cost. Two toll gantries are located along the expressway portion of the road, each charging $0.47 for SunPass users and $0.94 for Toll By Plate users. The eastern toll gantry is placed at the location of the former toll plaza which closed in 2010 when cash collection ended. As of June 8, 2018, it costs $0.94 to travel the entire expressway portion via SunPass and $1.88 via Toll By Plate. All motorists are charged at least one toll for using the road; there are no "free sections" as existed prior to the electronic toll conversion in 2010.

== History ==
Despite appearances, the Gratigny Parkway isn't an outgrowth of an attempt to extend I-75 to connect with I-95. Initial plans for the Gratigny were devised in the 1960s, when planners had hoped to route I-75 along Tamiami Trail and the then-under construction "east–west Expressway" that opened (in 1969) as SR 836 and eventually became known as the Dolphin Expressway. When plans for the major north–south Interstate changed so it would be routed along Alligator Alley instead, the proposed Opa-locka Expressway was intended to be Miami-Dade County's second full east–west throughway.

The Opa-locka Expressway was never intended to terminate at I-95, but merge with a surface street within a few blocks of it instead. Funding issues caused the Florida Department of Transportation to mothball its construction plans for over a decade, but when the plan was revived, the changing demographics of the neighborhoods impacted by construction (an area with a predominantly white population in the 1960s became an area with a predominantly African-American and Hispanic population in the 1980s). In 1982, racial politics killed the portion of the Opa-locka Expressway that was planned for east of Northwest 32nd Avenue, and the proposed new expressway received a new name: the Gratigny Parkway.

Faced with rising construction costs in 1982, FDOT officials told the North Dade Chamber of Commerce that the Gratigny Parkway would be built as a toll road; and in the following year, the construction project was given a green light.

In 1984, increased opposition almost derailed construction of the expressway again, but this time the resistance came from residents of Miami Lakes and Hialeah. Both communities didn't want any expressways to be built, even to the point of Hialeah amending its city charter to oppose all expressway construction within its city limits. Yet at that point, FDOT had already purchased 90% of the land needed for construction of the Gratigny Parkway - and it was determined to get it built. After a compromise that deleted one interchange with a major surface street (Ludlam Road/Northwest 67th Avenue), construction finally began in 1987.

The Gratigny Parkway opened to traffic in January 1992. At the time, no signs indicated the name of the toll road: they merely showed the SR 924 designation that it shared with Gratigny Road to the east. In 1997, the newly established Miami-Dade Expressway Authority (now Greater Miami Expressway Agency) took over the operation from FDOT. New TOLL shields (with the MDX (now GMX) logo underneath them) made their appearance along the expressway but not the surface road to the east of 32nd Ave; the corner of Northwest 119th Street at 32nd Ave has an GMX "end 924" sign for the eastbound drivers, while on the other side of 32nd Ave an FDOT "east SR 924" sign greets people who wish to continue eastward on the surface street. In 1998, the expressway section of SR 924 was designated as the Marlins Expressway by the state of Florida to honor the Florida Marlins' 1997 World Series victory.

On June 7, 2010, the tolled section of SR 924 ceased collecting cash tolls and went completely electronic, with SunPass users paying the same rate as before, but those without SunPass have to utilize the toll-by-plate program, which adds a 15 cent surcharge to every gantry they pass. By 2014, the cost to drive on the expressway is double on the Toll By Plate system compared to SunPass.

== Major intersections ==
The entire route is in Miami-Dade County.

Location	mi	km	Exit	Destinations	Notes
Miami Lakes	0.000	0.000		I-75 north – Naples	Continuation north
Miami Lakes	0.000	0.000	1	SR 826 (Palmetto Expressway) – Miami	Signed as exits 1B (south) and 1A (north); exit nos. correspond to I-75
Miami Lakes–Hialeah line				Northwest 67th Avenue / Ludlam Road	Proposed partial interchange; Would be all movements except eastbound exit
Hialeah	1.2	1.9	Toll Gantry		
Hialeah	2.020	3.251		SR 823 (Northwest 57th Avenue / Red Road)	Unsigned access to SR 916 (Graham Dairy Road)
	2.9	4.7	Toll Gantry		
Opa-locka	4.095	6.590		SR 953 south (Northwest 42nd Avenue / Le Jeune Road) / Northwest 37th Avenue North	
Westview	4.606	7.413	Eastern end of freeway section		
Westview	5.378	8.655		SR 9 (Northwest 27th Avenue / Unity Boulevard)	East end of GMX maintenance, west end of state maintenance
North Miami	7.399	11.908		US 441 (Northwest 7th Avenue)	
	7.50	12.07		I-95 – Downtown Miami, Miami International Airport, Fort Lauderdale	Exit 9 on I-95
	8.490	13.663		SR 909 north (West Dixie Highway)	South end of SR 909
1.000 mi = 1.609 km; 1.000 km = 0.621 mi: Electronic toll collection
