= Biscayne Park, Florida =

- Village
- Village of Biscayne Park
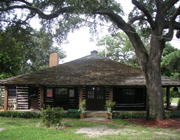
- The historic, Biscayne Park Village Hall, a log cabin that serves as commission chambers for all meetings, as well as other board meetings, and community events.

- Seal

- Location in Miami-Dade County and the state of Florida

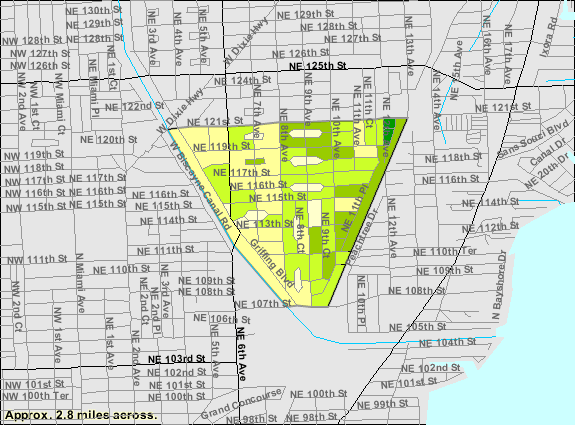
- U.S. Census Bureau map showing village boundaries
- Coordinates: 25°52′41″N 80°10′51″W
- Country: United States
- State: Florida
- County: Miami-Dade
- Settled (Griffing Tropical Nurseries and Groves): 1903
- Platted (Griffing Biscayne Park Estates): 1921
- Miami neighborhood (Biscayne Park Estates): September 8, 1925
- Incorporated (Town of Biscayne Park): December 31, 1931
- Incorporated (Village of Biscayne Park): June 16, 1933
- Reincorporated (Village of Biscayne Park): December 1, 1933

Government
  - Type: Council-Manager
  - Mayor: Jonathan E. Groth
  - Vice Mayor: Dan Samaria
  - Commissioners: Veronica Amsler, Art Gonzalez, and Ryan Huntington
  - Village Manager: Albert P. Childress
  - Village Clerk: Pamela Latimore

Area
  - Total: 0.64 sq mi (1.65 km^{2})
  - Land: 0.62 sq mi (1.61 km^{2})
  - Water: 0.019 sq mi (0.05 km^{2})
- Elevation: 7 ft (2.1 m)

Population (2020)
  - Total: 3,117
  - Density: 5,028.4/sq mi (1,941.47/km^{2})
- Time zone: UTC-5 (EST)
  - Summer (DST): UTC-4 (EDT)
- ZIP Code: 33161
- Area codes: 305, 786, 645
- FIPS code: 12-06600
- GNIS feature ID: 2407420
- Website: www.biscayneparkfl.gov

Biscayne Park is a village in Miami-Dade County, Florida, United States. It's also part of the Miami metropolitan area of South Florida. As of the 2020 census, the population was at 3,117 residents.

== History ==
In 1903, Biscayne Park's first settler was a horticulturalist named Arthur Mertlow Griffing, who decided to move from Norwich, New York to the area, calling it "Griffing Tropical Nurseries and Groves". He grew crops such as tomatoes on his farm, and tropical plants in his nursery. In 1921, after working as a landscaper for Carl Fisher, he decided to become a real estate developer. That same year he began developing all of his land from his former farm and nursery into residential subdivisions, naming it "Griffing Biscayne Park Estates". Despite his farm and nursery being within the current village boundary, his home was on 7 acres (2.8 ha) of land located outside of Biscayne Park, in North Miami, which is now a strip mall called Colonial Shopping Center along Dixie Highway and 125th Street.

Early in January 1923, Griffing began advertising the newly platted land in The Miami Metropolis, and it was annexed into the city of Miami as one of its neighborhoods called Biscayne Park Estates on September 8, 1925. Because of the Great Depression in the United States, Miami couldn't afford the cost of some areas and neighborhoods it had acquired via annexation, and Biscayne Park was one of the places to get disincorporated. When it was no longer a Miami neighborhood, 113 of Biscayne Park's residents voted to incorporate it as the Town of Biscayne Park, and it officially became a municipality on December 31, 1931. On June 16, 1933, the town decided to become a village, and changed its name to the Village of Biscayne Park. When the municipal charter reincorporated it on December 1, 1933, the village government and its residents kept the same name and municipality type.

On February 1, 1933, with the ongoing Great Depression, and under Franklin Roosevelt's first administration's New Deal, the village hall was being built as a log cabin made from Dade County pine by the Works Progress Administration. The labor was funded by the Federal Emergency Relief Program, and on January 24, 1935, the construction was finished. Since then, the village government has continued to use it for meetings and community events.

== Geography ==
Biscayne Park is located 9 miles (14 km) north of downtown Miami. It is bordered to the north by the city of North Miami and to the south by the village of Miami Shores. The Biscayne Canal forms the southwest border of the village, and the Florida East Coast Railway forms the southeast border.

According to the United States Census Bureau, the village has a total area of 0.6 square miles (1.6 km^{2}), of which 0.02 square miles (0.05 km^{2}), or 2.82%, are water.

=== Surrounding areas ===
- North Miami
- North Miami North Miami
- Unincorporated Miami-Dade County Unincorporated Miami-Dade County
- Miami Shores Miami Shores
- Miami Shores

== Demographics ==
Historical population
Census	Pop.	Note	%±
1940	500		—
1950	2,009		301.8%
1960	2,911		44.9%
1970	2,717		−6.7%
1980	3,088		13.7%
1990	3,068		−0.6%
2000	3,269		6.6%
2010	3,055		−6.5%
2020	3,117		2.0%
U.S. Decennial Census

=== 2020 census ===
As of the 2020 census, Biscayne Park had a population of 3,117. The median age was 42.7 years. 21.0% of residents were under the age of 18 and 16.1% of residents were 65 years of age or older. For every 100 females there were 89.4 males, and for every 100 females age 18 and over there were 88.7 males age 18 and over.

100.0% of residents lived in urban areas, while 0.0% lived in rural areas.

There were 1,220 households in Biscayne Park, of which 36.6% had children under the age of 18 living in them. Of all households, 48.4% were married-couple households, 17.4% were households with a male householder and no spouse or partner present, and 27.6% were households with a female householder and no spouse or partner present. About 22.7% of all households were made up of individuals and 10.0% had someone living alone who was 65 years of age or older.

There were 1,312 housing units, of which 7.0% were vacant. The homeowner vacancy rate was 1.4% and the rental vacancy rate was 5.3%.

Biscayne Park racial composition (Hispanics excluded from racial categories) (NH = Non-Hispanic)
Race	Number	Percentage
White (NH)	1,202	38.56%
Black or African American (NH)	334	10.72%
Native American or Alaska Native (NH)	5	0.16%
Asian (NH)	86	2.76%
Pacific Islander or Native Hawaiian (NH)	1	0.03%
Some other race (NH)	19	0.61%
Two or more races/Multiracial (NH)	122	3.91%
Hispanic or Latino	1,348	43.25%
Total	3,117	100.00%

According to the 2020 American Community Survey 5-year estimate, there were 620 families residing in the village.

=== 2010 census ===
Biscayne Park Demographics
2010 Census	Biscayne Park	Miami-Dade County	Florida
Total population	3,055	2,496,435	18,801,310
Population, percent change, 2000 to 2010	–6.5%	+10.8%	+17.6%
Population density	4,843.1/sq mi	1,315.5/sq mi	350.6/sq mi
White or Caucasian (including White Hispanic)	72.4%	73.8%	75.0%
(Non-Hispanic White or Caucasian)	43.4%	15.4%	57.9%
Black or African-American	17.6%	18.9%	16.0%
Hispanic or Latino (of any race)	35.2%	65.0%	22.5%
Asian	3.3%	1.5%	2.4%
Native American or Native Alaskan	0.2%	0.2%	0.4%
Pacific Islander or Native Hawaiian	0.1%	0.0%	0.1%
Two or more races (Multiracial)	3.6%	2.4%	2.5%
Some Other Race	2.8%	3.2%	3.6%

As of the 2010 United States census, there were 3,055 people, 1,166 households, and 755 families residing in the village.

=== 2000 census ===
In 2000, 31.3% had children under the age of 18 living with them, 44.9% were married couples living together, 14.8% had a female householder with no husband present, and 35.2% were non-families. 25.0% of all households were made up of individuals, and 7.2% had someone living alone who was 65 years of age or older. The average household size was 2.55 and the average family size was 3.12. Estimated median household income in 2015: $82,888. Estimated per capita income in 2015: $32,505.

In 2000, the village population was spread out, with 23.8% under the age of 18, 6.3% from 18 to 24, 34.1% from 25 to 44, 24.6% from 45 to 64, and 11.3% who were 65 years of age or older. The median age was 37 years. For every 100 females, there were 93.5 males. For every 100 women aged 18 and over, there were 89.8 men.

In 2000, the median income for a household in the village was $48,313, and the median income for a family was $53,409. Men had a median income of $39,964 versus $33,125 for women. The per capita income for the village was $22,923.

In 2000, speakers of English as a first language was at 59.60%, with Spanish at 29.27%, French Creole at 9.40%, and French at 1.74% of the population.

== Government ==
The village is governed by a mayor, vice mayor and three commissioners. It also has a village manager.
