= Barbara M. Carey-Shuler =

American public servant and community activist

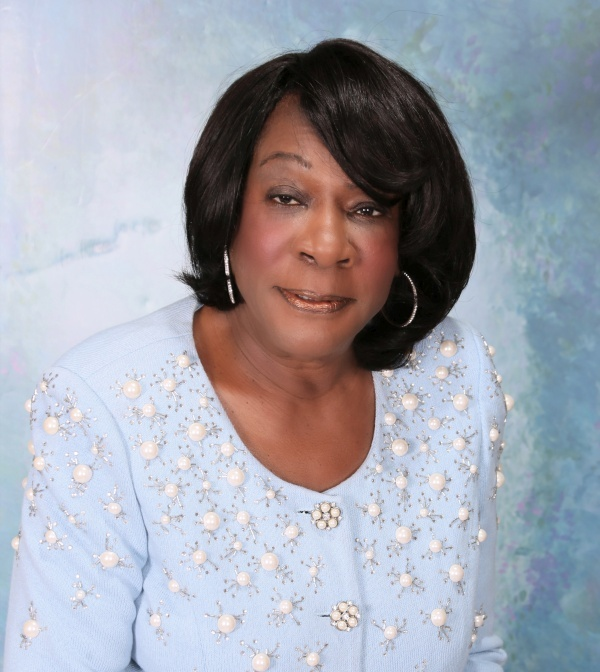
- Carey-Shuler in 2015
- Born: Barbara Jean McCollough; Fernandina Beach, Florida
- Education: B.S. - Florida A&M Univ. 1961; M.A. - Ohio State Univ. 1962; M.Ed. - University of Miami 1969; Ed.D - Univ. of Florida 1978
- Occupations: Educator, Elected Public Official & Business Owner
- Years active: 1966 - present
- Organization: Dade County Public Schools Miami-Dade Board of County Commissioners Shuler's Memorial Chapel
- Title: County Commissioner Commission Chair
- Term: 1979-1990 1996-2005
- Predecessor: Commissioner Neal Adams 1976-1979
- Successor: Commissioner Audrey M. Edmonson 2005-2020

Barbara M. Carey-Shuler is an American public servant, community activist and educator who served as the first African American woman on the Board of County Commissioners for Miami-Dade County, Florida (formerly Metro-Dade County) when she was appointed by then-Governor Robert Bob Graham on December 10, 1979. She was elected to the Commission in 1982, 1986, 1996, 2000, and 2004 while serving as the chairwoman of the Board of County Commissioners from 2002 to 2004, when she became the first African-American to hold the position in the 60 years of Miami-Dade County governance.

== Early life and education ==
Barbara Jean McCollough was born and raised in the small coastal town of Fernandina Beach, Florida by her parents Wendell H. and Janie Lang McCollough. In 1957, she graduated as the valedictorian from Peck High School, a segregated school for African Americans. Barbara McCollough attended Florida A&M University, a historically Black university, where she graduated in 1961 with a Bachelor of Science degree in speech. In 1962, she earned a Master of Arts in speech and communications from Ohio State University.

Furthering her education while working as a public-school teacher and later as an administrator for the Miami-Dade County Public Schools, Barbara McCollough Carey earned a Master of Education in Guidance at the University of Miami in 1969. She also completed a Doctorate in Educational Supervision and Administration from the University of Florida in 1978.

== Appointment ==
As a civic activist, Barbara Carey co-chaired the 1978 Dade County election campaign of Governor-to-be Robert Bob Graham. When sitting County Commissioner Neal Adams was removed from office, Governor Graham, announced on December 10, 1979, that he was appointing Carey as the first black female to sit on the nine-member Metropolitan Dade County Board of County Commissioners. At the time of her appointment Barbara Carey was married to Archibald Carey Sr. with a 12-year-old son Archibald Jr. Archibald Sr. later died in August 1981 after a long period of illness.

== Miami-Dade County Commission ==
Within days of Carey's appointment, Arthur McDuffie, an insurance agent, was killed by Metro-Dade Police Officers. On May 17, 1980, an all-white jury acquitted the officers, and after an initial non-violent protest, riots lasting three days broke out and caused 18 deaths and an estimated $100 million in property damage. The McDuffie Riot was the most destructive race riot at that time in the United States. Carey led the effort at the Metro-Dade County Commission to compensate the McDuffie family, stating "We can never compensate a family adequately for the life of loved ones particularly in these circumstances. It is in the best interest of everyone to settle out of court. We can't open up these wounds in the community again". She additionally sought federal support for the rebuilding of the Liberty City community, while also advocating for police reforms, including a civilian-led police oversight panel and minority hiring

Before Martin Luther King Jr. Day became a federal holiday, Carey spearheaded a resolution designating the January 15th birthday of Dr Martin Luther King Jr. as an official county holiday in Miami-Dade County.

Carey authored and secured passage of legislation requiring every motorist to observe a 15-mph speed limit while driving in school zones. Her leadership also led to black employees of the county's Solid Waste Department who only had been hired as part-time employees, being hired as full-time employees eligible for all benefits. In addition, Carey introduced and led the effort to pass the set-aside law and the affirmative action policy, which was argued all the way to the United States Supreme Court, resulting in creating more jobs and business opportunities for minorities and women than any other economic measure passed by the County Commission. Carey sponsored at the local level the State of Florida's Affordable Housing Surtax program. At the time, it was the first in the nation to establish a funding vehicle to provide home ownership, housing rehabilitation and affordable rental options. By 2017, the program had created over 10,000 single family homeowners and exceeded 15,000 affordable rental units throughout Miami-Dade County, Florida.

In 1990, Carey was defeated by Arthur Teele, Jr., who Carey had introduced to the Miami-Dade community. After reclaiming her Commission seat in the election of 1996, she married James Lamar Shuler in early 1999, the owner of Shuler's Memorial Funeral Home in Palm Beach County, FL. The newly married Carey-Shuler went on to win the elections of 2000 and 2004. She held the position of chairwoman of the Board of County Commissioners from 2002 to 2004, one of the most powerful positions in Miami-Dade County. She was the first elected official to lead the 13-member Board through its inaugural session exercising the greater legislative powers as approved by the voters of Miami-Dade County in September 2002.

Several of Carey-Shuler's national award-winning programs were: Partners for Youth Program, Epilepsy Education for Minorities, Afrocentric Enhancement and Self-Esteem Opportunity Program (AESOP). She led the effort to implement and increase the development of transit-oriented developments along major transit corridors and high traffic community enclaves. Her leadership in the formation and chairing of the Transit Center Connections Committee developed a blueprint for multi-use transit villages along the northern leg of the Metrorail line in her commission district, including: the Martin Luther King Transit Station Complex, the Brownsville Transit Village, the Overtown Transit Village and the Seventh Avenue Transit Village, later renamed in 2016.

Culturally, Carey-Shuler secured funding for the construction and renovation of Virginia Key Beach Park Civil Rights Museum and Cultural Center. A major restoration of The Historic Lyric Theater in Overtown was accomplished by the Black Archives through a continuing resolution of funding, sponsored by Carey-Shuler; becoming one of the first jewels of the Overtown renaissance. The Historic Hampton House Hotel was saved from demolition by a Carey-Shuler-led coalition of preservation activist. She steered the Performing Arts Center project through the County Commission during a difficult period of delayed construction and over-budget spending. Her efforts and leadership contributed to the Adrienne Arsht Center for the Performing Arts becoming a financial success and a world renown facility of the arts.

She was responsible for the concept and creation of Music Fest Miami, a multi-cultural festivity on Labor Day Weekend centered around the global music community of Miami and South Florida. The three-year event featured music, food and culture events in numerous neighborhood mini-festivals around Miami-Dade County. Local high school students were introduced to nationally known musicians during interactive presentations and in-school concerts. The culminating event was an all-day music festival of world music at Miami's Bayfront Park, featuring artists Isaac Hayes, Mandrill, Arturo Sandoval, Jonathan Butler, Inner Circle, Earth, Wind and Fire, Charlie Haden and Patti LaBelle.

After serving more than twenty years, on December 6, 2005, Carey-Shuler resigned from the Miami-Dade County Commission to care for ailing family members. Less than seven weeks later, her mother died on January 8, 2006; her husband, James Lamar Shuler, died on October 1, 2006; and her mentor M. Athalie Range died on November 14 of the same year.

== Philanthropist, volunteer and civic activist ==
In 2017, Carey-Shuler was instrumental in advocating for the City of Delray Beach to rename a street after her late husband, James Lamar Shuler as an ode to his work in redeveloping the blighted areas of Delray Beach, FL.

As Carey-Shuler has managed and maintained her husband's legacy at the Shuler's Memorial Chapel, she has continued her civic and social activism within the African American community of south Palm Beach County.

Carey-Shuler adopted Inlet Grove Community High School and volunteers as President of the foundation and Vice President of the governing board. Inlet Grove High School is a training ground that educates students to be career or college ready upon graduation.

Carey-Shuler serves as the Secretary on the Board of Trustees of Technology, Enterprise and Development Center, which provides business experience in its programming to clients and customers.

She also serves as a member of the board of directors for Pathways to Prosperity, a non-profit organization based in Boynton Beach, Florida, which is dedicated to strengthening the communityby providing educational and social service resources.

Carey-Shuler's continued activism for history and community preservation is fulfilled by her service as a board member of the Spady Museum in Delray Beach, Florida.

In 2013, Carey-Shuler was recognized for her business success and personal contributions to the Greater West Palm Beach community by Delta Sigma Theta sorority of West Palm Beach and the Delta Heritage Foundation.

On November 12, 2022, the Miami-Dade County Commission honored Carey-Shuler with a street unveiling ceremony at the Joseph Caleb Center, 5400 NW 22nd Avenue, Miami, FL, co-designating a portion of Northwest 22nd Avenue between State Road 112 and Northwest 79th Street as "Dr. Barbara Carey-Shuler Boulevard" in recognition of her trailblazing contributions as an educator and public servant in Miami-Dade County.

In 2023, Carey-Shuler's generous gift to Palm Beach State College enabled the establishment of the Dr. Barbara Carey-Shuler Equity Institute, an initiative dedicated to improving retention and graduation rates among minority students while also serving as a leading center for research, education, and policy development in the areas of racial and social equity.

In recognition of Carey-Shuler's extensive philanthropic and civic contributions throughout her career, she has received numerous prestigious awards. Some of the recent accolades include: the KOP Mentoring Network Award, the TED Center Shining Stars Award, the Spady Museum Service Award, and Palm Beach State College recognition for the Sister to Sister Project and NEXTGEN Summer Bridge Program. In addition, Carey Shuler was named as a "2023 Presidential Award" honoree and thus received the President Joseph R. Biden Lifetime Achievement Award, along with the Presidential Volunteer Service Award medals. President Biden's letter cited her "years of dedicated service to this great nation [that] have made a difference in the lives of many, and [her] life's work has touched the hearts of millions [as she continues] to be an influential force around the world."

In 2025, she was named an inaugural inductee of the Miami-Dade Arts Hall of Fame at the Serving the Arts Awards in Coral Gables, in recognition of her contributions to cultural preservation and community development, including securing funding for the Virginia Key Beach Park Civil Rights Museum and the restoration of The Historic Lyric Theater in Overtown.
