= John Culmer =

Father John Culmer
- Born: May 22, 1891; Eleuthera, Bahamas
- Died: June 18, 1963 (aged 72); Miami, Florida USA
- Education: Oskaloosa College
- Church: Saint Agnes Church

Father John Edwin Culmer (May 22, 1891 – June 18, 1963) was a Bahamian-born American minister and leader during the civil rights movement, most notable for his work in Miami.

== Early life ==
Culmer was born on May 22, 1891. He attended Oskaloosa College, where he received a B.A. in music. He received a bachelor of divinity degree from Bishop Payne Divinity School. He has also received honorary doctorates from Bethune-Cookman College and the Virginia Theological Seminary.

== Career ==
After leading a ministry in Tampa, in 1929, Culmer was transferred to the Saint Agnes Church in Miami. At the church, Father Culmer helped the poorly established church become one of the most acclaimed congregations in the American South.

During his tenure as minister, he served on the Dade County Senior Citizens Board, and headed Miami's Peaceful Integration committee. Culmer also was chairman of the Fact-Finding Committee of the Greater Miami Negro Civic League, where he brought national attention to the deplorable housing and sanitation conditions of African Americans in Miami; this led to the building of the Liberty Square housing project, which opened in 1937.

== Death and legacy ==
Culmer died on June 18, 1963. The Culmer Metrorail station is named in his honor.
