= UHealth–Jackson station =

Miami-Dade Transit metro station

●● UHealth–Jackson
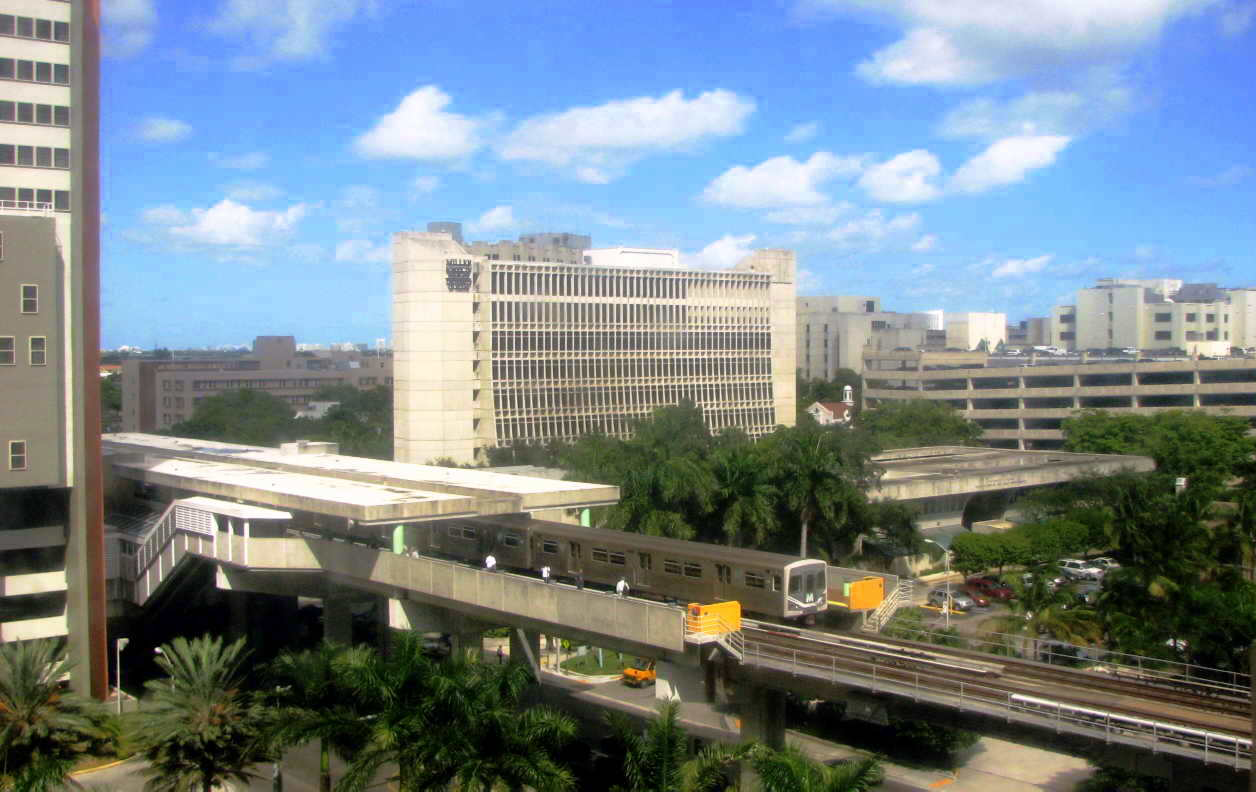
- View from the University of Miami/Jackson Memorial Hospital medical complex and Metrorail train entering the station

General information
- Location: 1501 NW 12th Avenue; Miami, Florida, U.S.
- Coordinates: 25°47′23″N 80°12′54″W
- Owner: Miami-Dade County
- Platforms: 2 side platforms
- Tracks: 2
- Connections: Metrobus: 12, 95, 401

Construction
- Accessible: Yes

Other information
- Station code: CVC

History
- Opened: December 17, 1984

Passengers
- 2011: 1.7 million 0%

Services
Preceding station	Miami-Dade Transit	Following station
Culmer toward Dadeland South	Green Line	Santa Clara toward Palmetto
Culmer toward Dadeland South	Orange Line	Santa Clara toward Miami Int'l Airport
Location

UHealth–Jackson station (stylized as UHealth | Jackson) is a station on the Metrorail rapid transit system in the Health District of Miami, Florida. The station is located at the intersection of Northwest 12th Avenue (State Road 933) and 15th Street. UHealth–Jackson provides a convenient connection for University of Miami medical students by connecting the hospital area to the main campus at University Station.

The station contains a branch of the Miami-Dade Public Library System.

The station opened for service on December 17, 1984, as Civic Center. It was changed to its current name on July 12, 2024.

== Station layout ==
The station has two tracks served by side platforms. Entrances to the station are on either side of Northwest 12th Avenue, with fare control in a central mezzanine directly below the platform.

== Places of interest ==
- Jackson Memorial Hospital
- University of Miami Miller School of Medicine
- Bascom Palmer Eye Institute
- Veterans Hospital
- LoanDepot Park (1 mile walk south)
- Miami-Dade County Jail
- Miami-Dade Justice Building/Courts
- Florida State Building
- Cedars Medical Center
- Miami-Dade County Health Department
- University of Miami Hospitals and Clinics (i.e. UHealth Tower)
- River Landing Shops and Residences
