= Culmer station =

Miami-Dade Transit metro station

●● Culmer
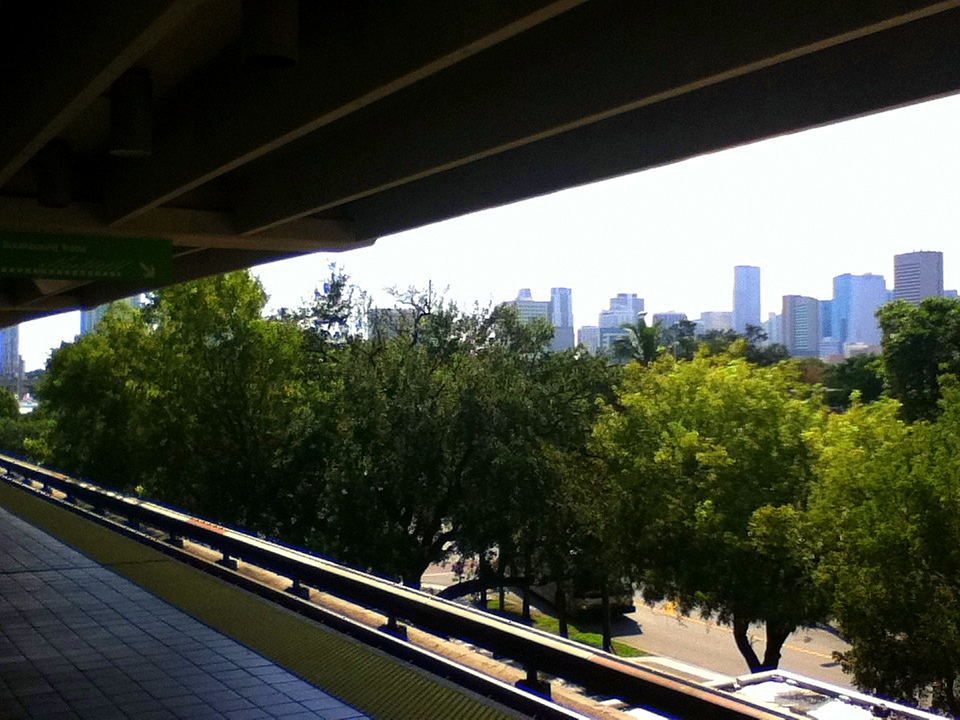
- Downtown Miami, as seen from the station's southbound platform

General information
- Location: 701 NW 11th Street; Miami, Florida
- Coordinates: 25°47′4″N 80°12′28″W
- Owner: Miami-Dade County
- Platforms: 1 island platform
- Tracks: 2
- Connections: Metrobus: 77

Construction
- Accessible: Yes

Other information
- Station code: CUL

History
- Opened: December 17, 1984

Passengers
- 2011: 351,000 ▲11%

Services
Preceding station	Miami-Dade Transit	Following station
Historic Overtown/Lyric Theatre toward Dadeland South	Green Line	UHealth–Jackson toward Palmetto
Historic Overtown/Lyric Theatre toward Dadeland South	Orange Line	UHealth–Jackson toward Miami Int'l Airport
Location

Culmer station is a station on the Metrorail rapid transit system just northeast of the Spring Garden neighborhood of Miami, Florida, near the Midtown Interchange. This station is located at the intersection of Northwest 11th Street and Seventh Avenue (US 441), opening to service December 17, 1984. The station is named after Father John Culmer, a local civil rights leader who worked to improve the living conditions of black Miamians.

== Station layout ==
The station has two tracks served by an island platform, with a parking lot south of the platform and bus bays north of it.

== Places of interest ==
- Spring Garden
- LoanDepot Park
- Historic Booker T. Washington Senior High School
- Northwest Seventh Avenue (US 441/State Road 7)
