= Historic Overtown/Lyric Theatre station =

Miami-Dade Transit metro station

●● Historic Overtown/Lyric Theatre
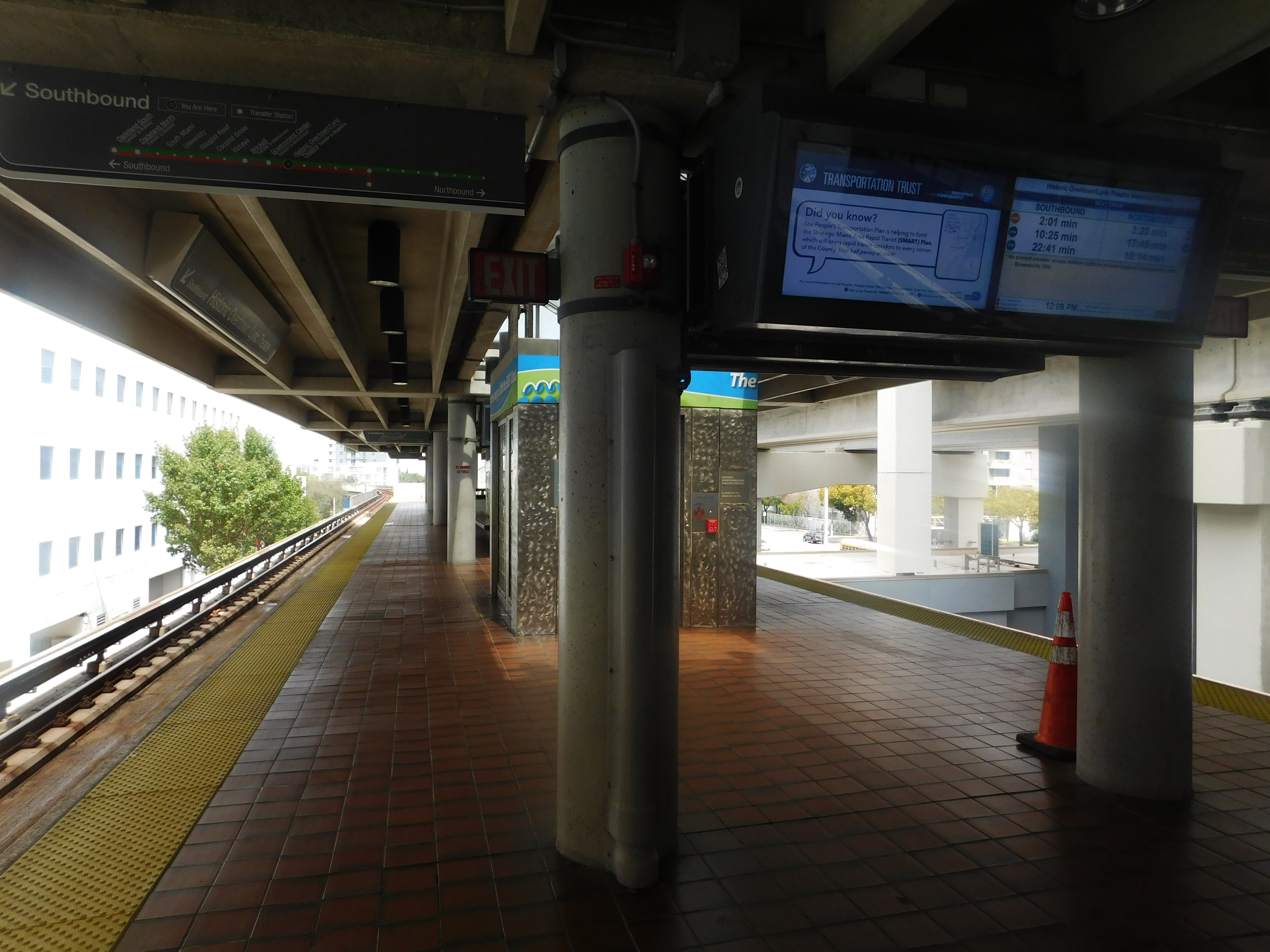
- Station platform

General information
- Location: 100 NW Sixth Street, Miami, Florida
- Coordinates: 25°46′51″N 80°11′46″W
- Owner: Miami-Dade County
- Platforms: 1 island platform
- Tracks: 2
- Connections: Brightline (at MiamiCentral); Tri-Rail (at MiamiCentral); Metrobus: 2, 7, 21, 95, 95A, 95B, 401, 836, 837; Broward County Transit: 109, 110

Construction
- Parking: No
- Accessible: Yes

Other information
- Station code: OVT

History
- Opened: May 20, 1984
- Former names: Overtown (1984–1988); Overtown/Arena (1988–2007)

Passengers
- 2011: 417,000 ▲12%

Services
Preceding station	Miami-Dade Transit	Following station
Government Center toward Dadeland South	Green Line	Culmer toward Palmetto
Government Center toward Dadeland South	Orange Line	Culmer toward Miami Int'l Airport
Location

Historic Overtown / Lyric Theatre station is a station on the Metrorail rapid transit system in northwest Downtown, Miami, Florida. The station is located at the intersection of Northwest Sixth Street and First Avenue, just south of the neighborhood of Overtown and east of the historic Lyric Theatre. It opened on May 20, 1984. Originally called Overtown, the Arena was added to the name in 1988 when the Miami Arena opened. It took on its current name in 2007, one year before the Miami Arena was demolished. This station is within walking distance to MiamiCentral, which serves Tri-Rail and Brightline.

== Station layout ==
The station has two tracks served by an island platform.

== Places of interest ==
- Kaseya Center
- Lyric Theatre
- Miami Worldcenter
- Ninth Street Pedestrian Mall
- Park West District
- Northern Downtown Miami
