= LoanDepot Park =

Baseball stadium in Miami, Florida

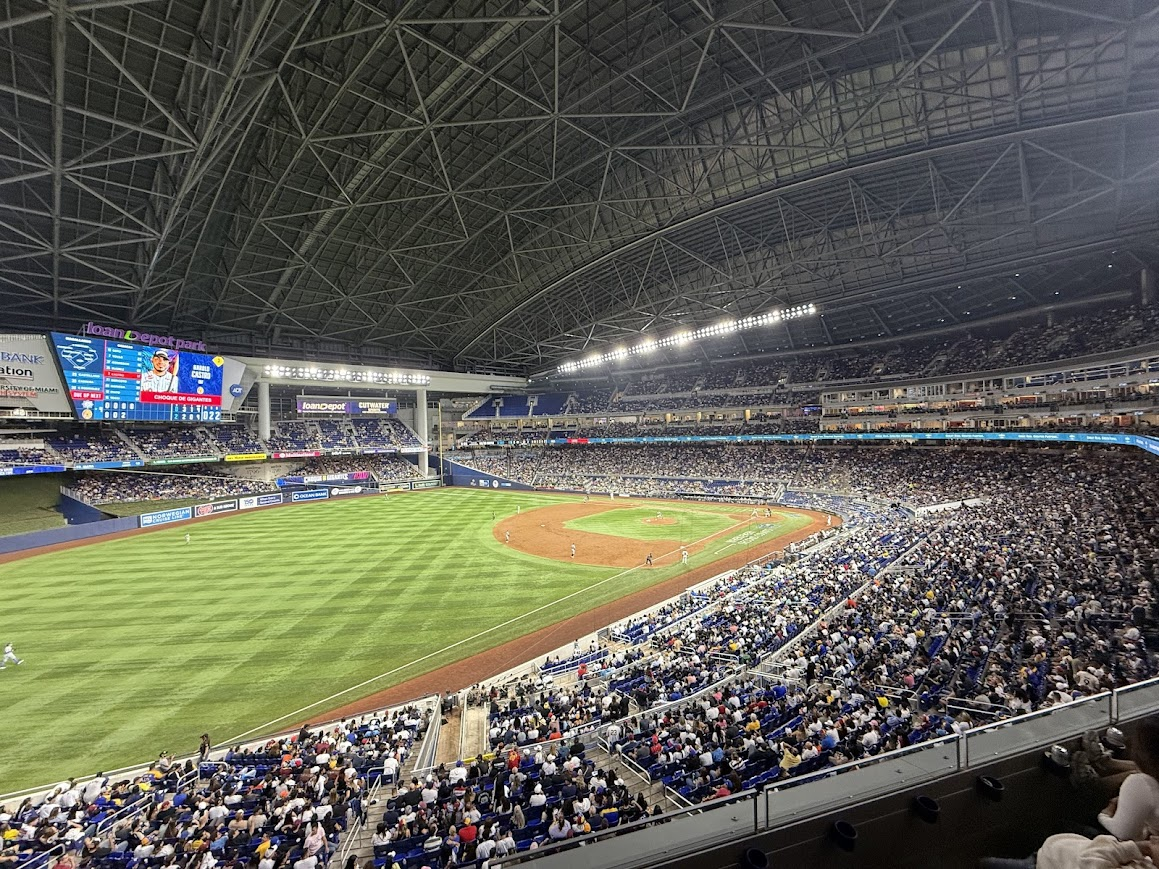
- LoanDepot Park in closed roof configuration in November 2024

- Location in Miami Location in Florida Location in the United States
- Former names: Marlins Park (2012–2020)
- Address: 501 Marlins Way
- Location: Miami, Florida, U.S.
- Coordinates: 25°46′41″N 80°13′11″W
- Owner: Miami-Dade County
- Operator: Miami Marlins LP
- Capacity: 36,742; 37,442 (with standing room); 34,000 (football)
- Surface: Grass (2012–2019); Shaw Sports B1K (2020–present)
- Record attendance: 37,446 (March 11, 2017 World Baseball Classic. USA vs Dom. Rep.)
- Field size: Left field line – 344 ft (105 m); Left-center power alley – 386 ft (118 m); Center field – 400 ft (120 m); Right-center power alley – 387 ft (118 m); Right field line – 335 ft (102 m); Backstop: – 47 ft (14.3 m)
- Acreage: 928,000 sq ft (86,200 m^{2})
- Public transit: Free City of Miami Trolley from UHealth–Jackson station Marlins Shuttle from Culmer
- Parking: Four main parking garages and six surface lots

Construction
- Groundbreaking: July 1, 2009 (Start of construction preparations); July 18, 2009 (Ceremonial groundbreaking)
- Opened: March 5, 2012 (High school baseball game); March 6, 2012 (exhibition game); April 1, 2012 (spring training game); April 4, 2012 (regular season)
- Cost: US$634 million ($889 million in 2025 dollars)
- Architect: Populous
- Project manager: International Facilities Group
- Structural engineers: Bliss & Nyitray, Inc (bowl and track); Walter P Moore (roof)
- Services engineers: M-E Engineers, Inc.
- General contractor: Hunt/Moss Joint Venture
- Main contractors: MARS Contractors Inc. John J. Kirlin, LLC. Structal – Heavy Steel Construction, A division of Canam Group (roof)

Tenants
- Miami Marlins (MLB) (2012–present); Miami Beach Bowl (NCAA) (2014–2016)

Website
- mlb.com/marlins/ballpark

LoanDepot Park (officially stylized as loanDepot park, and named Marlins Park until 2021) is a stadium with a retractable roof located in Miami, Florida, United States. It is the ballpark of Major League Baseball's Miami Marlins. It is located on 17 acres (6.9 ha) on the site of the former Miami Orange Bowl in Little Havana about 2 miles (3 km) west of Downtown Miami. Construction was completed in March 2012 for that year's season.

LoanDepot Park was LEED certified as the greenest MLB park in 2012. The building is the sixth MLB stadium to have a retractable roof. With a seating capacity of 37,442, it is the third-smallest stadium in Major League Baseball by official capacity, and the smallest by actual capacity. The facility hosted a second-round pool of the 2013 World Baseball Classic, a first-round pool of the 2017 World Baseball Classic, the 2017 Major League Baseball All-Star Game, and the championship game of the 2023 World Baseball Classic, as well as the host of the semifinal and championship games of the 2026 World Baseball Classic. The park also hosts soccer matches, fundraising galas, and other events during the winter. It also hosted the Miami Beach Bowl from 2014 through 2016.

The stadium is designed in a neomodern form of baseball architecture.

== History ==
=== Planning ===
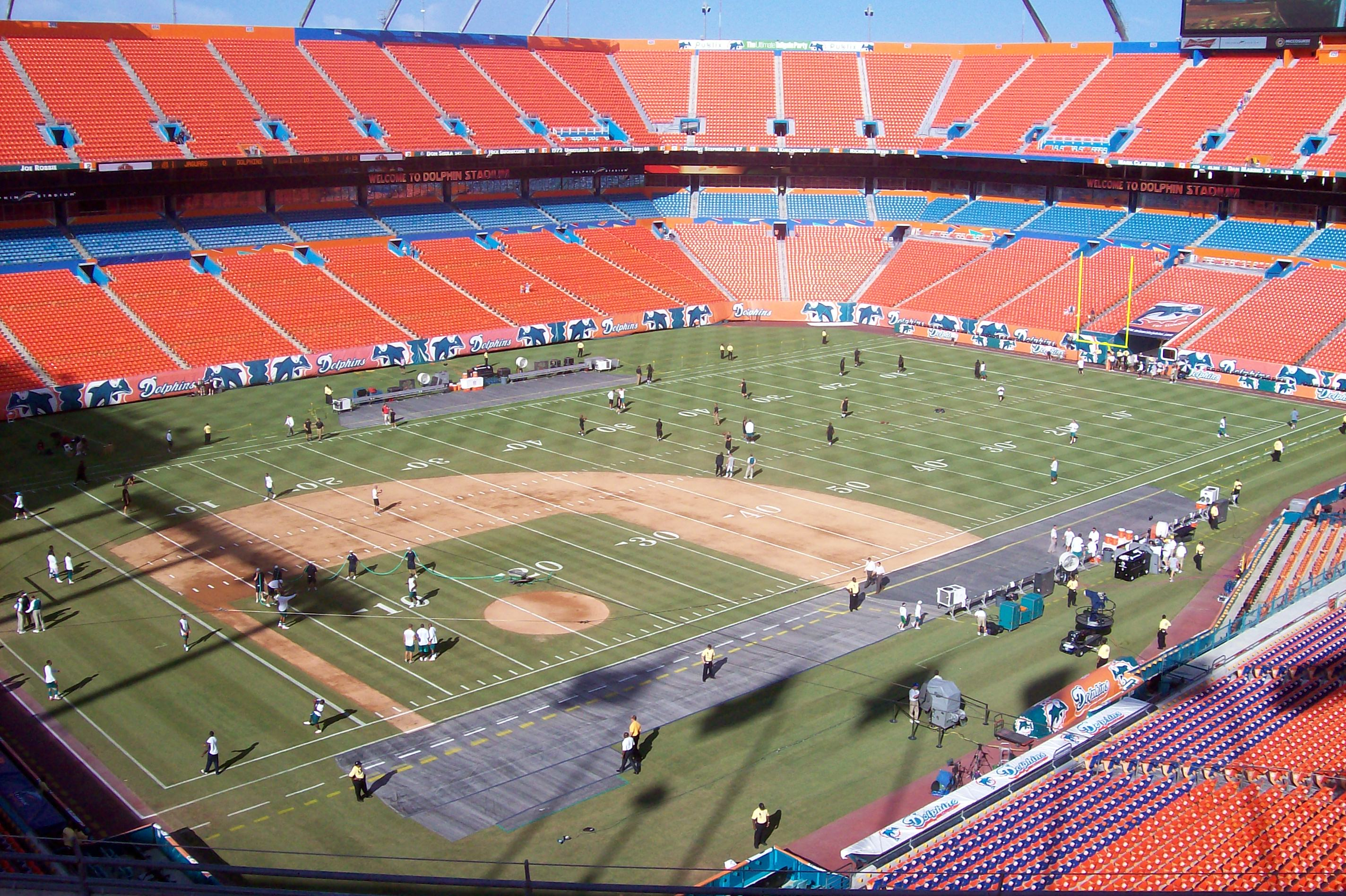
The Miami Marlins' former home at what was then Dolphin Stadium was primarily a football stadium, shown prepping for a Miami Dolphins game with gridlines over the diamond in August 2007

Prior to the construction of LoanDepot Park, the Marlins played home games at what was originally known as Joe Robbie Stadium in Miami Gardens, which was known by a number of different names during the Marlins' tenure there. Joe Robbie Stadium was built in 1987 as home to the Miami Dolphins of the National Football League (NFL), and was designed as a multi-purpose stadium built primarily for football, but its design also accommodated baseball and soccer. The Dolphins founder, Joe Robbie, believed it was a foregone conclusion that MLB would come to South Florida and so he wanted the stadium designed to make any necessary renovations for baseball as seamless as possible. The Marlins arrived in 1993 and, during their time at the stadium, drew more than 3 million people in their inaugural season and also won two World Series titles, in 1997 and 2003. The stadium continues to be home to the Dolphins, and since 2008, the Miami Hurricanes from the University of Miami.

After the Marlins began play, multiple issues were soon raised regarding the unsuitability of Joe Robbie Stadium for professional baseball. Among those cited were the poor seat and sight-line configuration for baseball viewing, references to Miami's NFL team such as the logos and color scheme remaining visible in the stadium despite being in baseball configuration, and poor fan environment because of the distance of the action in relation to the seats. The climate in Miami during baseball season was not conducive for the sport and the audience, as games were often either played in 95 °F (35 °C) heat or would be rained out because of the tropical climate in South Florida. Those factors were suspected by the Florida Marlins for having poor fan attendance, as well as players' performance at home games. By 2004, the Florida Marlins were the only team in baseball playing in an NFL-configured sporting stadium.

After the original owner, Wayne Huizenga, claimed that he had lost more than $30 million on the team, he sold the Marlins in early 1999 to John W. Henry. Thereafter, the Marlins began a concerted effort to get their own baseball-only venue. Henry's vision included a retractable roof, which was by then believed to be essential because of South Florida's climate and baseball's summertime schedule. Several ideas were explored on where a new ballpark should be built. The team's desire to leave its original home made for an awkward business relationship over leasing issues with Huizenga, who continued to own the Pro Player Stadium. By January 2002, Henry's stadium proposals were effectively scrapped when MLB Commissioner Bud Selig engineered a three-franchise ownership swap in which Henry left to own the Boston Red Sox, and the Montreal Expos owner, Jeffrey Loria, took over the Marlins.

Loria and the team's president, David Samson, continued the search for a new baseball-only retractable-roof ballpark. The Marlins' second World Series championship in 2003 created some local exuberance for a new ballpark. In January 2004, the City of Miami proposed building a baseball-only stadium for the Marlins at the site of the Miami Orange Bowl, which would adjoin the existing football stadium along its northern flank.

In December 2004, Miami's NFL team notified the Marlins of its intention to terminate the lease at Joe Robbie Stadium by 2010, which would potentially leave the Marlins without a stadium to host its home games. In the ensuing years between 2004 and 2009, the Marlins negotiated with local and state officials regarding funding the construction of a baseball-specific stadium before the termination of its lease at Joe Robbie Stadium. In 2005, Marlins owner Jeffrey Loria and president David Samson failed to come to an agreement with local and state officials regarding the funding of a baseball-specific stadium. Subsequently, the Marlins explored relocation options in the ensuing years from Las Vegas, Portland, and San Antonio. The specter of relocation pushed Charlie Crist, who was the Governor of Florida, and other local mayors to release statements in favor of public funding for the new stadium.

After the Marlins explored other options, including the former site of the Miami Arena, in August 2007, the Miami Hurricanes announced they were leaving the Orange Bowl, which made the newly-vacant site the most attractive option for local governments.

=== Public funding and groundbreaking ===
In February 2008, the Miami City Commission (city council) and the Miami-Dade County Commission (county board) came to an initial agreement to fund the new stadium. The Orange Bowl was subsequently demolished in March 2008 to make way for the new ballpark. A delay in the public funding of the ballpark was caused by a lawsuit filed in the Miami-Dade circuit court by a local car dealer upon which the circuit court judge ruled in favor of the Marlins in November 2008. In March 2009, both the city and the county commission finalized approval for the sale of bonds for funding of the stadium, along with the Florida Marlins to be renamed the Miami Marlins upon the opening of the new stadium. Construction began with a groundbreaking ceremony in July 2009. The total cost of construction for the ballpark was estimated to be $634 million, with 80% of that funded by the city and the county. The structure of the bonds financed over 40 years caused it to be estimated that the principal and the interest paid by the city and the county would accrue to $2.4 billion over the lifetime of the bonds. Between 2009 and 2010, a series of leaked documents from Major League Baseball showed a disparity between the Marlins' intake in MLB revenue sharing and the operating costs of the franchise, suggesting a willful misrepresentation of the team's profit margins under the Loria ownership, as well as Loria and Samson's mismanagement of the Marlins to leverage the local government to provide a lion's share of the funding for the stadium.

During the 2011–12 offseason, Mayor of Miami Regalado publicized details of the contract and expressed concern regarding certain clauses dedicated to the parking facilities and the maintenance of the stadium. Marlins Park began operations on April 4, 2012, for Opening Day of the 2012 season.

=== New ownership and further changes ===
In 2017, the Loria ownership announced its intention to sell the Miami Marlins. A group of investors led by Derek Jeter and Bruce Sherman took over the Marlins organization in August 2017. Changes to the stadium, including a new color scheme, moving the Home Run sculpture, and obtaining naming rights to the stadium, were achieved during the Jeter regime.

On March 31, 2021, the Marlins announced that they had sold naming rights to Marlins Park to LoanDepot, which renamed the facility LoanDepot Park; terms of the agreement were not disclosed. The naming rights to the stadium reportedly brings $10 million per annum to the Marlins.

== Design ==
=== Contemporary architecture ===
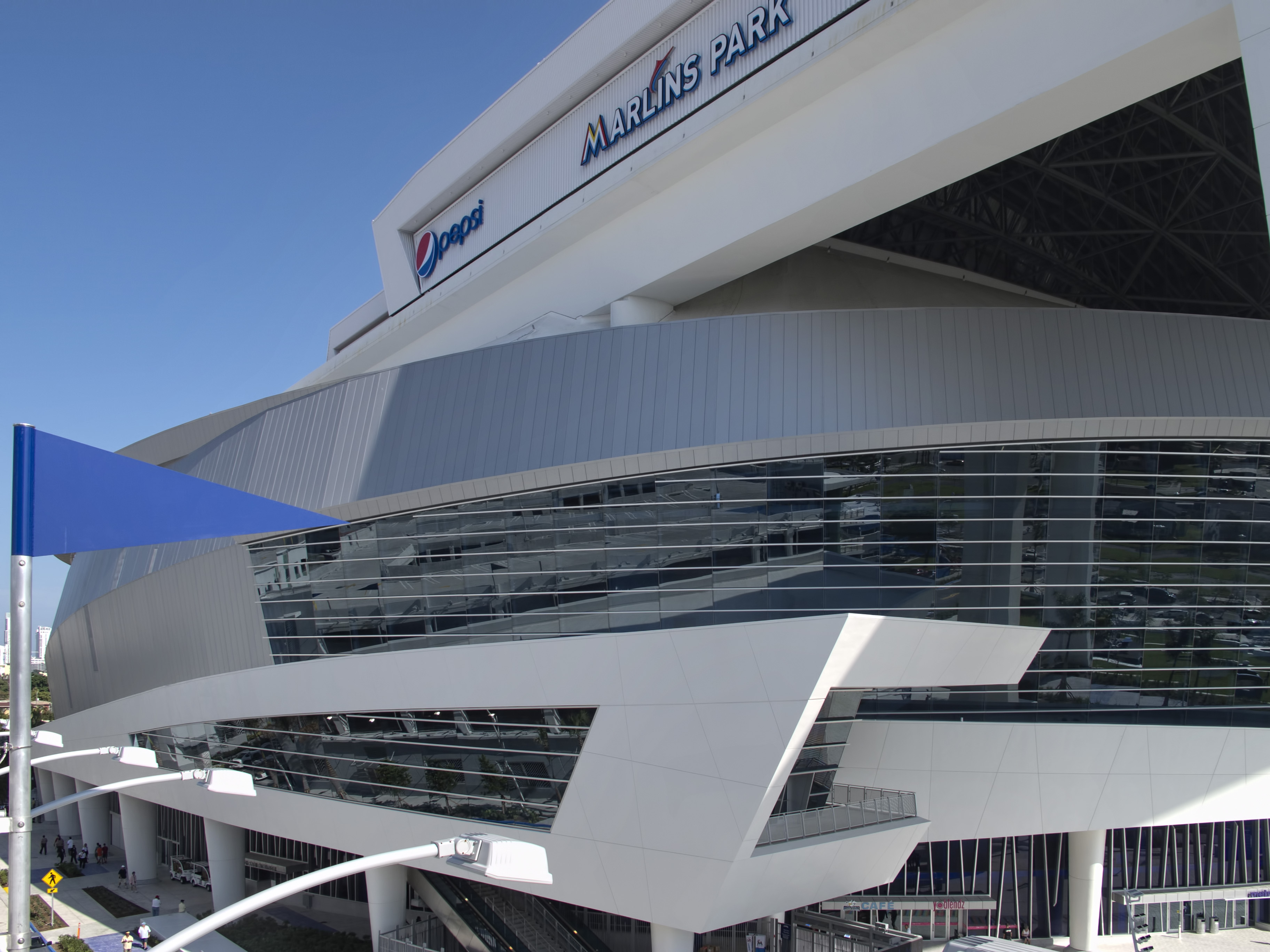
LoanDepot Park seen from north

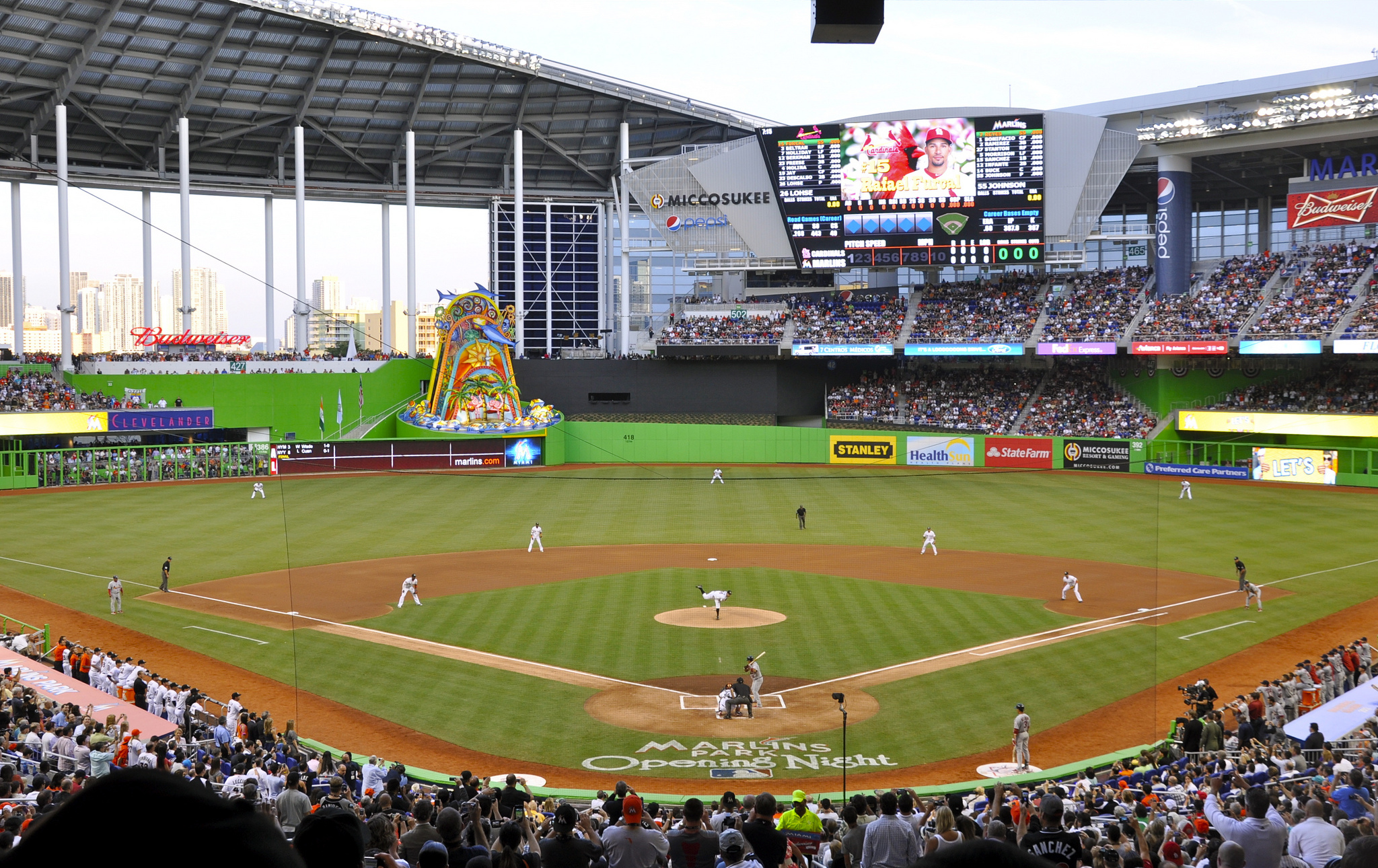
The first pitch at Marlins Park in open roof configuration on April 4, 2012, as the Marlins face the St. Louis Cardinals

LoanDepot Park has the distinction of being the first MLB park designed in what stadium planners are calling the "contemporary" architectural style. The architecture is intended to make a statement about the present-day culture of the city in which the stadium stands. It rejects the nostalgic idiom of the 20 consecutive new (plus three renovated) retro ballparks that opened in the two decades after Camden Yards was built. Owner Jeffrey Loria, who spearheaded the design, wanted his building to be "different and experimental".

In early 2008, Loria was in London at the same time as some architects from Populous who were there on another project. The group met in a hotel lobby to begin discussing design ideas. Loria described the meeting:

When it all started, the architects came to me and asked what I had envisioned. Was I looking to have a retro stadium? Did we have that in mind? I said, "No retro, no art-deco, no looking back. Miami is a spectacular city, looking ahead. We need to be looking forward. I'd like to see us build a great, 'contemporary' building."

We had to think about some kind of design for it and what it might look like ... I really did not want it to be just another ballpark. I wasn't interested in a 1970s or '80s doughnut ... I wanted it to be a statement of what Miami is all about—a contemporary city. Miami is an important American city and architecture makes your city great. The idea was to create something very contemporary.

Loria then sketched his idea of a round building on a napkin and told the architects to bring him back some real drawings. Exec architect Earl Santee, who was present at the meeting, said, "Mr. Loria told us to make a piece of art."

The architects returned to their Kansas City offices and began brainstorming in April 2008. Loria allowed the architects to "do our thing and explore something unique." As a result, classic elements such as redbrick, limestone, and muted forest-green seats or fences, would not be found anywhere in Marlins Park. Any visible steel trusses would be functionally required to be that way, unlike retro-style trusses which tend to be exposed and bare for aesthetics. Sherlock argued that the structure would convey that a ballpark does not need "bricks and steel" to remind people of its location, and could instead be identified "in a fresh way." The stadium would also not be symmetrical like the "cookie-cutter" stadiums of the pre-Camden, modern era.

Populous began conducting feasibility studies for their task. The top objective was creating a ballpark that is "quintessentially Miami," which meant, according to a list of adjectives that the architects drew up, "palms, destination, diverse, recreation, and beach." They created a presentation for the Marlins tailored to Loria's background in the art business with concepts, such as making the site a "gallery space", while the ballpark represented its "gallery walls". Four different initial designs were presented, all of which were stark departures from previous ballpark architecture. Both the Marlins' and Populous' favorite choice was a design of an angular white-curves-and-glass facade, a metaphor for the "water merging with land" landscape of the Miami area, which was close to what eventually became the final design.

=== Local architecture ===
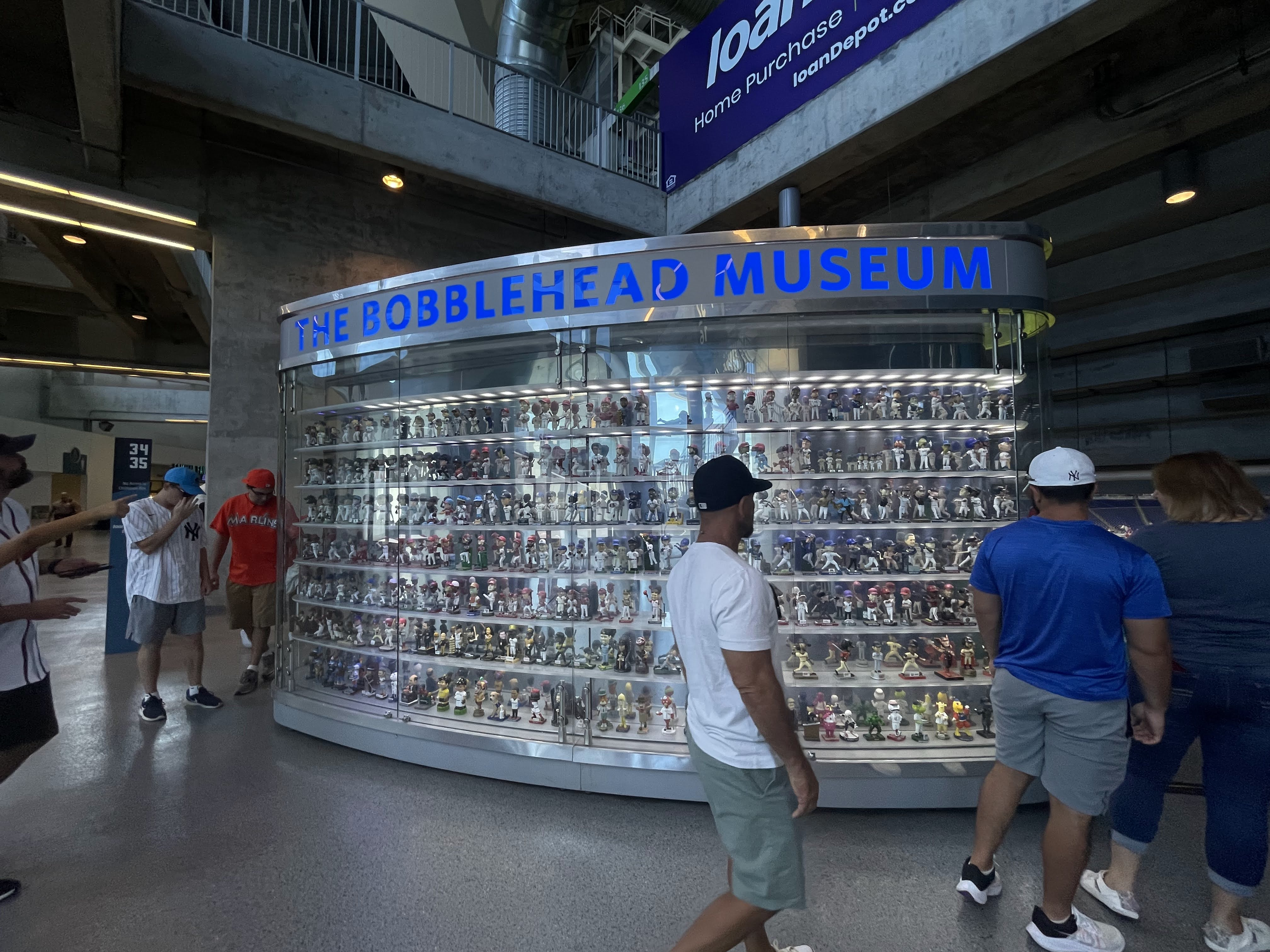
Bobblehead Museum located inside the stadium

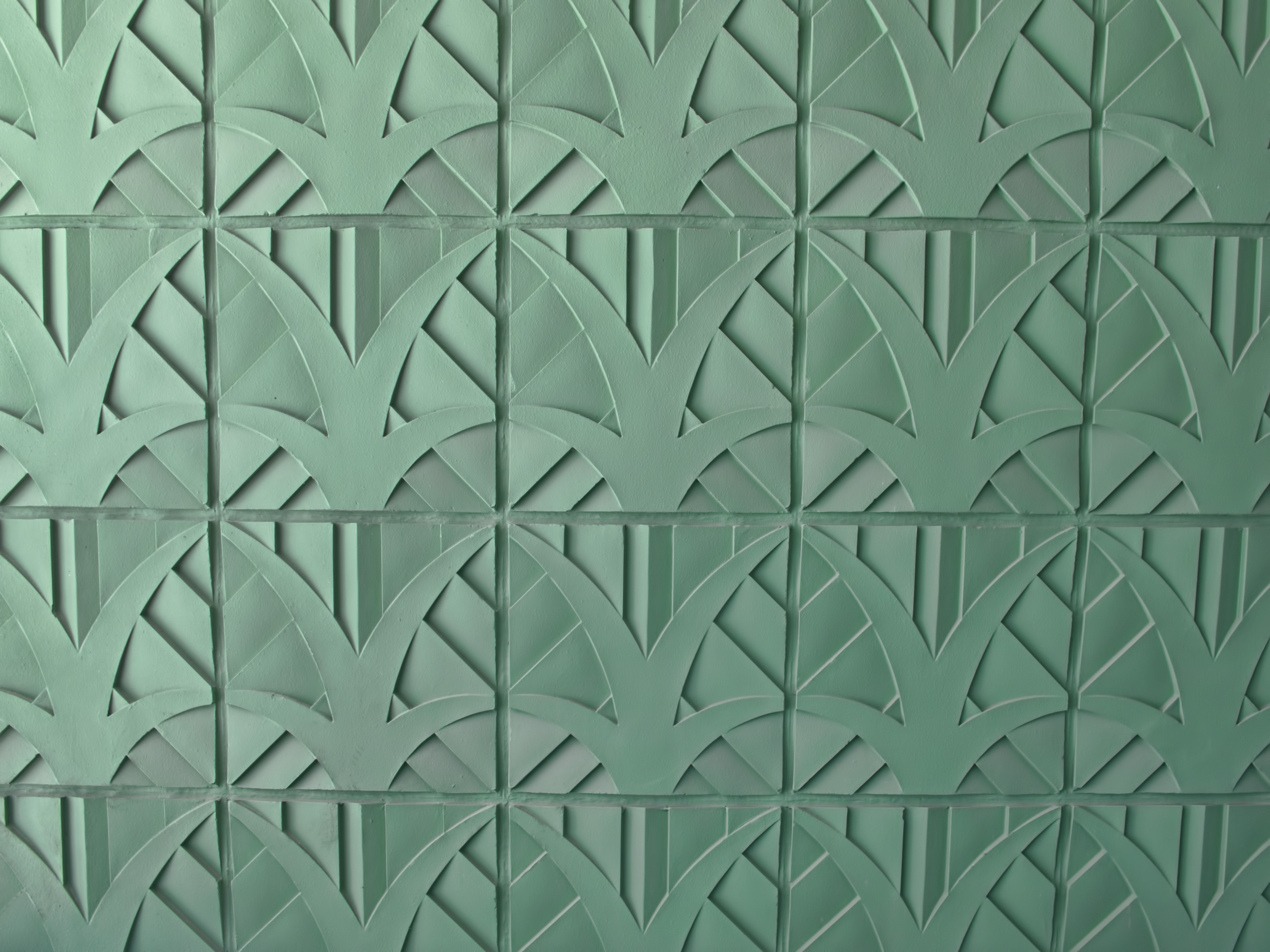
Pastel, Miami-Deco-influenced wall tiles in 4 main parking garages connect the facility to its small-scaled, Little Havana environs

The exterior is a sculptural monument consisting of gleaming white stucco, steel, aluminum, and glass. The inclining elliptical form avoids creating many rigid, right angles. Angled, cantilevered pedestrian ramps also form elegant geometric shapes. Even the parking-garage walls are tiled in Miami-Deco pastels, which connect with Little Havana.

As visitors walk in from the outside, they step right on metaphors for Miami's topography, including concrete pavers that in general are either green or blue ("grass" or "sea"). They walk past landscaping that evokes the "beach"—there's even sand—in places. There's cobalt-blue glass at eye level ("ocean"), the stucco and concrete ("land" or "buildings"), and the paler blue-gray glass at the upper levels ("sky"). The seats are also cobalt-blue, facing the naturally green, Bermuda grass field.

When Marlins fans first realized that the original colors of the team would not appear on the seats in the new stadium—and ultimately not on the new uniforms either—some angrily started a petition known as "Project Teal." But Samson said it was necessary to ignore fans' complaints: "I think any time you do something new and different, the knee-jerk reaction from bloggers or people who post comments is negative. But we have blinders on. This ballpark would have never been built if we had listened to the negativity."

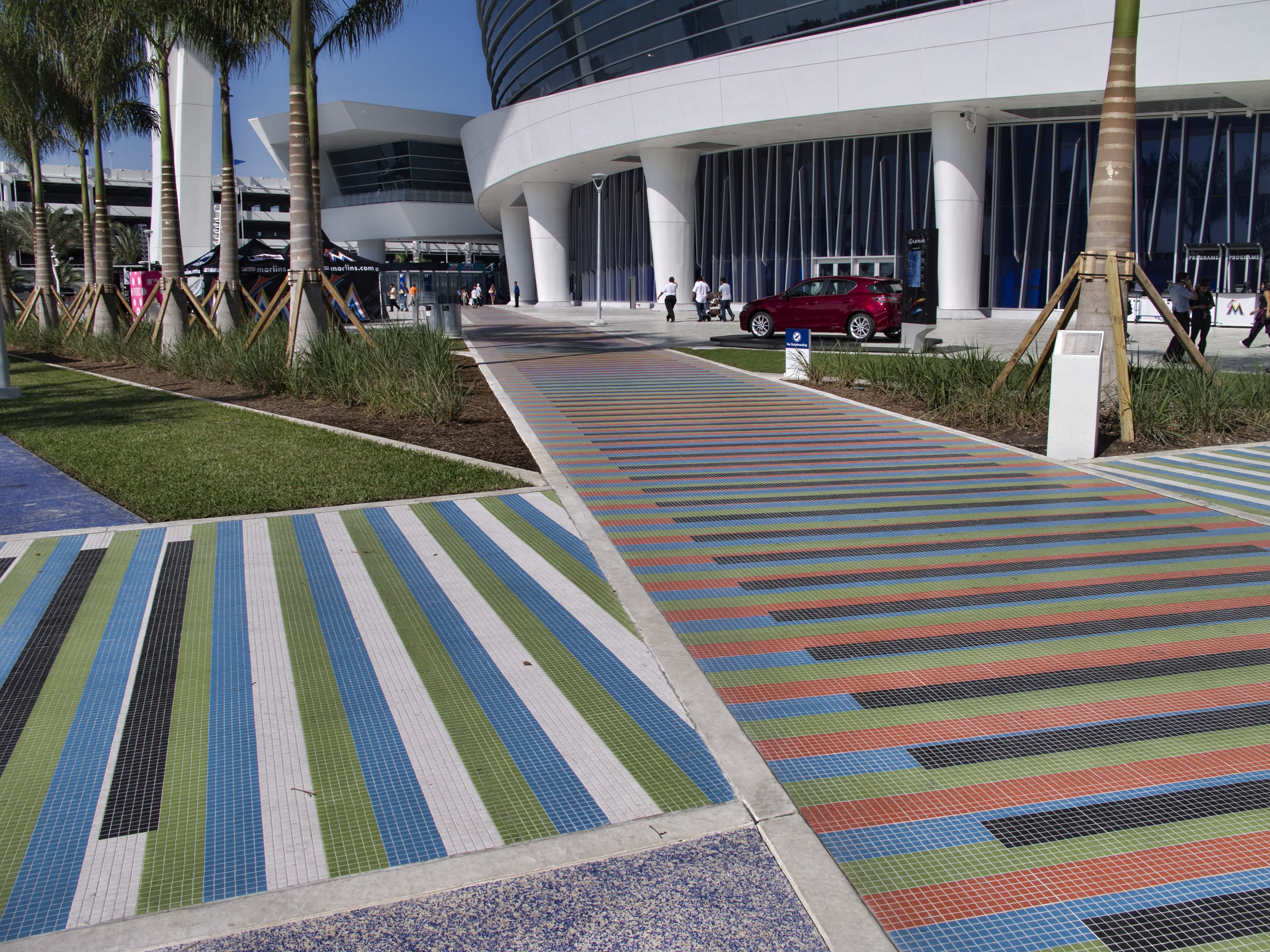
The colorful ballpark has artwork such as tiled walkways on the front plaza by kinetic-op artist Carlos Cruz-Diez

Loria, a notable art dealer, took the four bright primary colors off the palette of the late Catalan surrealist, Joan Miró, to label different zones around the park—green (outfield), red (third-base line), yellow (first-base line) and blue (behind home plate). Wide open plazas at the east and colorful west ends of the building, as well as a 360° concourse inside called the Promenade encourages fans to walk around—and to intermingle at stops such as the bars or the bobblehead museum. Colors are found throughout the interior, including fluorescent lime-green fences, and in modernist and contemporary works of art—including the much-debated animatronic home-run sculpture—that relate to baseball and Miami. "My idea was to have people use their eyes and encourage them to use their eyes," said Loria. "We wanted a ballpark filled with great baseball, great entertainment, and occasionally, some images to be seen and enjoyed. It's not about an art gallery. But it's about images relating to the game. There are a few of them in the park." A nightclub featuring loud music and a swimming pool just beyond the left field fence brings a touch of South Beach into the park. Taste of Miami food court includes such local cuisine as Cuban sandwiches, pork sandwiches, and stone crabs. An aquarium was built inside the walls of the home plate backstop, containing live, tropical fish.

LoanDepot Park pays tribute to the two football stadiums closely associated with the team's stadium history. It transfers over "The Bermuda Triangle" quirk of what was then Sun Life Stadium's outfield fence as a nod to their team's early years. However, instead of straight lines, the new "triangle" is a wave-like shape that smoothly curves upwardly around the base of the large home-run sculpture, making the nook appear necessary to the design of the asymmetrical fence. The height of the tall wall varies from 10 to 16 feet (3.0 to 4.9 m). There are also commemorations to the beloved old Orange Bowl both inside and outside of the park.

A critical design point addresses the tropical climate of South Florida. Fans are provided with the comfort they longed for at Sun Life Stadium with a 5.27-acre (2.13 ha) retractable roof, retractable-glass wall panels that offer a panoramic view of Downtown Miami, and a huge air-conditioning system.

"If our ballpark would speak, its first words would be, '¡Hola, Miami!,'" Loria said during a new-era ceremony.

=== Technology and going green ===
As a way to market to Latino fans, many digital menu boards on the concession stands continuously switch from English to Spanish and back. Also, there are no hand-operated advertisement signs; ads are all computerized.

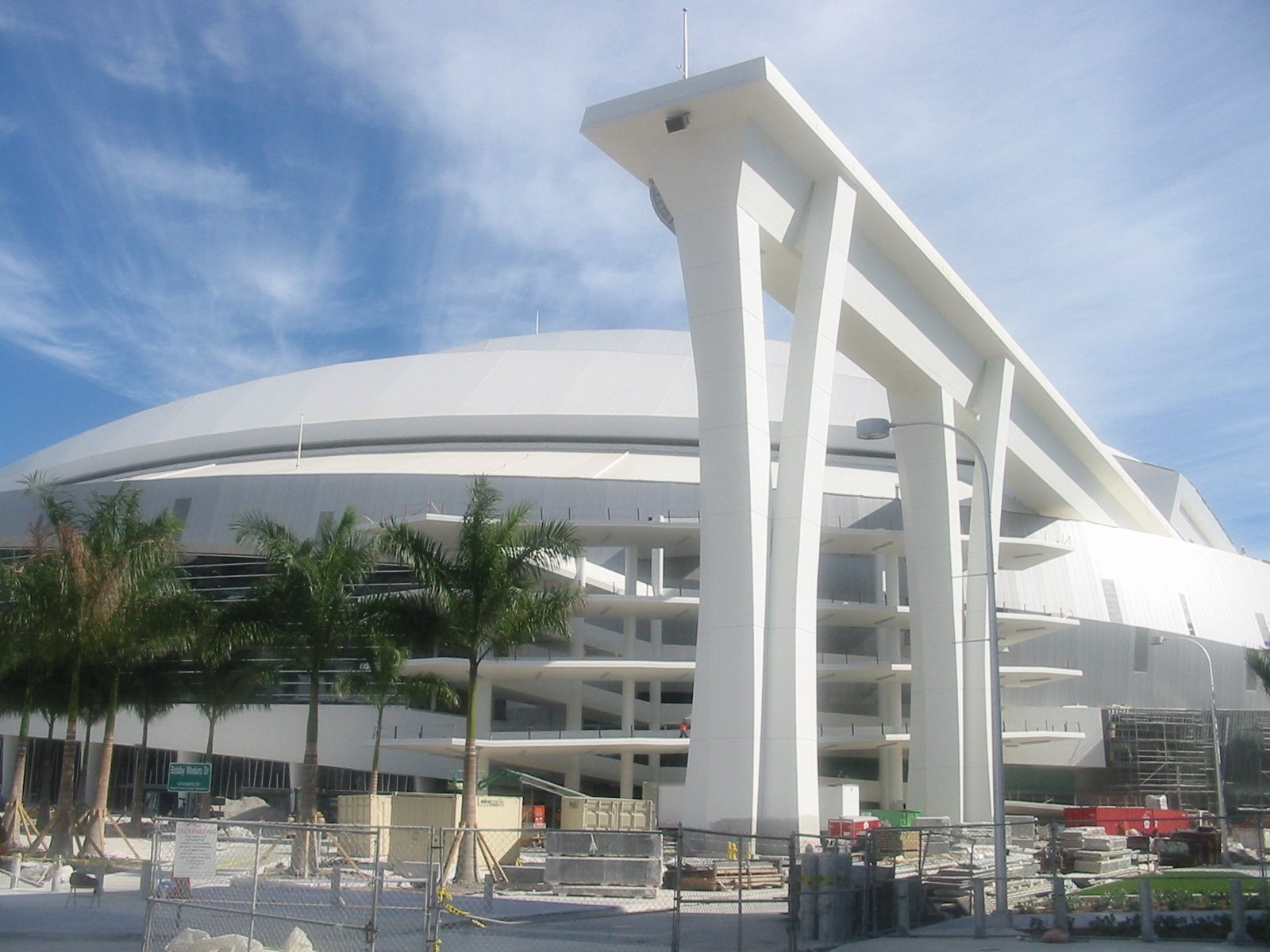
An LED show illuminates the super columns during night games, and a rubber membrane lining the roof reduces heat-island effect.

As part of its design, the venue is an environmentally-friendly green building in its use of materials, waste, and operation. The selection of building materials included sealants, paint, and adhesives with low VOC (volatile organic compounds) to maximize good indoor-air quality. A white rubber membrane lining the roof reflects rays to reduce "heat-island effect." The extensive glass facade allows in natural light during the day and reduces reliance on artificial light. The suites are built with replenishable bamboo paneling instead of hardwood. Most construction waste was hauled away to recycling centers during the building phase.

Palm trees and other native plant species around the building encourage biodiversity. Levy Restaurants, which runs some of the kitchens, gets most of its fresh-food supply directly from local farms that are within a 100-mile (160 km) radius of the stadium. Approximately 6 million US gallons (23,000,000 L) of water a year are saved with the use of 249 waterless urinals.

An early aim of the new ballpark was to become the first retractable-roof ballpark to be Silver Certified by Leadership in Energy and Environmental Design (LEED). On May 25, 2012, Marlins Park surpassed that goal by officially becoming the first MLB stadium—and the first retractable-roof stadium in any sport—to achieve LEED Gold Certification, anointing the facility as the most sustainable ballpark in MLB. The LEED-NC (New Construction) rating system credited the stadium with 40 points toward certification, the highest total of any LEED-certified park in the majors—the retro-contemporary ballparks of Oracle Park, Target Field and Nationals Park are the only others to achieve LEED certification.

Although they were publicly seeking silver, Loria had privately challenged engineers to shoot for the higher gold certification. The most difficult aspect of achieving gold, though—and one the design team had doubt it would be able to accomplish—was concerning the energy required to operate the retractable roof. Populous thought renewable energy would be a part of the sustainability equation but the park opened without solar panels. However, engineers optimized lighting, mechanical controls, and electrical aspects enough to achieve a 22.4% reduction in energy usage, which exceeded the 14% required for certification.

The U.S. Green Building Council noted an innovation which earned the facility three credits: Throughout areas of the stadium, including the clubhouses, the floor is made of a synthetic pouring made from recycled Nike shoes. The Council presented Loria with a plaque to signify the entire gold-certification achievement. Loria's intent was always to "not only build America's greatest new ballpark, but also its most environmentally friendly."

=== Problems with grass and retractable roof ===
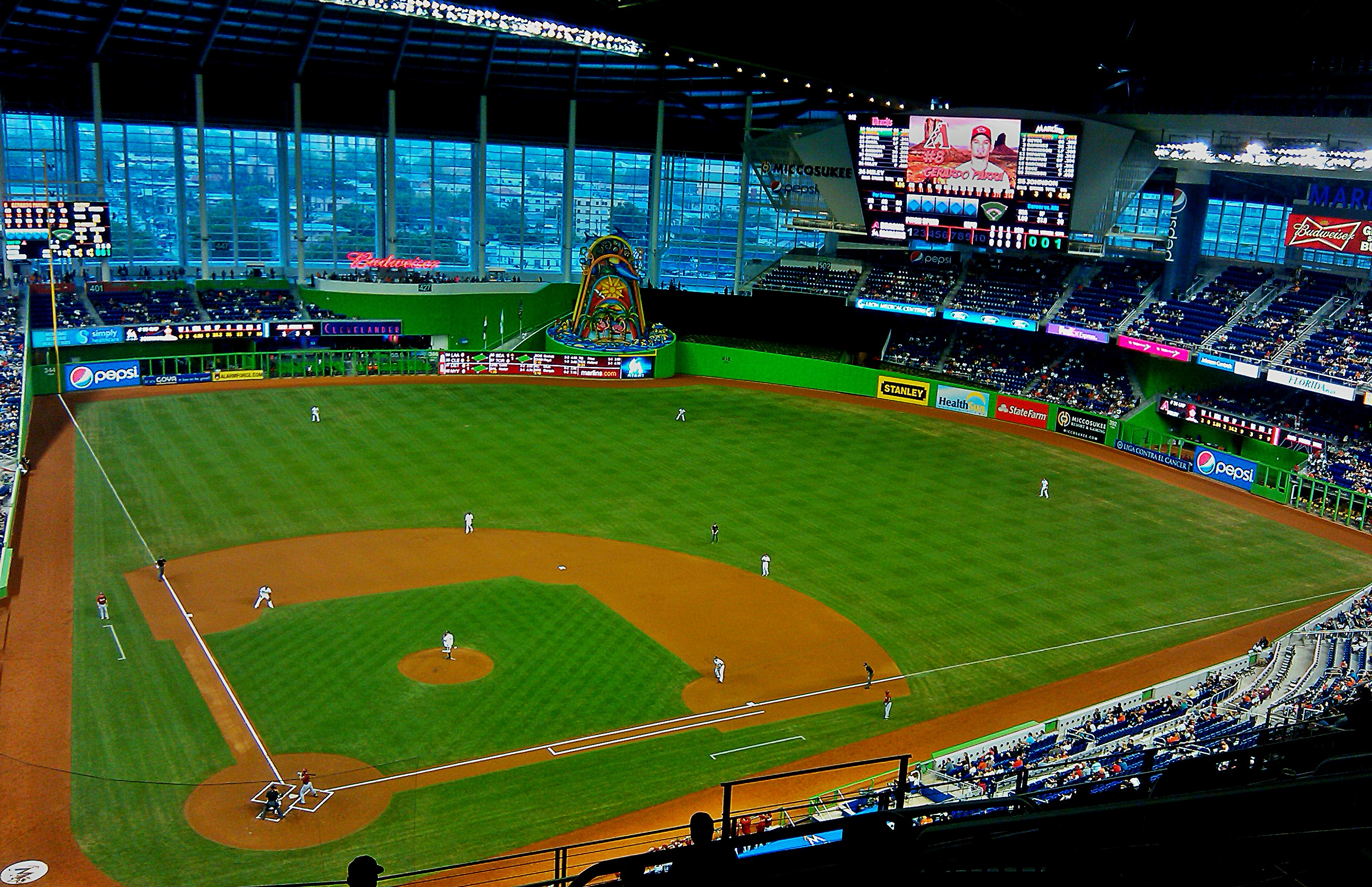
Panorama of LoanDepot Park

Since sod was first laid down in early February 2012, the grass has had difficulty growing under the frequently-closed roof. Planners had selected a strain of Bermuda grass, named Celebration, for its reputation of doing well in the shade. Even so, with the grass receiving only about 4 hours per day of sunlight, some of the sod kept turning brown. The worst-affected area is in deep right field where patches of dead sod have been replaced multiple times. Grow lights are pointed by groundskeepers on the area to nurse it to health on non-game days. As of 2014, the Bermuda grass has been replaced with Platinum TE Paspalum. Paspalum is better able to tolerate shaded areas.

During the first months of games played at the new park, at least four leaks showed themselves in the retractable roof. Fans sitting in at least four seating sections still got wet under the drippy roof on rainy days. Leaks have progressively appeared under different spots as stadium workers kept plugging them by opening up the roof panels and patching the joints.

=== 2016 renovation ===
In time for the start of the 2016 MLB season, the park underwent a $500,000 renovation, mainly to lower and move in the outfield walls. The changes were studied and enacted after Marlins players complained to president David Samson that their long balls were not resulting in as many doubles or home runs as in other parks. Since 2012, the park has logged the second fewest home runs of all Major League ballparks, behind San Francisco's Oracle Park. The renovation, engineered by the Populous architectural firm that designed the original park, eliminated the "Bermuda Triangle" in center field and reduced the length from home plate to the center field wall from 418 feet (127 m) to 407 feet (124 m). The walls around the outfield were lowered from heights up to 13 feet (4.0 m) to as low as 6 feet (1.8 m), which will allow outfielders to make leaping grabs for long balls. The dimensions down the left- and right-field lines and in the power alleys were not altered, retaining the park's reputation as a pitcher's park.

=== 2020 changes ===
On December 4, 2019, the team announced that the field surface would be converted to Shaw Sports B1K, an artificial turf surface installed by the Arizona Diamondbacks for Chase Field in 2019, and for the Texas Rangers in their new Globe Life Field. Also, the team announced that the center- and right-center field fences would be moved in, with the center-field fence being moved from 407 to 400 feet (124 to 122 m), and the right-center field fence being moved from 392 to 387 feet (119 to 118 m). The changes came after only 173 home runs were hit in 2019, which was the third-lowest mark in the league that season.

=== Miami Live! ===
In January 2025, the Marlins announced that they would be developing Miami Live! at the West Plaza in partnership with The Cordish Companies. The development will include indoor-outdoor dining and entertainment spaces and year-round activities with a planned opening date of 2026.

== Features ==
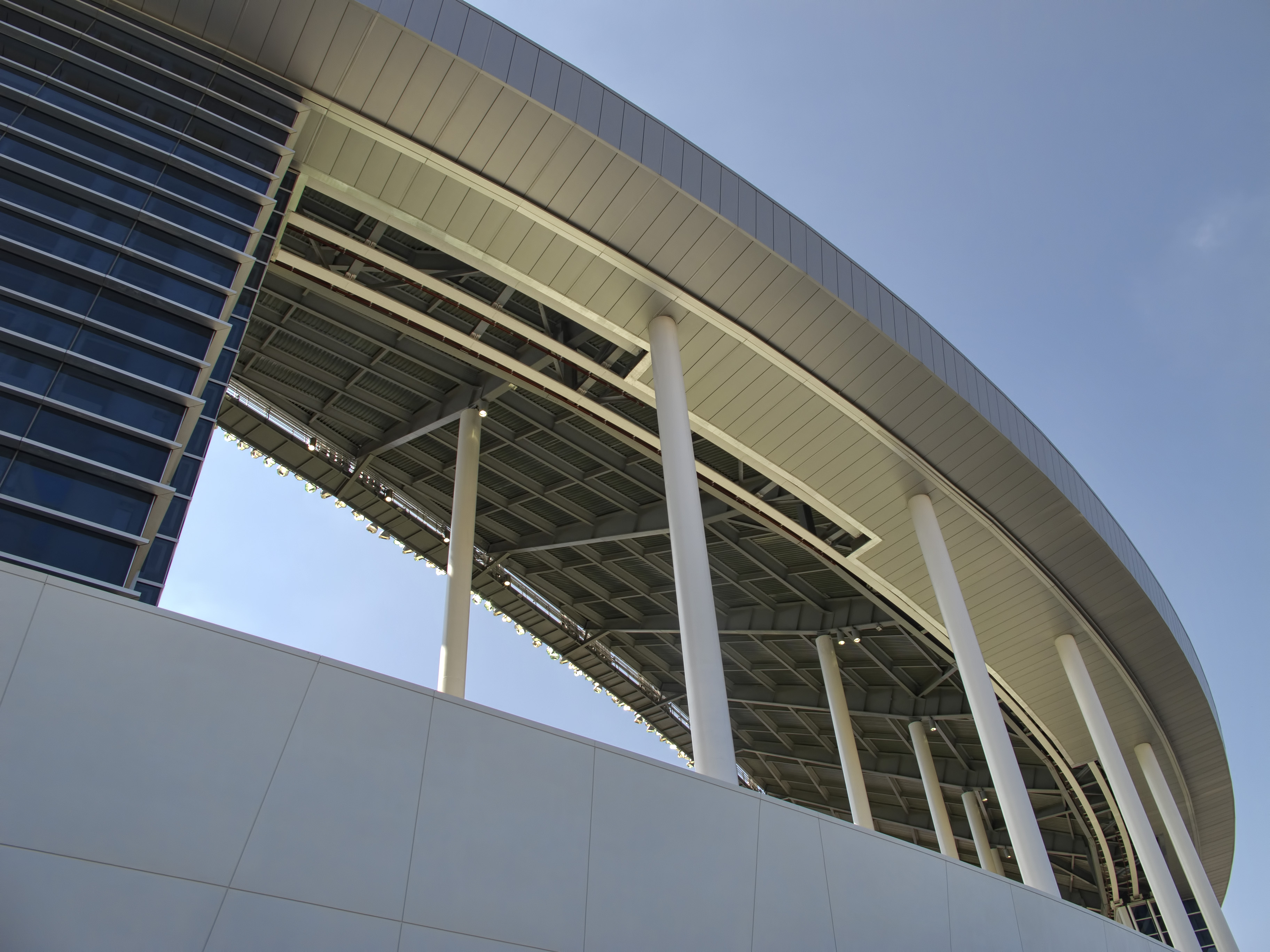
The east side with the windows retracted

The Marlins' $2.5 million home run sculpture. The right half of its base also formed part of "The Bermuda Triangle" quirk in the outfield fence between 2012 and 2016

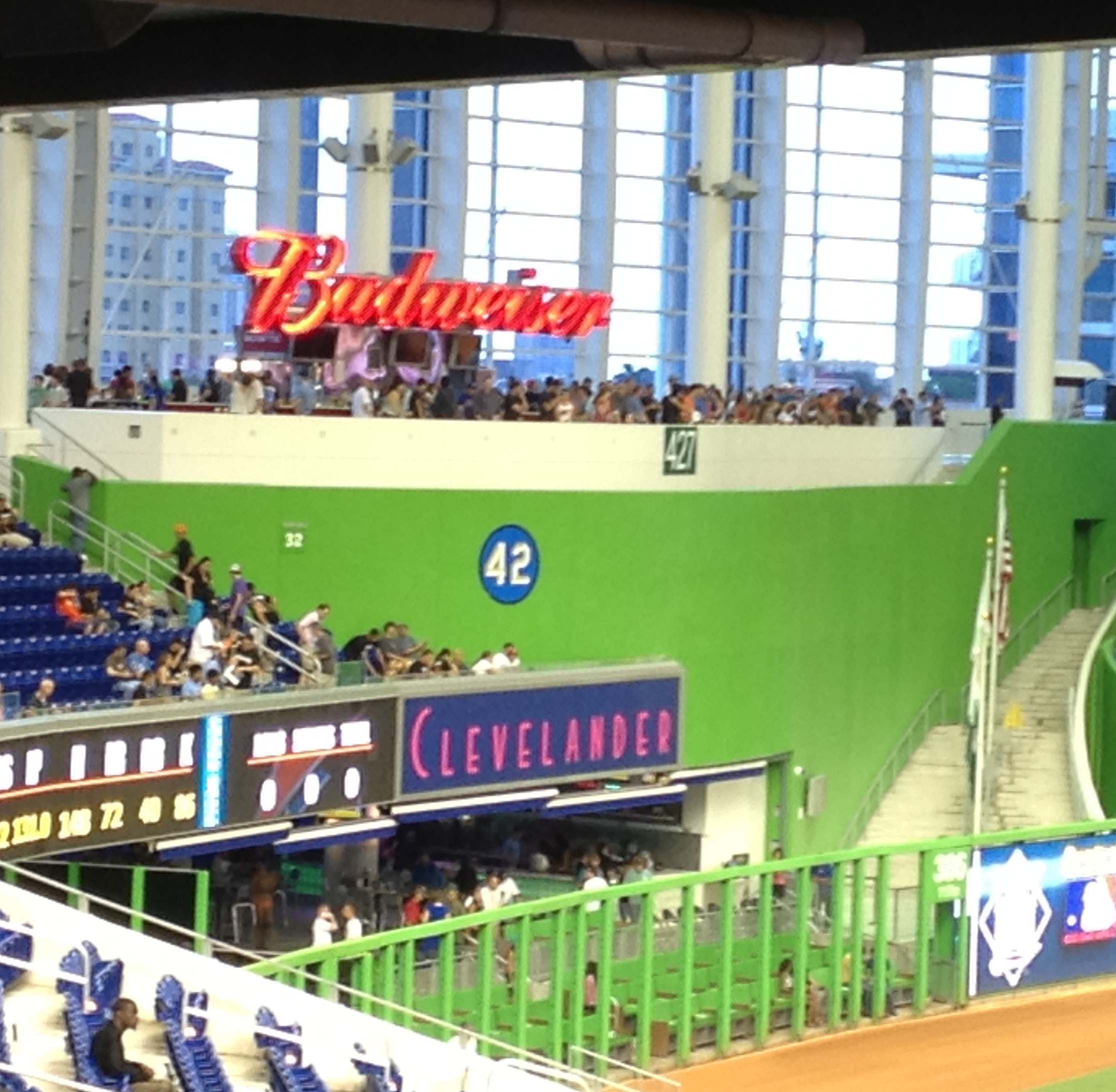
The Budweiser Bar and The Clevelander in left field, to the left of the HR feature (not seen)

The Marlins' front office commissioned several works of art and other notable features around the stadium.

- Retractable roof and outfield glass panels: The retractable roof consists of 8,300 tons of steel. The Marlins covered it with a white membrane because "we want to make sure we're not absorbing heat in the roof", said Claude Delorme, the Marlins executive vice president/ballpark development. Separate retractable glass panels offer uninterrupted views of the downtown Miami skyline, and also allow in a natural breeze when they are open. The six panels are a combined 240 feet (73 m) long and 60 feet (18 m) high. An air-conditioning system will cool the average temperature to 75 °F (24 °C) with the roof and glass panels closed. The Marlins expect for the roof to be closed for about 70 of the 81 home games and likely to remain open on some dry nights in April, when the weather is not too hot. It takes approximately 14½ minutes to open the roof, and 7–8 minutes to open the transparent outfield panels.
- Home run sculpture: Red Grooms designed a 65 and 75 feet (20 and 23 m) tall sculpture displayed behind the left center field wall, consisting of a tropical scene with clouds, flamingos, seagulls, marlins, and palm trees. Marlins home runs activate the sculpture, resulting in motion, a light show, and water blasts. It was budgeted at $2.5 million with funding provided by the county's Art in Public Places department. The piece is unnamed; the Miami Herald invited its readers to submit nickname ideas for the sculpture, with "the Marlinator" as the winner. The sculpture sparked heated conversation among Miami-Dade taxpayers well before the park opened and has since continued. The Miami Herald reported that many fans thought it was "tacky" or "ugly", while others felt it captured the "essence of Miami". Marlins players wondered if the upcoming sculpture could cause a distraction to left-handed batters. However, MLB officials have approved the batter's eye (after a separate area in dead center was repainted from fluorescent green to black) and so far, the sculpture has not been an issue for hitters. In 2018, after Derek Jeter took over as team CEO under a new ownership group, it was widely expected that the new ownership would seek permission to remove the unpopular sculpture as part of a larger series of operational changes; In October 2018, the Miami Art in Public Places trust voted to move the sculpture from the ballpark to the outdoor plaza; it was to be replaced by a new, multi-level standing room area. The sculpture is now located outside of the park and activates every 3:05 PM in honor of Miami's area code.
- Aquatic home plate backstop: (2012–2020) Dual bulletproof aquariums served as a home-plate backstop. They were built on each side of home plate and are positioned to prevent any disruption to players on the field. The aquarium to the right of home plate (when looking from the pitcher's mound) measured 34 feet (10 m) long and 36 inches (91 cm) high and held over 600 US gallons (2,300 L) of seawater, while the aquarium to the left was 24 feet (7.3 m) in length and held 450 US gallons (1,700 L) of water. Each aquarium was constructed using a durable fiberglass structure, while crystal-clear acrylic panels 1.5 inches (3.8 cm) thick are used for the viewing windows that run the entire length of the aquariums. To safeguard the exhibits from impacts, Lexan was installed in front and in back of the acrylic panels to protect the aquariums from foul balls, errant pitches or any other unexpected contact. The fish tanks were removed after the 2020 season.
- Clevelander Bar and swimming pool (2012–2019): The Clevelander was a South Beach-themed nightclub that takes its name from a 100-year-old Miami institution. It held approximately 240 guests and offered a variety of food selections, entertainment (dancers, DJs and body painting), field-level seating, and a swimming pool. The poolside bar and grill was available on gamedays for private events for groups, on a per-game basis. The Clevelander and its swimming pool were removed from the park beginning 2020. It has since been replaced with a sports lounge called the Bullpen Bar & Grill.
- Bobblehead museum: A display showcases hundreds of bobblehead dolls from all over baseball, jiggling in unison.
- Commemorative marker: Daniel Arsham and Snarkitecture were commissioned to design a work to commemorate the former Miami Orange Bowl, which was demolished to make way for the new stadium. The piece uses the letters from the original "Miami Orange Bowl" sign as the basis for the 10-foot-tall (3.0 m) orange concrete letters rearranged across the east plaza so that they form new words as visitors move around them. They spell out both "ORANGE BOWL" and "GAME WON", for example.
- Parking complex and trolley service: The stadium is surrounded by four main parking garages along with six other lots, with a combined capacity of about 5,600 vehicles. The garages extend the contemporary design of the park with walls of pastel, Miami-Deco tiles. Garages are conveniently color-coded with pennant banners to match their corresponding color quadrants of the stadium: blue for home plate, yellow for first base, red for third base, and green for center field. In addition to the main commemorative marker, three mosaic panels from the old Orange Bowl hang on the facade of the southwestern garage, and a few of the old bowl's plastic seats punctuate a small plaza in front of the parking structure, as a nod to the past. As final public art project, large-scale bit-map paintings of children peering through a ballpark chain-link fence are being installed on the garages. Parking tickets are pre-purchased like seating tickets, raising the probability that parking spaces could be sold out even before game day. Due to the limited public transportation at LoanDepot Park, free trolleys shuttle fans to and from the Downtown Miami Civic Center or a nearby train station on game days only.
- Entrance/West Plaza paving: Pathways paved on the west entrance plaza of the stadium are created by Venezuelan-born and Parisian-based kinetic-op artist Carlos Cruz-Diez. It's entitled Chromatic Induction in a Double Frequency and uses 1-inch tiles to form a rhythmic pattern that perceptibly changes for visitors as they walk on it and at times almost seems to vibrate.
- Column illumination: Daniel Arsham and Snarkitecture were also selected for the lighting of the four super columns which support the retractable roof. The lighting is designed to give the illusion of the columns being concealed and revealed through programmable LEDs that fade up and down the columns in subtly shifting patterns, evoking the rhythm of a human breath.
- Modern and contemporary artist replicas: A large, ceramic-tile reproduction of a Joan Miró mural (1930s) is on a promenade wall behind home plate. A reprint of pop culture artist Roy Lichtenstein's painting of "The Manager" (1962) is displayed near the main concourse. A nearly 40-foot (12 m) reprint of Kenny Scharf's mixed media work "Play Ball!" (2011) is in a corner behind the team store.
- Sports & The Arts graphics: In addition to other artwork, California-based consultant "Sports & The Arts" was retained to curate the photography and wall and column graphics components. Nearly 500 pieces of photography and over 15,000 square feet (1,400 m^{2}) of wall and column treatments were planned.
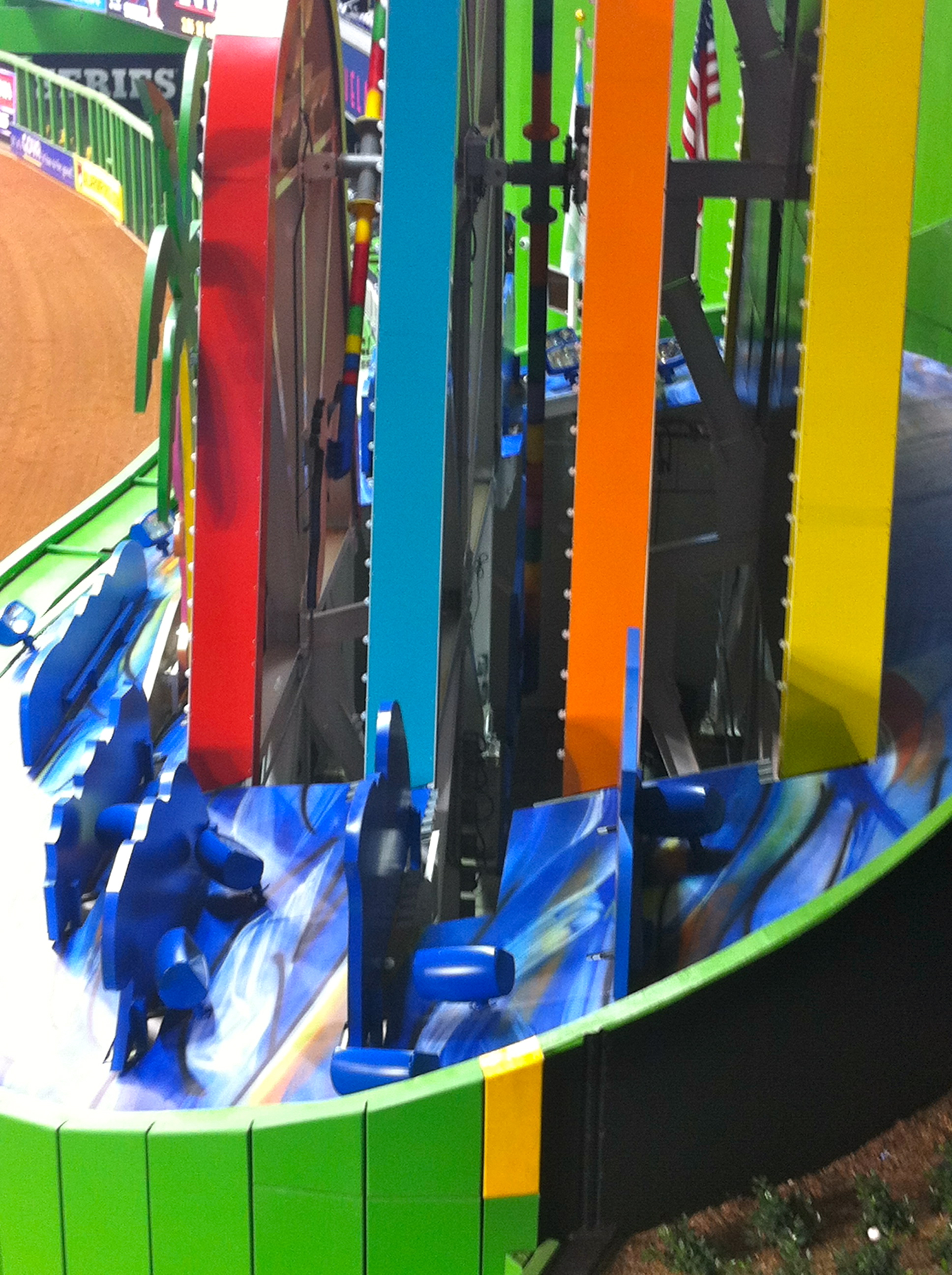
A side view of the home run structure at LoanDepot Park

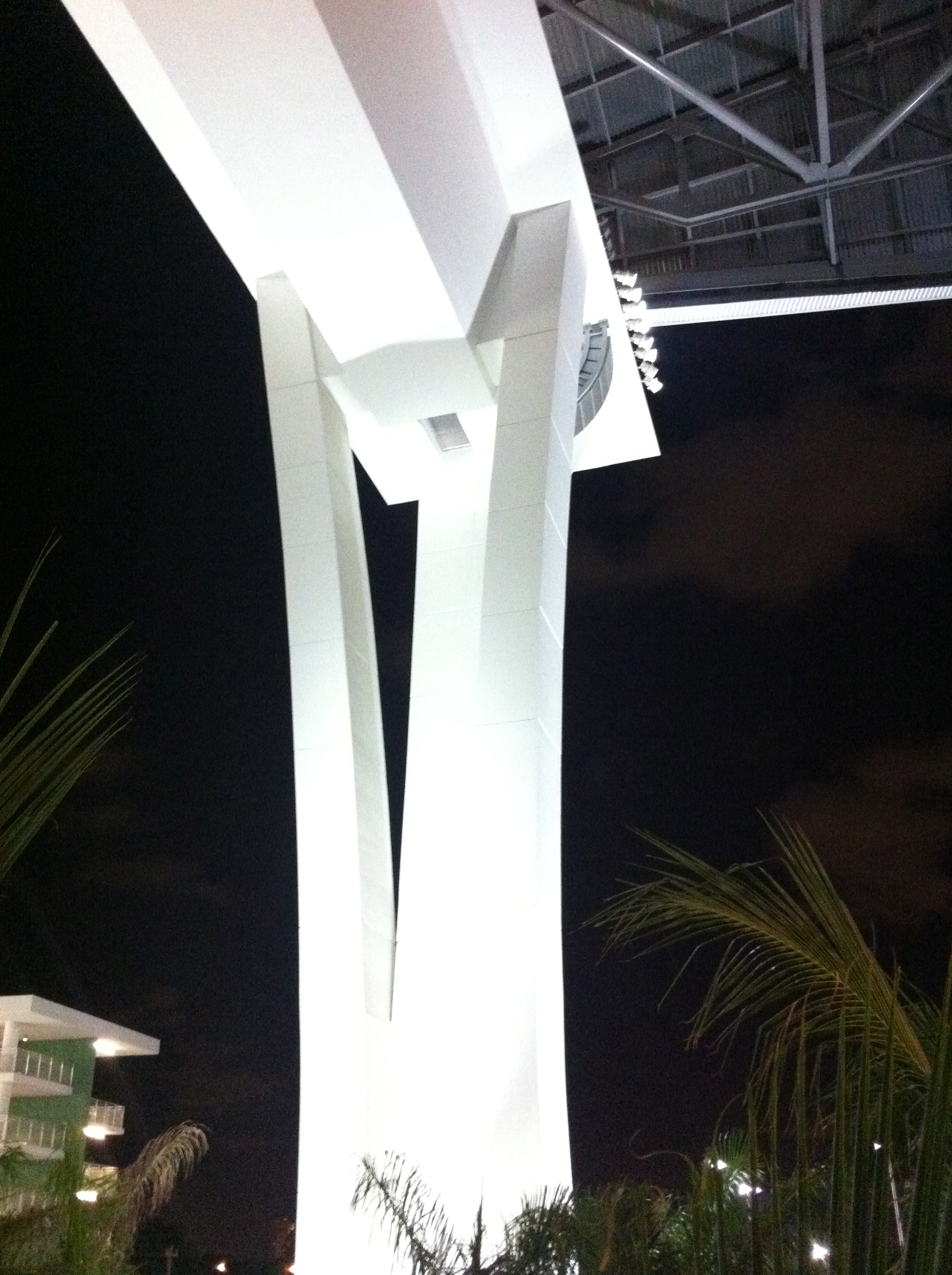
One of the columns at LoanDepot Park that supports the roof when the roof is opened

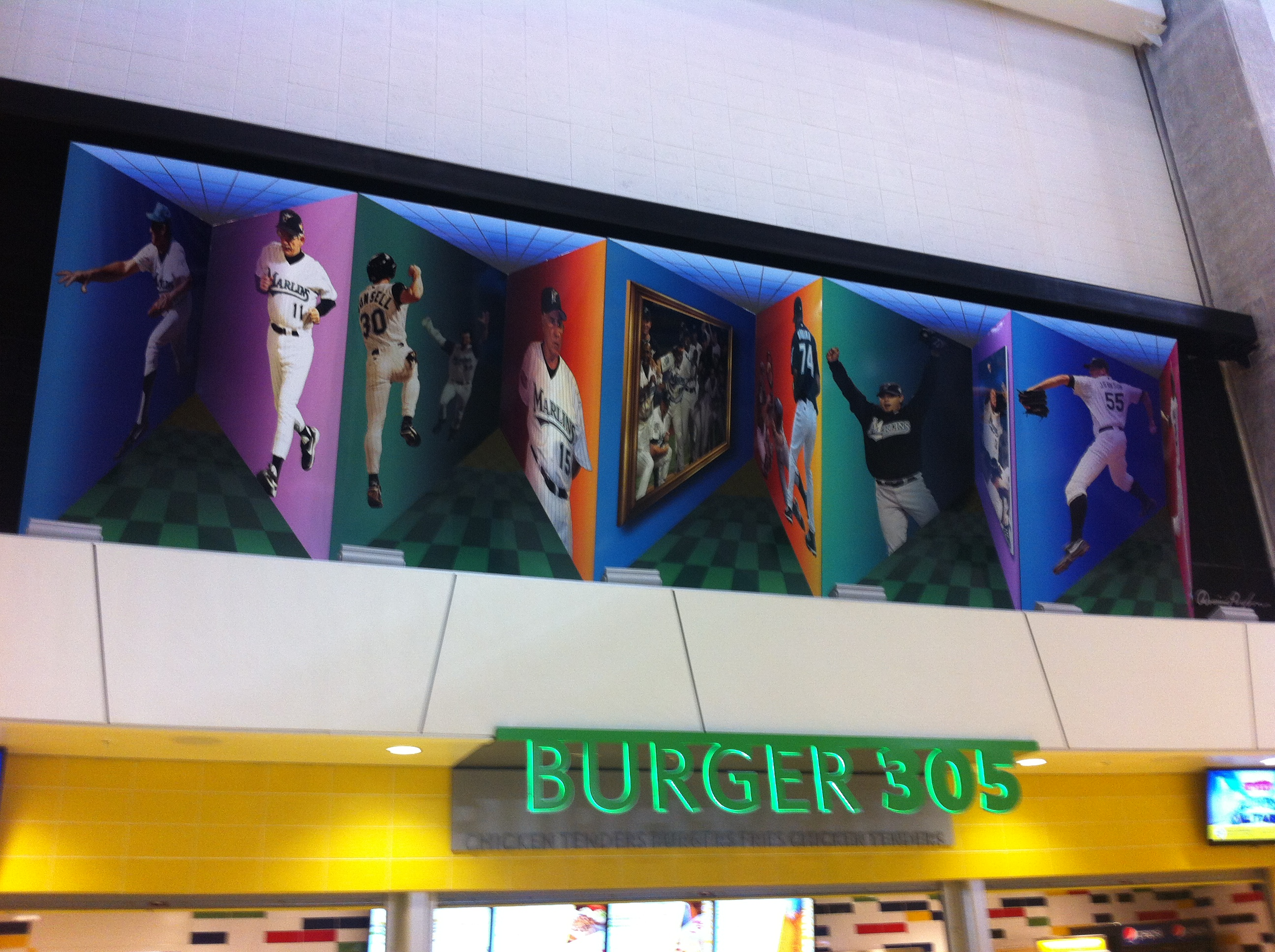
Baseball in Motion by Dominic Pangborn

== Notable baseball events ==
Marlins Park hosted Pool 2 during the second round of the 2013 World Baseball Classic on March 12–16, 2013.

In September 2013, Henderson Álvarez pitched a no-hitter against the Detroit Tigers, recording four strikeouts and one walk. The game was scoreless up to the 9th inning. In the bottom of 9th, with the Marlins at bat and the bases loaded, Luke Putkonen surrendered the game-winning run by unleashing a wild pitch, allowing Marlins right fielder Giancarlo Stanton to score from 3rd base. This no-hitter was unusual in that it ended with a walk-off wild pitch. This was the first no-hitter to be pitched at Marlins park, with the next no-hitter being pitched by Marlins pitcher Edinson Vólquez in June 2017.

The Marlins and their fans experienced the first rain delay at Marlins Park on April 6, 2015. During a sold-out Opening Day game against the Atlanta Braves, a shower moved over the stadium with the roof open. The bottom of the 2nd inning was interrupted for 16 minutes while the roof was closed; the field, however, was sufficiently wet to cause players to slip several times during the remainder of the game, a 2–1 Braves victory.

On June 20, 2016, Marlins Park saw the most-ever home runs hit in one game at the park, with eight in a 5–3 win by the Colorado Rockies over the Marlins. This also set a Major League record for solo home runs accounting for all the scoring in a game, surpassing the previous record of five.

From March 9 to 13, 2017, Marlins Park hosted Pool C in the four-pool, first round of the 2017 World Baseball Classic.

Marlins Park hosted the 2017 Major League Baseball All-Star Game in July 2017. This was the first time the Miami Marlins hosted the midsummer classic, after the 2000 All-Star Game was moved to Atlanta.

From March 11 to 20, 2023, Marlins Park hosted Pool D and the knockout rounds of the 2023 World Baseball Classic. The championship game was held on March 21. It will also host Pool D, the quarterfinals, and the championship game of the 2026 World Baseball Classic.

On October 12, 2024, the Savannah Bananas played the Party Animals in a game of Banana Ball to a sold-out crowd.

== Non-baseball events ==
=== College football ===
The Miami Beach Bowl college football bowl game was played at Marlins Park every December from 2014 through 2016. The bowl was moved to Frisco, Texas for 2017 and is now known as the Frisco Bowl.

On November 23, 2019, the FIU Panthers upset the Miami Hurricanes 30–24 in a nonconference football game.

=== Soccer ===
The stadium hosted its first non-baseball event when Venezuela and Nigeria national teams played a match on November 14, 2012. The field was configured for soccer by covering the infield dirt, placing one goal near the Marlins' dugout on the third-base side and the other in front of the visitors' bullpen in right field.

In January 2013, Marlins Park began hosting the Miami Soccer Challenge as part of a three-year partnership with Global Football Challenge.

==== International soccer matches ====
Date	Winning Team	Result	Losing Team	Tournament	Spectators
November 14, 2012	Nigeria	3–1	Venezuela	Friendly	13,372
February 10, 2016	Mexico	2–0	Senegal	Friendly	15,588
May 29, 2016	Colombia	3–1	Haiti	Friendly	22,011

=== Ice hockey ===
The stadium hosted the 2026 NHL Winter Classic between the New York Rangers and the Florida Panthers, which marked the National Hockey League's southernmost outdoor stadium game. The game took place on January 2, 2026, with New York winning 5–1 in front of 36,153 fans. The game was also the Florida Panthers first game in Miami since 1998.

=== Concerts ===
Date	Artist	Opening act(s)	Tour / Concert name	Attendance	Revenue	Notes
April 27, 2016	Beyoncé	DJ Khaled	The Formation World Tour	36,656 / 36,656	$5,252,615	Lil Wayne, Future, Rick Ross, Trick Daddy, Yo Gotti and 2 Chainz joined DJ Khaled during the opening act.
August 8, 2017	Guns N' Roses	Sturgill Simpson	Not in This Lifetime ... Tour	37,834 / 37,834	$4,102,883	
June 16, 2023	Romeo Santos	—	Fórmula, Vol. 3: La Gira			
November 23, 2024	Pink	Sheryl Crow; KidCutUp	Summer Carnival			Cancelled due to illness.
July 30, 2025	Chris Brown	Summer Walker; Bryson Tiller	Breezy Bowl XX Tour	37,810 / 37,810	$6,105,450	

=== Other events ===
The stadium was scheduled to host the 22nd annual World Music Awards on December 22, 2012, but the event was canceled because of logistical and multiple visa issues, as well as the stated intent to observe the national mourning of the Sandy Hook Elementary School shooting.

On April 20, 2013, the stadium hosted "America's Night of Hope" with Joel and Victoria Osteen, an annual stadium event for Joel Osteen Ministries.

On January 21–22, 2017, the stadium hosted the Race of Champions, an all-star racecar competition.

Jennifer Lopez and Marc Anthony headlined “One Voice: Somos Live! A Concert For Disaster Relief” a benefit concert to raise money for Feeding America, Save the Children, Habitat for Humanity, United Way, UNICEF, and Unidos for Puerto Rico in the wake of natural disasters in Puerto Rico, as well as the southern United States, Mexico, and other areas of the Caribbean on October 14, 2017. The benefit concert was broadcast on Telemundo and Univision.

Marlins Park has hosted Monster Jam events since February 2018 as part of their stadium championship tours.

Jehovah's Witnesses hosted the "Love Never Fails" convention at the stadium on May 24–26 and July 5–7, 2019.

Temporary seating was erected in center field for Opening Night of Super Bowl LIV on January 27, 2020.

Kanye West hosted a listening party for his album Donda 2 on February 2, 2022.

The field served as the finish line for season 37 of The Amazing Race, which aired in spring 2025.

== Ballpark firsts ==
Statistic	Spring Training Exhibition; April 1, 2012	Opening Night; April 4, 2012
Attendance	27,152 (limited)	36,601 (sellout)
Ceremonial first pitch	—	Muhammad Ali
First pitch	Ricky Nolasco (hit)	Josh Johnson (strike)
First batter	Derek Jeter	Rafael Furcal
First hit	Derek Jeter (double; 1st inning)	Carlos Beltrán (single; 1st inning)
First out	Curtis Granderson (groundout to 1B)	Rafael Furcal (groundout to SS)
First home run	Gaby Sánchez (solo) off CC Sabathia	—
First strikeout	Mark Teixeira (swinging) by Ricky Nolasco	Josh Johnson (swinging) by Kyle Lohse
First win	George Kontos	Kyle Lohse
First loss	Chad Gaudin	Josh Johnson

=== Notable and technical firsts ===
Statistic	Date	Player(s)/Team(s)
First game	March 5, 2012	Christopher Columbus High School 6, Belen Jesuit Preparatory School 4
Ceremonial first pitch	March 5, 2012	Ex-Mayor Manny Diaz and Archbishop Thomas Wenski
First home run (regular season)	April 13, 2012	J. D. Martinez (Houston Astros) off Edward Mujica
First Marlins home run (regular season)	April 15, 2012	Omar Infante off J. A. Happ (Houston Astros)

== Construction gallery ==
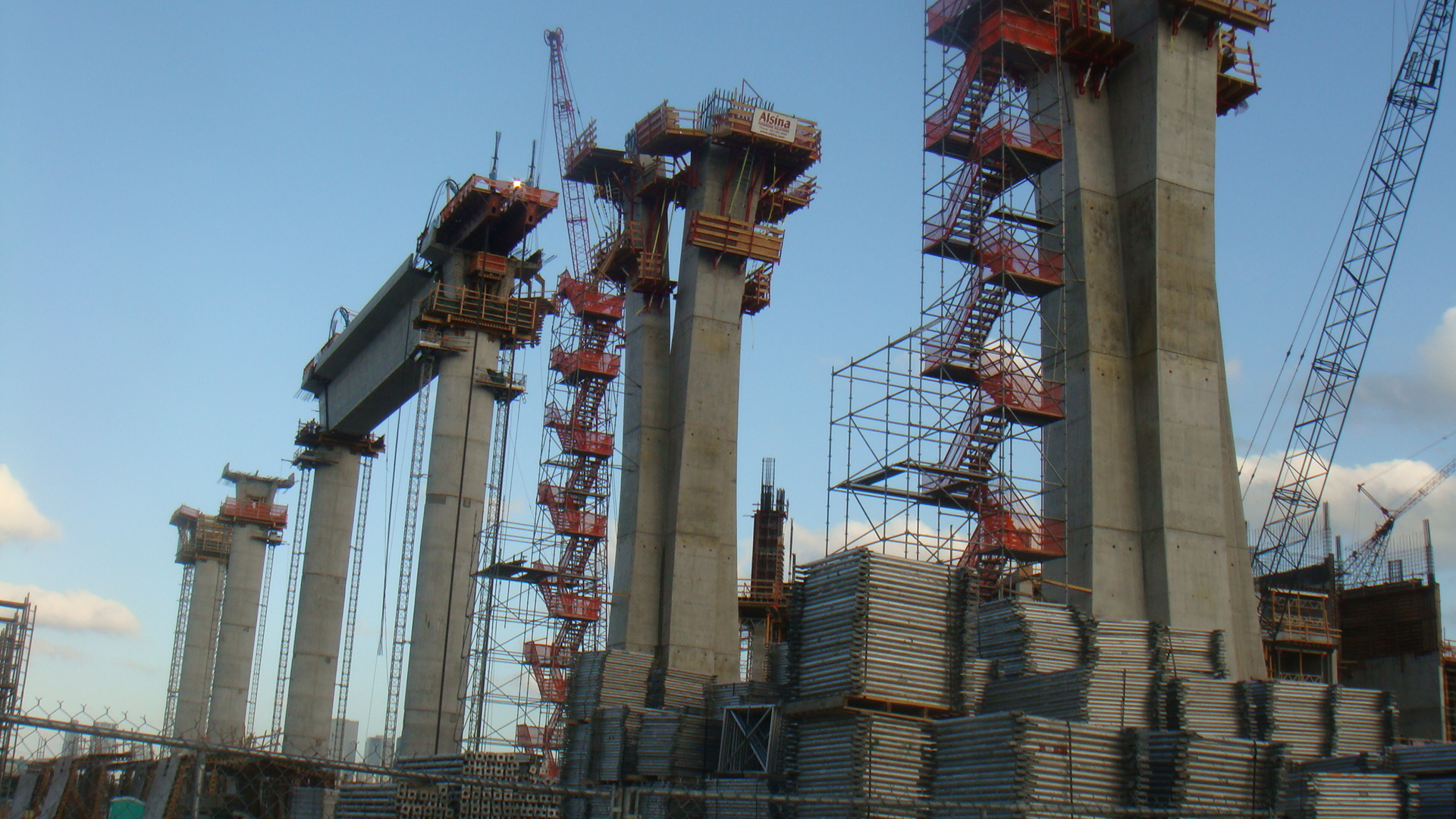
The super-columns are all nearly complete, with one crossbeam already in place, which will support the retractable roof, February 6, 2010

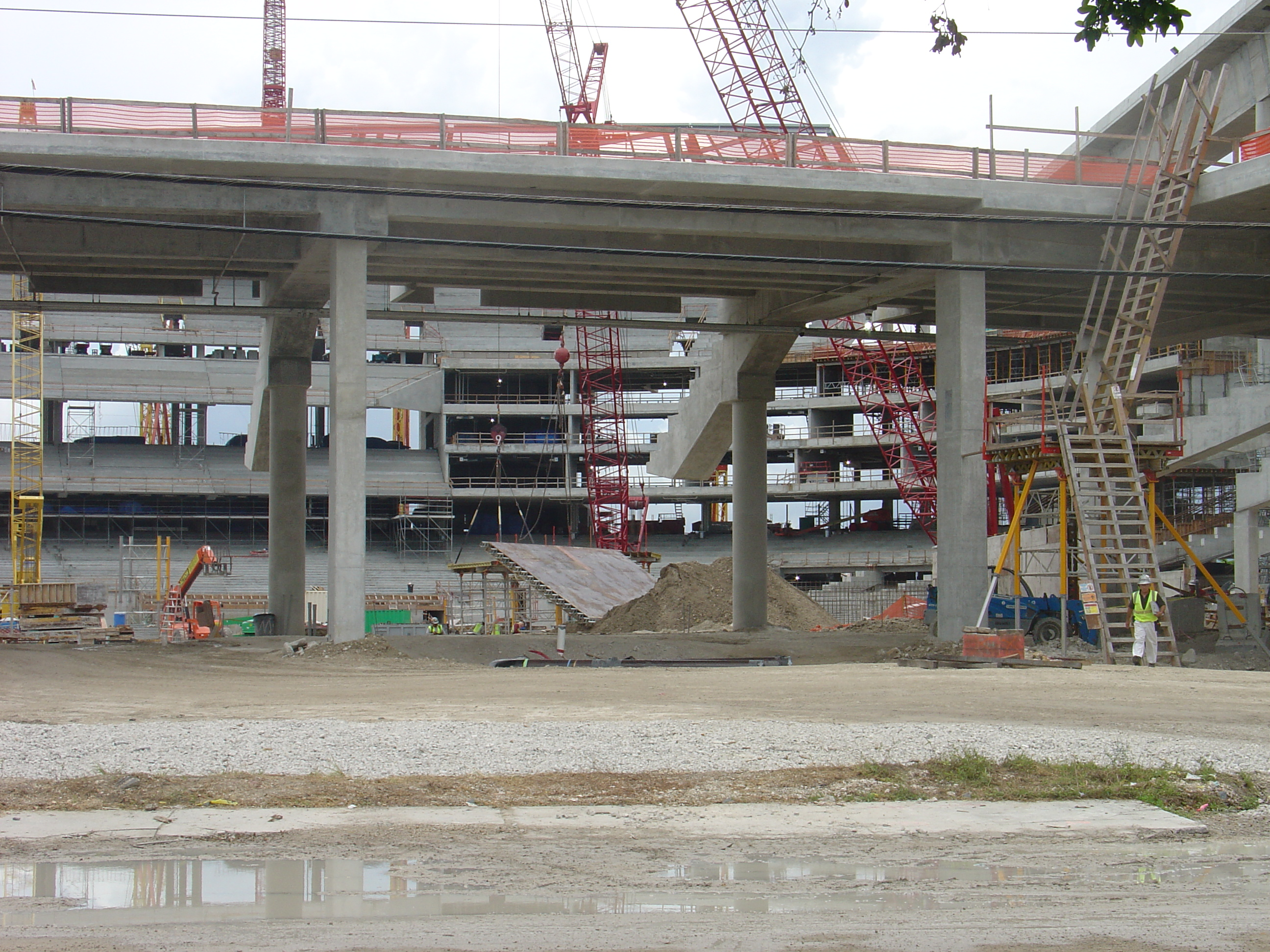
The site on July 2, 2010. The interior bowl is being completed on the west side, from a view at the outfield

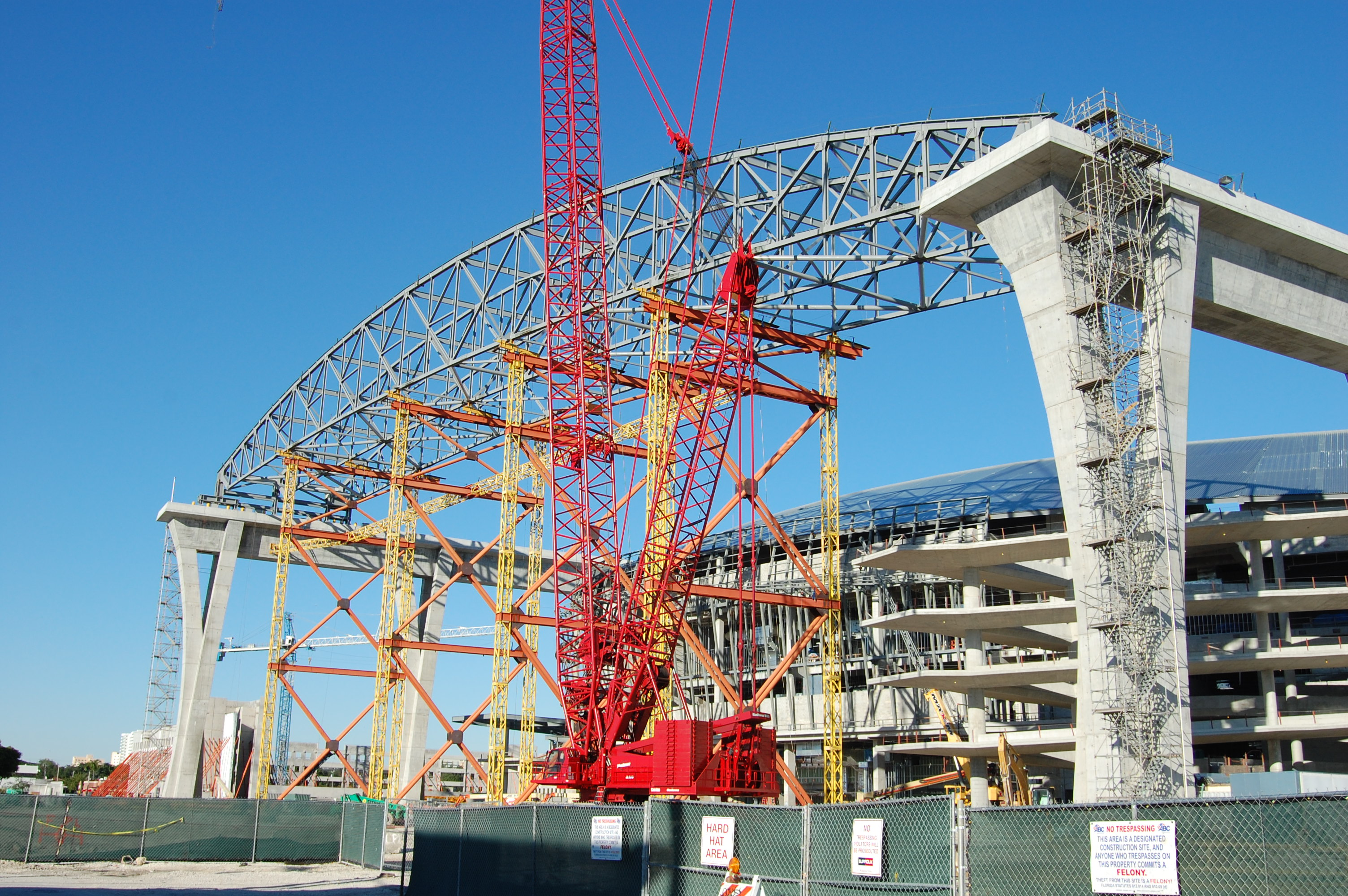
The site on November 6, 2010. The main center roof being constructed

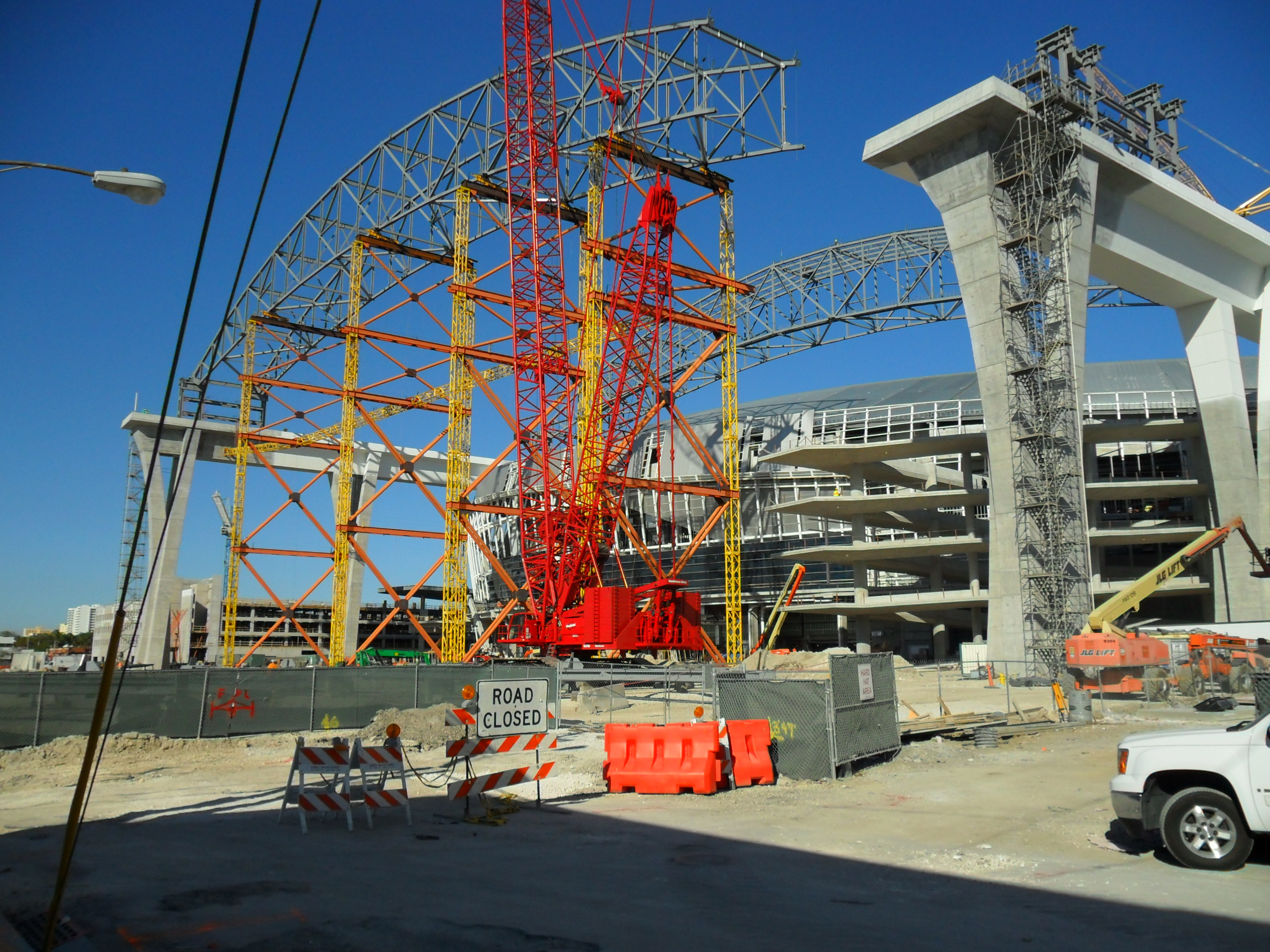
February 15, 2011

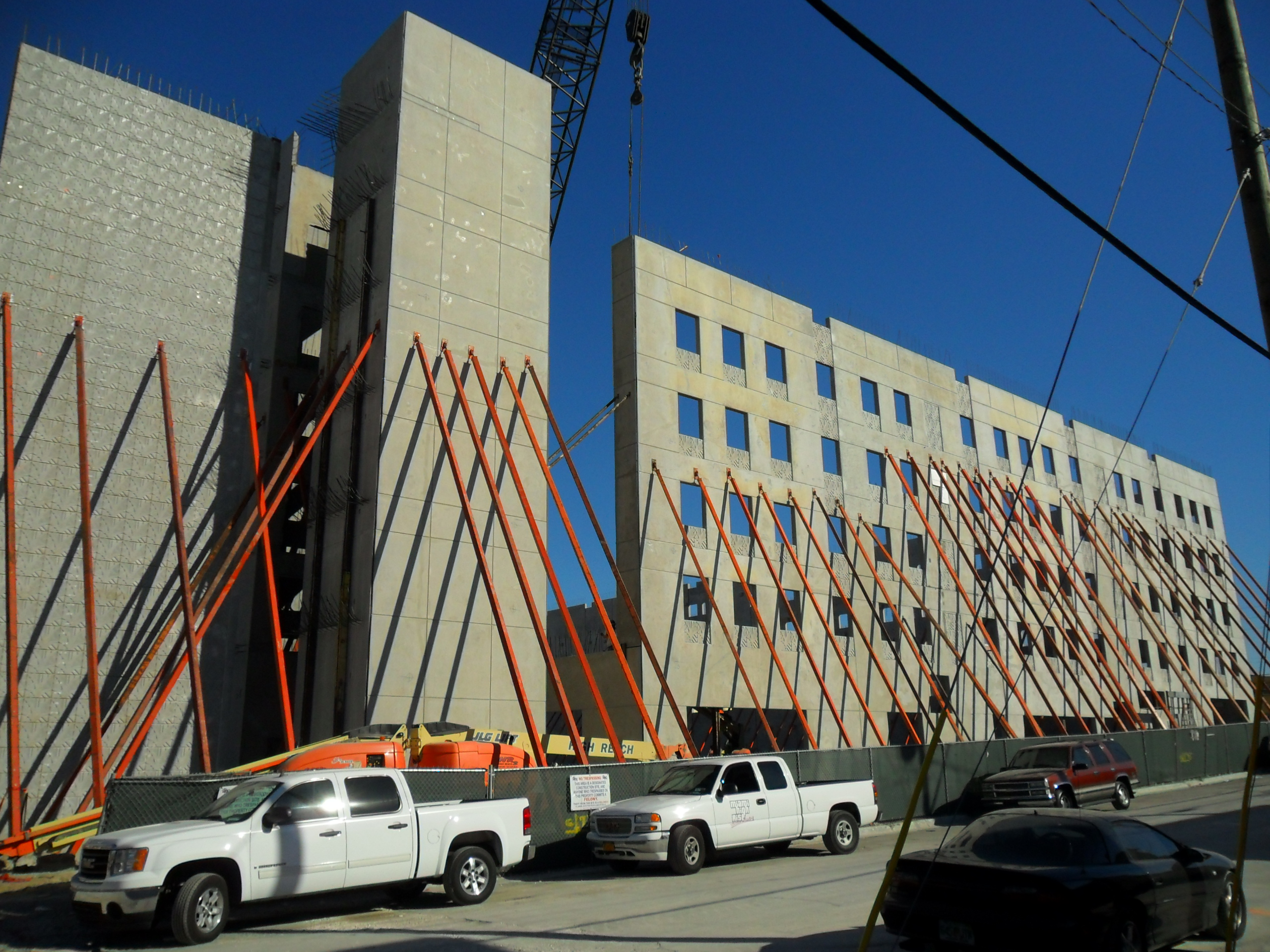
Adjacent parking structure on February 15, 2011

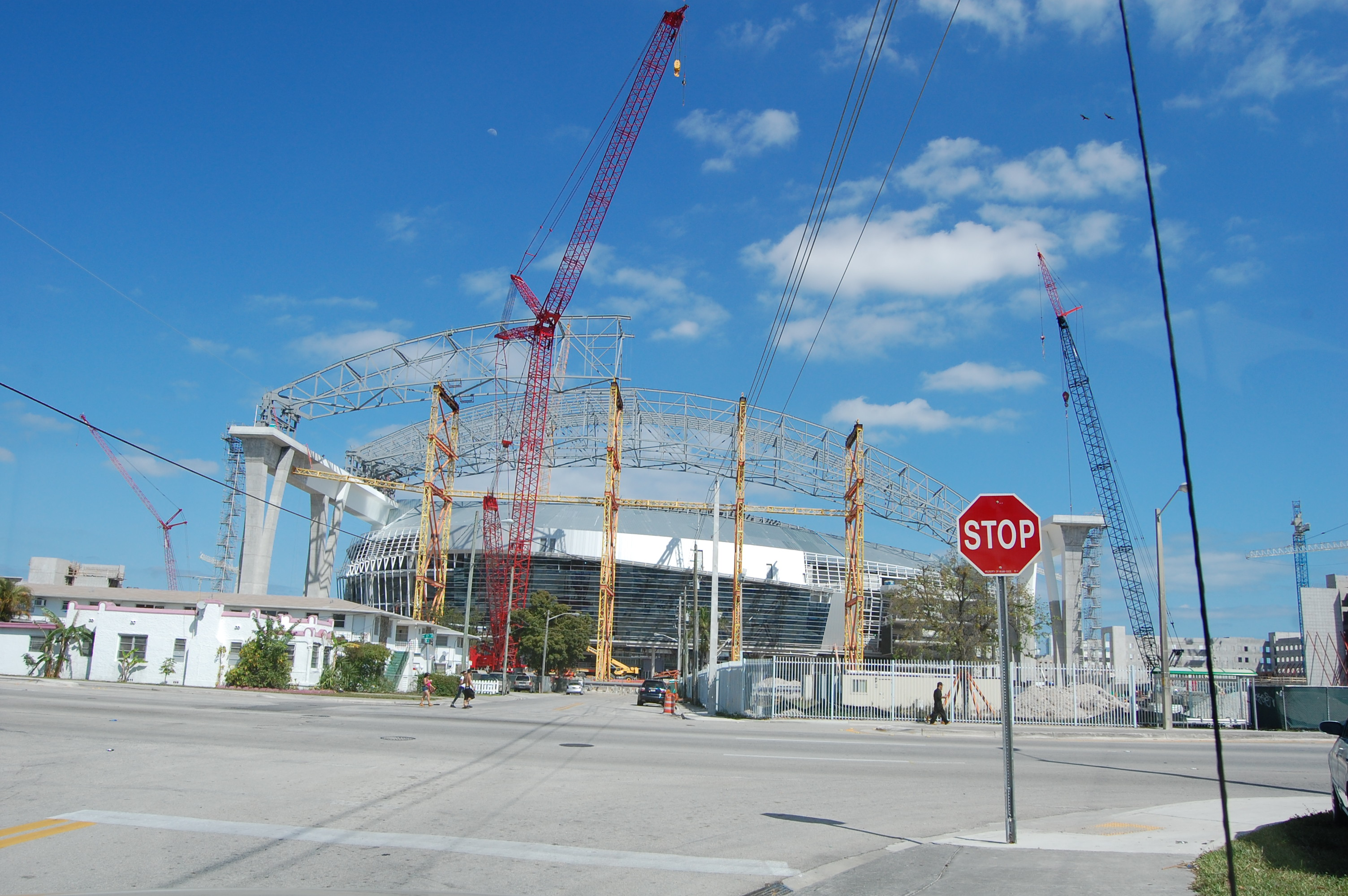
The site two weeks before completion of the final roof panel on March 13, 2011

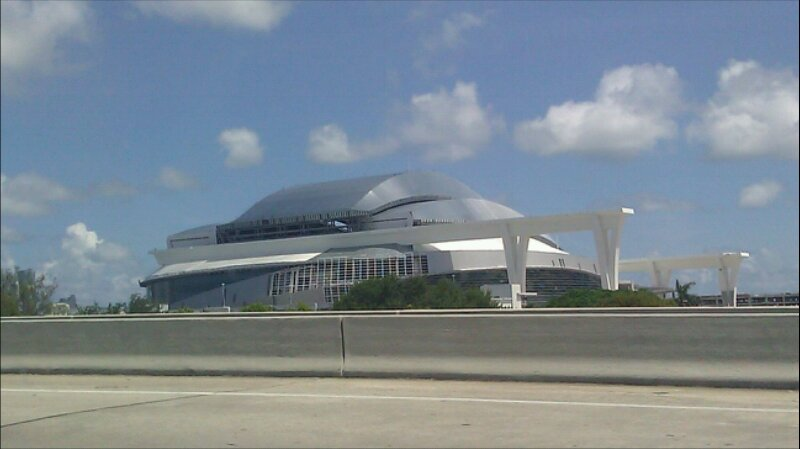
The site on August 13, 2011, as seen from the Dolphin Expressway (SR 836) traveling east

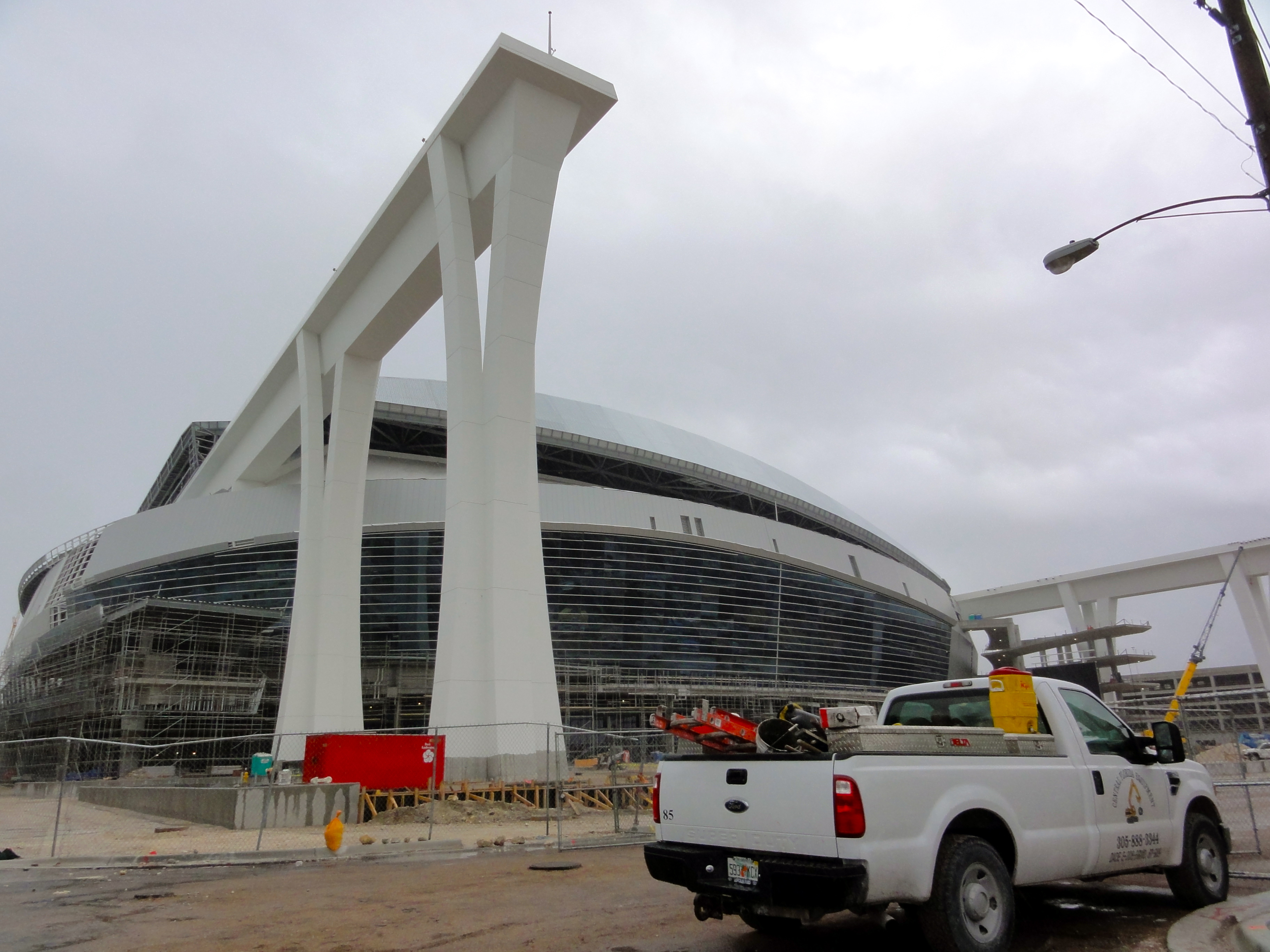
Construction on August 25, 2011

== In popular culture ==
Fleeca Field in the 2026 video game Grand Theft Auto VI is based on LoanDepot Park.

== See also ==
- Kaseya Center, an arena in Downtown Miami for the Miami Heat of the NBA, which opened December 1999
- Hard Rock Stadium, located in Miami Gardens, home of the NFL's Miami Dolphins and Miami Hurricanes for college football and former home of the Marlins, which opened August 1987
- Miami Orange Bowl, football stadium, which opened in 1937 and was demolished in 2008 to make room for LoanDepot Park. Former home of the annual Orange Bowl post-season college-football game, as well as the NFL's Miami Dolphins and college football's Miami Hurricanes. Site of Super Bowls II, III, V, X, and XIII. Also frequently used for soccer and concerts.
- Amerant Bank Arena, an arena in Sunrise, Florida for the Florida Panthers of the NHL, which opened October 1998.
- Miami Arena, a multi-purpose arena, which opened in 1988 and was demolished in 2008. Former home of the NBA's Miami Heat and the NHL's Florida Panthers.

Events and tenants
Preceded by Sun Life Stadium	Home of the Miami Marlins; 2012 – Present	Succeeded by current
Preceded by none	Home of the Miami Beach Bowl; 2014–2016	Succeeded by relocation to Frisco, Texas as the Frisco Bowl
Preceded by Petco Park	Host of the Major League Baseball All-Star Game; 2017	Succeeded by Nationals Park
