= Lyric Theater (Miami) =

Theater in Miami, Florida, United States

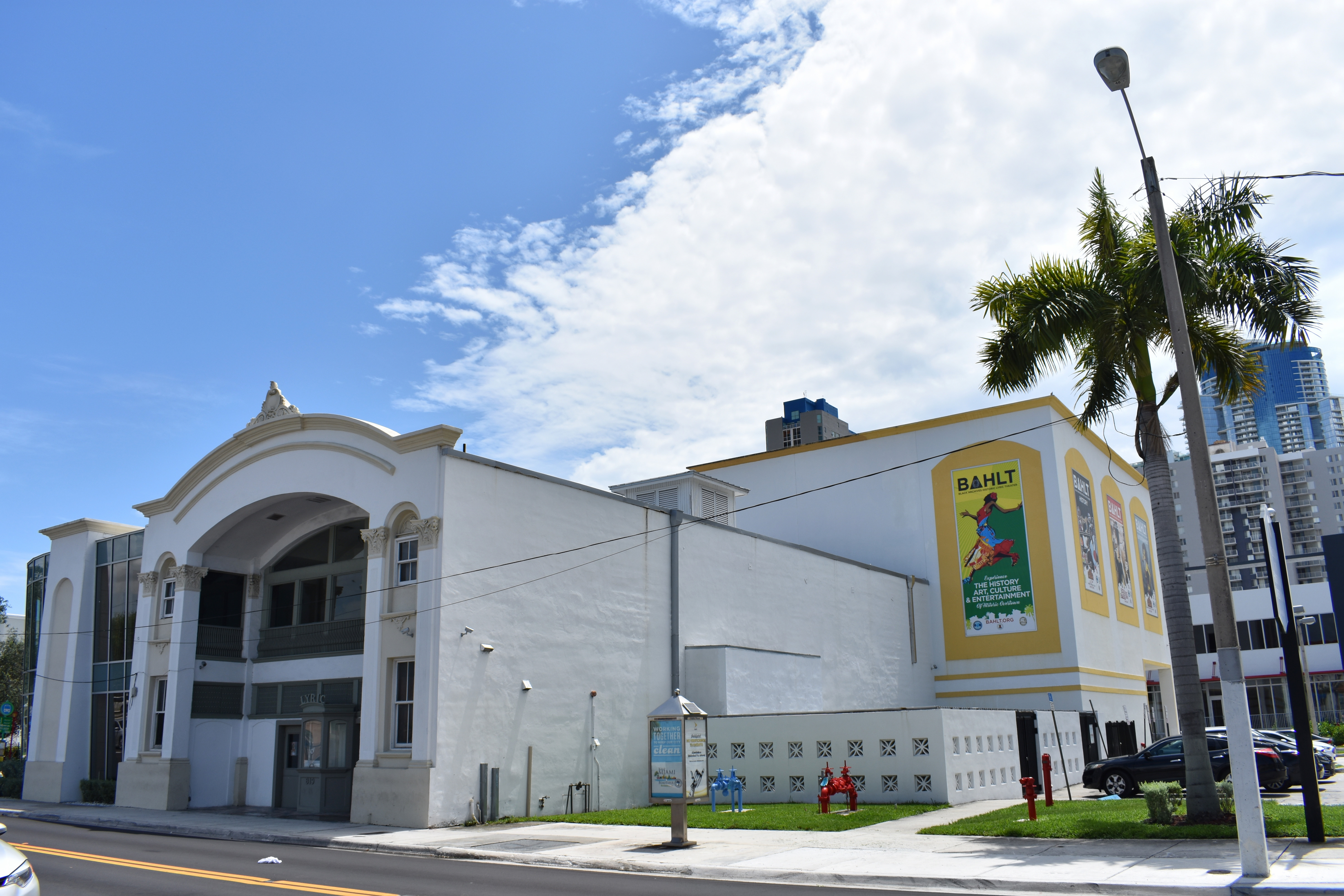

- Location within Miami Location within Florida Location within the United States
- Address: 819 NW Second Avenue
- Location: Miami, Florida
- Coordinates: 25°46′54.8″N 80°11′52.8″W
- Owner: The Black Archives History & Research Foundation of South FL, Inc.
- Capacity: 390
- Public transit: Historic Overtown/Lyric Theatre

Construction
- Opened: 1913
- Renovated: 1999, 2005, 2014

Website
- www.bahlt.org
- Lyric Theater
- U.S. National Register of Historic Places
- Architectural style: Vernacular masonry
- MPS: Downtown Miami MRA
- NRHP reference No.: 88002965
- Added to NRHP: January 4, 1989

The Lyric Theater is a historic theater in Miami, Florida at 819 Northwest Second Avenue. It served Miami's African American community. On January 4, 1989, it was added to the U.S. National Register of Historic Places after being proposed by Dorothy Jenkins Fields.

Renamed the Black Archives Historic Lyric Theater Cultural Arts Complex (BAHLT), it is considered the oldest legitimate theater in Miami. Located west of Miami's downtown business district, it is a central focus for the Historic Overtown Folklife Village and a center of both black cultural pride and economic renewal.

== History ==
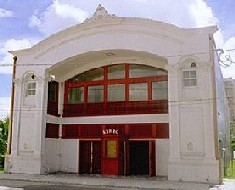
Lyric Theater

The 400-seat Lyric Theater was built, owned and operated by Geder Walker, a black businessman from Georgia. After opening in 1913 in Overtown, then a segregated area known as "Colored Town", the Lyric Theater provided a center for entertainment for blacks in Miami. In 1915, The Miami News described the Lyric as, "possibly the most beautiful and costly playhouse owned by Colored people in all the Southland."

The theater was a key element in the community of "Little Broadway," an area whose hotels, restaurants and nightclubs attracted both black and white tourists and residents. The Lyric Theater operated as a movie and vaudeville theater for nearly fifty years. Representing black economic influence and freedom from discrimination, the Theater fueled a sense of pride and culture within Overtown. It helped the area to earn the nickname of "Harlem of the South".

Following Geder Walker's death in 1919, ownership of the Lyric Theater passed to his wife Henrietta. The Lyric continued to operate as a theater and concert venue and as a community auditorium. Schools and civic groups performed there, and held special events such as commencement ceremonies.

Overtown was a popular vacation destination for Black Americans, recommended by The Negro Motorist Green Book. Well-known speakers and performers appeared at the Lyric throughout the 1940s and ’50s, attracting a diverse audience that included Blacks, Latinos, and whites. Those who appeared at the Lyric Theater included W.E.B. DuBoise, Mary McLeod Bethune, Marian Anderson, Bessie Smith, Ethel Waters, and the Fisk Jubilee Singers, among many others.

The Lyric operated as a movie theater until it was acquired by the General Assembly of the Church of the Lord Jesus Christ of the Apostolic Faith in 1959, and was put to use as a church. In the 1960s, the federal, state, and city governments used eminent domain to forcibly acquire buildings in the predominantly black community of Overtown, building a highway and other “urban renewal” projects. Most of the buildings in "Little Broadway" were destroyed. The Lyric Theater escaped destruction, but it remained closed for several decades. By 1974 it was owned by Bishop Walter McCollough and The United House of Prayer For All People.

In 1988, the Lyric Theater was acquired by the Black Archives, History and Research Foundation of South Florida, Inc. In 1989, the Theater was listed in the National Register of Historic Places. The building had suffered considerable damage over the years, including a hole in the roof and fire damage to the interior.

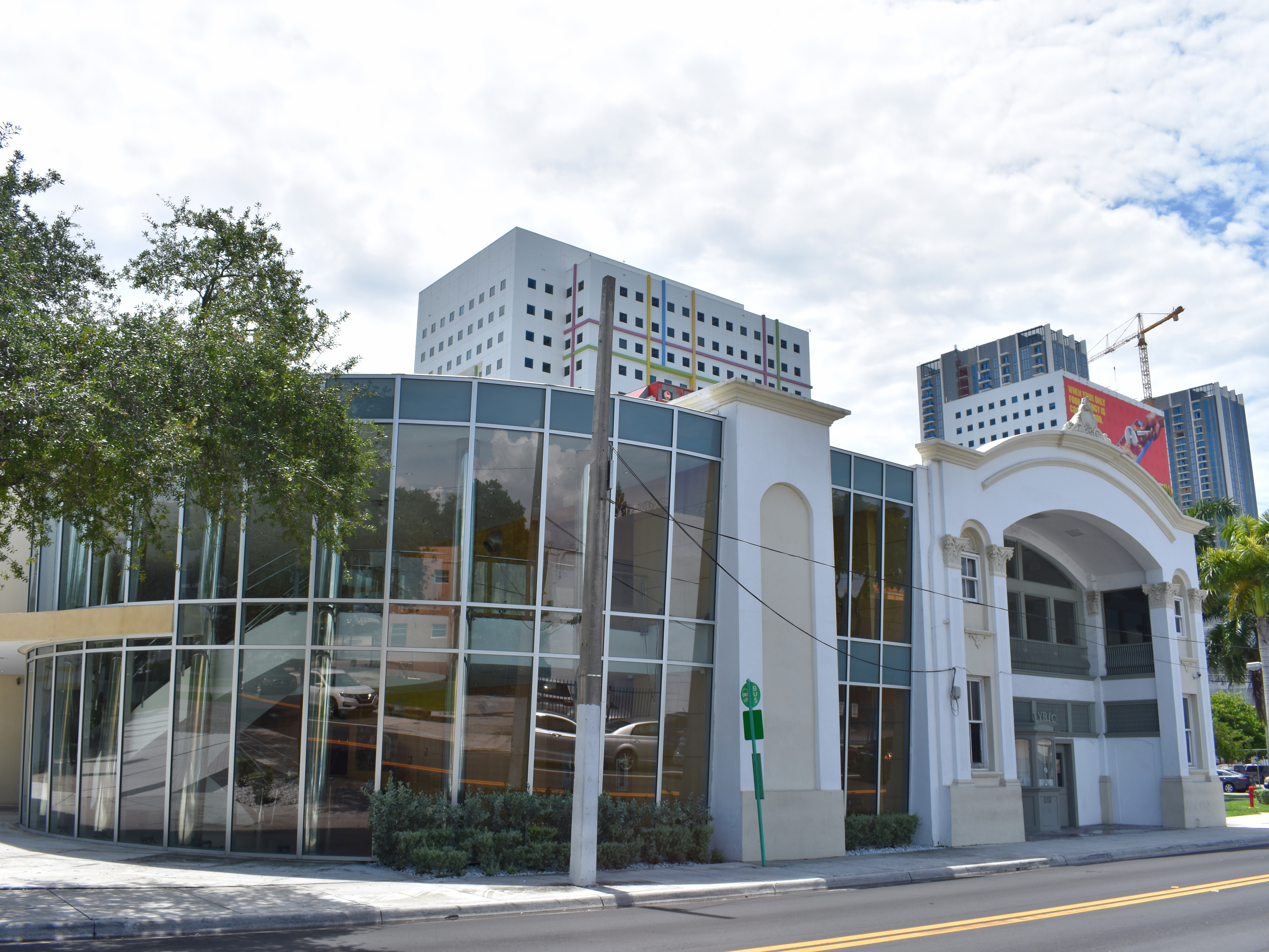
Lyric Theater, 2019

At least four periods of restoration have occurred since 1988. In 2000, following extensive renovation, the Lyric Theater was once again able to open to audiences. A second phase was completed in 2004, involving reconstruction of the lobby, box office, concessions and offices for the theater. Phase 3 involved renovations to the stage and administrative offices, with an official reopening in February 2014. Further renovations occurred in 2020, during the COVID-19 pandemic, when termites were detected and the stage was completely rebuilt. The Lyric Theater is once again a social center, reflective of both black economic influence and cultural pride.

nrM Studio-Lab Projects A.A.P.C. + Overtown (Music and Culture of Overtown) Performance at the Historic Lyric Theater in Overtown (2007)
