= List of Miami-Dade Transit metro stations =

Miami-Dade Transit metro system maps

Metrorail

Metromover

Miami-Dade Transit operates the Metrorail rapid transit system and the Metromover people mover system in Miami and Greater Miami-Dade County, Florida, United States. The network consists of two elevated Metrorail lines (Green Line and Orange Line) and three elevated Metromover lines (Brickell Loop, Inner Loop, and Omni Loop). In the third quarter of 2019, the entire system served 86,600 passengers per weekday, with 59,000 passengers riding the Metrorail and 27,600 riding the Metromover. Miami-Dade Transit operates 42 metro stations, with 23 in the Metrorail system throughout Miami-Dade County and 21 in the Metromover system within Downtown Miami. Brickell and Government Center stations serve both systems, allowing for transfers between Metrorail and Metromover lines.

The initial 21-mile (34 km) Metrorail line opened in three segments. Service began on May 20, 1984, with the opening of the first 11-mile (18 km) segment, featuring 10 stations from Dadeland South station in Kendall to Historic Overtown/Lyric Theatre station in the Overtown neighborhood of Miami. On December 17, 1984, the second segment opened, expanding service to the northwest with the opening of five stations through Earlington Heights station. The third segment opened on May 19, 1985, providing service past Earlington Heights station, with an additional five stations opened through Okeechobee station in Hialeah.

Since the opening of the initial line, one infill station and two extensions have been added to the Metrorail. Tri-Rail station was opened in 1989, providing a connection to the Tri-Rail commuter rail service. The line was extended 1.4 miles (2.3 km) in 2003, with a new northern terminus at Palmetto station in Hialeah. The 2.4-mile (3.9 km) AirportLink branch and Miami International Airport (MIA) station opened in 2012, and became the second station to connect with Tri-Rail. The branch split the Metrorail system into two lines: the existing service from Palmetto to Dadeland South was designated as the Green Line, and the new service from MIA to Dadeland South was designated as the Orange Line.

Metromover service began on April 17, 1986, with the opening of the initial 1.9-mile (3.1 km) loop through the Miami Central Business District. On May 26, 1994, service expanded with the opening of the 1.4-mile (2.3 km) Omni Loop and 1.1-mile (1.8 km) Brickell Loop branches into the Arts & Entertainment District and Brickell districts, respectively. Bicentennial Park station on the Omni Loop closed in 1996 due to low ridership; it was renovated and reopened in 2013 as Museum Park station. MiamiCentral station opened in 2018, serving Brightline inter-city rail service; the station connects with Metrorail and Metromover via Historic Overtown/Lyric Theatre station and Wilkie D. Ferguson Jr. station, respectively.

== Metrorail stations ==
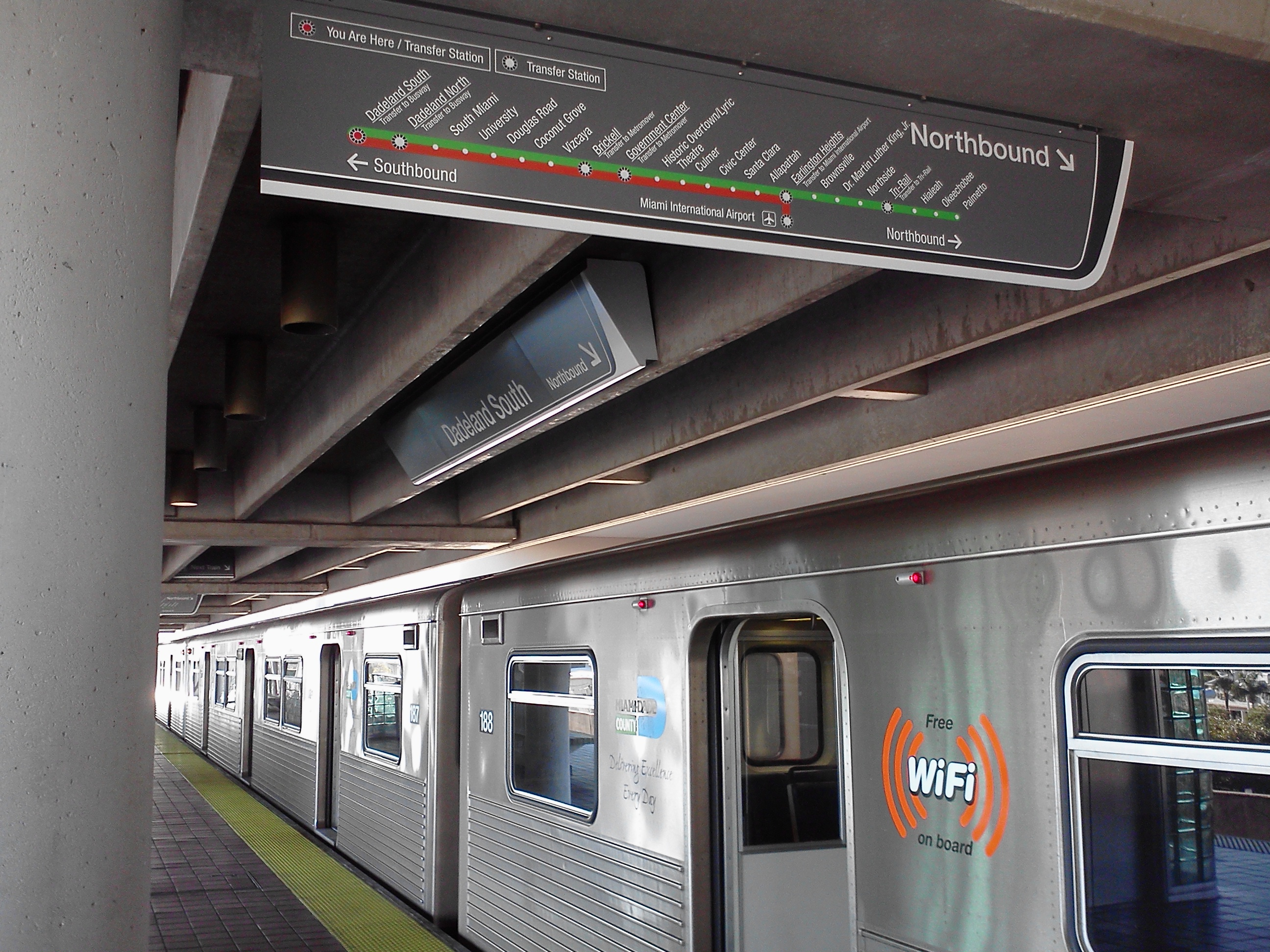
Dadeland South station is one of 23 Metrorail stations, and serves as the southern terminus for both Metrorail lines.

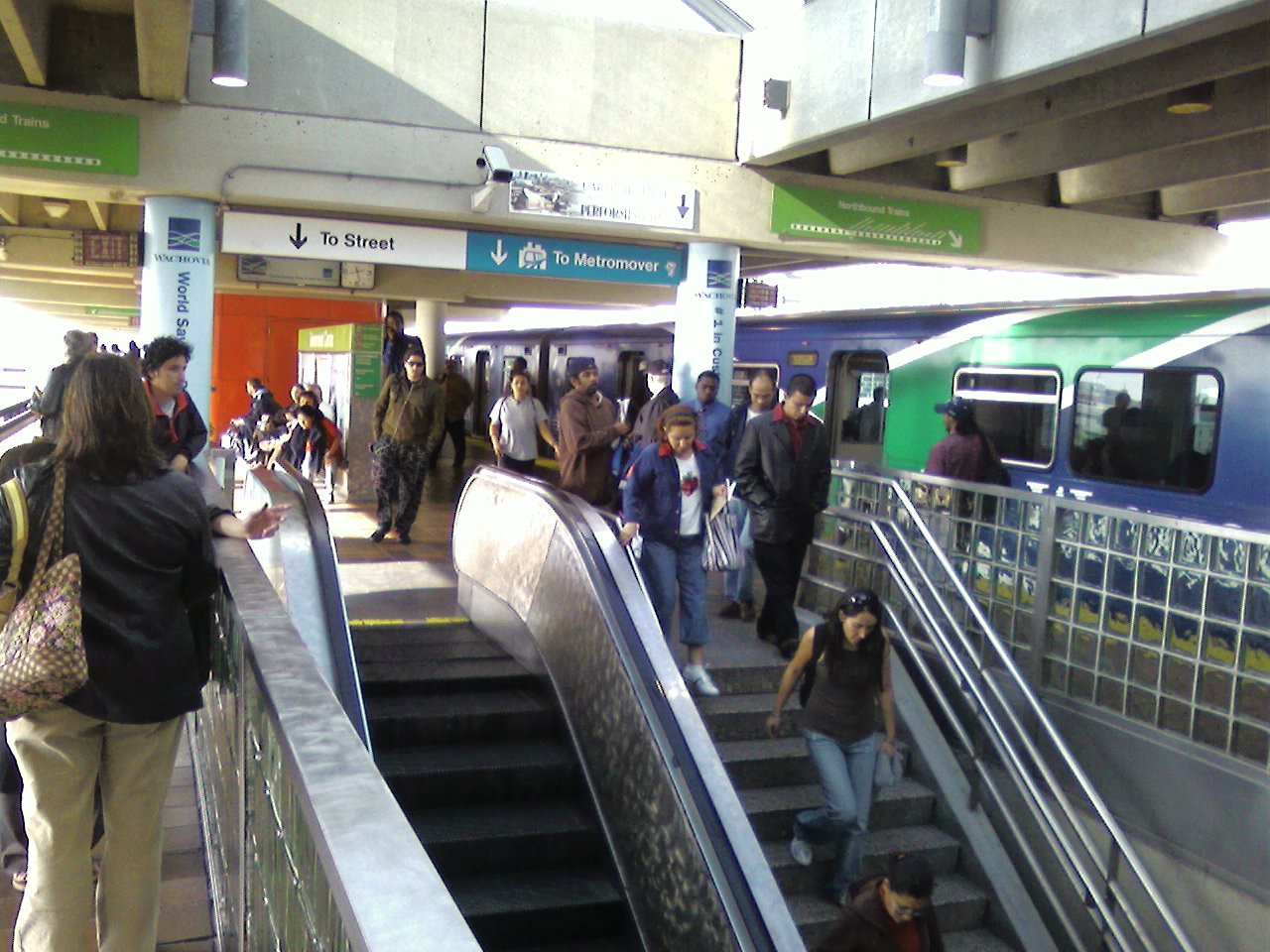
Government Center station, located in Downtown Miami, is the busiest Metrorail station, serving over 10,000 riders on an average weekday.

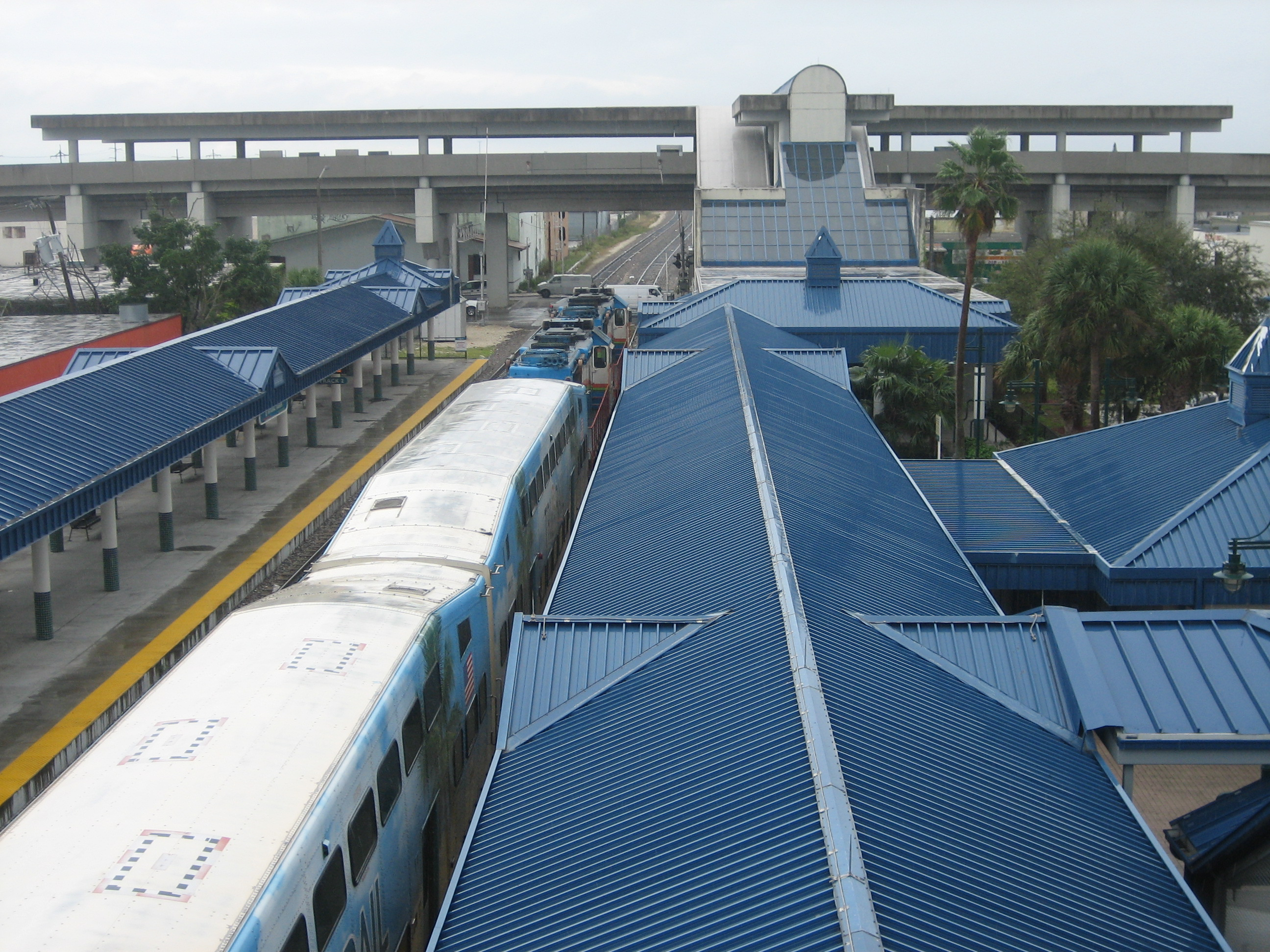
Tri-Rail station in Hialeah features a connection to the Tri-Rail commuter train.

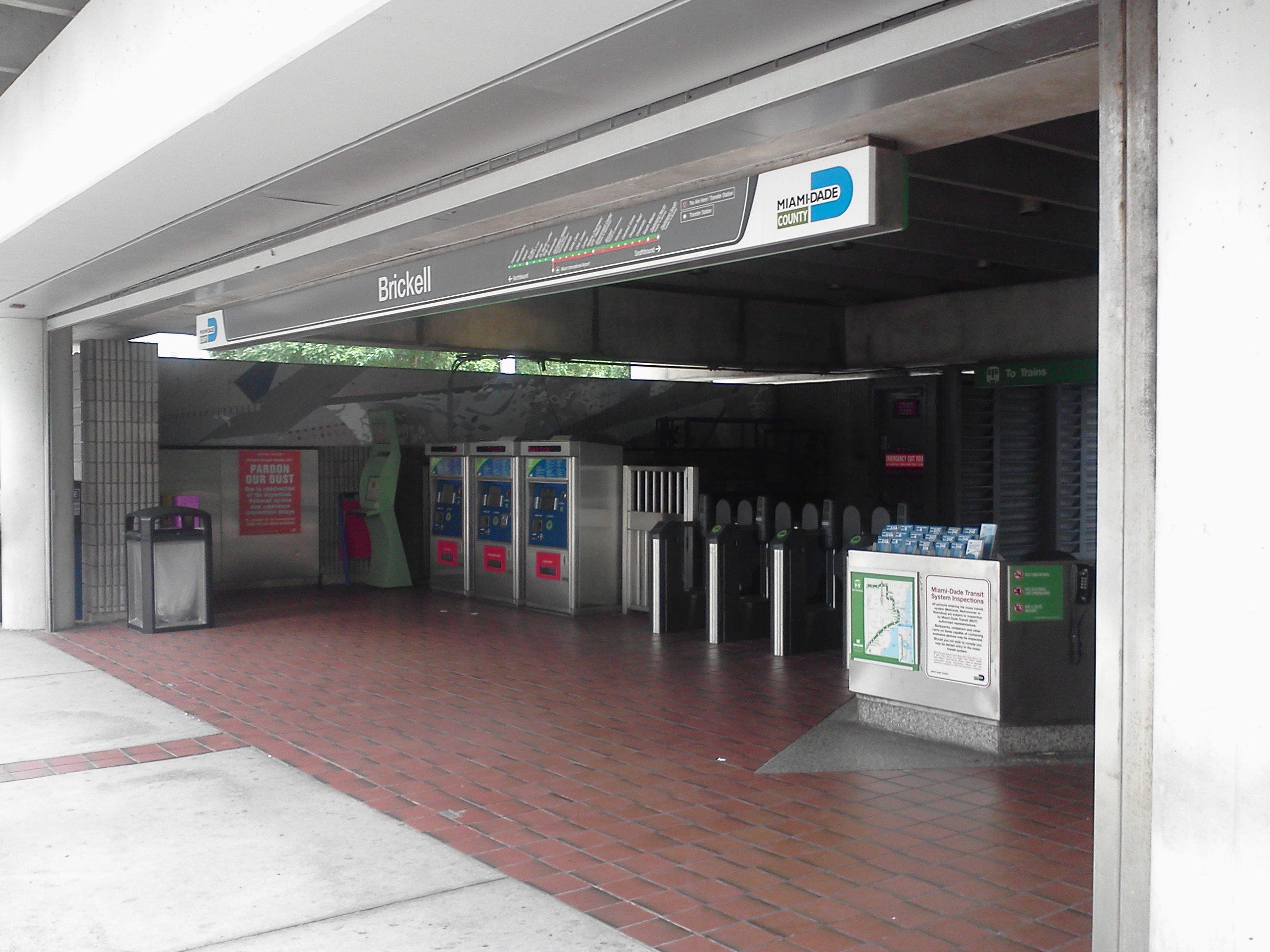
Brickell station is the fourth-busiest Metrorail station, located in the Brickell neighborhood of Miami.

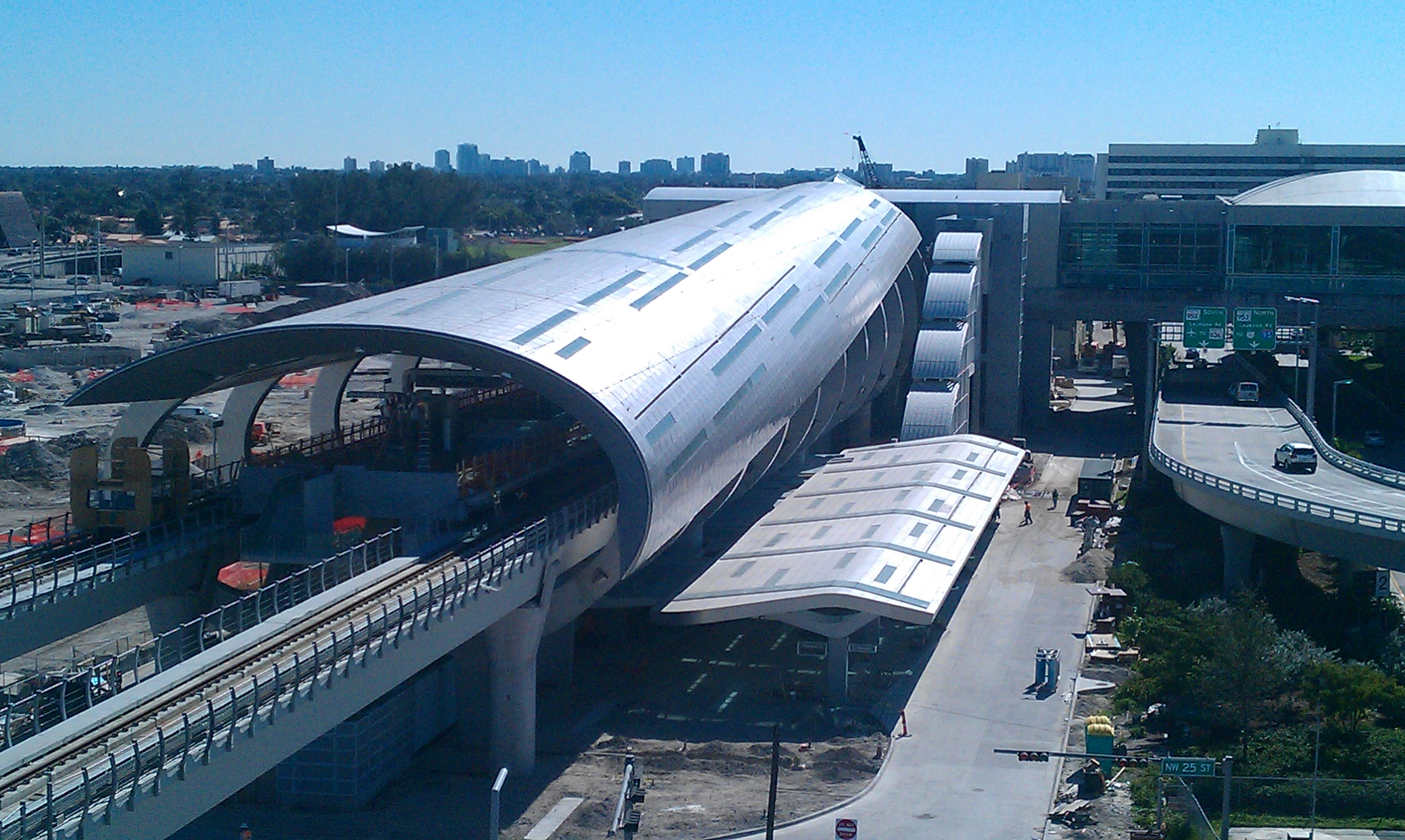
Miami Intermodal Center, which opened in 2012, is the newest station in the Metrorail system.

Key
†	Terminal station
‡	Transfer station with Metromover

List of Metrorail stations
Station	Lines	Location	Opened	Average weekday ridership (Nov. 2019)
Allapattah	Green Line Orange Line	Miami (Allapattah)	December 17, 1984	1,885
Brickell‡	Green Line Orange Line	Miami (Brickell)	May 20, 1984	6,232 (Note: Data includes station ridership for Metrorail only)
Brownsville	Green Line	Brownsville	May 19, 1985	839
Coconut Grove	Green Line Orange Line	Miami (Coral Way)	May 20, 1984	1,701
Culmer	Green Line Orange Line	Miami (Overtown)	December 17, 1984	1,321
Dadeland North	Green Line Orange Line	Glenvar Heights (Dadeland)	May 20, 1984	5,832
Dadeland South†	Green Line Orange Line	Kendall (Dadeland)	May 20, 1984	7,120
Douglas Road	Green Line Orange Line	Miami (Coral Way)	May 20, 1984	3,555
Dr. Martin Luther King Jr. Plaza	Green Line	Gladeview	May 19, 1985	1,162
Earlington Heights	Green Line Orange Line	Brownsville	December 17, 1984	1,582
Government Center‡	Green Line Orange Line	Miami (Central Business District)	May 20, 1984	10,067
Hialeah	Green Line	Hialeah	May 19, 1985	1,286
Historic Overtown/Lyric Theatre	Green Line Orange Line	Miami (Overtown)	May 20, 1984	2,166
Miami International Airport†	Orange Line	Miami-Dade County	July 28, 2012	1,692
Northside	Green Line	Gladeview	May 19, 1985	1,367
Okeechobee	Green Line	Hialeah	May 19, 1985	1,137
Palmetto†	Green Line	Medley	May 23, 2003	1,358
Santa Clara	Green Line Orange Line	Miami (Allapattah)	December 17, 1984	778
South Miami	Green Line Orange Line	South Miami	May 20, 1984	2,914
Tri-Rail	Green Line	Hialeah	March 6, 1989	1,139
UHealth–Jackson	Green Line Orange Line	Miami (Allapattah)	December 17, 1984	5,926
University	Green Line Orange Line	Coral Gables	May 20, 1984	2,595
Vizcaya	Green Line Orange Line	Miami (Little Havana)	May 20, 1984	1,321

== Metromover stations ==
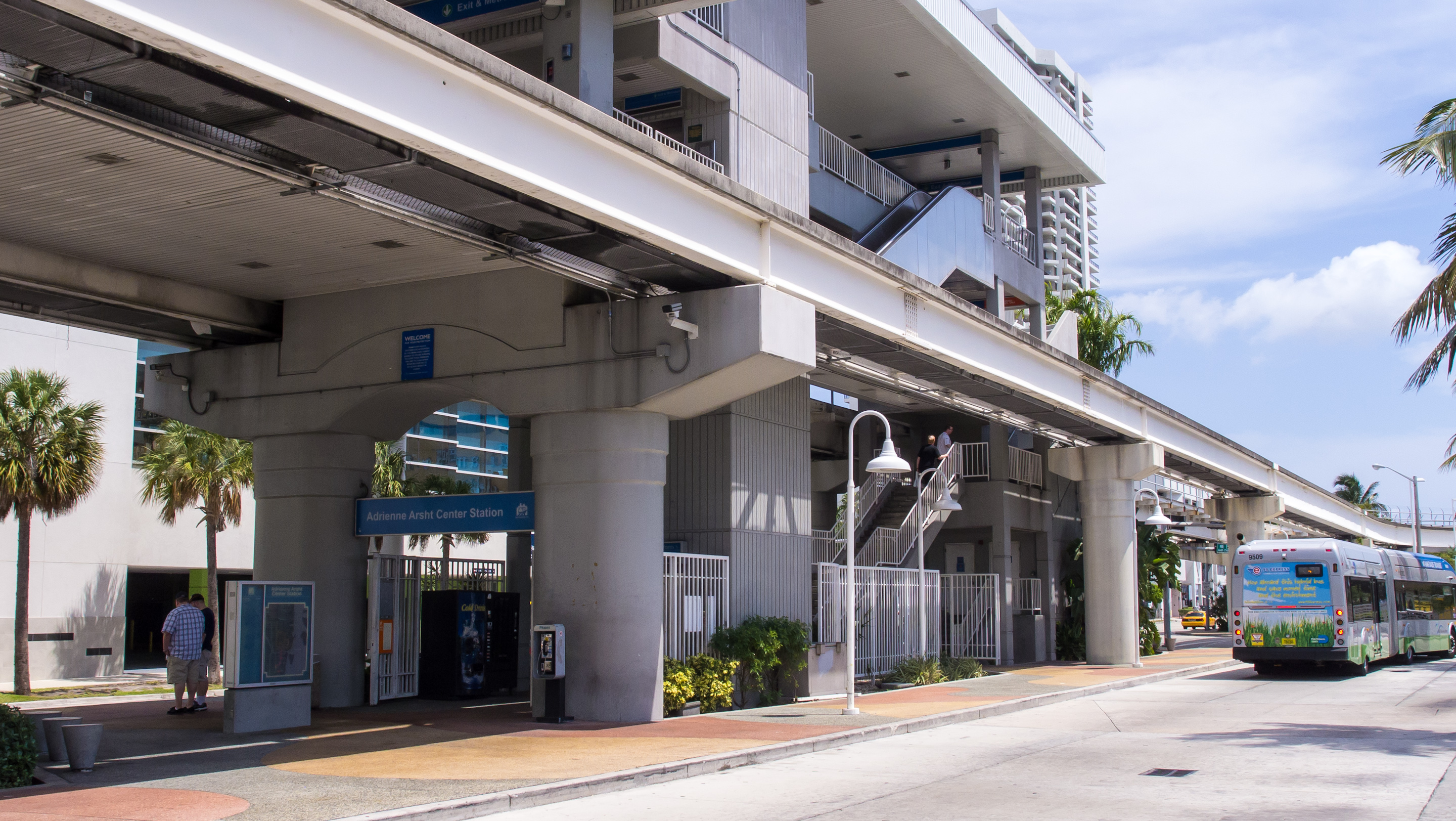
Adrienne Arsht Center station on the Omni Loop is one of four stations in the Arts & Entertainment District neighborhood of Miami.

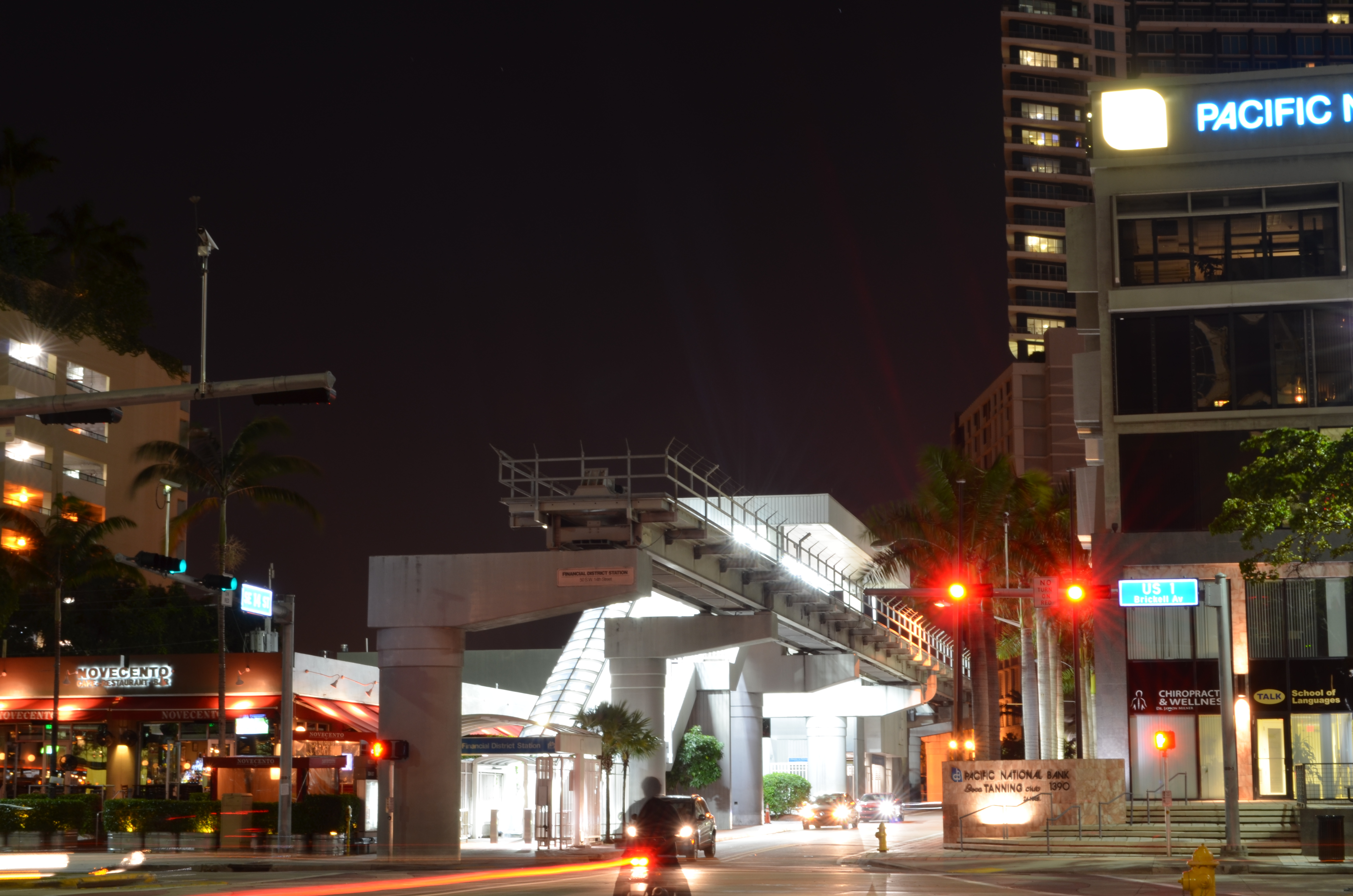
Financial District station is the southernmost station on the Brickell Loop.

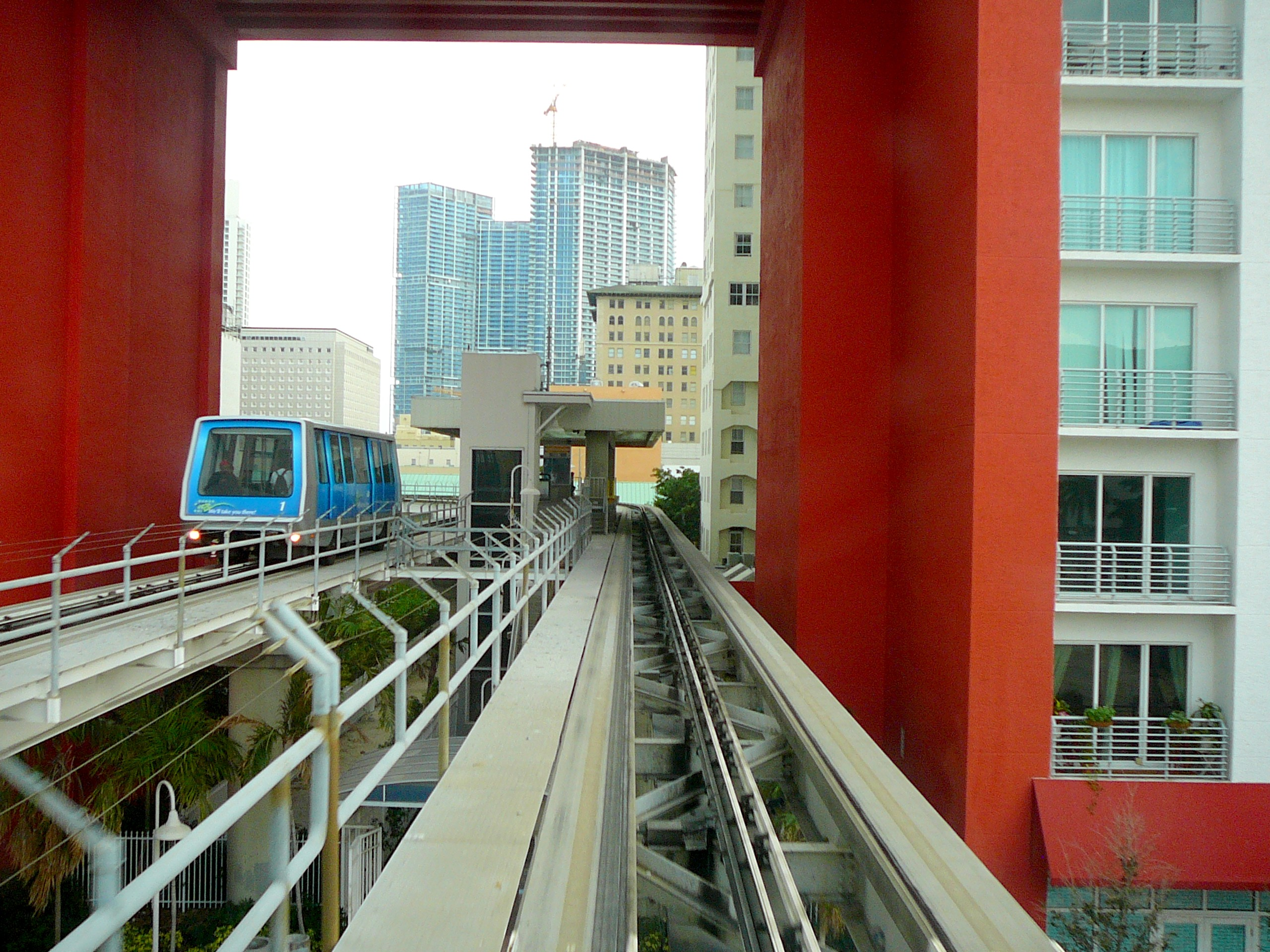
The Metromover passes through The Loft 2 residential tower, adjacent to First Street station.

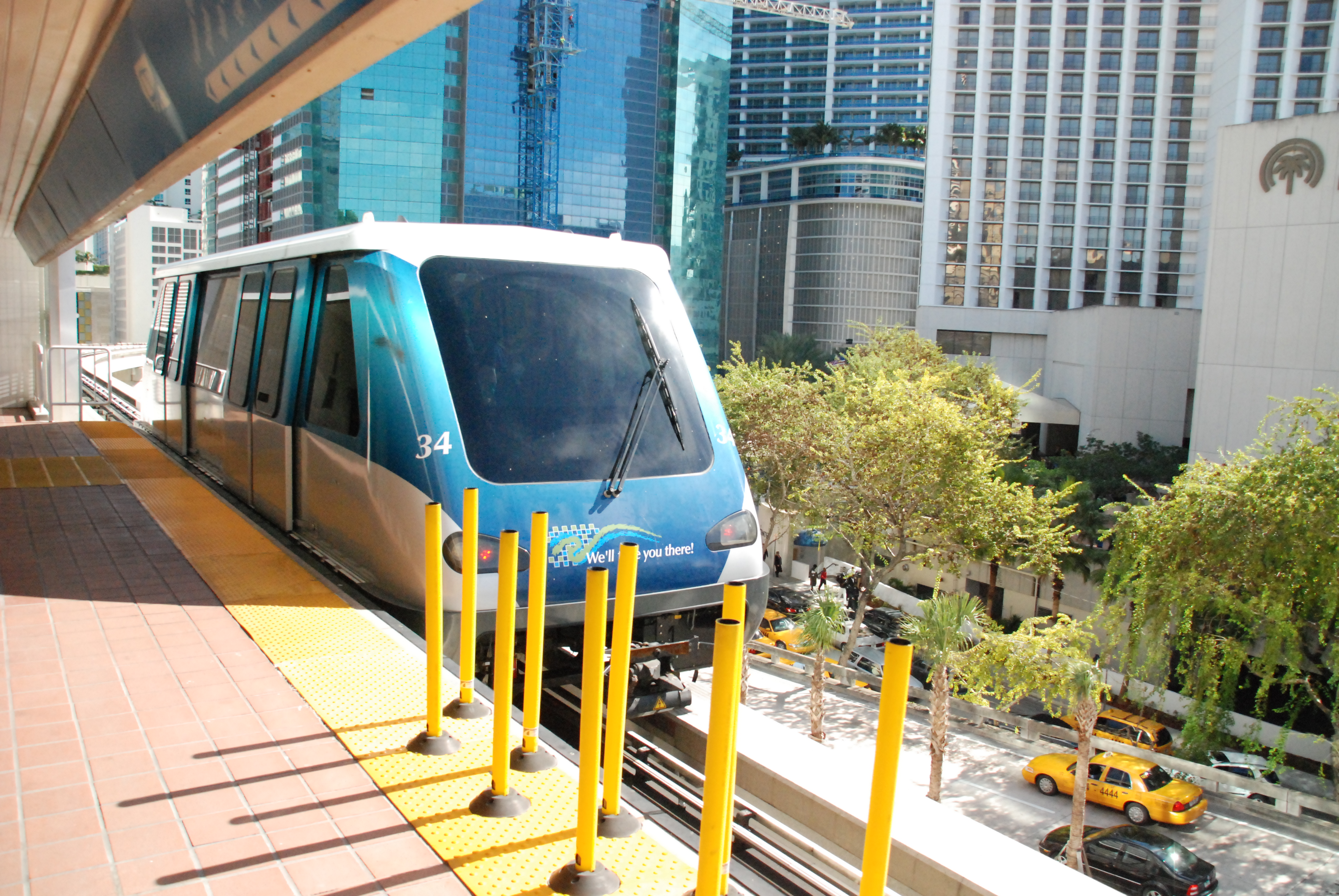
Knight Center station serves all three Metromover lines in the Central Business District.

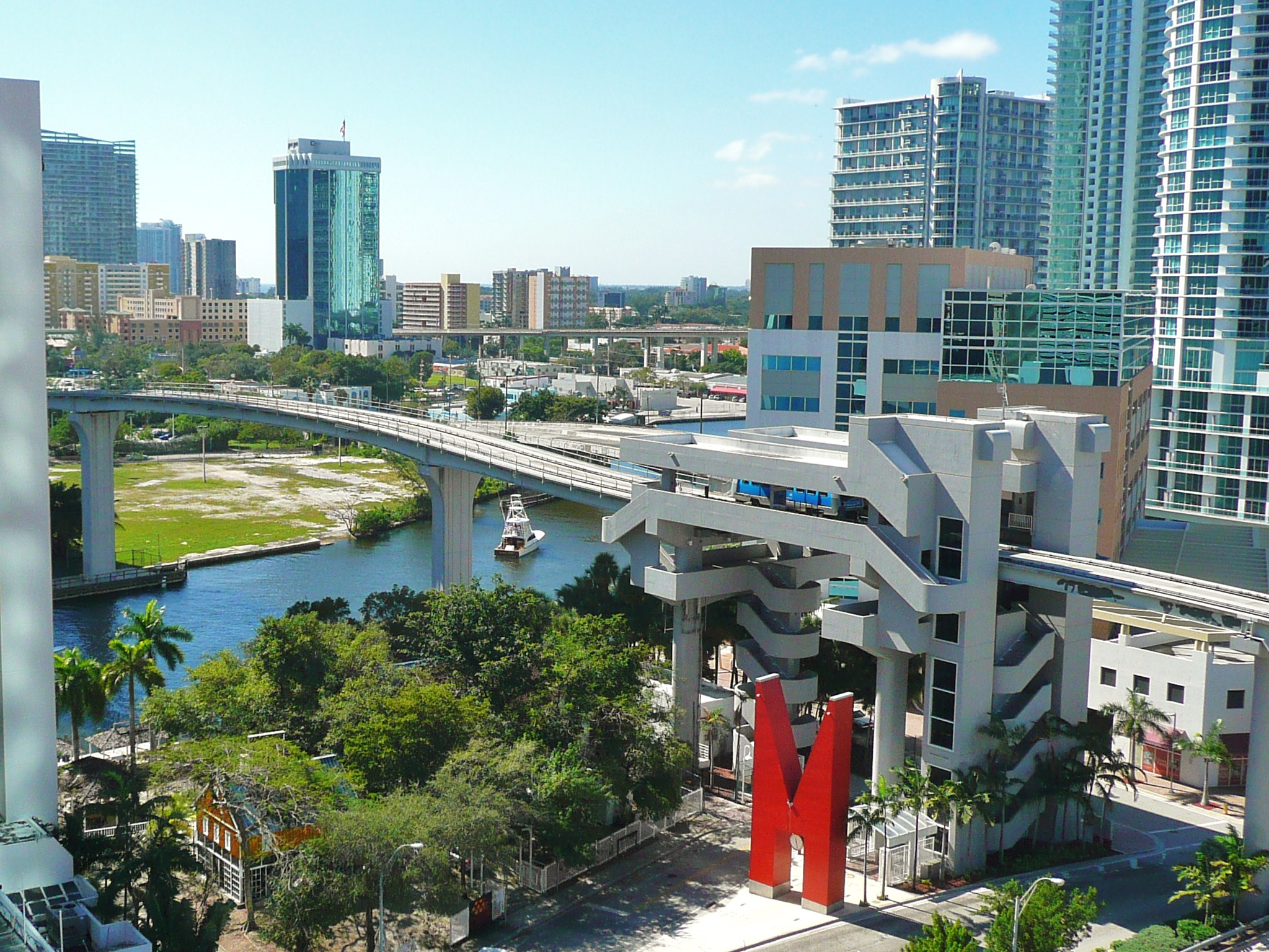
Riverwalk station is located on the Brickell Loop on the south side of the Miami River.

Key
‡	Transfer station with Metrorail

List of Metromover stations
Station	Lines	Location	Opened	Average weekday ridership (Nov. 2019)
Adrienne Arsht Center	Omni Loop	Miami (Arts & Entertainment District)	May 26, 1994	1,953
Bayfront Park	Inner Loop Brickell Loop Omni Loop	Miami (Central Business District)	April 17, 1986	3,069
Brickell‡	Brickell Loop	Miami (Brickell)	May 26, 1994	4,121 (Note: Data includes station ridership for Metromover only)
Brickell City Centre	Brickell Loop	Miami (Brickell)	May 26, 1994	2,164
College Bayside	Inner Loop Brickell Loop Omni Loop	Miami (Central Business District)	April 17, 1986	2,333
College North	Inner Loop Brickell Loop Omni Loop	Miami (Central Business District)	April 17, 1986	1,058
Eleventh Street	Omni Loop	Miami (Arts & Entertainment District)	May 26, 1994	259
Fifth Street	Brickell Loop	Miami (Brickell)	May 26, 1994	553
Financial District	Brickell Loop	Miami (Brickell)	May 26, 1994	1,492
First Street	Inner Loop Brickell Loop Omni Loop	Miami (Central Business District)	April 17, 1986	1,687
Freedom Tower	Omni Loop	Miami (Central Business District)	May 26, 1994	507
Government Center‡	Inner Loop Brickell Loop Omni Loop	Miami (Central Business District)	April 17, 1986	7,714
Knight Center	Inner Loop Brickell Loop Omni Loop	Miami (Central Business District)	April 17, 1986	1,094
Miami Avenue	Inner Loop	Miami (Central Business District)	April 17, 1986	469
Museum Park	Omni Loop	Miami (Arts & Entertainment District)	December 2, 2013 (Note: Originally opened as Bicentennial Park station on May 26, 1994, and closed in 1996)	174
Park West	Omni Loop	Miami (Central Business District)	May 26, 1994	338
Riverwalk	Brickell Loop	Miami (Central Business District)	May 26, 1994	847
School Board	Omni Loop	Miami (Arts & Entertainment District)	May 26, 1994	861
Tenth Street Promenade	Brickell Loop	Miami (Brickell)	May 26, 1994	756
Third Street	Brickell Loop Omni Loop	Miami (Central Business District)	April 17, 1986	368
Wilkie D. Ferguson Jr.	Inner Loop Brickell Loop Omni Loop	Miami (Central Business District)	April 17, 1986	568

== See also ==
- List of Metrobus routes (Miami-Dade County)
