= List of Metrobus routes in Miami-Dade County =

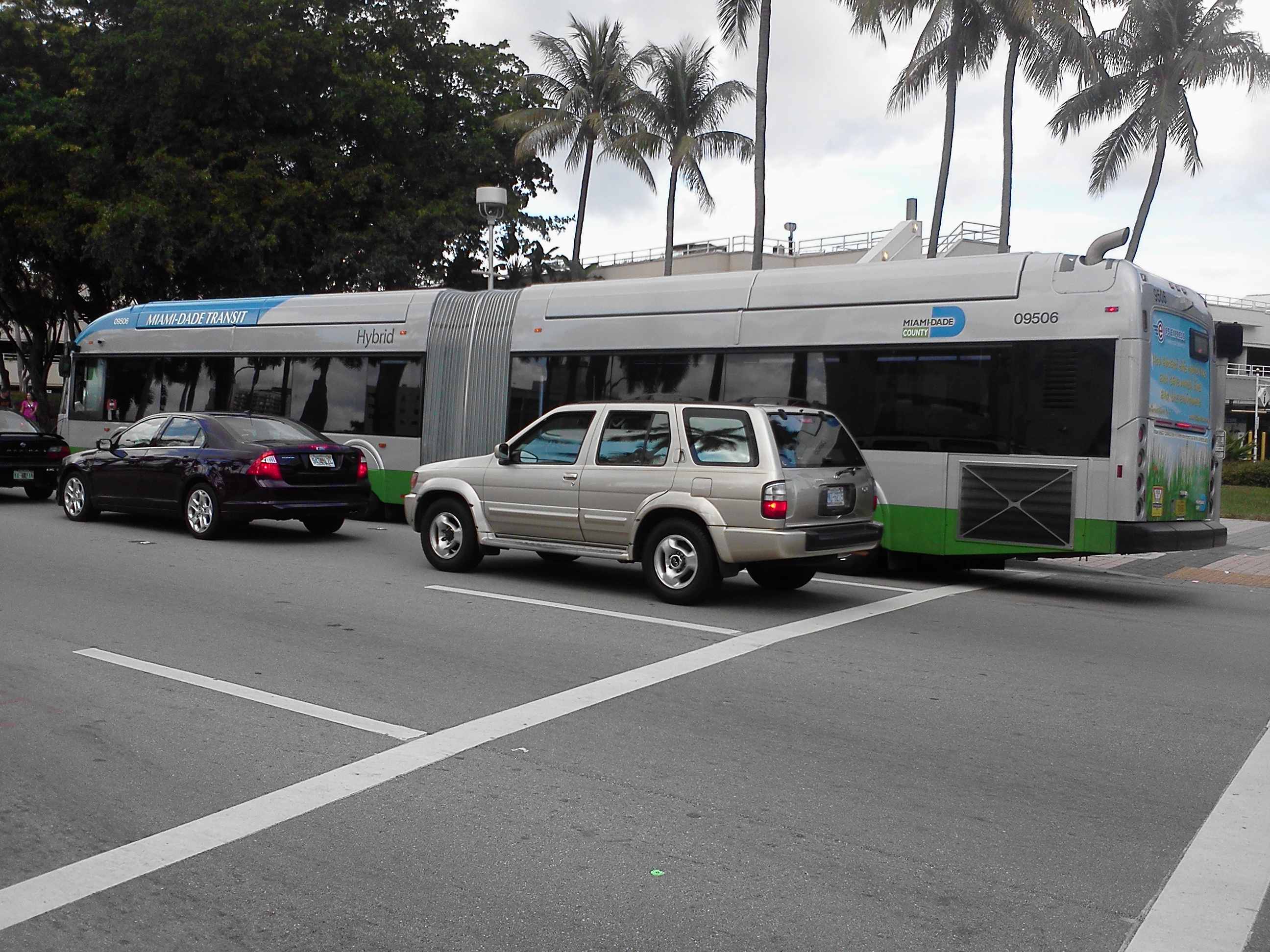
Route 100 from Downtown Miami to Aventura Mall via A1A in Miami Beach, the busiest route, which uses many large buses such as this hybrid articulated bus

Over 70 Metrobus routes are operated by Miami-Dade Transit with some routes contracted by LSF, serving Miami-Dade County, Florida and connecting with several routes in adjacent counties. Routes are identified by numbers only; however, others, specifically Express, MAX, and Shuttle routes, also have formal names/numbers. Routes that are labeled as "Connections" are regular service routes introduced during the 2000s that, for the most part, are either primarily or were formerly operated by minibuses. Routes labeled as MAX, short for Metro Area Express, are limited stop services. Some routes have branches that carry an "A" or "B" suffix, while the "X" suffix denotes an express route, although for the 95X, this exists only in print. The West Kendall area buses do not use "X" either and instead are labeled as MAX, which only includes Route 204, Route 272, and Route 288.

As of November 13, 2023 with the introduction of the Better Bus Plan, many routes were discontinued, letter/number changed and extended to new places.

== Routes ==
Route information effective as of January 27, 2026.

Route	Terminals			Major streets traveled	Service notes
2	Downtown Miami Southwest 1st Street and Southwest 1st Avenue	↔	El Portal Northeast 84th Street and Northeast 2nd Avenue	Northwest 2nd Avenue	
3	Downtown Miami Downtown Metrobus Terminal	↔	Aventura Aventura Mall Metrobus Terminal	Biscayne Boulevard	24 hour service
7	Downtown Miami Northeast 1st Avenue and Northeast 4th Street (Miami-Dade College Wolfson Campus)	↔	Sweetwater Dolphin Mall	Northwest 7th Street, Fontainebleau Boulevard	
7A	Downtown Miami Northeast 1st Avenue and Northeast 4th Street (Miami-Dade College Wolfson Campus)	Peak ↔	Miami International Airport Miami Intermodal Center	Northwest 7th Street, Northwest 42nd Avenue	Operates during weekday rush hours only
8	Brickell Brickell station	↔	Miami-Dade County Southwest 26th Street and 152nd Avenue	Southwest 8th Street, Coral Way/Southwest 26th Street	Additional weekday rush hour trips short-turn/originate at Southwest 8th Street and 82nd Avenue; Weekend trips short-turn/originate at FIU Madique Campus Metrobus Terminal
9	Downtown Miami Southwest 1st Avenue and Southwest 1st Street	↔	Aventura Aventura Mall Metrobus Terminal	Northeast 2nd Avenue, Northeast 12th Avenue, Northeast 10th Avenue, Miami Gardens Drive	Trips alternate between two different routings between 123rd Street and Northeast 185th Street
9A	Downtown Miami Southwest 1st Avenue and Southwest 1st Street	↔	Aventura Aventura Mall Metrobus Terminal	Northeast 2nd Avenue, Northeast 6th Avenue, Biscayne Boulevard	Trips alternate between two different routings between 123rd Street and Northeast 185th Street
11	Downtown Miami Northwest 1st Street and Northwest 1st Avenue	↔	University Park FIU Madique Campus Metrobus Terminal	West Flagler Street	24 hour service
12	Coconut Grove Mercy Hospital	↔	Gladeview Northside station	South Miami Avenue, 12th Avenue, 71st Street, Northwest 79th Street	
14	Arts & Entertainment District Adrienne Arsht Center station	↔	Miami Beach Mount Sinai Medical Center	MacArthur Causeway, Washington Avenue, Collins Avenue, 41st Street	
15	Arts & Entertainment District Adrienne Arsht Center station	↔	South Beach Dade Boulevard and 23rd Street	Venetian Causeway	
16	Upper Eastside Northeast 5th Avenue and Northeast 81st Street	↔	North Miami Beach The Mall at 163rd Street Metrobus Terminal	Biscayne Boulevard, Northeast 6th Avenue, Northeast 125th Street, Northeast 16th Avenue	Weekdays only
17	The Roads Vizcaya station	↔	North Miami Beach Northeast 167th Street and Northeast 15th Avenue	17th Avenue, Northwest 22nd Avenue, Northwest 183rd Street	
20	Miami International Airport Miami Intermodal Center	↔	South Beach Washington Avenue and 17th Street	17th Street, Alton Road, MacArthur Causeway, Northwest 20th Street, Northwest 36th Street	
21	Downtown Miami Downtown Metrobus Terminal	↔	Gladeview Northside station	Northwest 3rd Avenue, Northwest 12th Avenue, 71st Street, Northwest 79th Street	
22	Cocount Grove Coconut Grove station	↔	Westview Miami Dade College North Campus	Northwest 22nd Avenue	
24 Coral Way Limited	Brickell Brickell station	↔	University Park FIU Madique Campus Metrobus Terminal	Southwest 3rd Avenue, Coral Way	Makes limited stops between Ponce de Leon and Brickell
25	Westview Miami Dade College North Campus	↔	North Miami Northeast 12th Avenue and Northeast 137th Street	Northeast 12th Avenue, 125th Street, Northwest 119th Street	Weekdays only
26	Brickell Brickell station	↔	Key Biscayne Crandon Boulevard and Arthur Lamb Junior Road	Brickell Avenue, Rickenbacker Causeway, Crandon Boulevard	
27	Cocount Grove Coconut Grove station	↔	Miami Gardens Northwest 207th Street and Northwest 27th Avenue	27th Avenue	Alternating trips run via 27th Avenue (27) or Northwest 37th Avenue (27A) between 183rd Street and 207th Street
27A	Cocount Grove Coconut Grove station	↔	Miami Gardens Northwest 207th Street and Northwest 27th Avenue	27th Avenue, Northwest 37th Avenue	Alternating trips run via 27th Avenue (27) or Northwest 37th Avenue (27A) between 183rd Street and 207th Street
32	Arts & Entertainment District Adrienne Arsht Center station	↔	Miami Gardens Northwest 47th Avenue and 199th Street	Northwest 20th Street, Northwest 32nd Avenue, Northwest 47th Avenue	
35	Cutler Bay Southwest 112th Avenue and Southwest 211th Street	↔	Florida City Southwest 344th Street Park and Ride	Southwest 112th Avenue, Moody Drive, Campbell Drive, Northwest 6th Avenue	
36	Downtown Doral Northwest 53rd Street and Northwest 84th Avenue	↔	South Beach Washington Avenue and Lincoln Road	Northwest 36th Street, Julia Tuttle Causeway, Collins Avenue	Alternating trips run to Doral (36) or Miami Intermodal Center (36A)
36A	Miami International Airport Miami Intermodal Center	↔	South Beach Washington Avenue and Lincoln Road	Northwest 36th Street, Julia Tuttle Causeway, Collins Avenue	Alternating trips run to Doral (36) or Miami Intermodal Center (36A)
37	South Miami South Miami station	↔	Miami Lakes Northwest 176th Street and Northwest 58th Avenue	Sunset Drive, Douglas Road, Palm Avenue, Northwest 57th Avenue	Alternating morning, midday, and evening trips run between Douglas Road station and Miami Intermodal Center
40	Coral Gables Douglas Road station	↔	Kendall West Southwest 152nd Avenue and Southwest 42nd Street	Ponce de Leon/Ruiz Avenue, Bird Road	
42	Coral Gables Douglas Road station	↔	Opa-locka Opa-locka station	Lejeune Road	
52	Miami-Dade County Community Health of South Florida, Inc. - Doris Ison Health Center	↔	Palmetto Estates, Palmetto Bay TransitWay and 152nd Street (Coral Reef Drive station)	Old Cutler Road, 200th Street, 117th Avenue, 184th Street, Lincoln Boulevard, 152nd Street	Alternating trips short-turn at Caribbean Boulevard station
54	Upper East Side Northeast 61st Street and Northeast 4th Court	↔	Miami Lakes Northwest 186th Street and #8505	Northwest 54th Street, 21st Street, West 68th Street, Commerce Way, Miami Gardens Drive	Weekday trips alternate between Miami Lakes (54) and Hialeah Gardens (54A); All weekend trips run to Hialeah Gardens (54A)
54A	Upper East Side Northeast 61st Street and Northeast 4th Court	↔	Hialeah Gardens Northwest 87th Court and 114th Street	Northwest 54th Street, 21st Street, West 60th Street	Weekday trips alternate between Miami Lakes (54) and Hialeah Gardens (54A); All weekend trips run to Hialeah Gardens (54A)
56	Kendall West Southwest 56th Street and Southwest 152nd Avenue	↺	University of Miami University station	Counterclockwise Loop: Miller Road, San Amaro Drive, Ponce de Leon, Campo Sano Avenue, San Amaro Drive, Miller Road	No Sunday service
57	Miami International Airport Miami Intermodal Center	↔	University of Miami University station	Blue Road, Lejeune Road, 57th Avenue, Perimeter Road	No Sunday service
62	Hialeah West 3rd Street and Palm Avenue	↔	Upper East Side Northeast 61st Street and Biscayne Boulevard	62nd Street	Alternating westbound trips short-turn and eastbound trips originate at Dr. Martin Luther King Jr. Plaza station
70	Florida City Southwest 344th Street Park and Ride	↔	Cutler Bay Southwest 112th Avenue and Southwest 211th Street	Southwest 112th Avenue, US-1, Southwest 187th Avenue	
72	West Kendall West Kendall Transit Terminal	↔	South Miami South Miami station	Sunset Drive	
73	Palmetto Estates, Palmetto Bay Southwest 92nd Avenue and 152nd Street	Peak ↔	Hialeah Okeechobee station	Milam Diary Road, Southwest 67th Avenue	
73	Dadeland Dadeland North station	Off-Peak ↔	Hialeah Okeechobee station	Milam Diary Road, Southwest 67th Avenue, Southwest 57th Avenue, Southwest 77th Avenue	
75	Miami Lakes Miami Lakes Education Center	↔	Sunny Isles Beach Government Center	Northwest 57th Avenue, Northwest 173rd Drive, Northwest 175th Street, 167th Street, 163rd Street, Collins Avenue	Weekend service short-turns at Northwest 176th Street and Northwest 58th Avenue
75A	Miami Gardens Golden Glades station	↔	Biscayne Bay FIU Biscane Bay Campus	167th Street, Biscayne Boulevard, Northeast 151st Street	
77	Downtown Miami Government Center	↔	Miami Gardens Northwest 7th Avenue and Northwest 183rd Street	Northwest 7th Avenue	Trips alternate between running clockwise or counterclockwise in the following loop: 183rd Street, 7th Avenue, Northwest 199th Street, Northwest 2nd Avenue
79	Hialeah Hialeah station	↔	Miami Beach Washington Avenue and 17th Street	East 25th Street, Northwest 79th Street, Normandy Drive, Collins Avenue	24-hour service; Overnight service short-turns/originates at Northside station
87	Dadeland Dadeland North station	↔	Medley Palmetto station	87th Avenue	
88	West Kendall West Kendall Transit Terminal	↔	Dadeland Dadeland North station	Kendall Drive	
95 Express Golden Gables	Miami Gardens Golden Glades station	Peak →	Downtown Miami Southeast 1st Street and 1st Avenue	I-95, 1st Avenue, 1st Street	Express service; Buses run a clockwise loop in Downtown Miami; Select southbound AM trips run from and select northbound PM trips run to Northwest 87th Avenue and 36th Street in Carol City, running via Miami Gardens Drive; AM northbound trips originate at Southeast 1st Street and 1st Avenue; PM southbound trips terminate at Northwest 8th Street and 1st Court
95 Express Golden Gables	Miami Gardens Golden Glades station	Peak ←	Downtown Miami Northwest 8th Street and 1st Court	I-95, 1st Avenue, 1st Street	Express service; Buses run a clockwise loop in Downtown Miami; Select southbound AM trips run from and select northbound PM trips run to Northwest 87th Avenue and 36th Street in Carol City, running via Miami Gardens Drive; AM northbound trips originate at Southeast 1st Street and 1st Avenue; PM southbound trips terminate at Northwest 8th Street and 1st Court
95A Express Golden Gables	Miami Gardens Golden Glades station	AM Rush ↔ PM Rush ←	Civic Center Northwest 16th Street and 12th Avenue	I-95, FL-112, Northwest 12th Avenue	Express service; Select southbound AM trips run from and select northbound PM trips run to Aventura Mall Metrobus Terminal, running via Miami Gardens Drive
95B Express Golden Gables	Miami Gardens Golden Glades station	AM Rush → PM Rush ←	Doral Northwest 87th Avenue and Northwest 36th Street	I-95, FL-112, Northwest 36th Street	Express service; 1 AM southbound trip and 1 PM northbound trip
97	West Perrine Richmond Drive station	↔	South Miami Heights Southwest 114th Avenue and Quail Roost Drive	US-1, Southwest 97th Avenue, Caribbean Boulevard, Southwest 211th Street	
100	Aventura Aventura Mall Metrobus Terminal	↔	Downtown Miami Northwest 1st Street and Northwest 1st Avenue	Collins Avenue, Washington Avenue, MacArthur Causeway, Biscayne Boulevard	24-hour service; Limited-stop service on Washington Avenue between 5th Street and Lincoln Road
101	Miami Beach Alton Road and 39th Street (Mount Sinai Medical Center)	↔	Downtown Miami Northwest 1st Street and Northwest 1st Avenue	Alton Road, MacArthur Causeway, Biscayne Boulevard	Weekdays only
103	Upper East Side Northeast 5th Avenue and Northeast 81st Street	↔	Hialeah Gardens Northwest 87th Avenue and 103rd Street	Biscayne Boulevard, Northeast 96th Street, 95th Street, 49th Street, 103rd Street	
104	Dadeland Dadeland North station	↔	West Kendall West Kendall Transit Terminal	Southwest 88th Street, Southwest 104th Street, Southwest 167th Avenue	Trips alternate between two routings
104A	Dadeland Dadeland North station	↔	West Kendall West Kendall Transit Terminal	Southwest 88th Street, Southwest 97th Avenue, Southwest 112th Street, Southwest 112th Avenue, Southwest 104th Street, Southwest 96th Street	Trips alternate between two routings
107	Sweetwater Dolphin Mall Metrobus Terminal	↔	Cutler Bay South Dade Government Center	107th Avenue	
125	Surfside Harding Avenue and 94th Street	↔	Westview Miami Dade College North Campus	96th Street, Broad Causeway, Northeast 123rd Street, Northeast 125th Street, 119th Street, Northwest 27th Avenue	
132 Tri-Rail Doral Shuttle	Hialeah Hialeah Market station	Peak ↔	Doral Northwest 53rd Street and Northwest 79th Avenue	Southeast 12th Street, Northwest 36th Street	In Doral, runs a clockwise loop in the morning and a counterclockwise loop in the afternoon/evening
135	Biscayne Bay FIU Biscane Bay Campus	↔	Opa-locka Opa-locka station	Northeast 151st Street, Northeast 16th Avenue, Northeast 135th Street/Opa-Locka Boulevard	
136	Coral Gables Douglas Road station	AM → PM ←	Kendall Southwest 89th Place and Southwest 136th Street	Douglas Road, Old Cutler Road, Southwest 136th Street	3 northbound trips in the afternoon and 3 southbound trips in the morning (weekdays only)
137	Sweetwater Dolphin Mall Metrobus Terminal	↔	Cutler Bay South Dade Government Center	211th Street, Southwest 137th Avenue, West Flagler Street, Northwest 107th Avenue	
150 Miami Beach Airport Express	Miami International Airport Miami Intermodal Center	↔	South Pointe Washington Avenue and South Pointe Drive	FL-112, I-95, Julia Tuttle Causeway, Indian Creek Drive/Washington Avenue/Collins Avenue	Express from Miami Intermodal Center to Miami Beach; Limited-stop in Miami Beach
152	Palmetto Estates, Palmetto Bay TransitWay and 152nd Street (Coral Reef Drive station)	↔	Country Walk Southwest 152nd Avenue and Southwest 152nd Street	Coral Reef Drive	
183	Hialeah Okeechobee station	↔	Aventura Avenutra Mall Metrobus Terminal	West 12th Avenue, Northwest 67th Avenue, Miami Gardens Drive, 183rd Street	
199	Country Club Northwest 176th Street and Northwest 58th Avenue	↔	Aventura Avenutra Mall Metrobus Terminal	Ives Dairy Road, County Line Road, Honey Hill Drive, Northwest 57th Avenue	
203 Biscayne MAX	Downtown Miami Downtown Metrobus Terminal	Peak ↔	Aventura Avenutra Mall Metrobus Terminal	Biscayne Boulevard	Limited-stop service
205 Killian MAX	West Kendall West Kendall Transit Terminal	Peak ↔	Dadeland Dadeland North station	Killian Drive	Express and limited-stop service
207 Little Havana Connection	Brickell Brickell station	↻	Little Havana Loop	Clockwise Loop: 2nd Avenue, Southwest 7th Street, Beacorn Boulevard, Southwest 1st Street	
208 Little Havana Connection	Brickell Brickell station	↺	Little Havana Loop	Counterclockwise Loop: West Flagler Street, Beacorn Boulevard, Calle Ocho, 2nd Avenue	
211 Flagler MAX	Downtown Miami Northwest 1st Avenue and Northwest 1st Street	Peak ↔	Sweetwater Southwest 108th Avenue & #30 G	West Flagler Street	Limited-stop service
272 Sunset MAX	West Kendall West Kendall Transit Terminal	Peak ↔	Dadeland Dadeland North station	Sunset Drive	Limited-stop service
279 79th Street MAX	Gladeview Northside station	Peak ↔	Miami Beach Harding Avenue and 72nd Street	Northwest 79th Street, John F. Kennedy Causeway, 71st Street/Normandy Drive	Limited-stop service
287 Saga Bay MAX	Miami-Dade County Community Health of South Florida, Inc. - Doris Ison Health Center	Peak ↔	West Perrine Richmond Drive station	Southwest 216th Street, Southwest 87th Avenue, Southwest 168th Street	Limited-stop service
288 Kendall MAX	West Kendall West Kendall Transit Terminal	Peak ↔	Dadeland Dadeland North station	Snapper Creek Expressway, Kendall Drive	Limited-stop service
301 Dade-Monroe Express	Florida City Southwest 344th Street station	↔	Marathon US-1 Mile Marker 50	US-1	Express service
302 Card Sound Express	Florida City West Palm Drive and Northwest 4th Avenue	↔	Key Largo Ocean Reef Club	Card Sound Road, CR-905	Express service; 4 round trips per day
338 Weekend Express	Miami International Airport Miami Intermodal Center	↔	Sweetwater Dolphin Mall Metrobus Terminal	Dolphin Expressway	Express service; Weekends only
344	Homestead English Avenue and Park Place (Miami-Dade College Homestead Campus)	↔	Florida City Southwest 193rd Avenue and Southeast 378th Street	Krome Avenue, Palm Drive, Redland Road, Tower Road	No Sunday service
400 South Owl	Kendall Dadeland South station	↔	Downtown Miami Southwest 1st Street and 1st Court (Government Center station)	US-1	Night bus; Limited-stop service
401 North Owl	North Miami Beach Northeast 167th Street and Northeast 15th Avenue	↔	Downtown Miami Southwest 1st Avenue and Southwest 1st Street	Northeast 167th Street, Palmetto Service Road, Northwest 22nd Avenue, Northwest 12th Avenue, Northwest 2nd Avenue	Night bus
500 Cutler Bay Local	Cutler Bay Old Cutler Road & #20330	↻	Cutler Bay Loop	Clockwise Loop: Old Cutler Road, Franjo Road, Caribbean Boulevard, 211th Street, US-1, Eureka Drive, Southwest 87th Avenue	
510 Skylake Circulator	Sky Lake Northeast 167th Street and Northeast 15th Avenue	↔	Sky Lake Northeast 185th Street and 18th Avenue	Northeast 163rd Street, Northeast 19th Avenue, Miami Gardens Drive, 18th Avenue, Northeast 191st Street	
601 Metro Express	Florida City Southwest 344th Street station	↔	Kendall Dadeland South station	South Dade TransitWay	BRT service stopping at all 14 stations on the South Dade TransitWay with no other stops
602 TransitWay Local	Florida City Southwest 344th Street station	↔	Kendall Dadeland South station	South Dade TransitWay	Limited-stop service making local stops along the South Dade TransitWay
836	Sweetwater Dolphin Station Park and Ride	↔	Downtown Miami Southeast 1st Street and 1st Avenue	Dolphin Expressway	Weekdays only; Only makes stops going southbound in Downtown, before returning to Dolphin Station
837	West End Tamiami Station Park and Ride	Peak ↔	Downtown Miami Southeast 1st Street and 1st Avenue	Dolphin Expressway	Weekday rush hours only; Only makes stops going southbound in Downtown, before returning to Tamiami Station

== See also ==
- List of Miami-Dade Transit metro stations
- Track buses throughout Miami-Dade County
- Better Bus Project website
