= Loft (disambiguation) =

A loft is a type of room or dwelling.

Loft, LOFT, or The Loft may also refer to:

== Arts, entertainment, and media ==
=== Films ===
- Loft (2005 film), a 2005 Japanese film
- Loft (2007 film), a 2007 Indian Malayalam-language film, see List of films released in Malaysia (2007)
- Loft (2008 film), a 2008 Belgian film
- Loft (2010 film), a 2010 Dutch film (remake of the Belgian film)
- The Loft (2014 film), an American film (remake of the Belgian film)

=== Music ===
- Loft (band), a German Eurodance band
- The Loft (British band), a British indie band
- The Loft (Danish band), a Danish band

=== Other uses in arts, entertainment, and media ===
- The Loft (Sirius XM), a music channel on satellite radio
- LOFT (dance program), a dance residency program and studio in Adelaide, Australia

== Brands and enterprises ==
- Loft (store), a Japanese chain store
- LOFT, a division of Ann Taylor (clothing retailer)
- Loft, Inc., a former candy making and retailing concern
- The Loft (New York City), a New York nightclub
- "The Loft Miami" complex, comprising "The Loft" and "The Loft 2", residential skyscrapers in Miami

== Science and technology ==
- Loft (3D), a 3D modeling technique
- LOFT (LOCA), a study of behavior of nuclear fuel during loss of fluid or loss of coolant in a reactor
- LOFT or Large Observatory For X-ray Timing, a proposed high-energy astronomy space mission

== People ==
- Loft (surname)

== Other uses ==
- Line-oriented flight training or LOFT, a type of training in a flight simulator
- Loft, a measure of density of down or other insulating material
- Loft, the angle between a golf club's face and the vertical plane
- Loft (building), a type of medieval building in Norway
- Loft bed, a type of bunk bed
- Loft Crag, mountain in the English Lake District
- Pigeon loft, housing for domestic pigeons

== See also ==
- Lofting (disambiguation)
- Lofty (disambiguation)
- L0pht, pronounced "loft", a former hacker collective centered in Boston, MA
