= List of Metrobus routes =

List of Metrobus routes may refer to:

- List of Metrobus routes (Miami-Dade County)
- List of Metrobus routes (Washington, D.C.)
