= Centro Lofts =

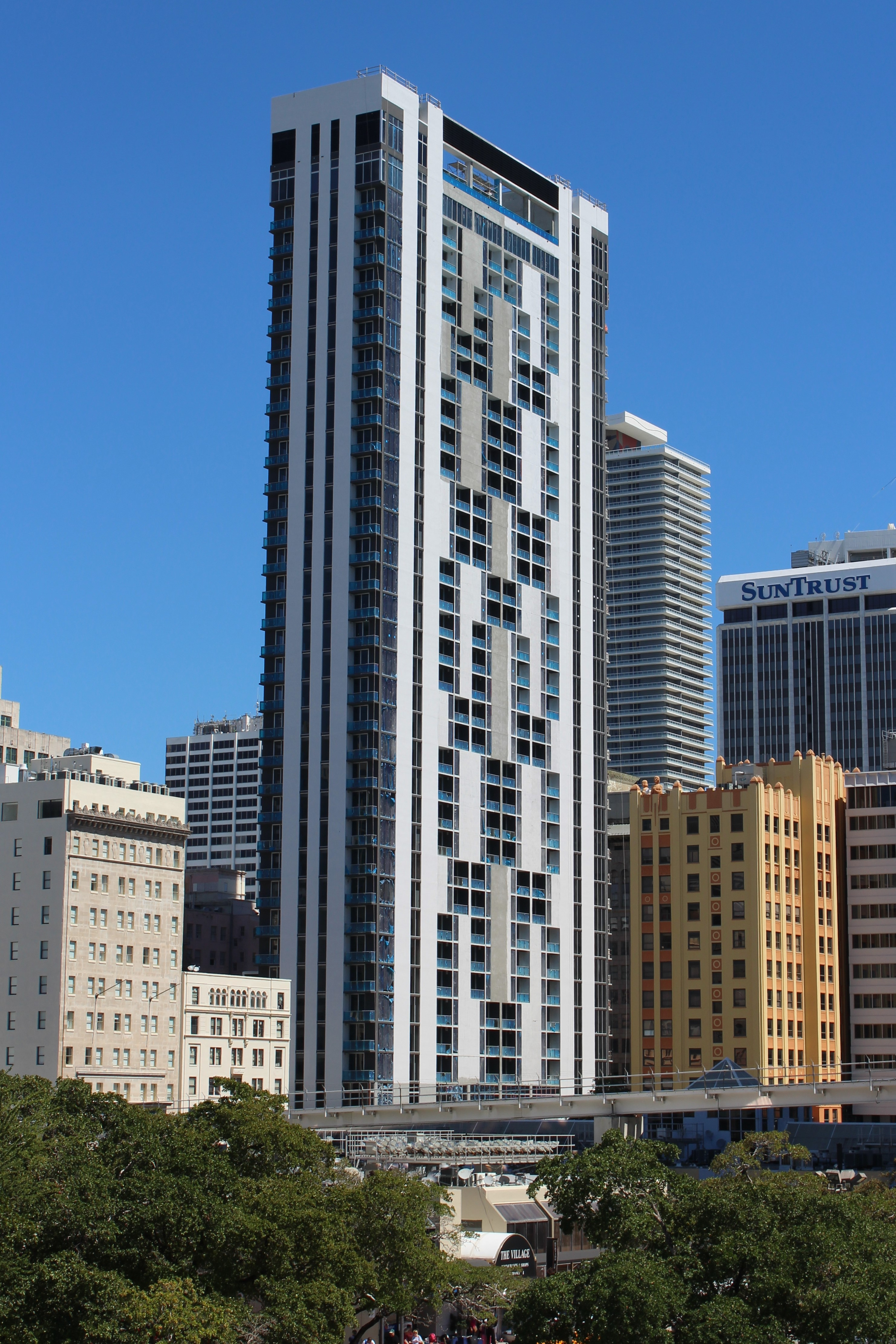
- Centro in early 2016

- Location within Florida

General information
- Status: Completed
- Type: Residential condominium
- Location: 151 SE 1st Street Miami, Florida 33131
- Coordinates: 25.7735°N 80.1927°W
- Construction started: 2013
- Completed: 2016

Height
- Roof: 428 ft (130 m)

Technical details
- Floor count: 36

Design and construction
- Architect: Sieger Suárez
- Developer: Newgard
- Main contractor: Tutor-Perini

References
- "Centro Lofts Miami". CVU Skyscraper Center.

Centro Lofts is a high-rise loft condominium project in Downtown CBD of Miami, Florida. Construction began in December 2013, and the project opened in mid 2016. The project, which has 352 units, is unique for being one of the few modern buildings in the downtown Miami area, along with The Loft and The Loft 2, to have no parking garage. Touting a location near Metromover, Metrorail, the Miami Trolley, and in the once again walkable downtown area, the project will also have an arrangement with Car2Go car sharing service; however, Car2Go suspended service in Miami in early 2016, months before the project opened. The project is located about one block from a Whole Foods store which was recently completed as part of the Met 3 building. Also it will be located centrally, about two blocks in each direction from the Miami Avenue, Knight Center, Bayfront Park, and First Street Metromover stations.

== See also ==
- List of tallest buildings in Miami
