= Loft (surname) =

Loft is also a surname. Notable people with this name include:

- Ange Loft, Canadian performing artist
- Arthur Loft (1897–1947), American actor
- Ben Loft (born 1978), Australian volleyball player
- Doug Loft (born 1986), English footballer
- Fred Loft (1861–1934), Mohawk Nation activist
- George W. Loft (1865–1943), American businessman and politician
- Gerard Francis Loft (1933–2007), New Zealand Roman Catholic bishop
- John Henry Loft (1769–1849), British soldier and politician
- Vagn Loft (1915–1976), Danish field hockey player
- William Loft (1803–1887), British farmer and steeplechase rider, son of John Henry

== See also ==
- Loft (disambiguation)
