= Central Business District (Miami) =

Central business district in the United States

Coordinates: 25.775°N 80.191°W

Central Business District of Miami Downtown Miami
- Neighborhood of Miami
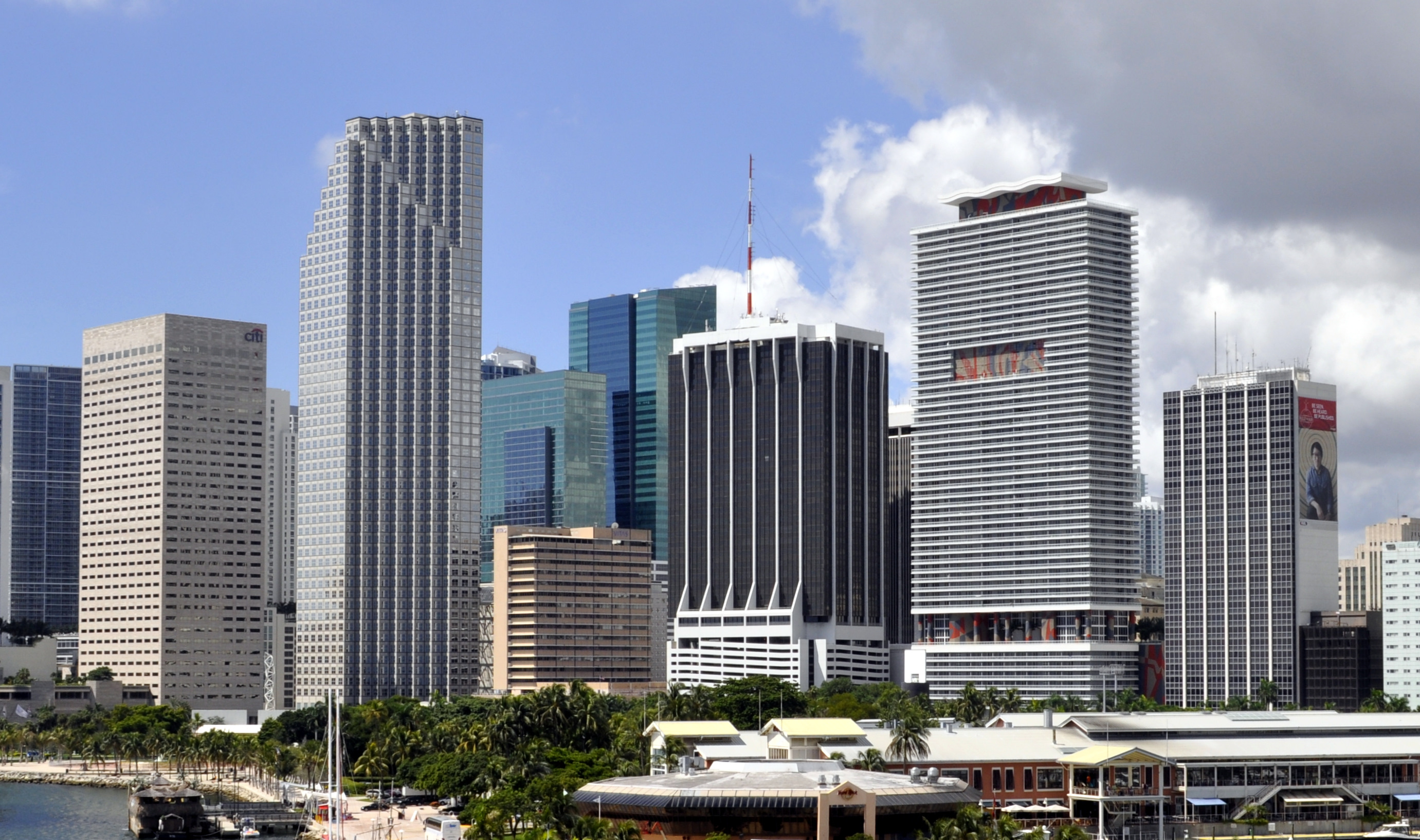

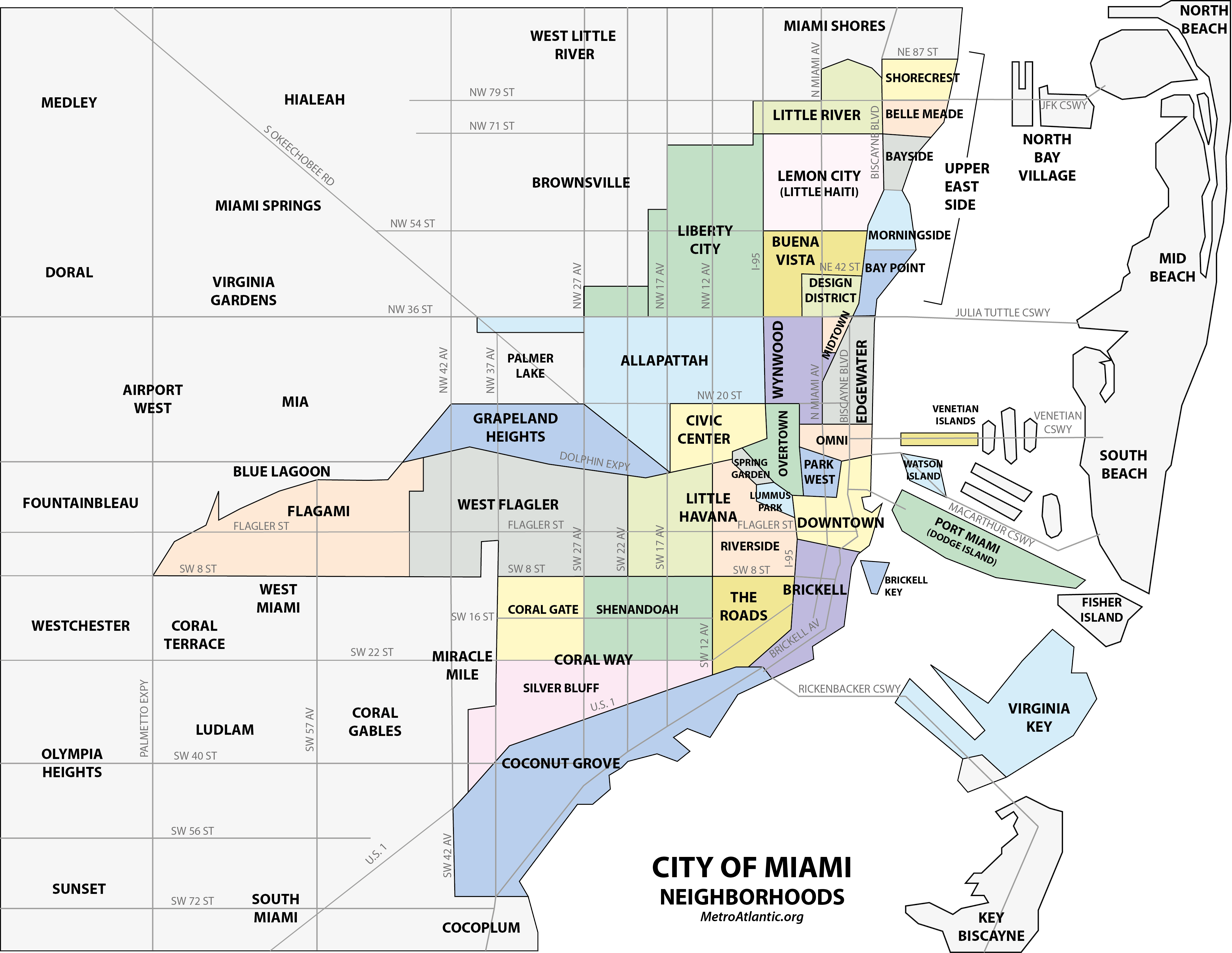
- Country: United States
- State: Florida
- County: Miami-Dade County
- City: Miami
- Time zone: EST

The Central Business District (CBD) of Miami is the historic central business district and city center of what has become Greater Downtown Miami in Florida. Over 92,000 people work in Miami's Central Business District.

The Central Business District is generally bound by Biscayne Boulevard, Bayfront Park and Museum Park on the east, the Miami River to the south, North 6th Street to the north, and Interstate 95 to the west. While it is technically Miami's official "downtown", the term "Downtown Miami" has come to refer to a much larger 3.8-square-mile (10 km^{2}) area along the bay from the Rickenbacker Causeway to the Julia Tuttle Causeway. It is also distinct from the financial district, which neighbors Brickell to the south.

The Central Business District of Miami has over 5,000,000 square feet (460,000 m^{2}) of office space, including more than fifteen buildings with greater than 100,000 sq ft (9,300 m^{2}) of floor space.

== History ==
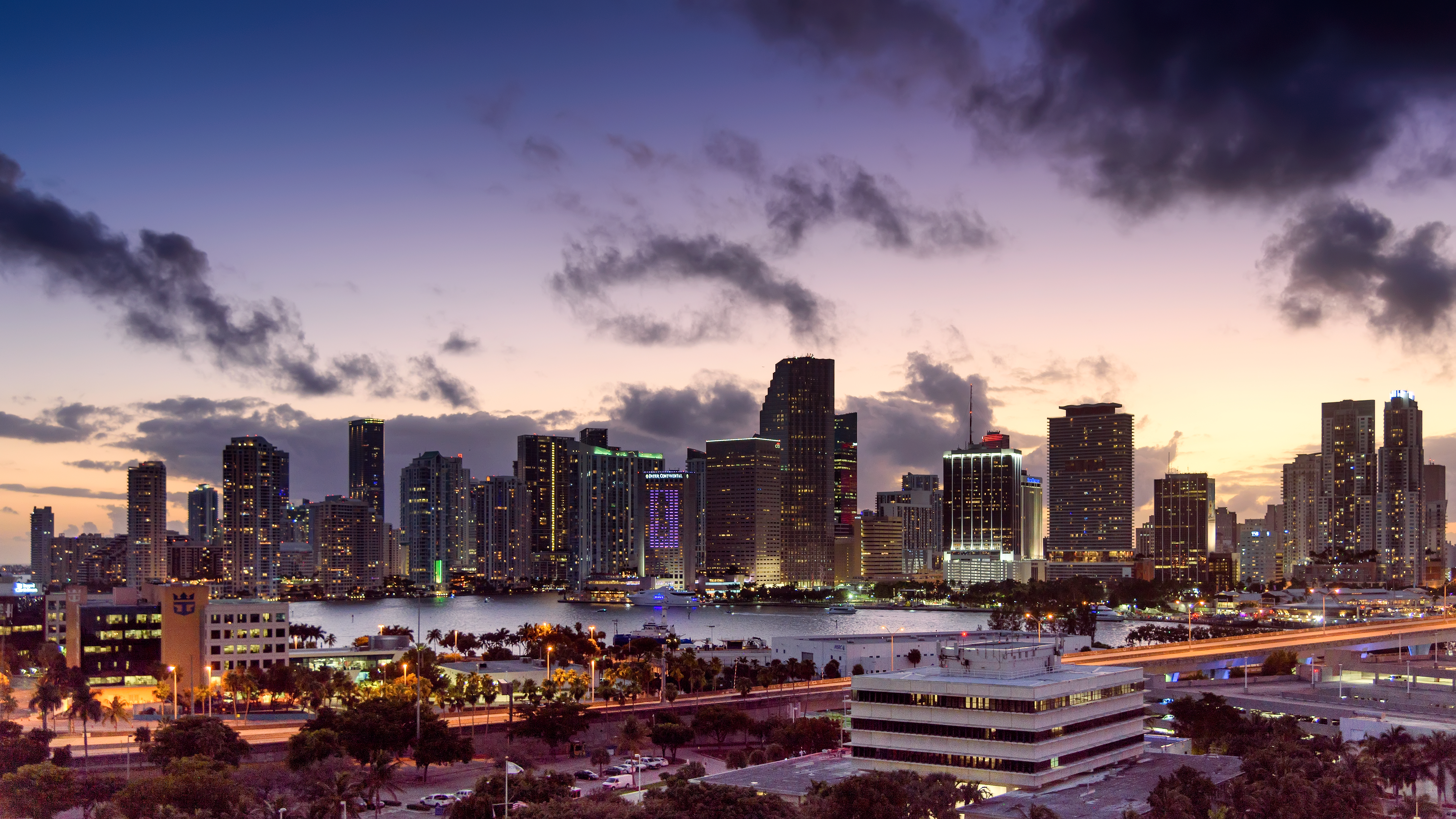
Miami's Central Business District at night seen from the east at Watson Island, January 2019

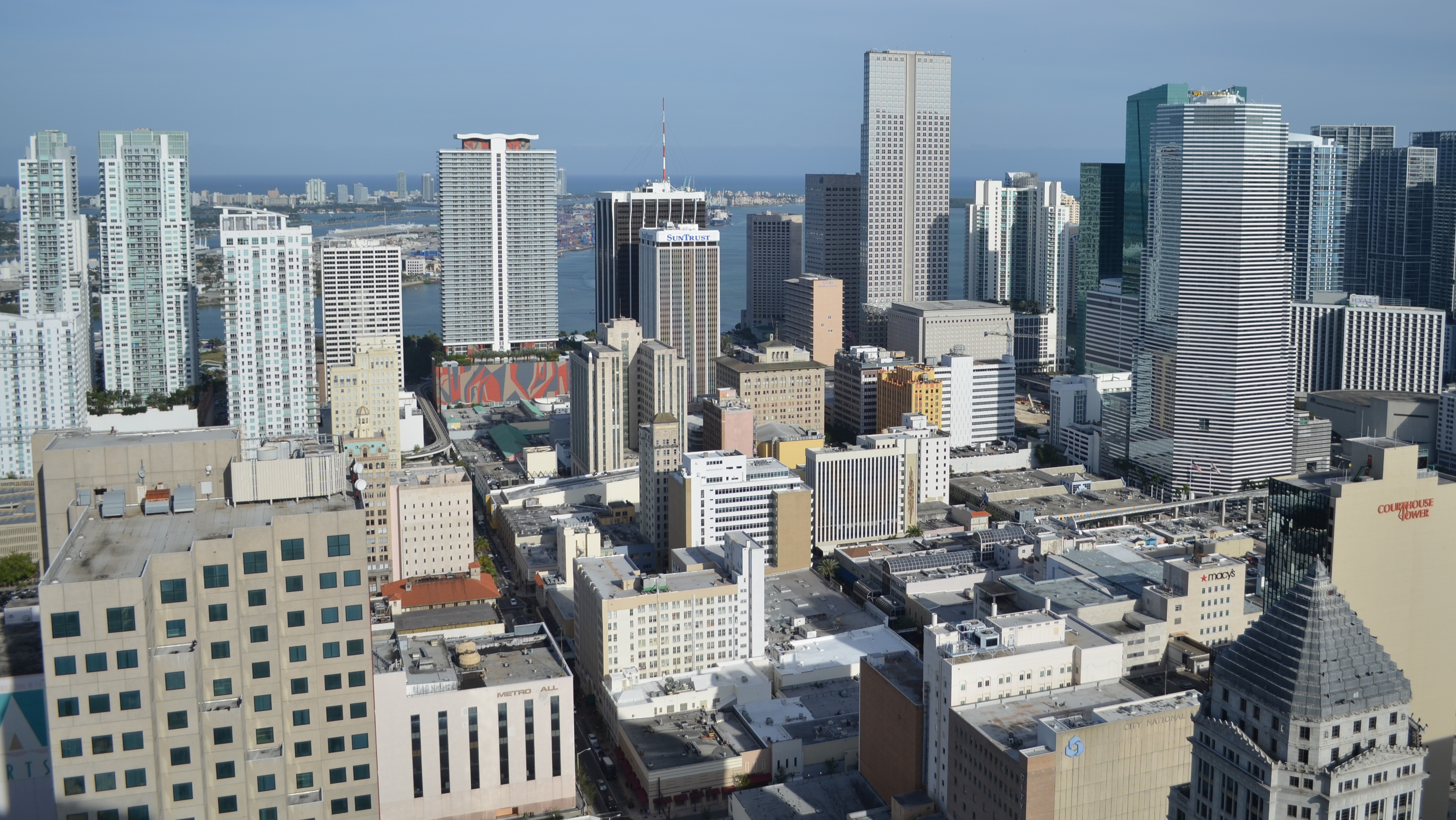
Miami's Central Business District seen from the west with its mix of historic low and mid-rise buildings and newer high-rise buildings, March 2013

The City of Miami was officially incorporated as a city on July 28, 1896, with a population of just over 300. Downtown is the historic heart of Miami, and along with Coconut Grove, is the oldest settled area of Miami, with early pioneer settlement dating to the early 19th century. Urban development began in the 1890s with the construction of the Florida East Coast Railway by Standard Oil industrialist Henry Flagler down to Miami at the insistence of Julia Tuttle. Flagler, along with developers such as William Brickell and George E. Merrick helped bring developer interest to the city with the construction of hotels, resorts, homes, and the extension of Flagler's rail line. Flagler Street, originating in Downtown, is a major east–west road in Miami named after the tycoon; the Julia Tuttle Causeway, crossing Biscayne Bay just north of Downtown in Edgewater, is named in honor of Tuttle.

== Character ==
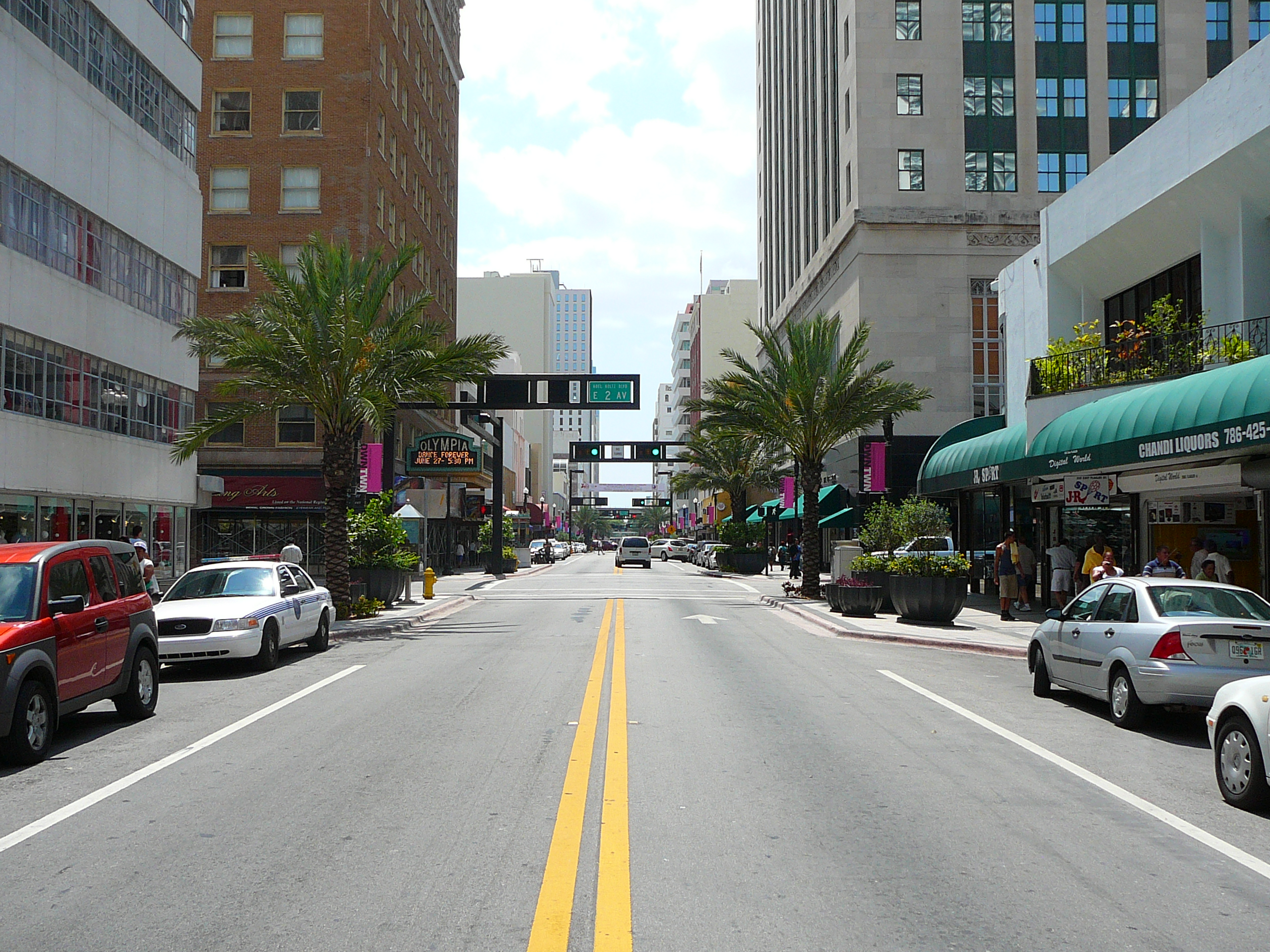
Flagler Street in Miami's Central Business District

The CBD has long been dense with retail and office space, as well as some lofts and apartments, but recently has seen large scale high-rise residential development as during Miami housing market booms in the aughts and continuing again in the 2010s. Though the historically wealthy suburb of Brickell to the south remains much more popular, downtown has seen urban buildings such as The Loft, The Loft 2, and Centro Lofts which have no built-in parking as well as more traditional luxury condos such as the bayfront 50 Biscayne and Vizcayne. Wolfson Campus, the primary (but not largest) campus of Miami-Dade College is located in the CBD, with about ten buildings around NE 5 Street and NE 2 Ave. The historic Flagler Street, which is the north–south divider of the street grid in Miami-Dade, may undergo a major renovation from the Miami River to the terminus at Biscayne Boulevard starting by 2016. The project was publicized in 2014 and has faced several delays.

== Transportation ==
The Metromover Inner Loop is located almost entirely within the CBD, as is Metrorail's Government Center station, where the rapid transit and people mover systems meet. This is the busiest station for both systems and sees over 15,000 riders on an average weekday. It is located on the west side of downtown in the Government Center area, which has a large concentration of city, county, state, and federal offices. The area is also heavily served by the Metrobus (Miami-Dade County) and Miami Trolley, as well as taxicabs, ridesharing companies, and shared scooters. Downtown Miami as defined by Walk Score which includes Park West, Brickell and the Arts & Entertainment District, is considered "very walkable" and as having "world-class public transportation", as well as being "very bikeable".

== Gallery ==
Late 19th thru 20th centuries

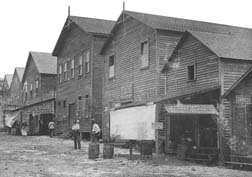
Miami Avenue in 1896, when approximately 400 men voted to incorporate Miami as a city

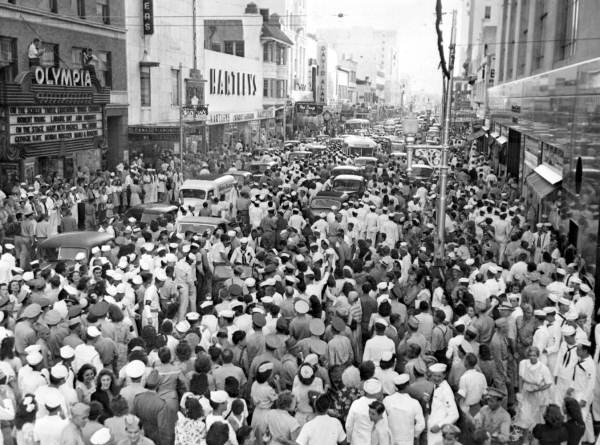
Crowds on Flagler Street in Downtown Miami on August 15, 1945, 20 minutes after the announcement of Japan's surrender at the end of World War II

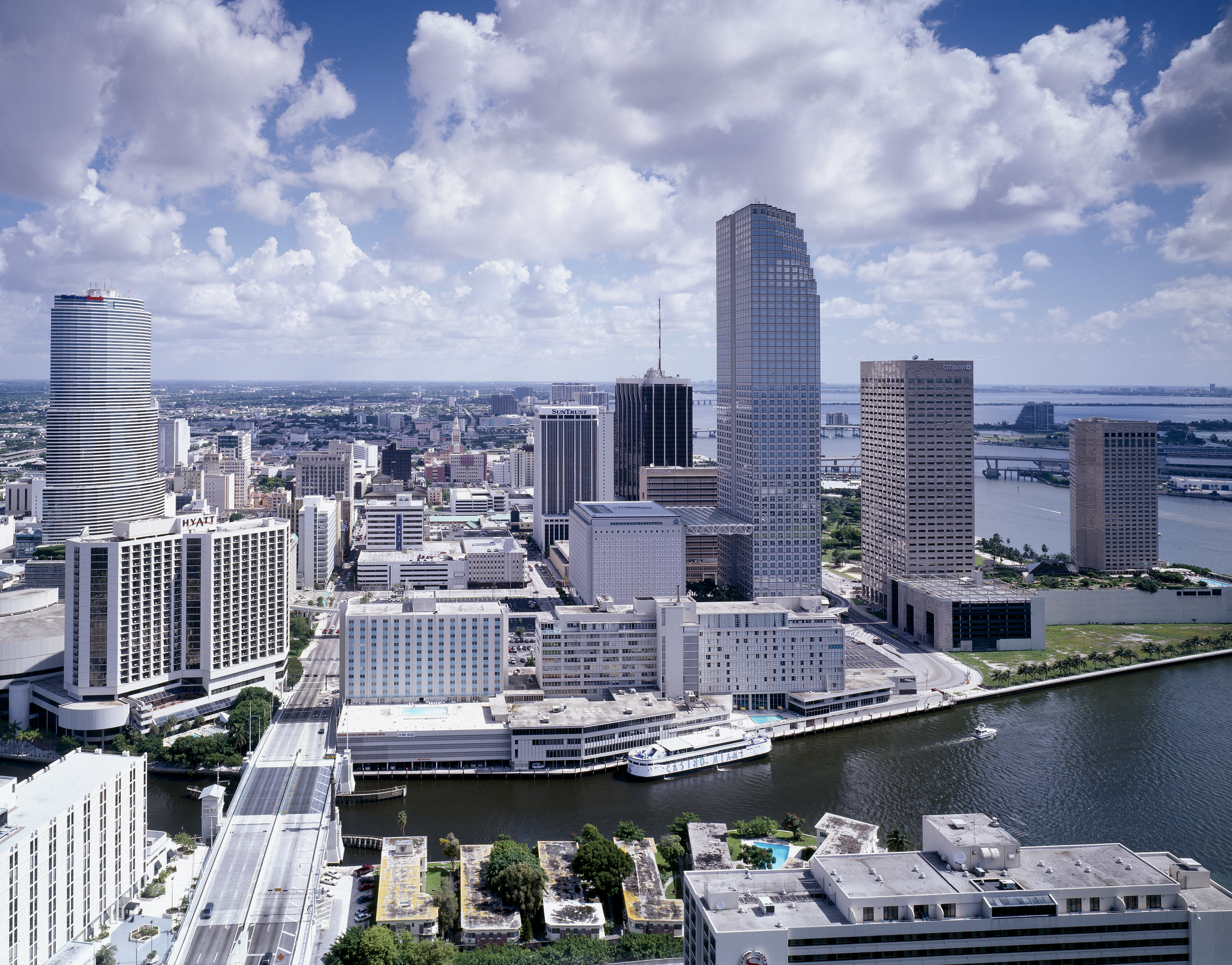
Downtown skyline circa late 1980s
Since 2000

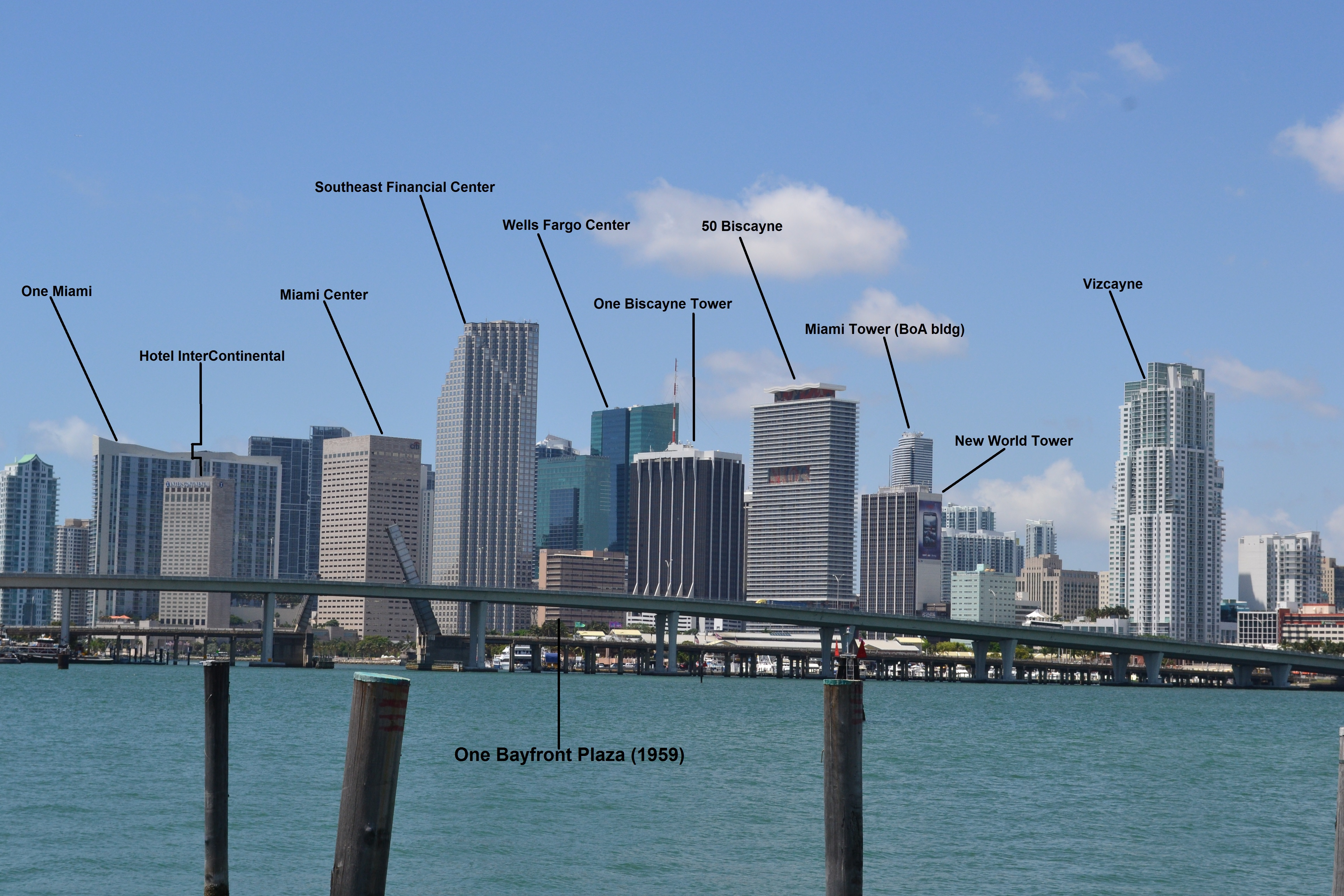
View of downtown over Biscayne Bay with larger buildings marked.

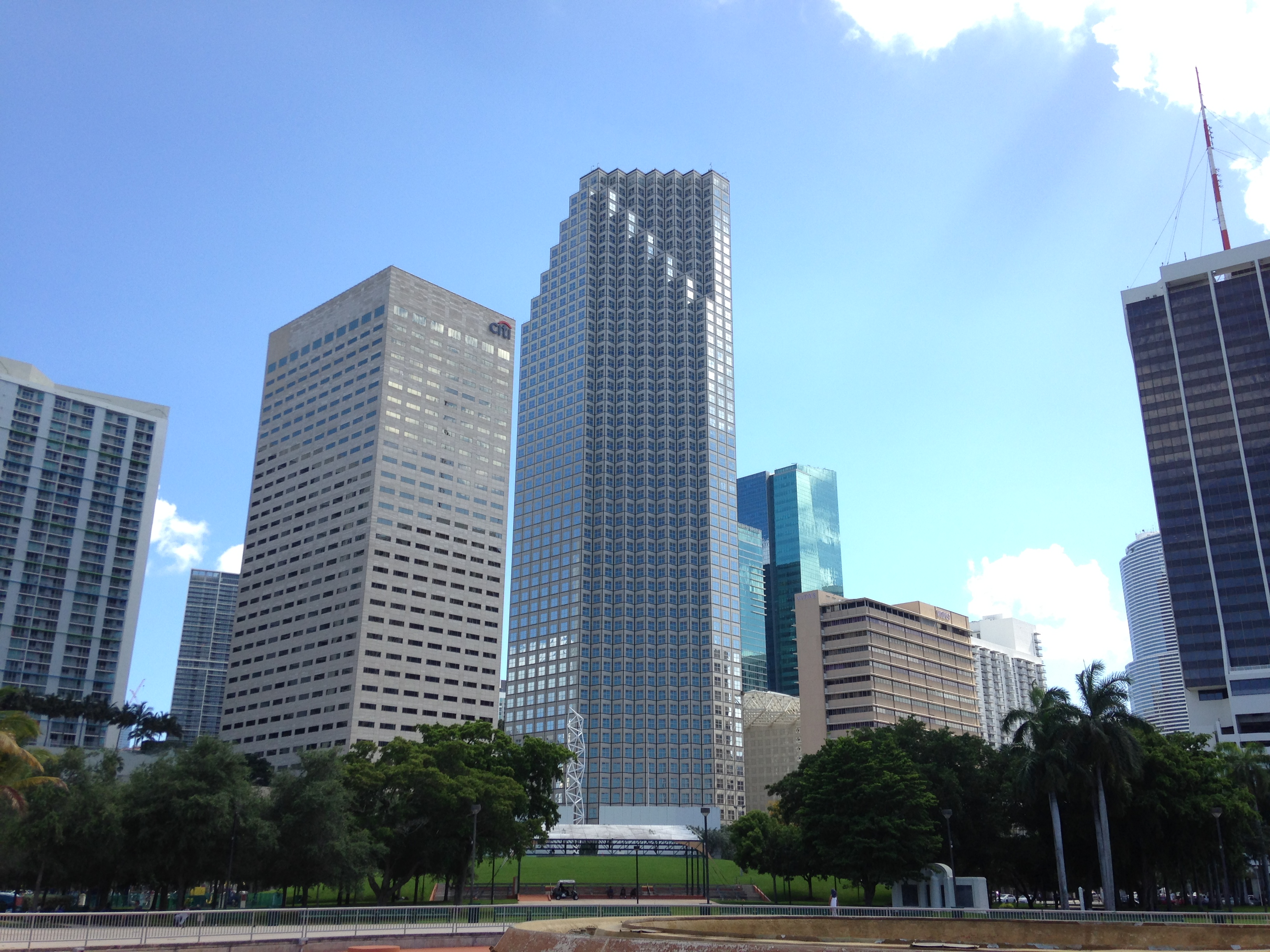
View of downtown skyscrapers from Bayfront Park

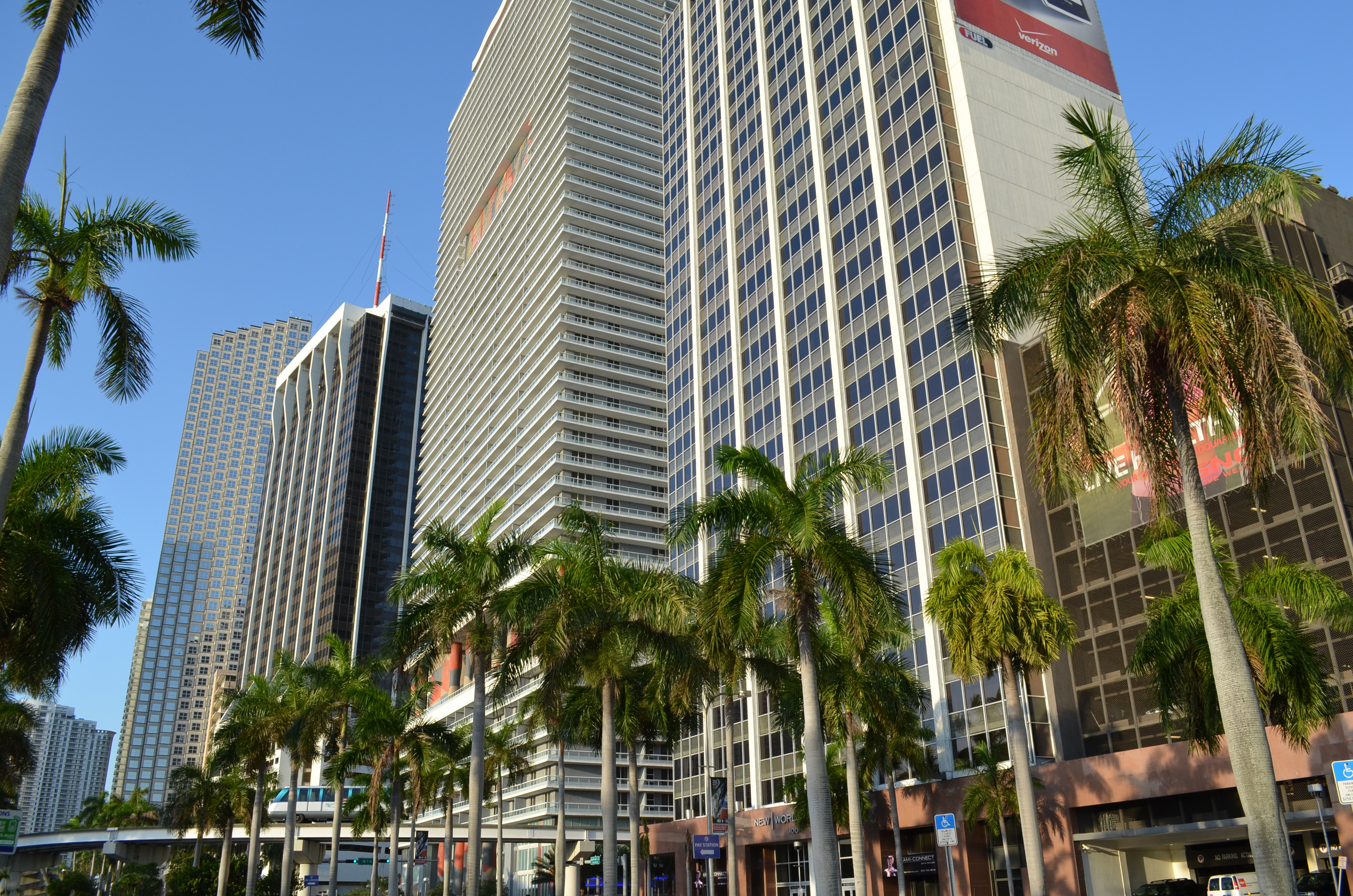
As the CBD has "Manhattanized" along with the Greater Downtown area, a phenomenon known as the "Biscayne Wall" has emerged.

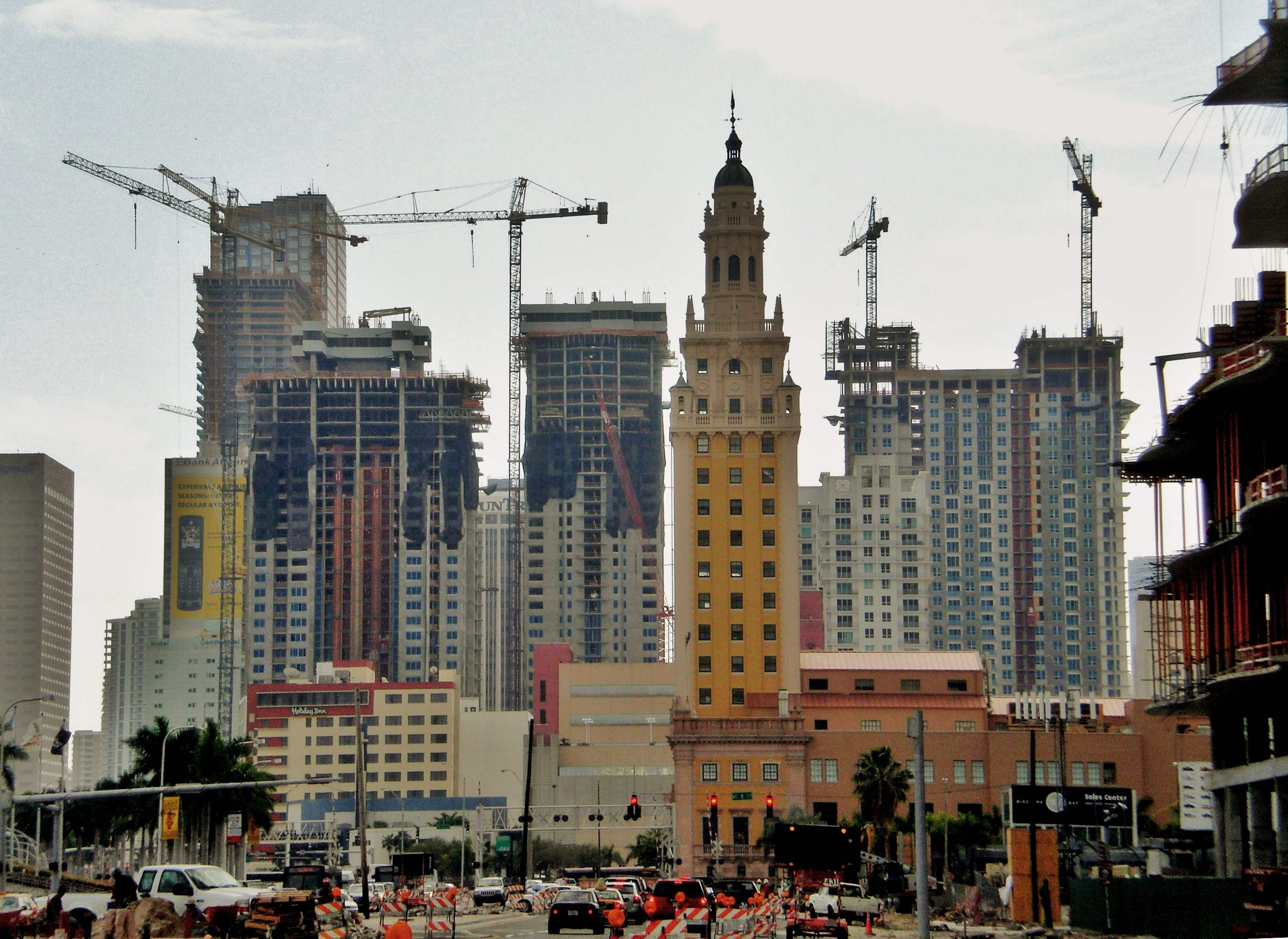
The early "Manhattanization" of downtown Miami, in 2007

== See also ==
- Downtown Miami Historic District
- List of tallest buildings in Miami
