= Lofty =

Lofty may refer to:

== Places ==
- Mount Lofty (disambiguation), several places and associated subjects in Australia

== People ==
- Lofty Blomfield, (1908–1971), New Zealand professional wrestler
- Lofty Drews (born 1940), World Rally Championship co-driver from Kenya
- Lofty England (1911–1995), Jaguar Cars' motorsport manager and later CEO
- Lofty Herman (1907–1987), English first-class cricketer
- Lofty Large (1930–2006), British former Special Air Service soldier and author
- Lofty Wiseman, British former Special Air Service soldier and author

=== Fictional characters ===
- Lofty Holloway, a fictional character in the television series EastEnders
- A personified crane in the BBC children's series Bob the Builder
- A fictional character on the 1986 animated television series My Little Pony
- Gunner "Lofty" Sugden, a fictional character on the 1970s British sitcom It Ain't Half Hot Mum
- Ben "Lofty" Chiltern, a fictional character in the television series Casualty and Holby City
- Lofty, an Oompa-Loompa in the 2023 film Wonka
- Lofty, a fictional giraffe in Milo (TV series)

== Other uses ==
- "Lofty" (Battle for Dream Island), a 2010 web series episode

== See also ==
- Loft (disambiguation)
- W. J. Loftie (1839–1911), British clergyman and writer
- Lotfi A. Zadeh (born 1921), American mathematician, engineer, and computer scientist
- Lotfi Mansouri (1929–2013), Iranian opera director
- Lotty, an English feminine given name
