= Mount Lofty (disambiguation) =

Mount Lofty, a peak in the Mount Lofty Ranges near Adelaide in South Australia.

Mount Lofty may also refer to:

== Australia ==
=== South Australia ===
- Mount Lofty Botanic Garden
- Mount Lofty Fire Tower
- Mount Lofty railway station
- Mount Lofty Ranges, the mountain range that includes Mount Lofty
- Mount Lofty Ranges zone (wine), a wine zone

=== Queensland ===
- Mount Lofty, Queensland, an inner suburb of Toowoomba
- Mount Lofty, a peak on the eastern edge of the Great Dividing Range in southeast Queensland

== See also ==
- Lofty (disambiguation)
