= Miami-Dade County Corrections and Rehabilitation Department =

Government agency in Florida

The Miami-Dade County Corrections and Rehabilitation Department is an agency of the government of Miami-Dade County, Florida. It has its headquarters in the Gladeview census-designated place in an unincorporated area. The agency has the eighth largest jail system in the United States. As of 2012 about 6,000 people are incarcerated in the facilities of the department. The agency houses pre-trial prisoners and post-trial prisoners who are serving sentences of 364 or fewer days.

== Facilities ==
As of 2012, on average the prisons hold around 7,000 prisoners.

- Metro West Detention Center
  - Located in an unincorporated area. It is the largest jail in the county and has a capacity of 3,098 prisoners.
- Pre-Trial Detention Center
  - Located in Miami. It has a capacity of 1,712 prisoners. It houses prisoners of all ranges from those with the most serious charges to those of the most minor charges.
- Training and Treatment Center
  - Located in an unincorporated area. It has a capacity of 1,265 prisoners.
- Turner Guilford Knight Correctional Center (men and women)
  - Located in an unincorporated area. It has a capacity of 1,300 prisoners.
- Women's Detention Center
  - Located in Miami. It has a capacity of 375 prisoners.
