= Lofting (disambiguation) =

Lofting is a drafting technique used to generate curved lines.

It may also refer to:

- Lofting (bowling), a technique used in bowling
- Lofting (surname), list of people with this surname
