= Lofting (bowling) =

Lofting (by a bowler) in bowling is throwing a bowling ball a short or long distance down the lane. This is usually done with the bounce-pass technique, but can also be done with a straight ball. Lofting is sometimes discouraged by the bowling community and bowling alley employees, because it can sometimes cause damage to the ball and lanes. However, this is somewhat untrue. Loft will almost never cause major damage to a ball, nor will lofting cause damage to (synthetic) lanes. Many bowling alleys that use wooden lanes will either have signs that tell the bowlers not to loft, or an employee will inform the bowlers not to do so, because wooden lanes can be dented by a lofted ball. Lofting the ball before the arrows in some bowling alleys is not against the rules. Some professional bowlers do loft a considerable amount under certain lane conditions. Crankers and other high-rev players may be forced to loft under dry conditions in order to delay the ball's reaction and prevent it from over-hooking. Lofting over the gutter is known as "lofting the gutter cap," and is sometimes done when a bowler has to hook the whole lane on a very broken-down oil pattern. It's common for this to happen at qualifying rounds for the US Open.

In the sport of candlepin bowling, "lofting" a ball beyond a lob line situated ten feet (3.05 m) down the lane from the main foul line, without it touching the lane anywhere on the bowler's side of it, is called a lob, and is considered a ball foul, resulting in no counted pinfall from a ball delivered in such a manner, as the ball must first touch the lanebed anywhere on the bowler's side of the lob line to be considered a legal delivery.

== See also ==
- Bowling
- Candlepin bowling
- Hook (bowling)
- Ten pin bowling
