= South Miami station =

Miami-Dade Transit metro station

●● South Miami
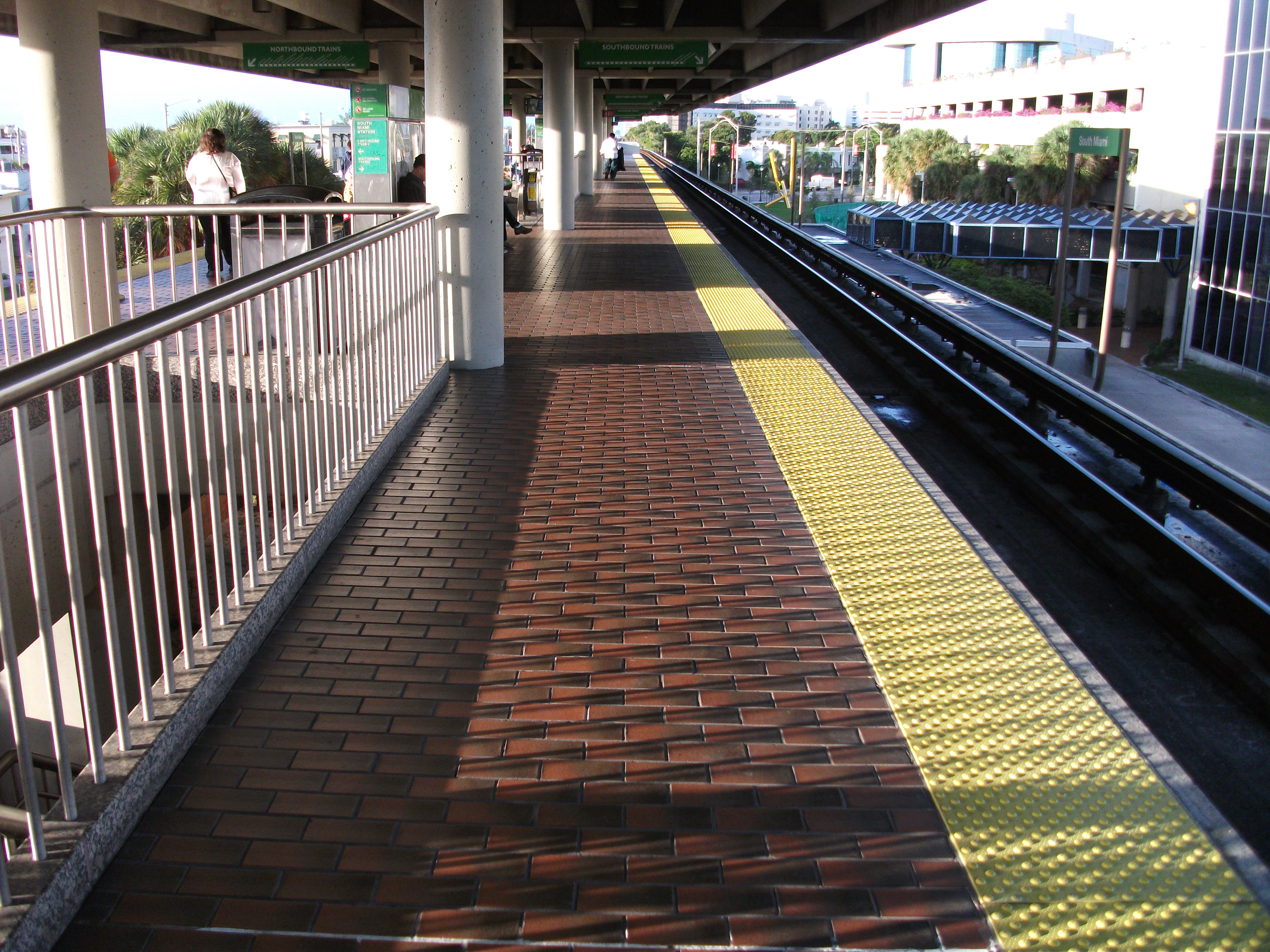
- Morning view of platform and southbound track

General information
- Location: 5949 South Dixie Highway; Miami, Florida
- Coordinates: 25°42′18″N 80°17′20″W
- Owner: Miami-Dade County
- Platforms: 1 island platform
- Tracks: 2
- Connections: Metrobus: 37, 72, 73, 400

Construction
- Parking: Garage (1774 spaces)
- Cycle facilities: Rack
- Accessible: Yes

Other information
- Station code: SMI

History
- Opened: May 20, 1984

Passengers
- 2012: 1.1 million ▲5%

Services
Preceding station	Miami-Dade Transit	Following station
Dadeland North toward Dadeland South	Green Line	University toward Palmetto
Dadeland North toward Dadeland South	Orange Line	University toward Miami Int'l Airport
Location

South Miami station is a station on the Metrorail rapid transit system in South Miami, Florida. This station is located at the intersection of South Dixie Highway (US 1) and Sunset Drive (SW 72nd Street/SR 986), two blocks west of Red Road (West 57th Avenue). It opened to service May 20, 1984.

South Miami provides access to The Shops at Sunset Place, as well as a number of local hospitals.

== Station layout ==
The station has two tracks served by an island platform, with a parking garage immediately west of the platform.
