= University station (Miami-Dade County) =

Miami-Dade Transit metro station

●● University
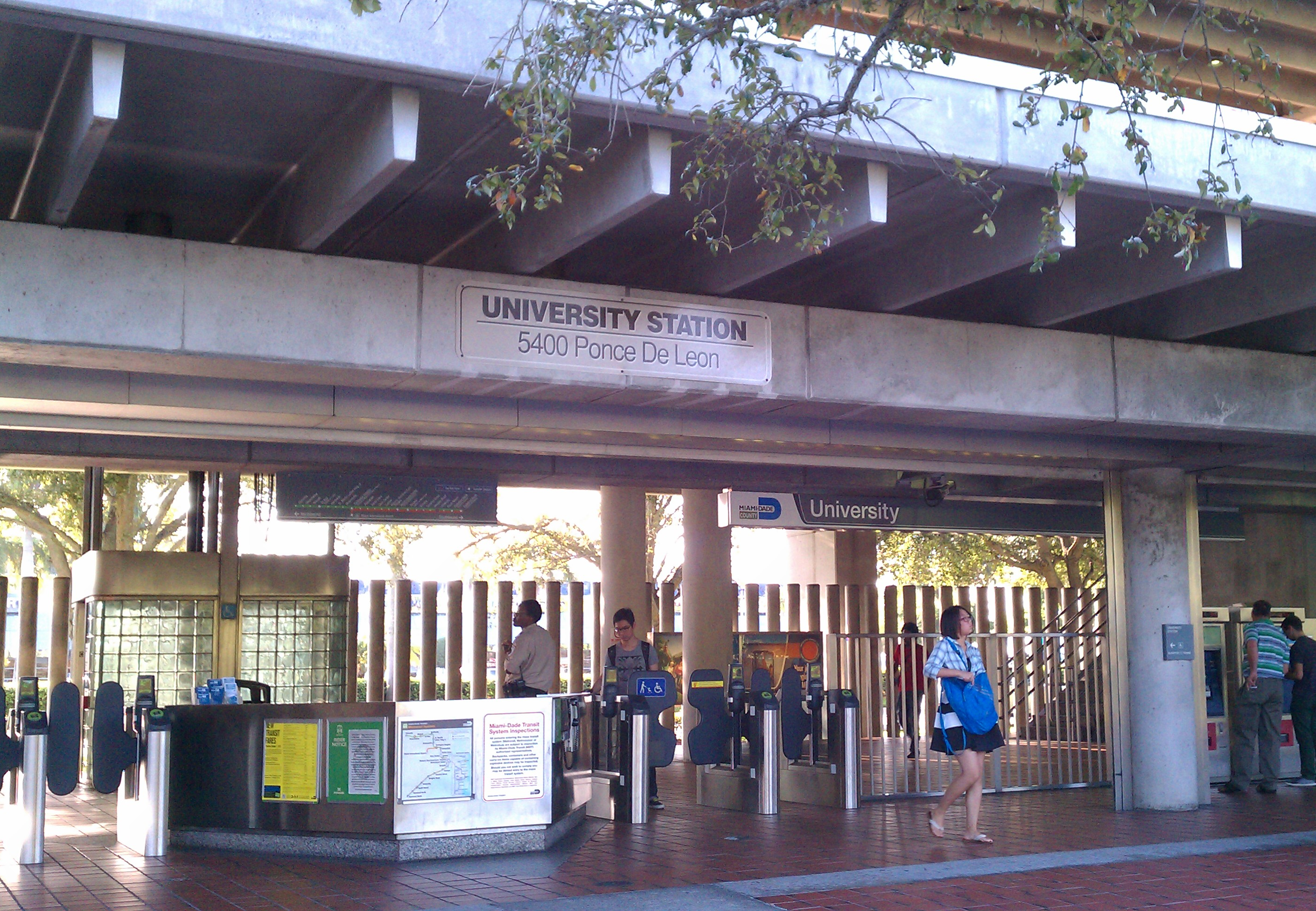
- University station during morning commute, December 2013

General information
- Location: 5400 Ponce de Leon Boulevard; Coral Gables, Florida
- Coordinates: 25°42′53″N 80°16′36″W
- Owner: Miami-Dade County
- Platforms: 1 island platform
- Tracks: 2
- Connections: Metrobus: 56, 57, 400; UM ‘Canes Shuttle

Construction
- Parking: Park and ride (401 spaces)
- Cycle facilities: Rack
- Accessible: Yes

Other information
- Station code: UNV

History
- Opened: May 20, 1984

Passengers
- 2012: 636,000 ▲16%

Services
Preceding station	Miami-Dade Transit	Following station
South Miami toward Dadeland South	Green Line	Douglas Road toward Palmetto
South Miami toward Dadeland South	Orange Line	Douglas Road toward Miami Int'l Airport
Location

University station is a station on the Metrorail rapid transit system at the University of Miami in Coral Gables, Florida, United States. The station is located at 5400 Ponce de Leon Boulevard at the intersection of Dixie Highway (US 1) and Mariposa Court.

The stop provides convenient transportation for University of Miami students, staff, and resident physicians traveling between the university's main campus in Coral Gables campus and the medical campus at the Jackson Memorial Hospital at the Civic Center station in the Health District. It also offers direct access to Downtown Miami and Miami International Airport.

The station opened on May 20, 1984.

== Station layout ==
The station has two tracks served by an island platform. Parking is located in a surface lot north of the station underneath the tracks.
