= Northside station =

Miami-Dade Transit metro station

● Northside

General information
- Location: 3150 NW 79th Street; Miami, Florida
- Coordinates: 25°50′44″N 80°14′55″W
- Owner: Miami-Dade County
- Platforms: 2 side platforms
- Tracks: 2
- Connections: Metrobus: 12, 21, 32, 79, 279

Construction
- Parking: Park and ride
- Accessible: Yes

Other information
- Station code: NSD

History
- Opened: May 19, 1985

Passengers
- 2011: 507,000 ▲8%

Services
Preceding station	Miami-Dade Transit	Following station
Dr. Martin Luther King Jr. Plaza toward Dadeland South	Green Line	Tri-Rail toward Palmetto
Location

Northside station is a station on the Metrorail rapid transit service in Gladeview, Florida. This station is located near the intersection of 79th Street (SR 934) and Northwest 31st Avenue, opening to service May 19, 1985.

== Places of interest ==
- Northside Shopping Plaza
- Flea Market USA
- Walmart supercenter
- Ross Dress for Less
- West Little River
