= Gladeview, Florida =

- Census-designated place
- Location in Miami-Dade County and the state of Florida

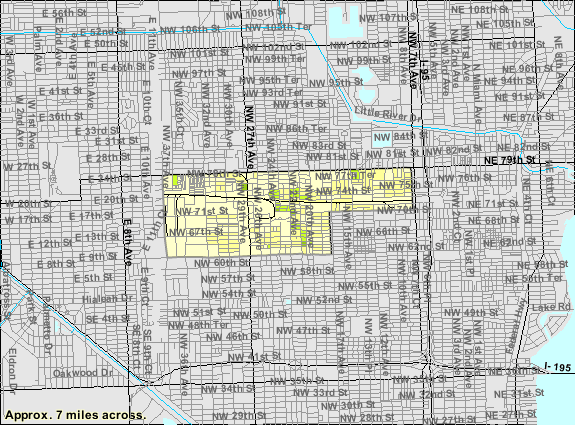
- U.S. Census Bureau map showing CDP boundaries
- Coordinates: 25°50′20″N 80°14′45″W
- Country: United States
- State: Florida
- County: Miami-Dade

Area
  - Total: 2.56 sq mi (6.64 km^{2})
  - Land: 2.56 sq mi (6.63 km^{2})
  - Water: 0.0039 sq mi (0.01 km^{2})
- Elevation: 7 ft (2.1 m)

Population (2020)
  - Total: 14,927
  - Density: 5,830/sq mi (2,250/km^{2})
- Time zone: UTC-5 (Eastern (EST))
  - Summer (DST): UTC-4 (EDT)
- ZIP Codes: 33147, 33150 (Miami)
- Area codes: 305, 786, 645
- FIPS code: 12-25987
- GNIS feature ID: 2402526

Gladeview is a census-designated place (CDP) in Miami-Dade County, Florida, United States. It is part of the Miami metropolitan area of South Florida. The population was 14,927 at the 2020 census, up from 11,535 in 2010.

Gladeview was originally a neighborhood of the city of Miami when it was annexed in 1925. With the arrival of the Great Depression, Miami gave up its jurisdiction and Gladeview became an unincorporated area of Miami-Dade County.

== Geography ==
Gladeview is located 7 miles (11 km) northwest of downtown Miami. Gladeview is bordered by Brownsville to the south, the Miami neighborhood of Liberty City to the east, and West Little River to the north. The city of Hialeah is located to the west of Gladeview.

According to the United States Census Bureau, the CDP has a total area of 2.6 square miles (6.7 km^{2}), of which 0.005 square miles (3 acres), or 0.19%, are water.

== Demographics ==
Historical population
Census	Pop.	Note	%±
1980	18,919		—
1990	15,637		−17.3%
2000	14,468		−7.5%
2010	11,535		−20.3%
2020	14,927		29.4%
U.S. Decennial Census

=== Racial and ethnic composition ===
Gladeview CDP, Florida – Racial and ethnic composition Note: the US Census treats Hispanic/Latino as an ethnic category. This table excludes Latinos from the racial categories and assigns them to a separate category. Hispanics/Latinos may be of any race.
Race / Ethnicity (NH = Non-Hispanic)	Pop 2000	Pop 2010	Pop 2020	% 2000	% 2010	% 2020
White alone (NH)	256	159	277	1.77%	1.38%	1.86%
Black or African American alone (NH)	10,967	8,429	8,783	75.80%	73.07%	58.84%
Native American or Alaska Native alone (NH)	12	10	9	0.08%	0.09%	0.06%
Asian alone (NH)	12	23	18	0.08%	0.20%	0.12%
Native Hawaiian or Pacific Islander alone (NH)	3	0	1	0.02%	0.00%	0.01%
Other race alone (NH)	11	16	96	0.08%	0.14%	0.64%
Mixed race or Multiracial (NH)	123	112	184	0.85%	0.97%	1.23%
Hispanic or Latino (any race)	3,084	2,786	5,559	21.32%	24.15%	37.24%
Total	14,468	11,535	14,927	100.00%	100.00%	100.00%

=== 2020 census ===
As of the 2020 census, Gladeview had a population of 14,927. The median age was 34.3 years. 27.4% of residents were under the age of 18 and 10.9% of residents were 65 years of age or older. For every 100 females there were 88.7 males, and for every 100 females age 18 and over there were 83.5 males age 18 and over.

100.0% of residents lived in urban areas, while 0.0% lived in rural areas.

There were 5,000 households in Gladeview, of which 39.9% had children under the age of 18 living in them. Of all households, 23.9% were married-couple households, 21.5% were households with a male householder and no spouse or partner present, and 46.3% were households with a female householder and no spouse or partner present. About 24.0% of all households were made up of individuals and 7.4% had someone living alone who was 65 years of age or older.

There were 5,435 housing units, of which 8.0% were vacant. The homeowner vacancy rate was 0.9% and the rental vacancy rate was 5.5%.

=== Demographic estimates ===
The 2016-2020 American Community Survey estimated that there were 2,758 families residing in the CDP.

=== 2010 census ===
As of the 2010 United States census, there were 11,535 people, 3,339 households, and 2,378 families residing in the CDP.

=== 2000 census ===
As of the census of 2000, there were 14,468 people, 4,359 households, and 3,199 families residing in the CDP. The population density was 5,694.2 inhabitants per square mile (2,198.5/km^{2}). There were 5,107 housing units at an average density of 2,010.0 per square mile (776.1/km^{2}). The racial makeup of the CDP was 17.59% White (1.8% were Non-Hispanic White), 76.98% African American, 0.21% Native American, 0.17% Asian, 0.03% Pacific Islander, 2.48% from other races, and 2.54% from two or more races. Hispanic or Latino of any race were 21.32% of the population.

As of 2000, there were 4,359 households, out of which 39.5% had children under the age of 18 living with them, 25.3% were married couples living together, 40.3% had a female householder with no husband present, and 26.6% were non-families. 21.2% of all households were made up of individuals, and 9.1% had someone living alone who was 65 years of age or older. The average household size was 3.30 and the average family size was 3.88.

In 2000, in the CDP, the population was spread out, with 38.0% under the age of 18, 10.3% from 18 to 24, 25.9% from 25 to 44, 16.1% from 45 to 64, and 9.8% who were 65 years of age or older. The median age was 26 years. For every 100 females, there were 86.1 males. For every 100 females age 18 and over, there were 77.5 males.

In 2000, the median income for a household in the CDP was $15,981, and the median income for a family was $17,625. Males had a median income of $20,732 versus $19,923 for females. The per capita income for the CDP was $7,941. About 48.4% of families and 52.8% of the population were below the poverty line, including 65.5% of those under age 18 and 32.7% of those age 65 or over.

As of 2000, speakers of English as a first language accounted for 74.32% of residents while Spanish made up 22.48%, and French Creole was at 2.39%, and French consisted of 0.79% of the population.

== Government and infrastructure ==
The Miami-Dade County Corrections and Rehabilitation Department is headquartered in Gladeview.

The Miami-Dade Fire Rescue operates Station 2 Model Cities in Gladeview.

== Education ==
Miami-Dade County Public Schools operates area public schools:

=== Elementary schools ===
- Poinciana Park Elementary School
- Lillie C Evans Elementary School
- Hialeah Elementary School
- South Hialeah Elementary School
- Gladeview Christian School

=== Middle schools ===
- Charles Drew K-8 Center
- Miami Springs Middle School
- Brownsville Middle School

=== High schools ===
- Miami Northwestern Senior High School
- Miami Central High School
- Miami Springs Senior High

== Transportation ==
Gladeview is served by Metrobus throughout the area, the Miami Metrorail, Tri-Rail, and Amtrak:

Metrorail:

- Northside (NW 79th Street and NW 32nd Avenue)
- Dr. Martin Luther King Jr. Plaza (NW 62nd Street and NW 27th Avenue)

Tri-Rail:

- Tri-Rail/Metrorail Transfer (NW 79th Street and NW 37th Avenue)

Amtrak:

- Amtrak-Miami: Silver Star and Silver Meteor service, (NW 79th Street and NW 37th Avenue)
