= The Loft 2 =

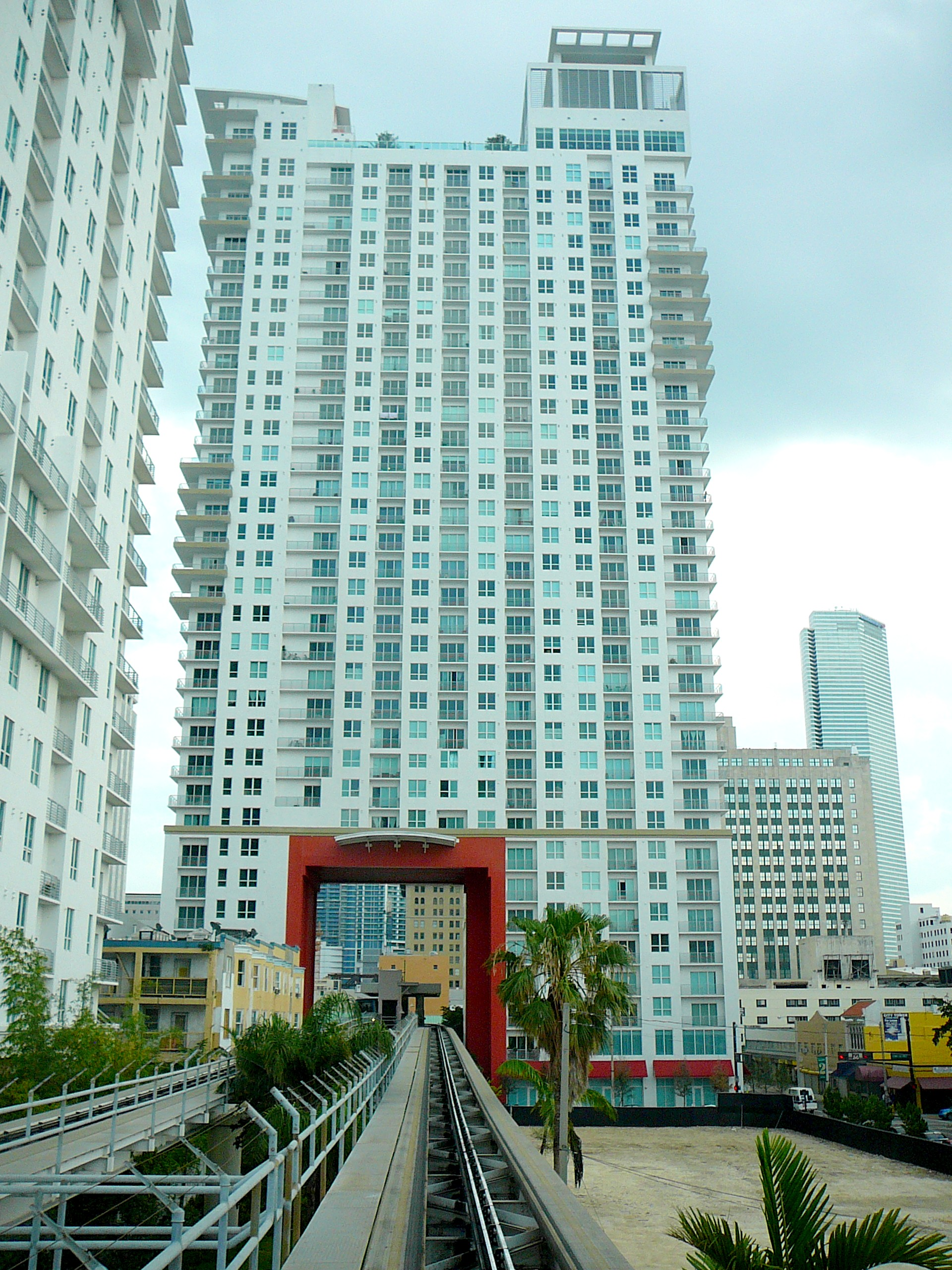
- The Loft 2, one of the buildings that the Miami Metromover tunnels through
- Interactive map of the The Loft 2 area

General information
- Type: Residential
- Location: 133 Northeast 2nd Ave, Miami, Florida, United States
- Coordinates: 25.775876°N 80.189888°W
- Construction started: 2004
- Completed: 2007
- Opening: 2007

Height
- Roof: 433 ft (132 m)

Technical details
- Floor count: 35

Design and construction
- Developer: Related Group

The Loft 2 is a residential skyscraper in the Central Business District of Downtown Miami, Florida, United States. It is part of the complex "Loft Miami", which includes the shorter "The Loft" and "The Loft 3", which was cancelled. The building was completed in 2007. It is 433 ft (144 m) tall and contains 36 floors. The complex is located at NE 2nd Street and NE 2nd Avenue, two blocks west of Biscayne Boulevard. The First Street Metromover Station passes through the Loft 2 building. This made construction especially difficult, as metro train service could not be delayed during construction. Retail occupies the bottom floor, while floors 2-36 are residential lofts and condominiums. The Loft 2 has 496 units which sold out in two and a half days.

The Loft 2 is one of the few buildings in Miami that has a pool on its roof; there is also a lap pool on the ground floor. The gymnasium for the residents is also on the roof, located in a glass enclosure overlooking the northern part of downtown and Biscayne Bay.

== See also ==
- List of tallest buildings in Miami
