= Martin Luther King Jr. Plaza =

Martin Luther King Jr. Plaza may refer to:

- Martin Luther King Jr. Plaza (Toledo), a train station served by Amtrak in Toledo, Ohio
- Dr. Martin Luther King Jr. Plaza station (Metrorail), a train station served by Metrorail in Gladeview, Florida
