= Brownsville Station =

Brownsville station is a rapid transit metro station in Miami, Florida, USA.

Brownsville Station can also refer to:

- Brownsville Station (band), a 1970s American rock band
- Brownsville Station, Ontario, a community in South-West Oxford, Canada
