= Bethany Seventh-day Adventist Church =

Historic church in Florida, US

Coordinates: 25°49′12″N 80°14′20″W

Bethany Seventh-day Adventist Church is an African American congregation of the Seventh-day Adventist Church in Brownsville, Miami, Florida, U.S.. It was established in 1913, and is predominantly African American. The church is located at 2500 NW 50th Street, in Brownsville an unincorporated community of Miami. They hold Saturdays as their holy day.

The church owns other properties, including the Georgette's Tea Room House, a former boarding house with guests that included noted performers and activists in the 1940s and 1950s. Georgette Sargent donated the Georgette's Tea Room House to Bethany Seventh Day Adventist Church in 2012, they are located across the street from each other.
