= Earlington Heights station =

Miami-Dade Transit metro station

●● Earlington Heights
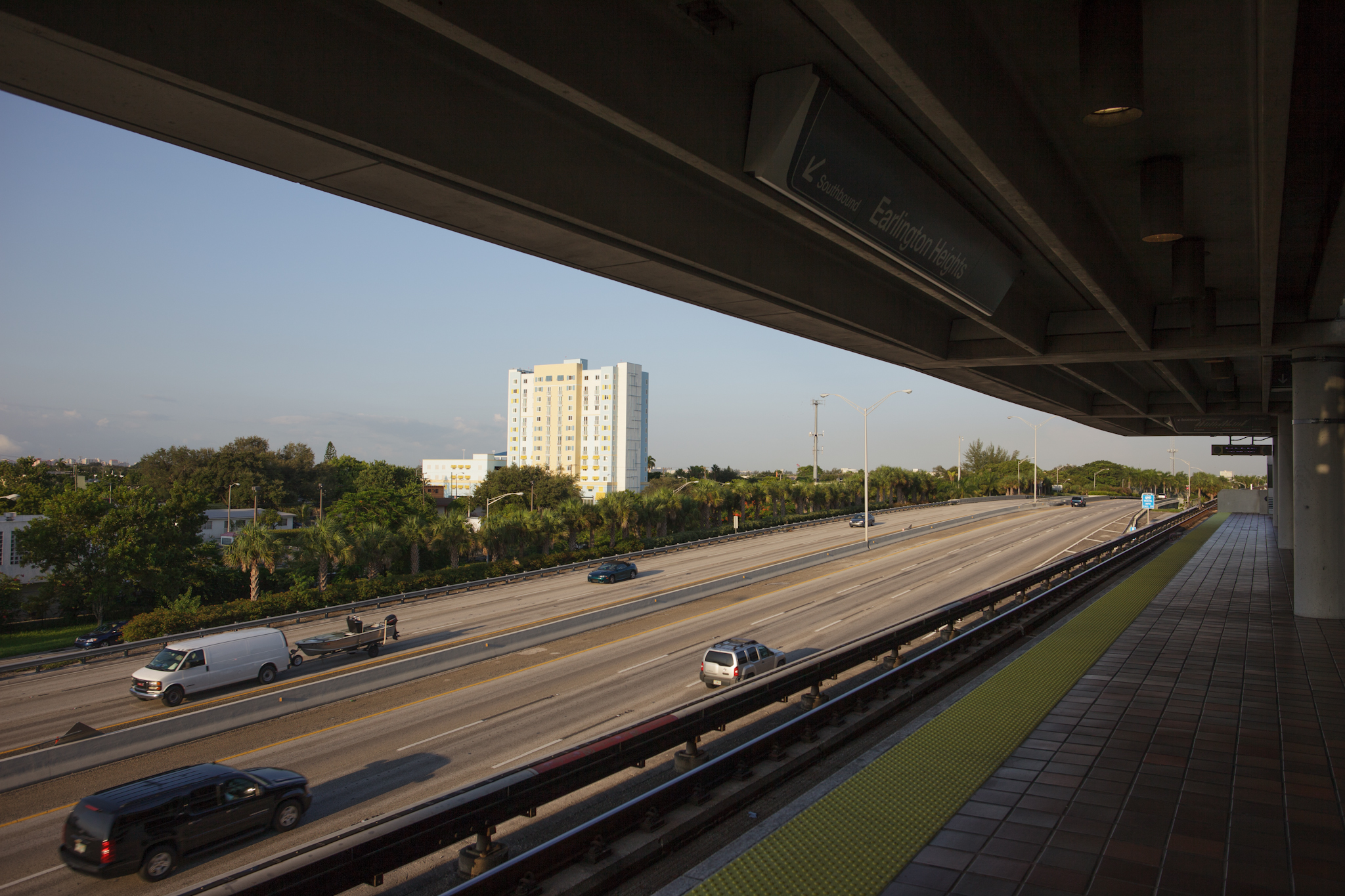
- The Airport Expressway and Allapattah, as seen from the station platform

General information
- Location: 2100 NW 41st Street; Miami, Florida
- Coordinates: 25°48′45″N 80°13′48″W
- Owner: Miami-Dade County
- Platforms: 1 island platform
- Tracks: 2
- Connections: Metrobus: 17, 22, 95

Construction
- Parking: Garage (95 spaces)
- Accessible: Yes

Other information
- Station code: EHT

History
- Opened: December 17, 1984

Passengers
- 2011: 456,000 ▲17%

Services
Preceding station	Miami-Dade Transit	Following station
Allapattah toward Dadeland South	Green Line	Brownsville toward Palmetto
Allapattah toward Dadeland South	Orange Line	Miami Int'l Airport Terminus
Location

Earlington Heights station is a Metrorail station in the Liberty City neighborhood of Miami, Florida. This station is located at the intersection of Northwest 21st Avenue and the Airport Expressway (SR 112). The Metrorail Orange Line creation and extension of the metro to Miami International Airport (MIA) began construction from this rail station in May 2009, completed in July 2012. Passenger service between MIA, through Downtown Miami, and to the southern Miami suburb of Kendall opened in Summer 2012.

== Station layout ==
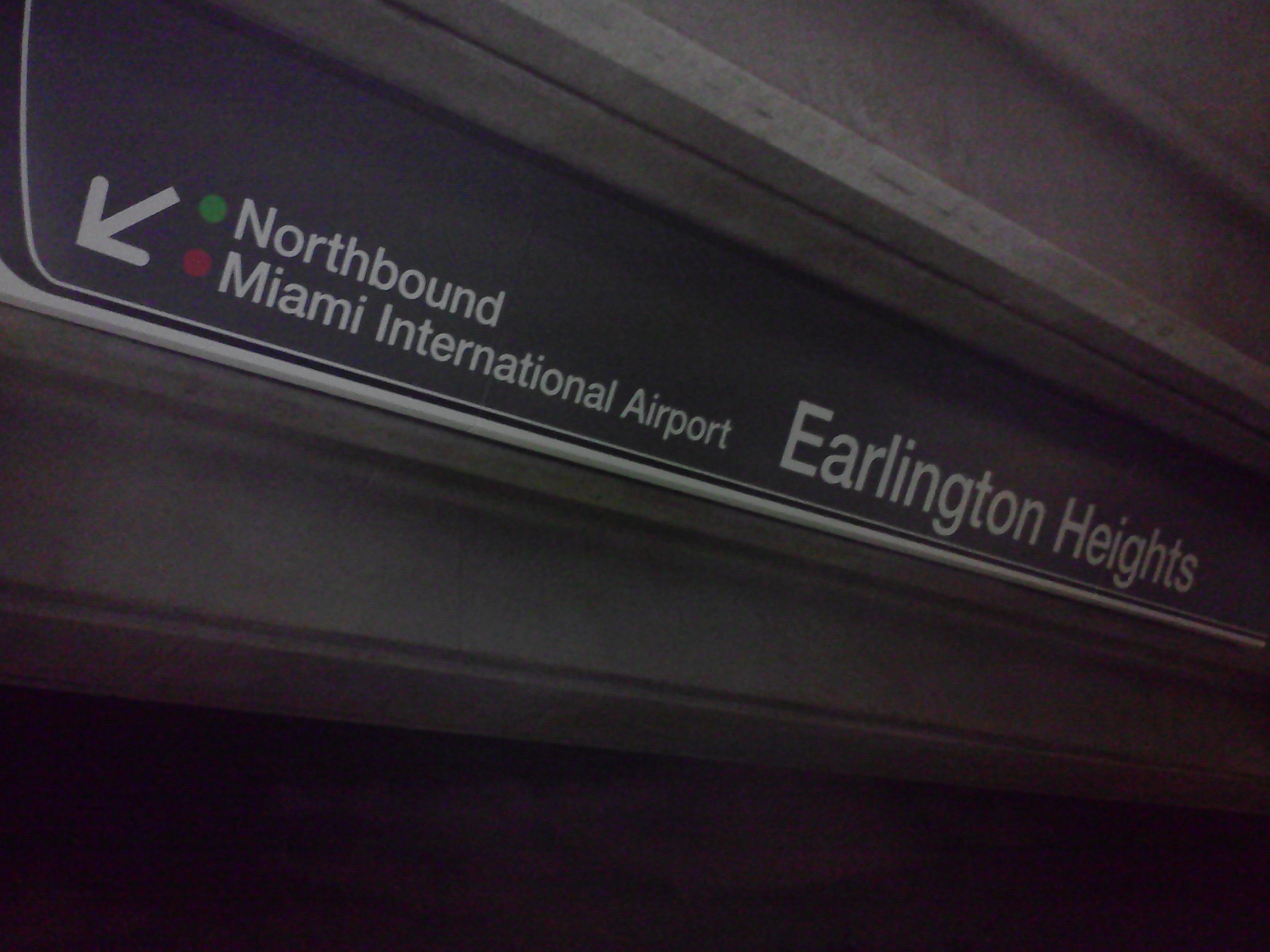
Signige indicating Orange Line transfer

The station has two tracks served by an island platform.

== Places of interest ==
- Miami International Airport (via the Orange Line)
- Brownsville
- Allapattah
- Historic Miami Jackson High School
- Earlington Heights Elementary
