= Florida State Road 112 =

Highway in Florida

State Road 112
- SR 112 highlighted in red

Route information
- Maintained by GMX, FDOT, and the city of Miami Beach
- Length: 9.804 mi (15.778 km)
- Existed: December 23, 1961–present

Major junctions
- West end: Miami International Airport
- US 27 in Hialeah; I-95 in Miami
- East end: SR A1A in Miami Beach

Location
- Country: United States
- State: Florida
- Counties: Miami-Dade

Highway system
- Florida State Highway System; Interstate; US; State; Former; Pre‑1945; Toll; Scenic
← SR 111	→ SR 113
← US 192	I-195	→ SR 196

State Road 112 (SR 112) is a 9.9-mile-long (15.9 km) east–west state highway connecting Miami International Airport in Miami to Miami Beach in the U.S. state of Florida. Between the airport and Interstate 95, it is locally known as the Airport Expressway (or the Airport Tollway), and is a controlled-access toll road between SR 9 and I-95. Between I-95 and Alton Road (SR 907A) in Miami Beach, SR 112 is signed only as Interstate 195 as it crosses Biscayne Bay by way of the Julia Tuttle Causeway. Between I-195 and its eastern terminus at Collins Avenue (SR A1A), the SR 112 signs are present but infrequent, and the road is locally maintained as West 41st Street.

== Route description ==
=== Airport Expressway ===
SR 112 begins in the west as the tolled 4.296-mile-long (6.914 km) Airport Expressway, maintained by the Greater Miami Expressway Agency (GMX). The expressway begins at the main entrance of Miami International Airport, at the intersection of NW 21st Street and SR 953 (Le Jeune Road), and heads north. For its first mile or so, the road runs parallel to SR 953 and an airport runway, with its lanes featuring a divided left-hand driving direction. About 0.5 miles (0.80 km) north of the southern terminus, SR 112 features an at-grade railroad crossing, near the eastern end of one of the airport's runways. The road swings to its main east-west orientation past the airport, with its lanes crossing to a normal driving direction just to the east of its partial interchange with SR 948, which also provides limited access to US 27.

After crossing NW 37th Avenue, the expressway passes through its first of two toll gantries, charging $0.33 for vehicles with SunPass transponders and $0.66 for the remaining Toll-by-Plate users. It also runs roughly parallel to the Metrorail Orange Line, crossing under it just west of NW 32nd Avenue. SR 112 then interchanges with SR 9 (NW 27th Avenue), and then NW 22nd Avenue half a mile later. From here, the expressway passes through the second toll gantry (at the location of the former toll plaza), charging the same rates as the first gantry. Near this gantry, SR 112 passes the southern side of the Earlington Heights Metrorail station, where the two lines of the Metrorail system merge, with both the expressway and Metrorail continuing to run parallel eastwards for another 1 mile (1.61 km) or so. Just before SR 112's partial interchange with SR 933 (NW 12th Avenue), the Metrorail tracks cross over the expressway as they curve southwards. About 0.5 miles (0.80 km) later, the expressway terminates at a stack interchange with I-95, known as the 36th Street Interchange.

=== Interstate 195 ===
Interstate 195
- Location: Miami to Miami Beach
- Length: 4.42 mi (7.11 km)
- Existed: 1961–present

Julia Tuttle Causeway
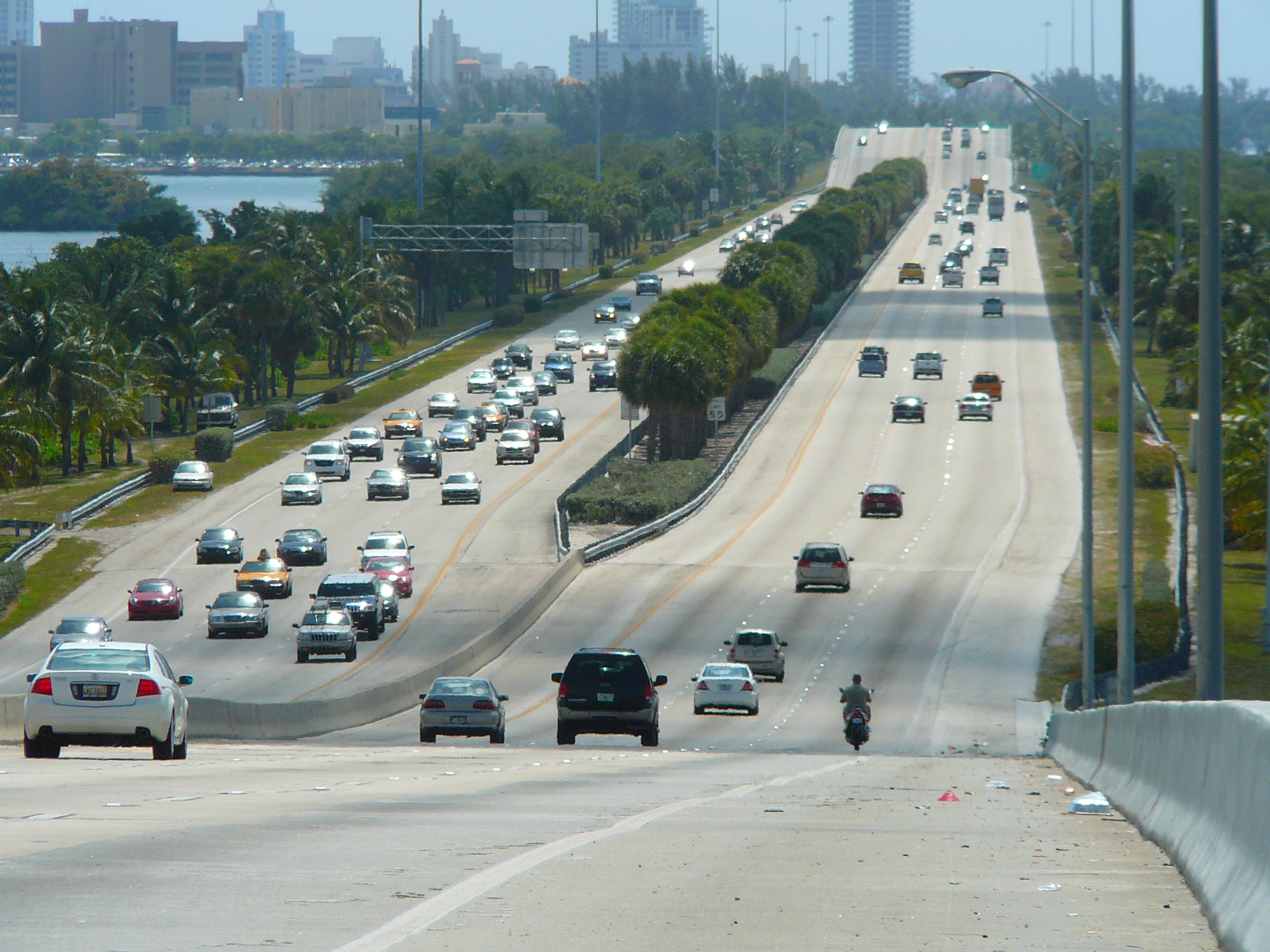
- The Julia Tuttle Causeway eastbound connecting Midtown Miami with Miami Beach
- Carries: 6 lanes of I-195 / SR 112
- Crosses: Biscayne Bay
- Locale: Miami

Characteristics
- Design: Beam, fill causeway
- Material: Slabs and girders
- Total length: 2.5 miles (4.0 km)
- Longest span: 0.4 miles (0.64 km)
- Clearance above: 68 feet (21 m)

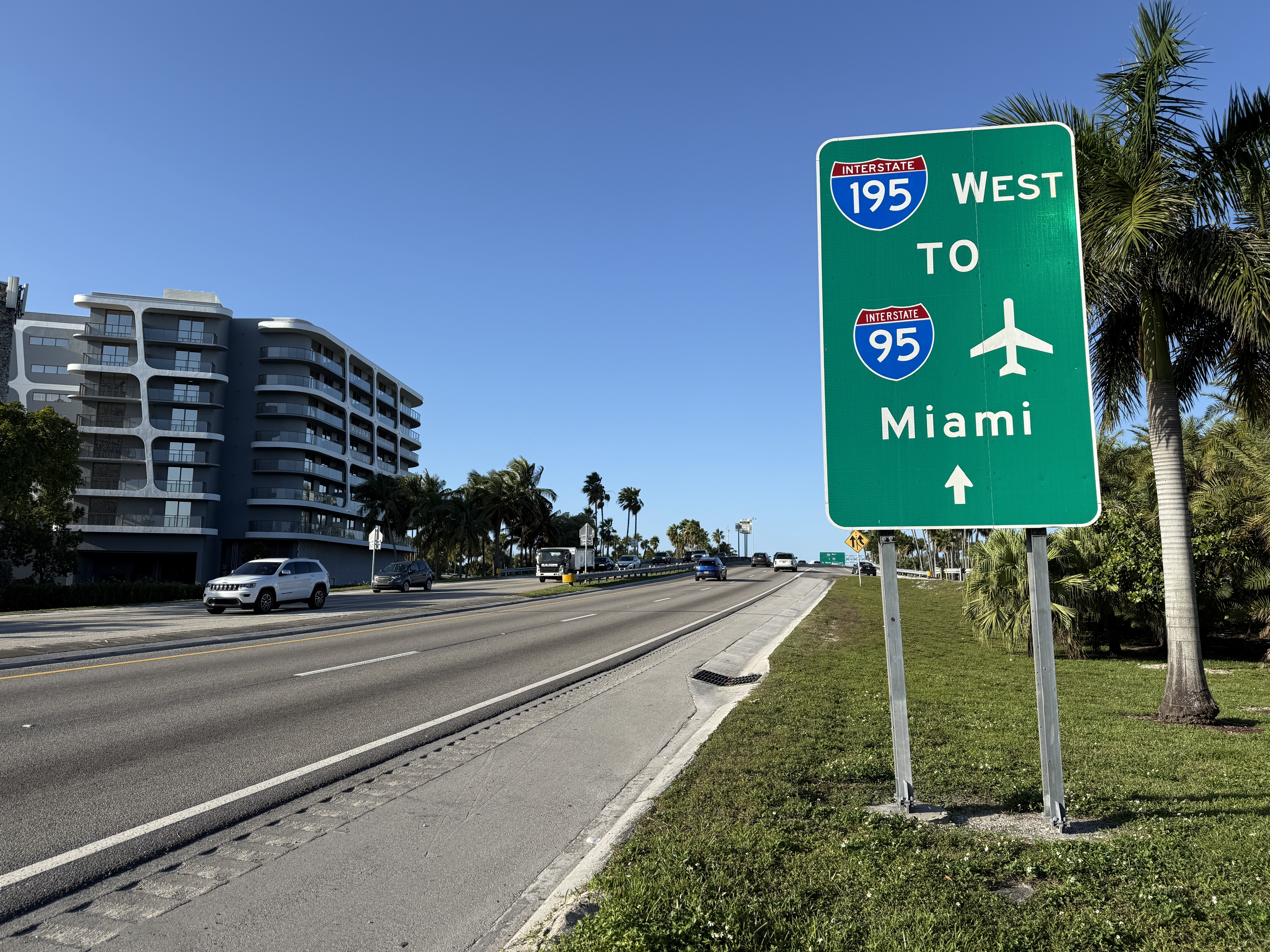
I-195 westbound past eastern terminus at SR 112 and SR 907A in Miami Beach

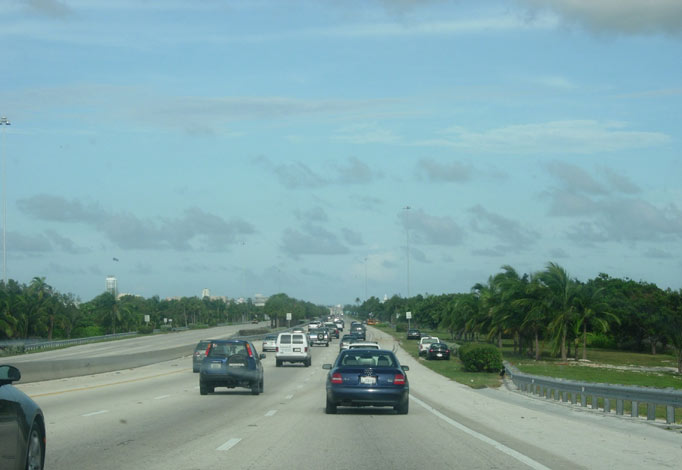
I-195 eastbound toward Miami Beach

The 4.708-mile-long (7.577 km) section of SR 112 connecting I-95 in the west with Miami Beach in the east is also designated and signed as Interstate 195 (I-195), with SR 112 becoming an unsigned highway.

I-195 begins at the I-95 and SR 112 interchange, continuing east from the Airport Expressway as a non-tolled expressway, with interchanges at Miami Avenue and Biscayne Boulevard (US 1) before traveling over the Julia Tuttle Causeway, named after Miami founder Julia Tuttle, where the Interstate crosses Biscayne Bay. At the eastern end of the causeway in Miami Beach, it has an interchange with SR 907 before terminating at the intersection of Alton Road (SR 907A).

As part of a pilot program, the Florida Department of Transportation (FDOT) painted the shoulders as bike lanes east of US 1. Pedestrians are still prohibited.

=== West 41st Street ===
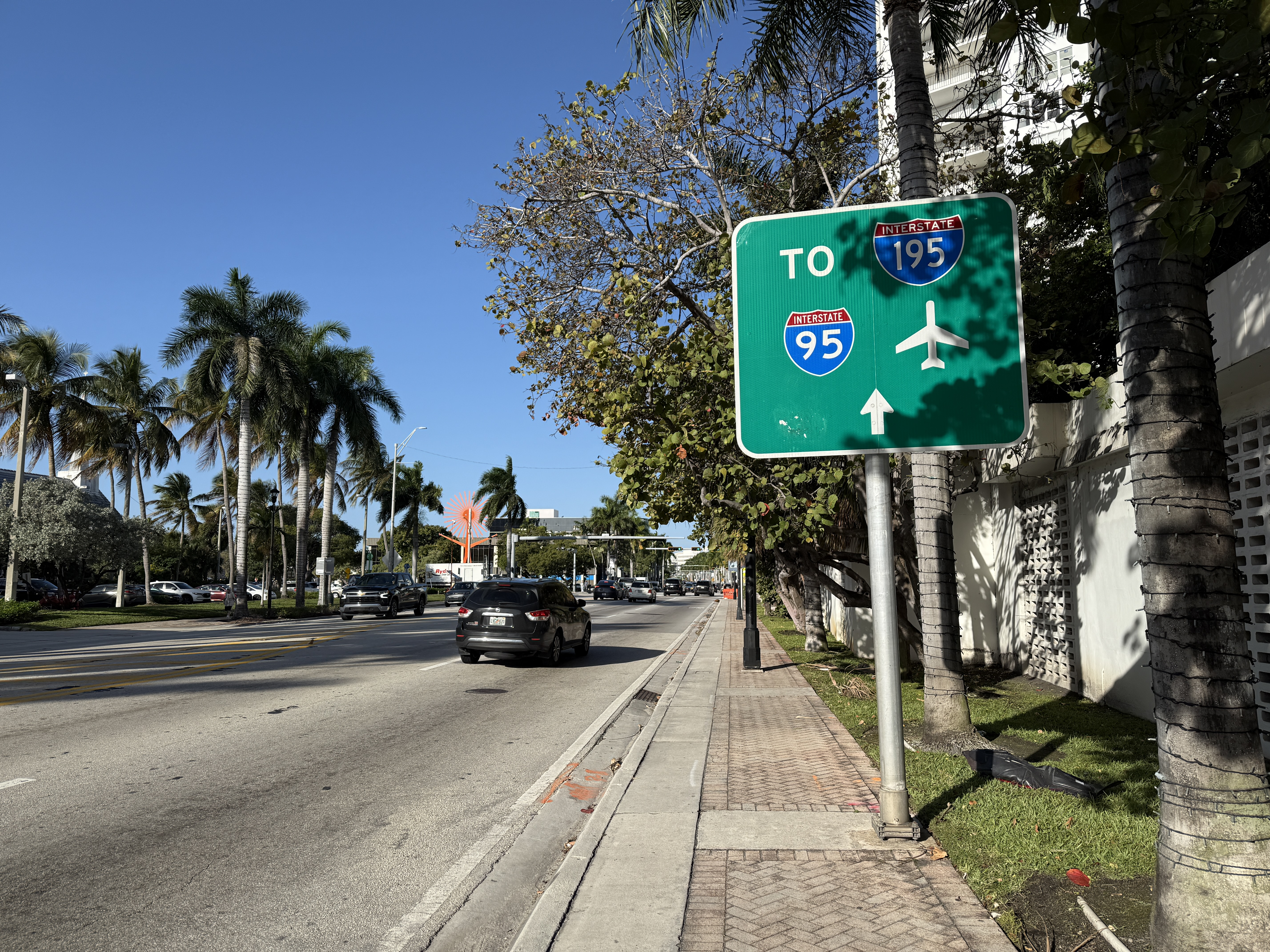
SR 112 westbound past SR A1A in Miami Beach

East of Alton Road, SR 112 continues as the palm-lined West 41st Street (also known as Arthur Godfrey Road, named after broadcaster and entertainer Arthur Godfrey), a 0.82-mile-long (1.32 km) four-lane surface road. It passes through the southern end of Nautilus, past shops and low-rise office buildings, crossing the Biscayne Waterway before passing along the southern edge of North Beach Elementary School. Continuing past more shops and a hotel, SR 112 crosses the Intracoastal Waterway before immediately meeting the southbound half of SR A1A. Past here, the road becomes one lane in each direction and meets the northbound half of SR A1A one block later, terminating amidst the high-rises of Mid-Beach. West 41st Street continues on a short distance into a cul-de-sac.

== Tolls ==
Tolls on the Airport Expressway are all electronic, meaning there are no cash transactions. Payment is done either via SunPass transponders or via toll-by-plate billing, the latter of which charges double of the former. Two toll gantries are located along the expressway portion of the road, each charging $0.33 for SunPass users and $0.66 for Toll-by-Plate. As of May 6, 2026, it costs $0.66 to travel the entire expressway portion via SunPass (and $1.32 via Toll-by-Plate). All motorists are charged at least one toll for using the road; there are no "free sections" as existed prior to the electronic toll conversion in 2014.

== History ==
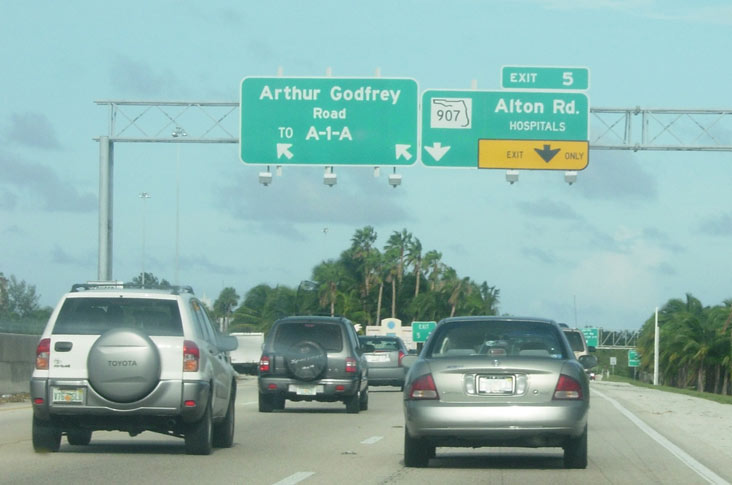
Eastern terminus of I-195 at exit 5

Construction of SR 112 began in 1959, and the expressway was opened to traffic on December 23, 1961 (six months after the Palmetto Expressway, SR 826). Its initial name was the 36th Street Tollway, but use of the name eventually faded in favor of the more popular "Airport Expressway". Initially the toll road had its western terminus at the congested intersection with LeJeune Road (SR 953), Northwest 36th Street (SR 48), and Okeechobee Road (US 27 / SR 25) just east of the airport. It wasn't until 1990 when SR 112 was extended southward and westward onto the airport property, terminating at the main entrance.

The numbering of SR 112 is an anomaly in the current grid-based system. The road was assigned its number while it was in its planning stages; it retained the number as FDOT made widespread changes in the numbering of State Roads in southeastern Florida in the 1970s and early 1980s.

On November 15, 2014, the Airport Expressway became an all electronic toll road, no longer collecting cash, and the only ways to pay are either by the SunPass transponders or billing by the toll-by-plate program, at double the cost. This also eliminated all "free movement" sections of the tolled section of SR 112, and restored tolls westbound, which had been removed in March 1984. This change was first announced in 2010, and along with the nearby Dolphin Expressway, SR 112 was the last of the MDX expressways to be converted to open road tolling.

=== Interstate 195 Spur ===
On December 23, 1961, three signed roads along the route of SR 112 were opened: the 36th Street Tollway, now the Airport Expressway, Interstate 195, and Interstate 195 Spur along with a stretch of I-95 in Miami. I-195 Spur was the surface portion of the east–west state road along West 41st Street in Miami Beach, connecting I-195 and SR A1A east of the causeway. The I-195 Spur signs disappeared from the road shortly after the designation was decommissioned by the newly formed United States Department of Transportation in the late 1960s, and is now signed solely (but scarcely) as SR 112.

== In popular culture ==
Famously, in early 1975, the rhythm of their car on the Julia Tuttle Causeway was the inspiration for the Bee Gees's song "Jive Talkin'".

== Future ==
While repeated attempts to secure funding for extending SR 112 along SR 948 to the Palmetto Expressway and the Homestead Extension of Florida's Turnpike have failed, the Florida Department of Transportation is constructing a connector between the Dolphin Expressway and the Airport Expressway as part of a massive project (the Miami Intermodal Center) tying together expressways, rail lines, and the airport. It remains to be seen if the connector will have its own FDOT designation or if the SR 112 will be extended over it to connect the Miami area's two primary east–west expressways.

== Major intersections ==
The entire route is in Miami-Dade County.

Location	mi	km	Exit	Destinations	Notes
Miami–Miami Springs line	0.000	0.000		Miami International Airport	
Miami Springs	0.906	1.458		SR 953 south (Le Jeune Road) – Rental Car Center, Cell Phone Lot	Westbound exit and eastbound entrance
Miami Springs	0.941	1.514		Le Jeune Road (SR 953 north) / NW 36th Street (SR 948 west)	Westbound exit and eastbound entrance
Miami Canal	1.000	1.609	Bridge		
Hialeah	1.251	2.013		US 27 north (Okeechobee Road / SR 25) – Tri-Rail	Westbound exit and eastbound entrance
Hialeah–Brownsville line				Northwest 37th Avenue	Proposed partial interchange to be constructed in FY 2028
Brownsville	1.600	2.575	Toll gantry		
Brownsville	2.464	3.965		SR 9 (Northwest 27th Avenue)	Access via local roads
Brownsville	3.048	4.905		Northwest 22nd Avenue – Metrorail	
Miami	3.719	5.985		Northwest 17th Avenue	Westbound exit only
Miami	3.848	6.193	Toll gantry		
Miami	3.980	6.405		Northwest 12th Avenue (SR 933) – MDC Medical Campus	Eastbound exit only
Miami	4.132	6.650	East end of GMX maintenance; west end of FDOT maintenance		
Miami	4.296	6.914	1	I-95 (SR 9A) – Downtown Miami, Fort Lauderdale, Orlando I-195 begins	Western terminus of I-195; exit 4 on I-95 (unsigned SR 9A)
Miami	4.296	6.914		I-95 Express north	Eastbound exit and westbound entrance
Miami	4.974	8.005	2A	North Miami Avenue	Eastbound exit and westbound entrance
Miami	5.347	8.605	2B	US 1 (Biscayne Boulevard / SR 5)	
Biscayne Bay (Intracoastal Waterway)	5.947– 7.986	9.571– 12.852	Julia Tuttle Causeway		
Miami Beach	8.566	13.786	5	SR 907 (Alton Road) – Miami Beach, Convention Center	Eastbound exit and westbound entrance
Miami Beach	9.004	14.491	Eastern end of freeway section		
Miami Beach	9.004	14.491		Alton Road (SR 907A) I-195 ends	Eastern terminus of I-195
Miami Beach	9.204	14.812	Bridge over the Biscayne Waterway		
Miami Beach	9.604	15.456	Bridge over the Intracoastal Waterway		
Miami Beach	9.704	15.617		SR A1A south (Indian Creek Drive)	One-way designation southbound; alt route to SR A1A north
Miami Beach	9.804	15.778		SR A1A north (Collins Avenue)	One-way northbound
1.000 mi = 1.609 km; 1.000 km = 0.621 mi: Concurrency terminus; Electronic toll collection; Incomplete access

== See also ==
- Jive Talkin'
- Julia Tuttle Causeway sex offender colony
