= Georgette's Tea Room House =

Former boarding house

Coordinates: 25.8207°N 80.2394°W

Georgette’s Tea Room House (also referred to as Georgette’s Tea House and Georgette’s Tea Room) is a former boarding house in Brownsville, Miami, Florida, opened in 1940 by Georgette Scott Campbell. It catered to African American patrons during segregation in the American South. It would serve breakfast, lunch, tea and boarding to visitors and guests. It is located in the Brownsville section of the Miami metropolitan area of South Florida.

The tea room received a local historic designation in 1990 and was listed on the National Register of Historic Places in 2026. The tea room is one of the properties owned by Bethany Seventh-day Adventist Church in Brownsville, Miami. Since 2023, the church has been trying to raise money to restore the tea room house.

== Notable guests ==
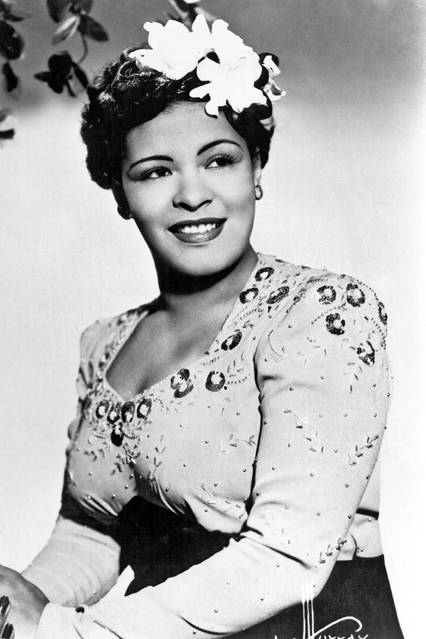
Singer Billie Holiday

Due to segregation laws many African-Americans were not allowed to stay at most hotels. This included famous African-American performers. Even when they were paid to perform at those hotels they were often not allowed to stay at them.

- Billie Holiday stayed at Georgette's Tea Room House during her performances in the 1940s because she was not allowed to stay in the hotels she performed at.
- Nat King Cole stayed at Georgette's Tea Room House while performing in Miami.
