= Metrorail (Miami-Dade County) =

Rapid transit rail system in Miami, Florida

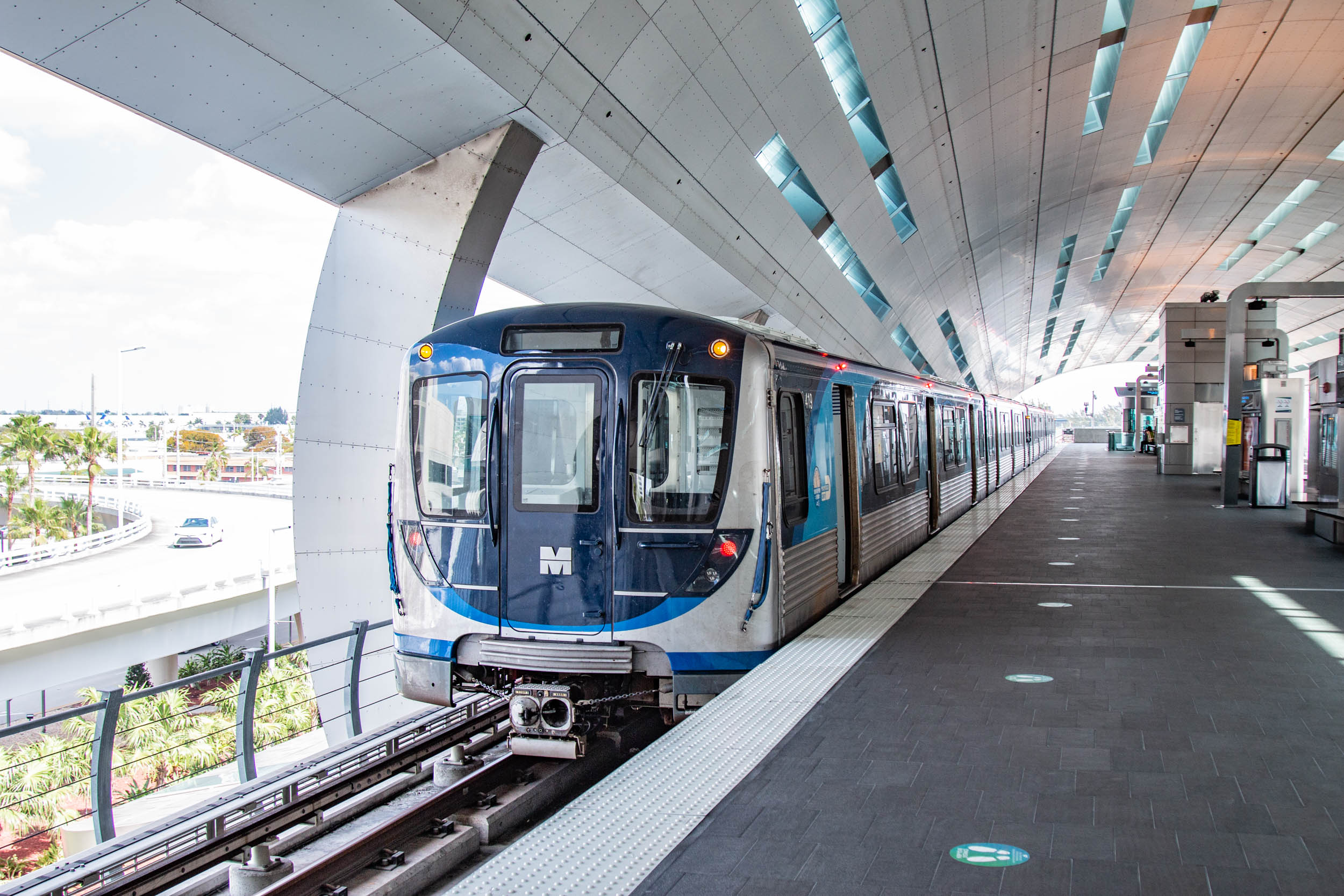
- A northbound Orange Line train arriving at Miami International Airport

Overview
- Owner: Miami-Dade Transit
- Locale: Miami-Dade County, Florida, U.S.
- Transit type: Rapid transit
- Number of lines: 2
- Number of stations: 23
- Daily ridership: 50,100 (weekdays, Q2 2026)
- Annual ridership: 14,971,300 (2025)
- Chief executive: Stacy L. Miller, P.E.
- Website: Official website

Operation
- Began operation: May 20, 1984; 42 years ago
- Train length: 4 or 6 cars
- Headway: 10 minutes (peak); 15–30 minutes (off-peak); 20–30 minutes (weekends)

Technical
- System length: 24.4 mi (39.3 km)
- Track gauge: 4 ft 8 1/2 in (1,435 mm) standard gauge
- Electrification: Third rail, 750 V DC
- Average speed: 31 mph (50 km/h)
- Top speed: 58 mph (93 km/h)
System map

Metrorail is a rapid transit system in Miami and Miami-Dade County in the U.S. state of Florida. It is operated by Miami-Dade Transit (MDT), a departmental agency of Miami-Dade County. Opened in 1984, it is Florida's only rapid transit metro system and consists of two lines and 23 stations over 24.4 miles (39.3 km) of standard gauge track.

Metrorail serves central Miami and surrounding areas, including Miami International Airport, the Health District, Downtown Miami, and Brickell, as well as the northern communities of Hialeah and Medley. To the south, service extends through The Roads, Coconut Grove, Coral Gables, and South Miami to Dadeland in Kendall. The system connects to the Metromover in Downtown Miami and to Tri-Rail and Brightline services. Metrobus routes serve all stations. In 2025, the system recorded 14,971,300 trips, with an average of 50,100 weekday riders as of the second quarter of 2026.

== History ==
=== Construction ===
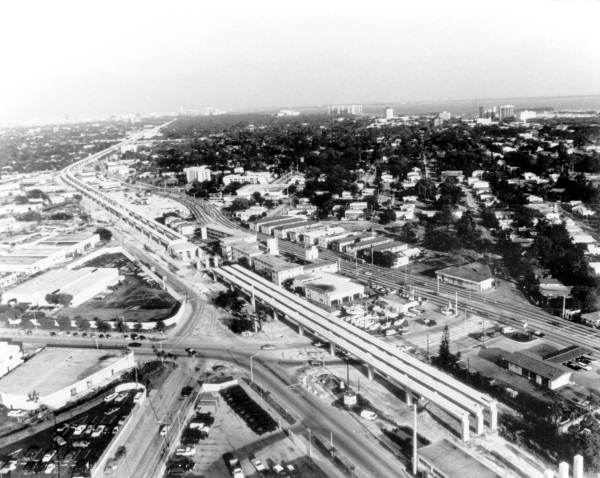
Metrorail viaduct under construction at Douglas Road in Coral Gables during the early 1980s

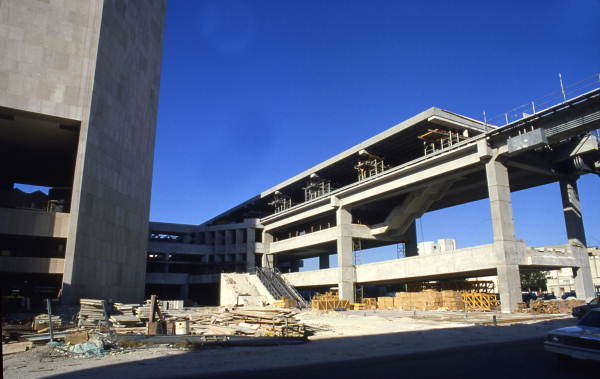
Construction of Government Center (1984)

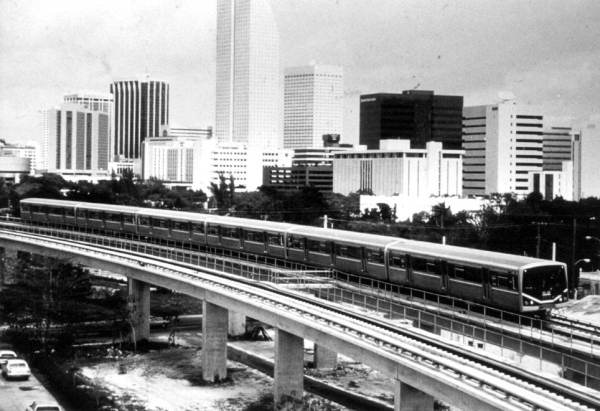
Early photo of a northbound Metro train approaching Brickell

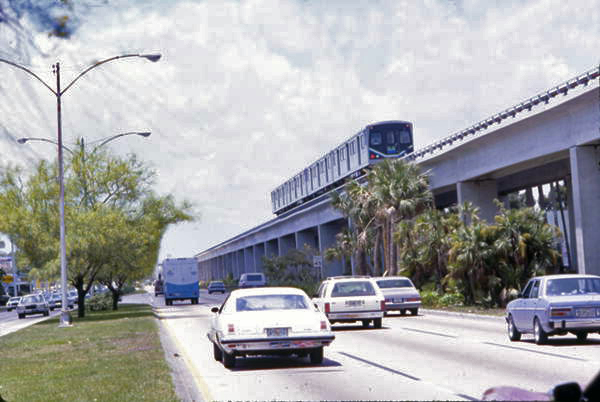
Northbound Metrorail traveling above South Dixie Highway

In 1964 the Miami Urban Area Transportation Study was initiated by the Dade County metropolitan planning organization. It was completed in 1971 and recommended the construction for a rapid transit system for Greater Miami. Having experienced a prolonged post-World War II population boom, metropolitan Dade County's permanent population rose by 35% to nearly 1.3 million residents within a decade, among the fastest population growth rates in the United States. Within a year of the study, county residents approved a $132.5 million ($1019.8 million, adjusted for current inflation) bond dedicated to transit, with additional funding approved by the Florida Legislature for transit which, up until that time, operated solely on fare revenue. In 1976, with preliminary engineering completed for the system, the Federal Transit Administration (FTA, then, the Urban Mass Transit Administration) committed 80% of the costs for the first stage of rapid transit system, with the county and state incurring the remaining cost. In the end the system cost over a billion dollars.

In April 1979, the Interstate Commerce Commission ratified an agreement between the Florida East Coast Railway and Dade County to transfer the right-of-way along US 1 to Miami-Dade Transit, then named the Metro Transit Agency. Groundbreaking for the system the county commission voted to be named "Metrorail" (working name was DART - Dade Area Rapid Transit) took place at the site of what would become University station in June. Construction began in December 1980 with placing of a double-tee guideway girder near the University of Miami. The entire original 21 mi (34 km) line contained 2,704 girders, constructed at a cost of $55,887,830. In June 1983, the first segment of Metrorail, 10 stations from Dadeland South to Overtown (now "Historic Overtown/Lyric Theatre") was completed with the construction of the Miami River Bridge. Revenue operation commenced on May 20, 1984, with 125,000 taking the free first-day service from Pinecrest/Dadeland to Overtown.

In 1984 Rockne Krebs created an urban-scale neon sculpture multicolored light installation called The Miami Line that stretches 1,540 feet (470 m) across the Metrorail bridge over the Miami River. Additional segments between Earlington Heights and Okeechobee opened between December 1984 and May 1985. In March 1989, a temporary station was opened to provide a connection to the newly opened Tri-Rail commuter rail line, with the now permanent station officially opening in June. Preliminary engineering for a rapid transit extension to the Palmetto Expressway began in 1996 with Palmetto station opening in May 2003. As far as operational costs, revenues expected for 2006 were $17.15 million, while expenses budgeted for 2006 were $41.29 million. These historic figures became the last the Miami Dade Transit Authority ever disclosed, and are the figures still displayed on today's Miami-Dade Transit webpage as of January 2012.

With the area having a generally low density and lacking transit-oriented development, the Metrorail was designed as a park and ride system, with the idea being that suburban residents would drive to the stations, then commute the rest of the way into the city. Nearly all of the stations outside of downtown Miami have parking facilities, except Tri-Rail station. Several have large parking garages, such as Dadeland North and South stations, located at the southern end of the system, which combined have space for over 3,000 cars. Earlington Heights, located just northwest of Downtown and adjacent to Interstate 95 and the Airport Expressway, has a large garage that was formerly dedicated to Metrorail riders. However, that is now used by the county due to the station's low ridership, with only 95 vehicle spaces currently available. The successful Dadeland garages are at or over capacity, with two of Metrorail's proposed extensions, the West Kendall Corridor and South Link, intended to help alleviate them. The two northernmost stations, which are located near the Palmetto Expressway, Palmetto and Okeechobee, appeal to Broward County commuters with nearly 2,000 combined spaces. Additionally, the proposed North Corridor to the Broward/Miami-Dade county line would have included five park and ride facilities totaling 2,650 spaces. In the late 1990s, the plan was to potentially even continue the Metrorail line into Broward County along 27th Avenue (University Drive), ending at Broward Boulevard near Broward Mall in Plantation.

=== Ridership growth and transit tax ===
External videos
- Summer of '84: Tracking Metrorail's First Day

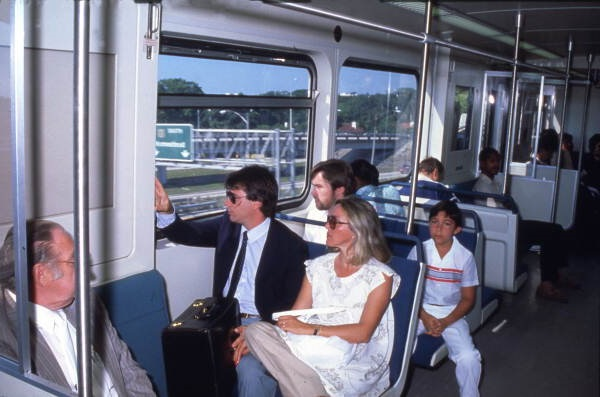
Passengers aboard Metrorail during the mid-1980s

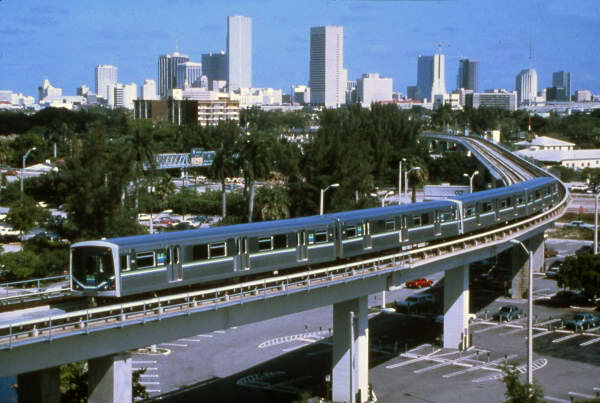
Southbound Metrorail train heading to Culmer during the late 1980s

After the initial segment of the single Green Line opened, Metrorail saw less than 10,000 riders per day. This increased to 15,000 after the rest of the line and stations opened in late 1984 and 1985. After running out of money due to cost overruns, the originally planned to be 50 miles (80 km) system consisting of several lines was never completed, and lack of transit-oriented development along the single line led to the system being regarded as a boondoggle. President Ronald Reagan commented that, given the low number of riders, it would have been cheaper to buy them all a limousine than the billion dollar cost of building and subsidizing the system. The federal subsidy was approximately $800 million of the $1.02 billion used to fund the line. Ridership was up to 15,000 after the rest of the line had opened. Ridership continued to grow in the late 1980s, with an edge city-like area known as Dadeland in suburban Kendall growing up around the southern terminus of the line at Dadeland North and Dadeland South stations. Consequently, the southern nine stations from Kendall to Downtown Miami have higher ridership than the northern end. This part of the system also has a higher average speed, having fewer curves and long distances between stations as it follows the congested South Dixie Highway. During the 1990s, ridership growth was relatively stagnant, however, and Metrorail remained the subject of criticism. At this time, ridership was up to about 50,000 per day, about a quarter of the original ridership estimate.

Although the original referendum for a one-cent transit sales tax increase had failed in 1999, a half-cent sales surtax (Charter County Transit System Surtax) increase was passed by a two-to-one margin by Miami-Dade County voters in November 2002, with the intention being for the revenue to go fully towards the funding of new transit lines, including the Metrorail Orange Line, new bus routes, and increased service. Metrorail briefly ran a 24-hour hourly service from 12am to 5am and rush hour peak headways were reduced to 6 minutes, but the idea of the transit tax was sold to voters as being able to fund up to 88.9 miles (143.1 km) of additional Metrorail track by the 2030 long range plan, beginning with a completion of an Orange Line north corridor and east–west line by 2016. As it turned out, Miami-Dade Transit was running a deficit and used some of the tax to close the books, as well as using some to hire new staff, pay rent, and buy furniture for their new headquarters at the Historic Overtown/Lyric Theatre station. By the late 2000s recession, it was realized that only the 2.4-mile (3.9 km) AirportLink of the Orange Line would be funded, and after service cuts in 2008, Metrorail was running fewer trains than before the tax was passed. In response to all this, The Miami Herald published a comprehensive exposé titled "Taken For A Ride, How the transit tax went off track", detailing all of the promises that were not kept as well as what money was misspent and how. Despite the service cuts, due to the rise in energy prices and ever-increasing congestion, as well as a significant amount of residential development in the downtown area, ridership continued to grow during the 2000s, averaging well over 60,000 weekday riders throughout 2011. However, this is still short of the 1985 estimate of 75,000 daily riders that were expected by the end of that year. The transit tax also funded improvements to the adjoining Metromover system, including removal of the 25 cent fare, with the idea that higher ridership on the system would lead to higher Metrorail ridership, as well as the realization that the cost of fare collection exceeded fare revenue.

=== Orange Line and Airport extension ===
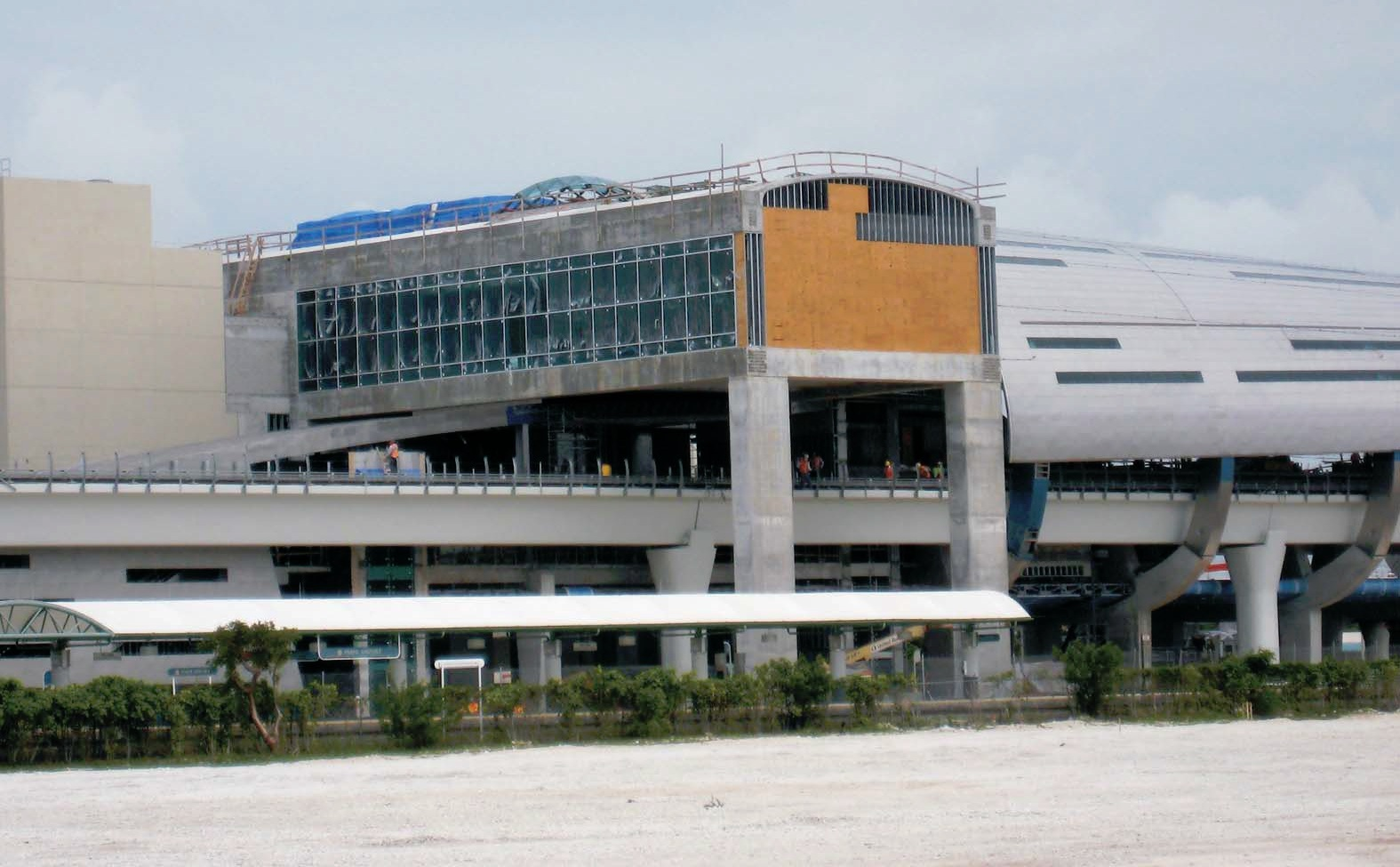
Construction on the now complete Miami International Airport station as of June 2011

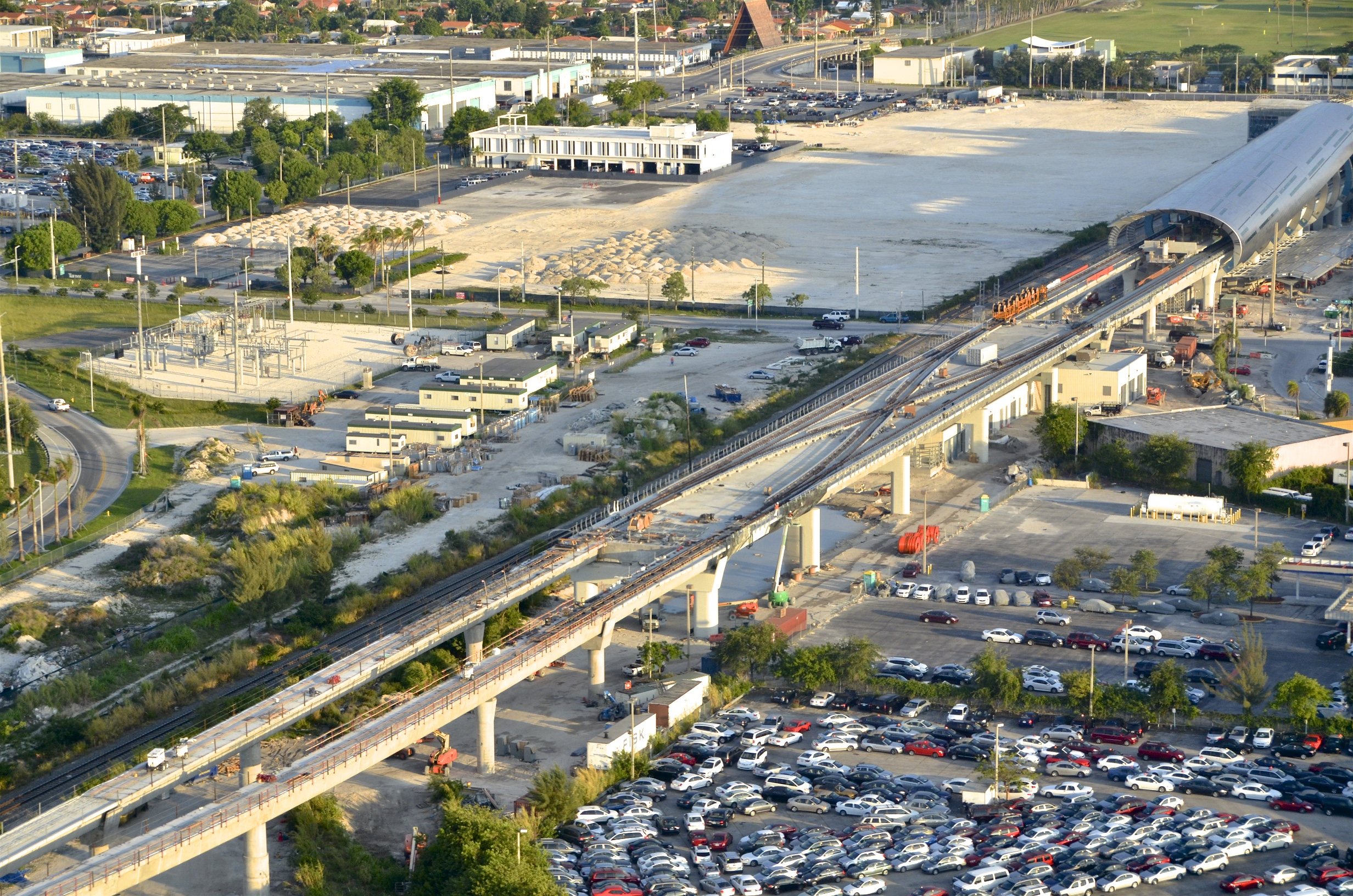
Construction of elevated track leading to Miami International Airport May 2011.

The original Metrorail line was initially planned to be built to the airport, but due to political pressure and lobbying was instead directed to its current alignment around the airport and to Hialeah. In May 2009, Miami-Dade County broke ground on the AirportLink project, a 2.4-mile (3.9 km) extension of Metrorail connecting the existing Earlington Heights station to the Miami Intermodal Center (MIC), located adjacent to Miami International Airport's rental car center. The AirportLink was considered a vital component of the People's Transportation Plan (PTP), which Miami-Dade voters approved in 2002. The bulk of the funding for the $506 million project came from the plan's half-penny tax, with the Florida Department of Transportation (FDOT) contributing $101.3 million. Construction commenced in May 2009, and service on the new Orange Line began on July 28, 2012, with the project completed on time and under budget. At the MIC, the Orange Line connects to Tri-Rail, Greyhound intercity buses, and the MIA Mover, the airport's people mover.

=== Transit-oriented development ===
In addition to private development, several joint-development affordable housing projects have recently been constructed along the Metrorail line with the intent of increasing ridership through transit-oriented development. These projects include Santa Clara apartments, Brownsville Transit Village, and The Beacon, which is located near Historic Overtown/Lyric Theater station in Downtown Miami. The headquarters of Miami-Dade Transit, also located next to Historic Overtown/Lyric Theater station, is known as the Overtown Transit Village. Brownsville Transit Village, opening in March 2012, was visited by the administrator of the Environmental Protection Agency (EPA), Lisa P. Jackson, on January 5, 2012, to tour the 490-unit development, which will save an estimated five million gallons of water and $50,000 annually in utility bills due to environmentally sustainable plumbing fixtures. Nonetheless, by 2016, Brownsville and Santa Clara were still the lowest ridership stations, the only ones to regularly post ridership numbers below 1,000 daily. In general, stations to the north of UHealth–Jackson see much lower ridership, on average one-third of stations from UHealth–Jackson south. They are mostly in industrial areas with low population density and little development, as well as stagnant or declining populations, such as Gladeview and Brownsville. Additionally, stations to the north of Earlington Heights are only served by one line, giving them much longer headways.

In 2015, plans for a Miami MLS stadium as well as a possible joint University of Miami football stadium cited as a necessity to be in or near Miami's urban core with a transit-oriented location.. The answer to this search became the now-closed Melreese Golf Course in Grapeland Heights.

The Miami Intermodal Center is located near Nu Stadium at Miami Freedom Park, the soccer stadium and retail complex opening in 2026 built on the former Melreese site. The Intermodal Center is located on the north side of the canal that separates the stadium site from the airport. A footbridge over the Tamiami Canal is planned to connect the station with the stadium complex.

=== Downtown Express ===
In December 2015, Miami-Dade Transit began the Downtown Express, a monthlong pilot program for express service between key stations during rush hours. During morning rush, many stations are skipped from the north and south en route to downtown, and in the afternoon, stations are skipped as the trains leave downtown. Hence, the Downtown Express only stopped at Dadeland South, Dadeland North, Brickell, and Government Center stations. The service was well received, though it only saved a few minutes' time, partially due to the headway limitations with a system only having two tracks. The service continued past the end of the pilot program, but would ultimately be eliminated in March 2020 as a result of the COVID-19 pandemic.

== Trackage ==
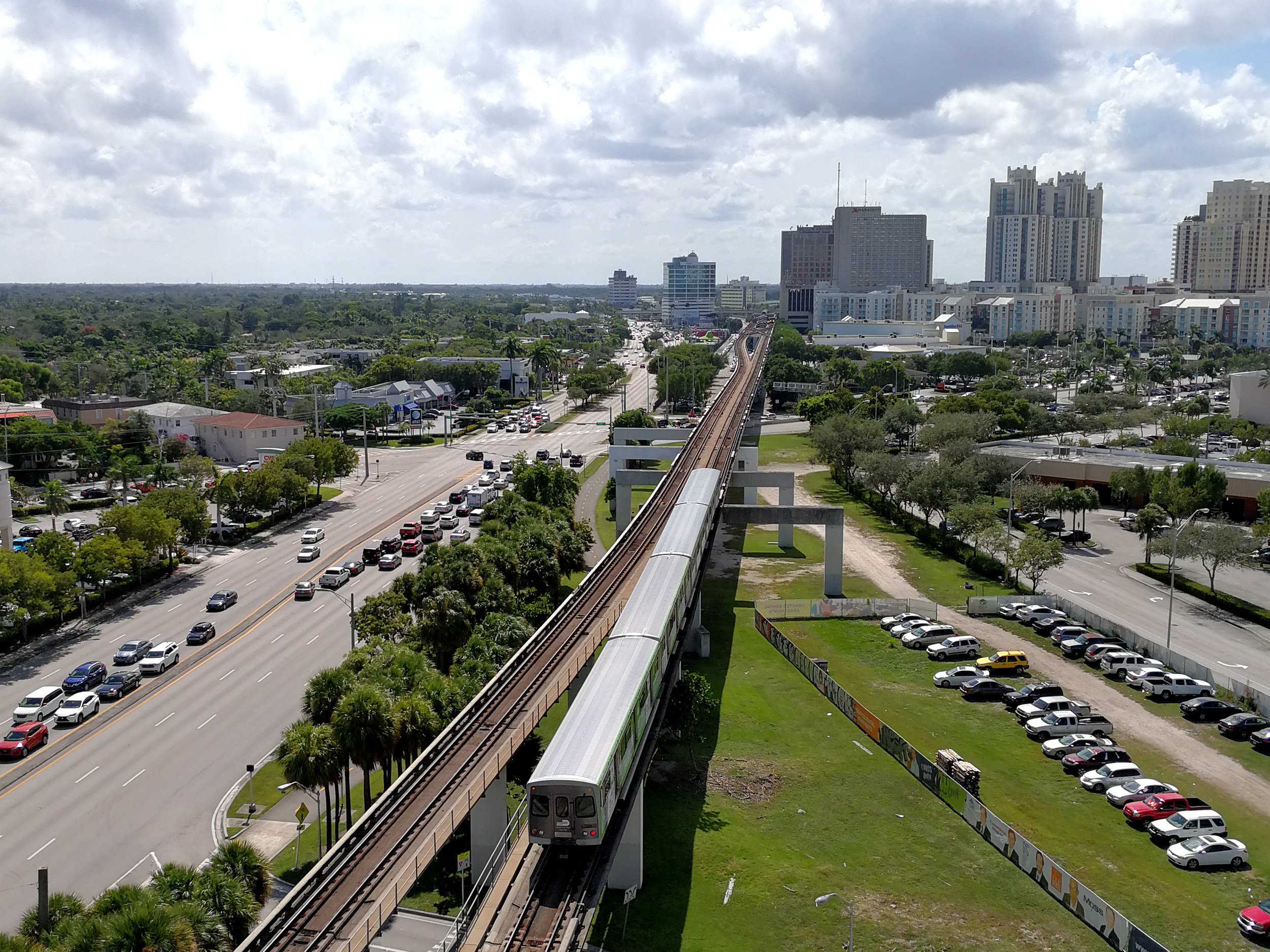
Metrorail departing Dadeland North station and heading towards Dadeland South station

Metrorail runs from the northwest in Medley through Hialeah, into the city of Miami, the downtown area, through Coral Gables and South Miami, and ending in southwest Miami-Dade at Dadeland Mall. There are 23 accessible Metrorail stations, one about every 1.25 mi (2.012 km). Metrorail connects to the Metromover system at Government Center and Brickell stations and to South Florida's Tri-Rail suburban commuter rail system at the Tri-Rail station (see below).

Since completion of the Airport Link in 2012, Metrorail increased its service frequency to peak headways of three and a half to five minutes on the shared portion of the line from Dadeland South to Earlington Heights.

Along with the Metrorail system, the tracks are mostly elevated. The three sections that are not are under I-95 between Vizcaya and Brickell stations, under I-95 just east of Culmer station, and the northern end of the line from just east of the Palmetto Expressway heading west into the Palmetto station and tail track. In each of these cases, the tracks ride on the ground level for a brief amount of time. The platform at each Metrorail station is long enough to accommodate six-car-long trains; the Dadeland North, Earlington Heights, and Government Center station platforms are long enough to accommodate eight-car-long trains. In-service trains are usually either four or six cars long; in the evening it is not uncommon for Miami-Dade Transit to link two out-of-service trains together before returning them to Lehman Yard. Trains are stored at the Lehman Yard just west of Okeechobee station. There are extra tracks and a new test track, known as the Lehman Center Test Track, built at the Lehman Yard.

== Rolling stock ==
=== Current fleet ===
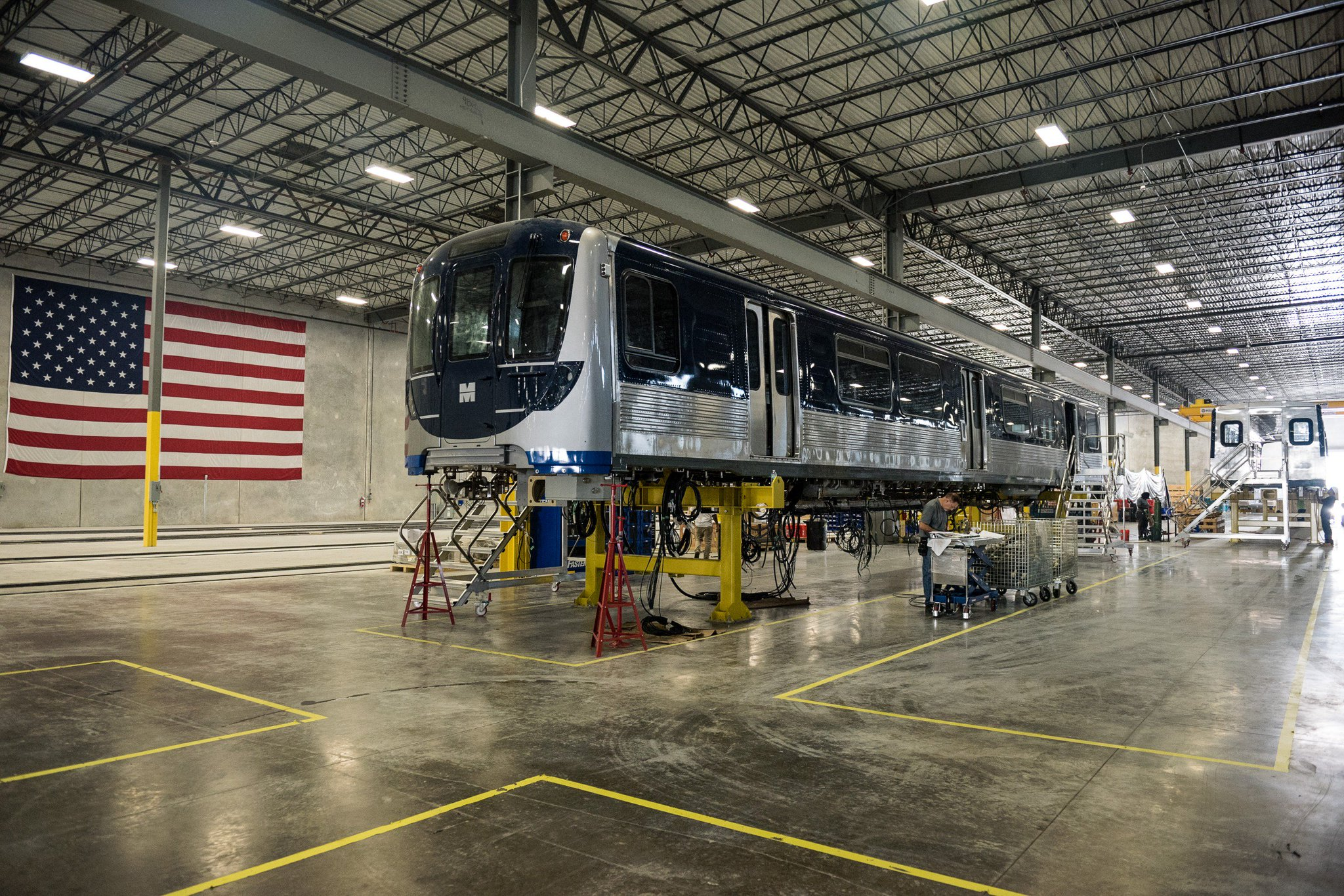
A new Metrorail car at a press event at the Hitachi Rail facility in Medley (2016)

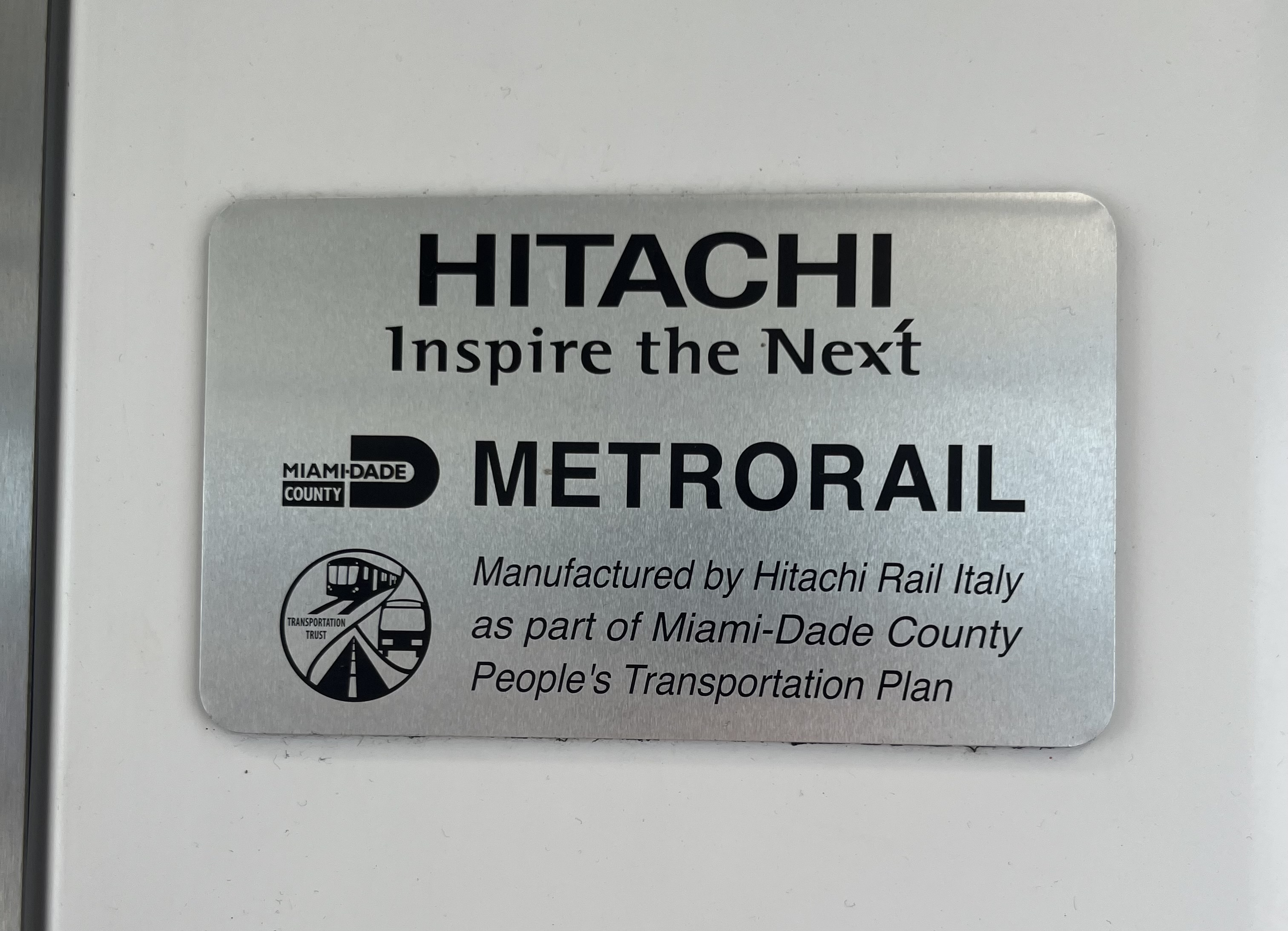
Builders plate of the Hitachi-built cars

External videos
- New Metrorail Hitachi Train Rollout
- New Era - Metrorail Fleet Replacement

Miami-Dade Metrorail currently uses 136 heavy-rail cars built by Hitachi Rail Italy, the first of which entered service in December 2017. The cars were assembled in a custom facility in Medley, Florida, and are semi-permanently coupled into married pairs and typically formed into 4 or 6-car trains. Onboard amenities include free Wi-Fi, interior bicycle racks, automated announcement, digital signs, and high-efficiency air conditioning units.

Planning for the new fleet began after voters approved a half-penny surtax in 2002, with the intention of funding new railcars. Initial proposals to refurbish the existing fleet were abandoned after a 2008 cost-benefit analysis found that refurbishment would cost as much as purchasing new cars. In 2011, Miami-Dade issued an RFP for replacement cars, with bids submitted by AnsaldoBreda and CAF. CAF filed a lawsuit challenging the selection of AnsaldoBreda due to the company’s proposal to assemble vehicles locally, which could have affected federal funding eligibility.

After reevaluation, Miami-Dade reaffirmed its selection of AnsaldoBreda and approved a $313 million contract in November 2012. Delivery was scheduled over several years through 2017. During this period, AnsaldoBreda was acquired by Hitachi Rail, delaying full rollout. Flooding at the Hitachi factory in West Plains, Missouri caused further delays.

=== Former fleet ===
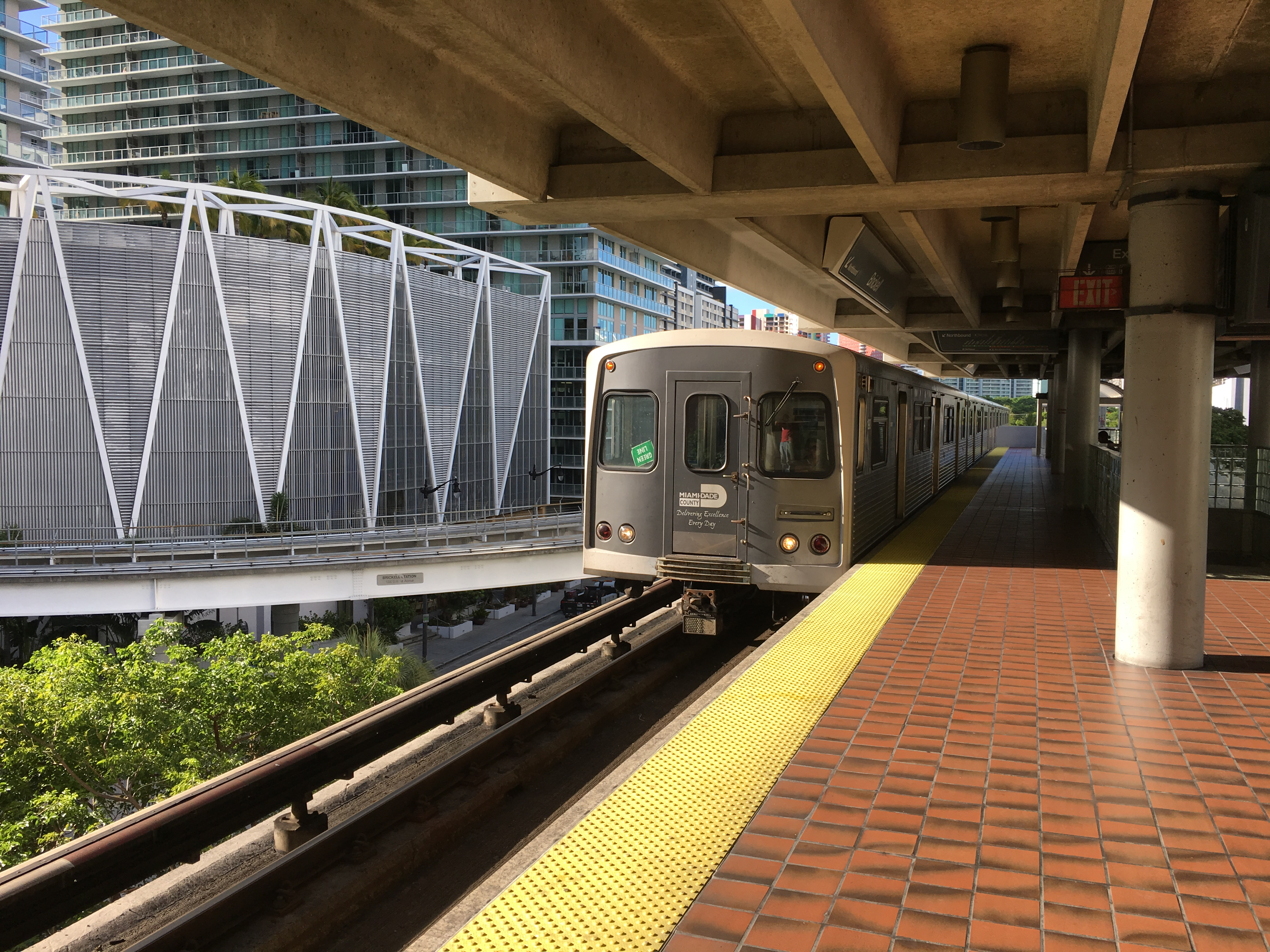
A Budd train entering Brickell station in 2017

External videos
- Metrorail Cars - So Shiny and New Budd Cars delivered 1983
- Riding Metrorail - Sights and sounds of a routine trip on Budd Cars

Metrorail formerly used 136 heavy-rail cars (known as the Universal Transit Vehicle) built by the Budd Company under the name "Transit America"; they are identical to those used on the Baltimore Metro SubwayLink, as the two systems were built at the same time, and the two agencies were able to save money by sharing a single order. The Baltimore-Miami order was among the last orders Budd filled before shuttering its railcar manufacturing business. A fleet of similar railcars, built to the same specification, was manufactured by Breda for Los Angeles Metro Rail between 1988 and 2000.

These cars were manufactured in Budd's Red Lion plant in Northeast Philadelphia in 1983. The cars are 75 feet (23 m) long, 10 feet (3.0 m) wide and have a top design speed of over 70 mph (110 km/h). Each car can hold up to 166 passengers (76 seated, 90 standing), and draw power from an electric 750 V DC third rail.

== Fares and services ==
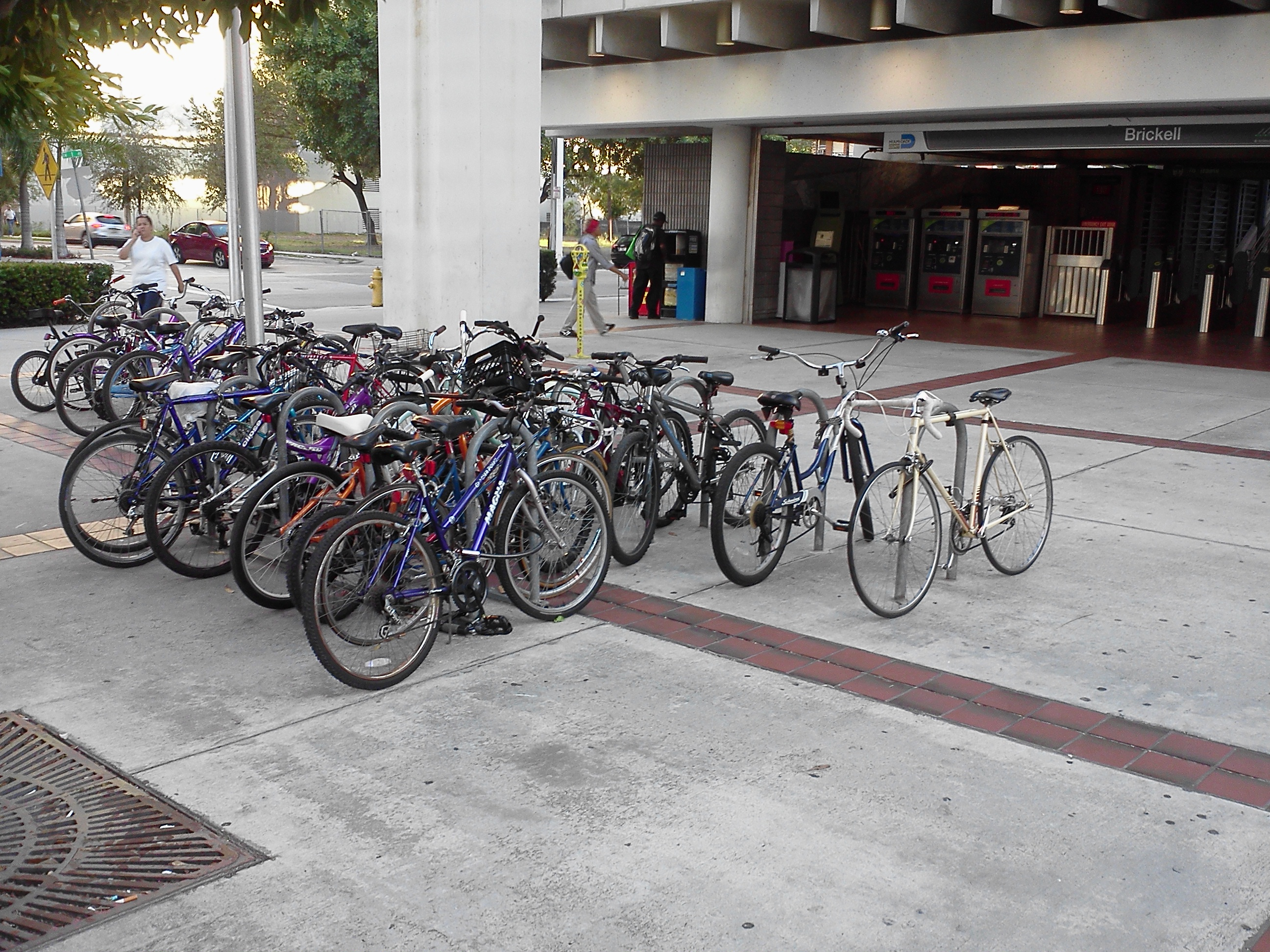
A busy bike and ride rack at Brickell station. Some stations have bike lockers; bicycles are also allowed on the trains.

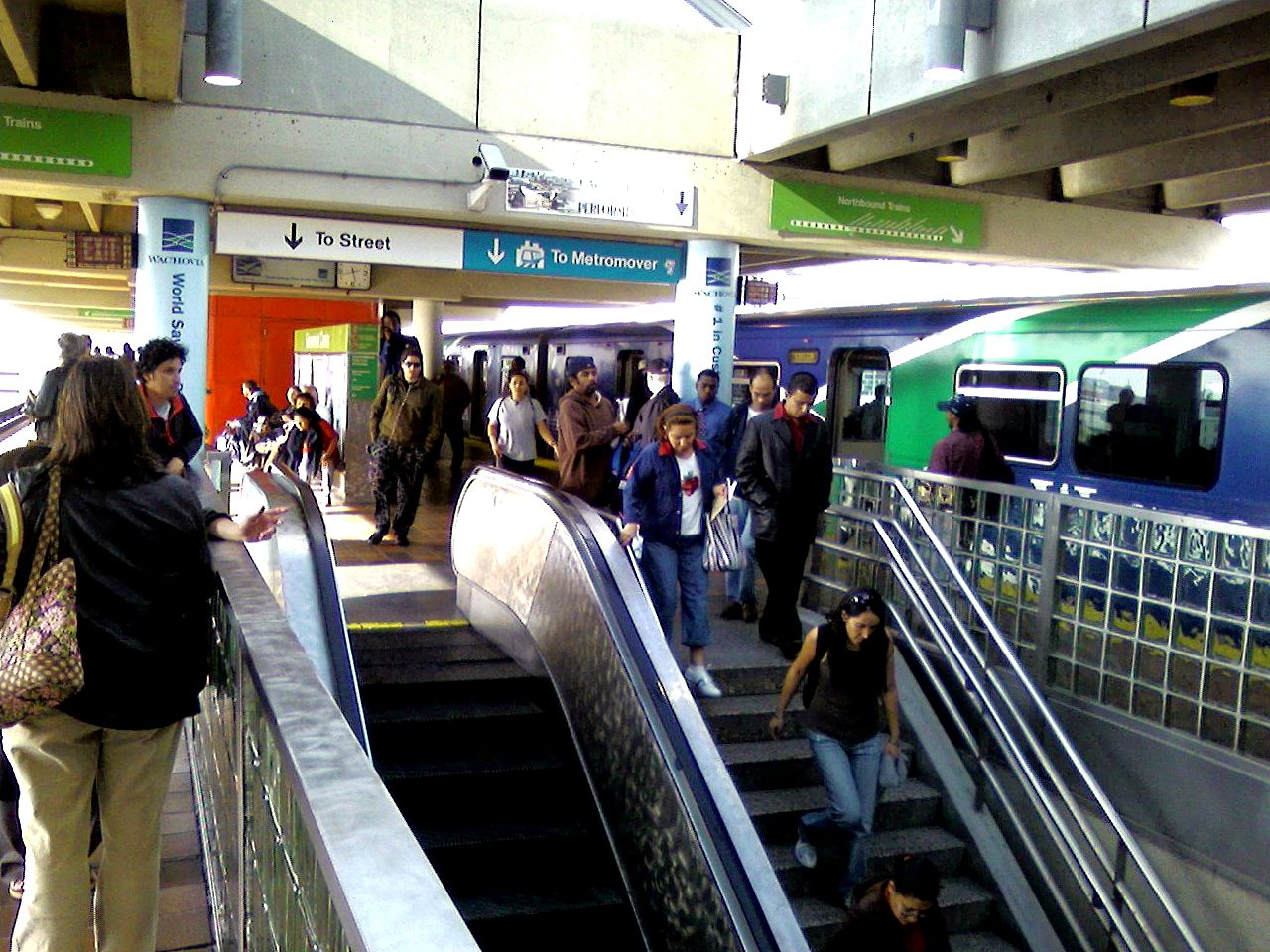
Passengers at Government Center

As of August 3, 2024, the current standard fare on Metrorail is $2.25 and reduced fare is $1.10. A standard monthly pass costs $112.50 and $56.25 for reduced fare. The monthly Easy Cards are sold at over 50 sales outlets. Reduced fares are available only to Medicare recipients, people with disabilities, and Miami-Dade students in grades 1 through 12. Children below 42 inches (110 cm) tall ride free when accompanied by a fare-paying rider, with a limit of 3. Ticket vending machines (TVMs) that sell Easy Cards and Easy Tickets are found in all rail stations. All Miami-Dade senior citizens aged 65 years and older and with Social Security benefits, and veterans residing in Miami-Dade and earning less than $22,000 annually ride free with the reduced fare monthly Easy Card. All of the stations except the five in the downtown area and Tri-Rail station have dedicated parking available. Parking costs $4.50 per day or $11.50 for a monthly pass.

On July 16, 2008, Miami-Dade Transit announced that it would be replacing all fare collection methods with the Easy Card system by late 2009. The system replaces the old cash and token-based system with one that automatically deducts fares at Metrorail fare gates from a reloadable card. The final station to start fare gate installation was Government Center on August 2, 2009. Since the system launch on October 1, 2009, all passengers using Metrorail must use either an Easy Card or Easy Ticket to enter stations. For almost the full first year of use, the Easy Card ticket vending machines allowed anyone to purchase thousands of dollars' worth of Easy Cards by credit card without entering a PIN or billing zip code, which led to credit card thieves putting high dollar values on Easy Cards and selling them at a discounted rate for cash. Miami-Dade Transit initially mitigated this issue by limiting credit card transactions to three per day and a value limit of $112, and later by requiring zip code verification for all cards.

From 2009 to 2011, free Wi-Fi was added to Metrorail and Metromover cars and stations, as well as certain Metrobus routes.

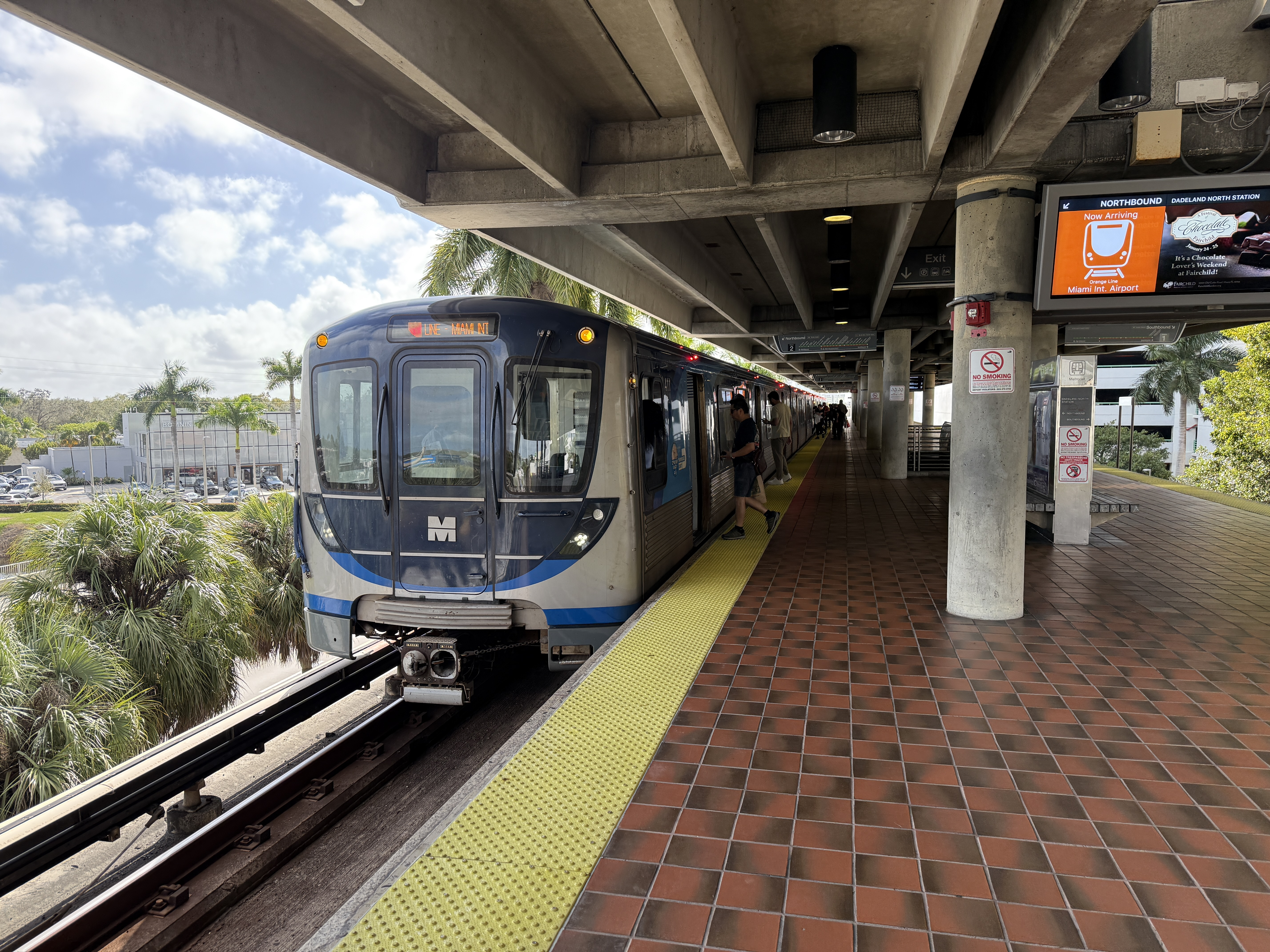
A northbound Orange Line trains stops at Dadeland North station

Starting July 28, 2012, Metrorail increased service along shared Green and Orange Line stations from Dadeland South to Earlington Heights. Along this stretch of shared track, trains arrive every 5 minutes during peak hours, every 7 minutes during mid-day hours, and every 15 minutes late nights and on weekends. At stations with only one service, trains arrive every 10 minutes during weekday rush hours, every 15 minutes at midday, and every 15–30 minutes after 6 p.m. until midnight with weekend service running every 30 minutes. On weekends, the Orange Line only runs between Earlington Heights and Miami International Airport, running every 15 minutes. Metrorail runs from 5 a.m. until midnight seven days a week. For a brief period from June 2003 to April 2004 there was 24-hour service supported by the transit tax; between midnight and 5 a.m. trains arrived every 60 minutes.

A limited-stop bus route, Route 500 Midnight Owl, operates hourly between 12:30 a.m. and 5:30 a.m. trip between Dadeland South and Government Center Metrorail stations. This bus service replaces the 24-hour Metrorail service cancelled due to a lack of ridership.

Construction on the first segment of the Orange Line, Metrorail's AirportLink began in May 2009; service to Miami International Airport began in the summer of 2012.

On August 21, 2019, Miami-Dade Transit launched contactless payments acceptance on the Metrorail which enabled transit riders to use their smartphone devices (Apple Pay, Google Pay, Samsung Pay), as well as smart watches (Apple Pay, Google Pay, Samsung Pay, Fitbit Pay) to tap and go at all stations. Fare gates were updated instead of replaced to save money. Currently Miami-Dade Transit doesn't allow Express Transit Mode on iOS. The company behind the fare systems is Cubic Transportation Systems, a partner with MDT since the beginning of the Easy Card/Ticket implementation.

== The Underline ==
The Underline is a 10-mile-long (16 km) linear park under development in Miami-Dade County, Florida. When completed, it will run beneath the county's elevated Metrorail system between the Brickell neighborhood of Downtown Miami and Dadeland South station in Kendall. The project converts a pre-existing bicycle and pedestrian path known as the MetroPath or M-Path. At Dadeland South, the Underline connects with the South Dade Trail forming a continuous corridor extending south to Florida City.

The first phase of The Underline, located in the Brickell area, was completed on February 26, 2021. The second phase, extending from Brickell to just south of Vizcaya station, opened on April 24, 2024. The third and final phase is scheduled for completion in 2026.

== Stations ==
Metrorail currently operates 23 stations, located at about one mile (1.6 km) apart along the line. Travel times provided are approximate for travel to and from Government Center in Downtown.

Station	Lines	Time to Downtown	Connections	Opened	Avg. weekday passengers (As of Oct. 2025)
Palmetto		31 min	Metrobus: 87; Doral Trolley: 2, 3	May 30, 2003	1,487
Okeechobee		26 min	Metrobus: 73, 183	May 19, 1985	872
Hialeah		23 min	Metrobus: 37, 54, 54A, 79; Hialeah Transit: Flamingo, Marlin; Miami Springs/Virginia Gardens Shuttle	May 19, 1985	1,021
Tri-Rail		21 min	Tri-Rail; Amtrak: Floridian, Silver Meteor (at Miami station); Metrobus: 79	June 5, 1989	936
Northside		19 min	Metrobus: 12, 21, 32, 79, 279	May 19, 1985	1,286
Dr. Martin Luther King Jr. Plaza		16 min	Metrobus: 27, 27A, 62	May 19, 1985	754
Brownsville		14 min	Metrobus: 27, 27A, 54, 54A	May 19, 1985	487
Miami International Airport		16 min	Tri-Rail; MIA Mover; Metrobus: 7, 20, 36, 37, 42, 57,150, 338; Broward County Transit: 115; Miami Trolley: Flagami; Flixbus; Greyhound Lines; Megabus	July 28, 2012	1,306
Earlington Heights		11 min	Metrobus: 17, 22, 95, 95A, 95B	December 17, 1984	1,367
Allapattah		9 min	Metrobus: 12, 21, 36, 36A, 401; Broward County Transit: 106, 108, 114; Miami Trolley: Liberty City	December 17, 1984	1,687
Santa Clara		7 min	Metrobus: 12, 20, 21, 32, 95, 95A, 95B, 401; Broward County Transit: 106, 108, 114; Miami Trolley: Allapattah, Stadium	December 17, 1984	809
UHealth–Jackson		6 min	Metrobus: 12, 95, 95A, 95B, 401; Broward County Transit: 106, 108, 114; Miami Trolley: Health District, Stadium	December 17, 1984	4,792
Culmer		4 min	Metrobus: 77; Broward County Transit: 106, 108, 114; Miami Trolley: Overtown	December 17, 1984	584
Historic Overtown/Lyric Theatre		2 min	Metrobus: 2, 7, 95, 95A, 95B, 401, 836, 837; Broward County Transit: 109, 110	May 20, 1984	2,399
Government Center		—N/a	Brightline (at MiamiCentral); Tri-Rail (at MiamiCentral); Metromover: Omni Brickell Inner; Metrobus: 2, 3, 7, 7A, 9, 11, 21, 77, 95, 95A, 95B, 100, 101, 203, 207, 208, 211, 400, 401, 836, 837; Broward County Transit: 109, 110	May 20, 1984	7,140
Brickell		2 min	Metromover: Brickell; Metrobus: 8, 24, 26, 207, 208, 400; Miami Trolley: Brickell, Coral Way, Little Havana; Broward County Transit: 109, 110	May 20, 1984	5,400
Vizcaya		5 min	Metrobus: 12, 17, 24, 400; Miami Trolley: Coral Way	May 20, 1984	1,526
Coconut Grove		7 min	Metrobus: 22, 27, 27A, 400; Miami Trolley: Coconut Grove	May 20, 1984	1,734
Douglas Road		9 min	Metrobus: 37, 40, 136, 400; Coral Gables Trolley: Grand Avenue, Ponce de Leon, Southern Loop; Miami Trolley: Coconut Grove	May 20, 1984	3,325
University		12 min	Metrobus: 56, 57, 400; Coral Gables Trolley: Southern Loop	May 20, 1984	2,618
South Miami		14 min	Metrobus: 37, 72, 73, 400	May 20, 1984	2,569
Dadeland North		16 min	Metrobus: 73, 87, 88, 104, 104A, 204, 272, 288, 400	May 20, 1984	4,996
Dadeland South		18 min	Metrobus: 400; South Dade TransitWay: 601, 602; Palmetto Bay IBus	May 20, 1984	4,603

== Proposed expansions ==
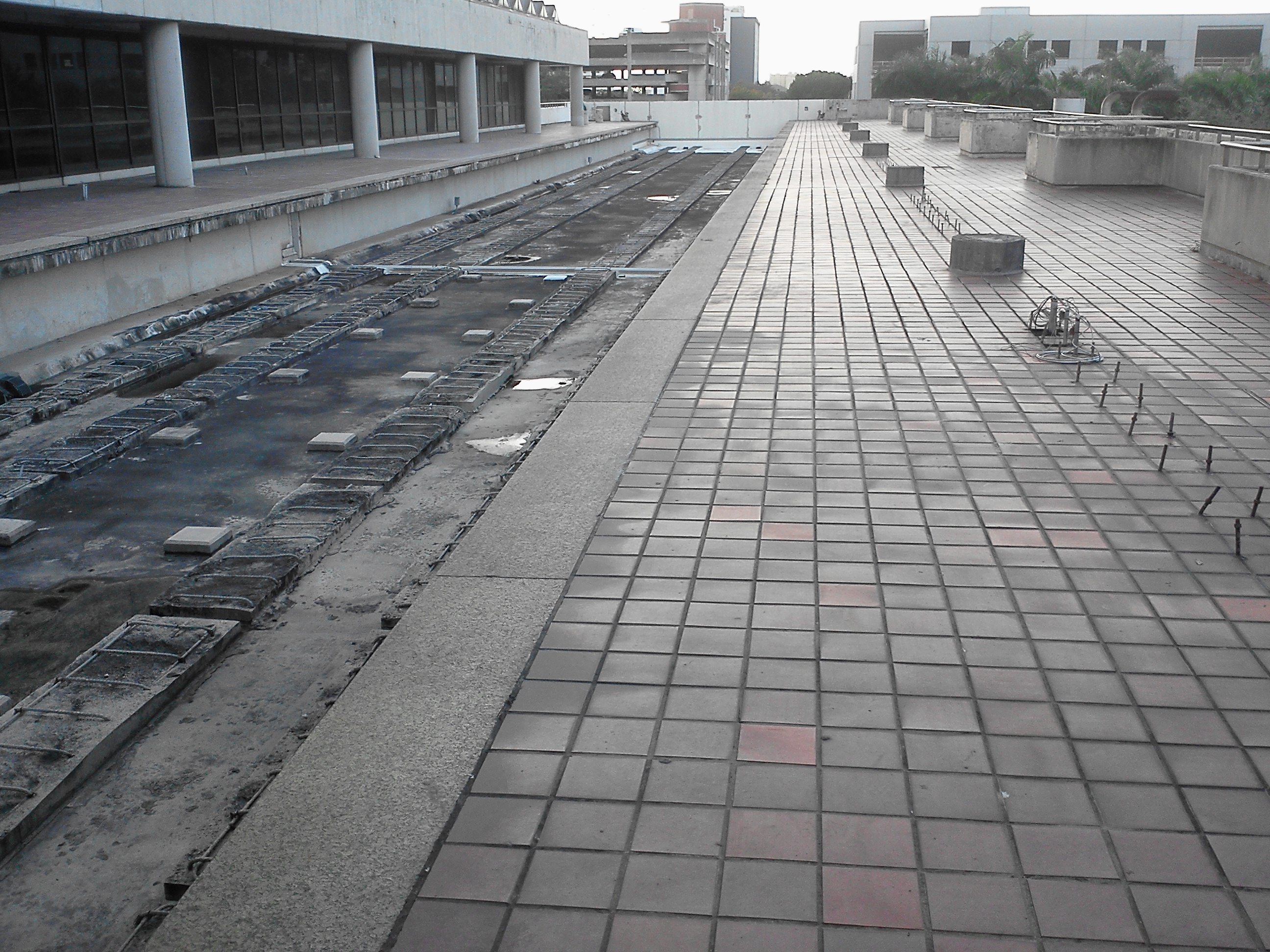
The unused east–west platform at Government Center, built in 1984 with the existing system, but never completed.

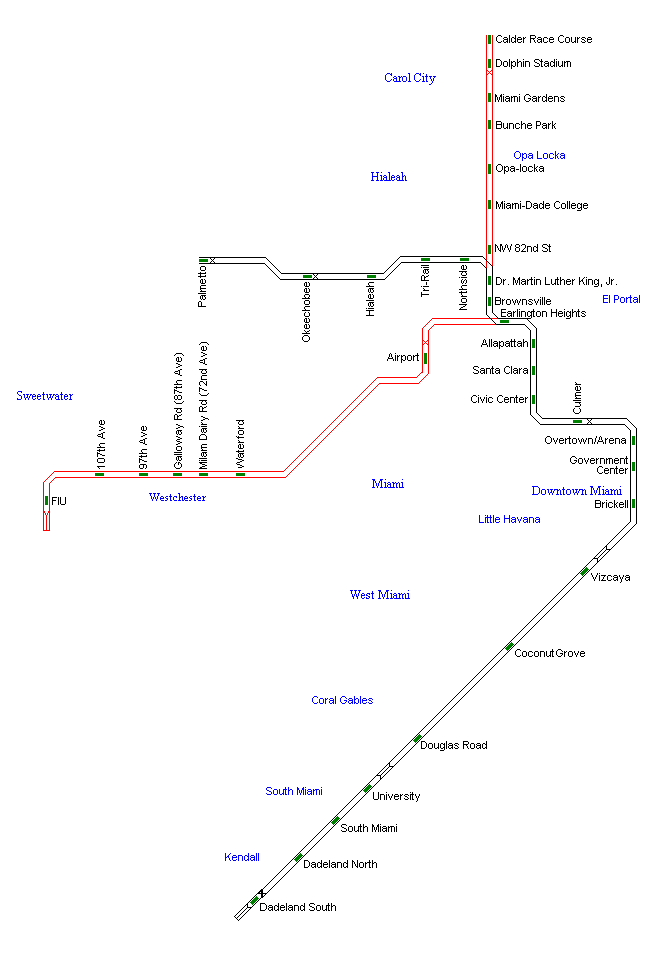
One variation of the Orange Line extensions was for a continuation past the current airport station instead of the 1984 ghost platform at Government Center.

From the beginning, the Metrorail was designed and envisioned to have more lines than the current two line system; however, the federally subsidized cost of the original line ended up over budget at $1.02 billion, after which ridership was much lower than expected. The proposed lines included:

- The 13.6 mi (21.9 km) Biscayne/Northeast Corridor following U.S. Route 1 (Biscayne Boulevard) from Government Center up to the Broward/Miami-Dade county line in Aventura.
- The 9.5 mi (15.3 km) North Corridor up NW 27 Avenue to the county line.
- The 17.2 mi (27.7 km) East–West Corridor from Government Center west to the Florida International University main campus in University Park, as well as east from Government Center to the Port of Miami.
- The 5.1 mi (8.2 km) BayLink from Historic Overtown/Lyric Theater station to South Beach, Miami Beach.
- The South Link, a 21 mi (34 km) extension of the Green Line from Dadeland South to Florida City. (Now serviced by the South Dade BRT Line).
- The 4.5 mi (7.2 km) Douglas Road extension from Douglas Road station to the Miami Intermodal Center.
- The 15 mi (24 km) (West) Kendall Corridor down Kendall Drive from Dadeland North station west to West Kendall and north to the FIU main campus.

It was not until the half-penny transit tax was passed in 2002 that any serious expansion plans were again considered, with the North Corridor and East–West lines, both dubbed the "Orange Line," assuming the highest priority, while the possibility of 88.9 miles (143.1 km) of additional rail if all the extensions were built by 2030, was touted. However, after budget deficits, other uses of the tax revenue, and a downgrade of the North Corridor's funding priority to medium-low by the federal government, after 10 years only the 2.4 mile AirportLink and Orange Line remained promised and realized.

The credibility of Miami-Dade Transit and the county as a whole, including the validity of their ridership estimates and revenue forecasts, has been a significant impediment to their qualifications for funding under the Federal Transit Administration's (FTA) approval. In 2011, Miami-Dade Transit underwent a serious federal investigation and takeover by the FTA in which it was forced to open its books over suspicions of money mismanagement. The Agency threatened to cease its funding used to cover operational costs, which would have meant significant cuts in service; however, they took the funding under their strict control to prevent this from happening.

The South Link expansion, which was intended to replace the South Miami-Dade Busway, a bus rapid transit (BRT) that opened in segments on February 3, 1997, and in April 2005, had plans for a widened right of way, elevated crossings at major intersections, as well as the possibility of building one additional Metrorail station at SW 104 Street to alleviate traffic and parking in Dadeland. In 2009, the Metropolitan Planning Organization proposed that the busway be opened to regular vehicle traffic by adding a SunPass toll system with the profits going towards busway improvements. The proposal did not pass. The South Link, now known as Metro Express, currently provides service as a gold standard bus rapid transit line along the transitway.

On November 16, 2022, Miami-Dade County announced that they would accelerate construction on the North Corridor along NW 27th Avenue from Dr. Martin Luther King Jr. Plaza station to Hard Rock Stadium at NW 199th Street in Miami Gardens, Florida, with a goal of starting construction in 2024 with aid from federal funds. The extension will be built in two phases: Phase I would see the extension built up to Hard Rock Stadium with just one station, while Phase II would see more stations built on the elevated line as well as transit-oriented developments built alongside it. On January 9, 2023, the expedition of this extension's design was approved by Miami-Dade County's Transportation, Mobility and Planning Committee on a 9–0 vote, with a station at Miami-Dade College being added to Phase I of the project alongside the terminus at Hard Rock Stadium. Infrastructure design firm HNTB was designated to design the future extension whilst being given $44 million in funding by the TMP Committee. A Project Development and Environment Study is also being done by the Florida Department of Transportation in parallel to HNTB's design work in order to accelerate the start of work. It was also announced that Phase II would include park-and-ride facilities added at five of the eight total stations. As of June 2024, the extension will be completed by 2036.

== Ridership ==
By 2016, Metrorail ridership started to decrease, especially by summer, where July saw the lowest ridership since the Orange Line opened in 2012. This lag follows Metrobus, which began to decline in 2014, amid an aging fleet and falling oil and gas prices, and posted the lowest ridership numbers in over a decade during June and July 2016. For October 2016, even Metromover recorded low ridership, though the low numbers for this specific month were blamed on one day of closure for Hurricane Matthew. 2017 saw a continuation in the ridership decline across all three systems; ridership in September 2017 was impacted by Hurricane Irma despite the exclusion of days without service from the average. All three modes declined sharply starting in March 2020 during the COVID-19 pandemic, slowly recovering over the next three years.

Average Weekday Passengers (Metrorail only)
Fiscal Year (Note: Fiscal year begins in October)	Ridership	%±
1984	16,000
1985	20,000	+20.0%
1995	50,400	+60.3%
1996	48,100	-4.6%
1997	47,300	-1.6%
1998	44,871	-5.2%
1999	46,774	+4.2%
2000	47,256	+1.0%
2001	46,664	-1.3%
2002	47,064	+0.9%
2003	51,248	+8.9%
2004	55,294	+7.9%
2005	59,700	+8.0%
2006	58,358	-2.2%
2007	59,708	+2.3%
2008	63,710	+6.7%
2009	59,992	−6.2%
2010	59,900	0.0%
2011	62,559	+4.4%
2012	69,100	+10.5%
2013	72,700	+5.2%
2014	74,600	+2.6%

Year	Annual passengers (with Metromover)	Average weekday passengers (with Metromover)
1995	18,614,000	63,100
1996	18,092,400	60,100
1997	18,098,900	60,800
1998	17,363,800	58,140
1999	17,839,100	60,654
2000	18,280,100	61,639
2001	18,629,800	63,514
2002	19,103,800	63,508
2003	21,297,400	76,769
2004	24,673,900	83,486
2005	25,538,500	88,173
2006	25,777,600	85,400
2007	26,510,800	87,767
2008	27,799,600	90,392
2009	25,778,200	85,875
2010	25,559,400	87,075
2011	27,515,100	92,334
2012	28,498,500	104,000
2013	30,531,100*	105,500*

* Record high

=== Ridership records ===
Date	Passengers	Remarks
May 20, 1984	150,000	Inaugural day
June 24, 2013	117,000	Miami Heat parade
January 1, 1991	101,000	New Year's Day

== See also ==
- Transportation in South Florida
- List of metro systems
- List of United States rapid transit systems by ridership
- List of North American rapid transit systems by ridership
- List of Florida railroads
