= Florida State Road 907 =

State highway in Florida, United States

State Road 907
- Alton Road
- SR 907 in red, SR 907A in blue

Route information
- Maintained by FDOT
- Length: 5.659 mi (9.107 km)
- Existed: 1983–present

Major junctions
- South end: SR A1A in Miami Beach
- I-195 in Miami Beach
- North end: SR A1A in Miami Beach

Location
- Country: United States
- State: Florida
- Counties: Miami-Dade

Highway system
- Florida State Highway System; Interstate; US; State; Former; Pre‑1945; Toll; Scenic
← SR 887	→ SR 909

State Road 907 (SR 907), also known as Alton Road and 63rd Street, is a major north–south artery in Miami Beach, Florida, USA, extending 5.659-mile (9.107 km). It is one of a few of the state roads that have both termini on the same state route. In this case, the southern terminus is the intersection of Alton Road and Fifth Street (SR A1A), and the northern terminus is the intersection of 63rd Street and Collins Avenue (SR A1A). Alton Road snakes up the western (Biscayne Bay) side of the barrier islands comprising Miami Beach, while Collins Avenue parallels the Atlantic shore to the east. In addition, SR 907 is often used as a bypass for the oft-congested SR A1A.

Alton Road has seen early ripples of sea level rise caused by global warming.

== Route description ==
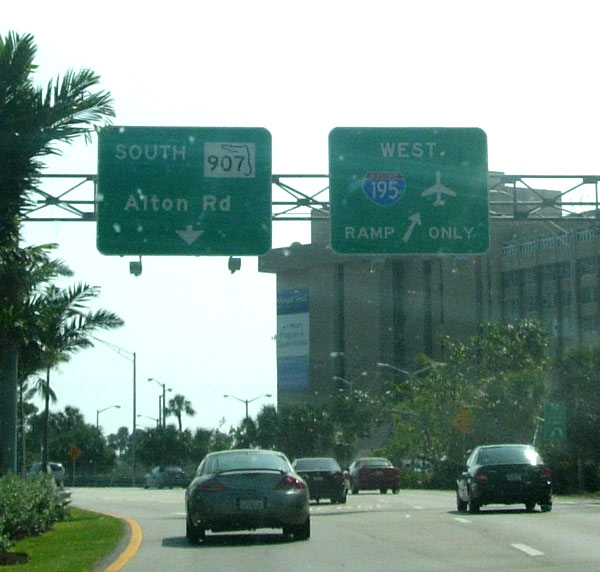
Alton Road southbound at the Interstate 195 interchange

State Road 907 begins at the intersection of State Road A1A and Alton Road. Motorists heading east on SR A1A from Miami can use a left turn lane on SR A1A to access the southern terminus of SR 907. SR 907 heads north as Alton Road, through South Beach, as a commercial County fair, staying within 1-3 blocks east of Biscayne Bay. Two blocks south of Dade Boulevard, SR 907 reaches the westernmost end of Lincoln Road Mall, one of America's first open-air pedestrian shopping centers.

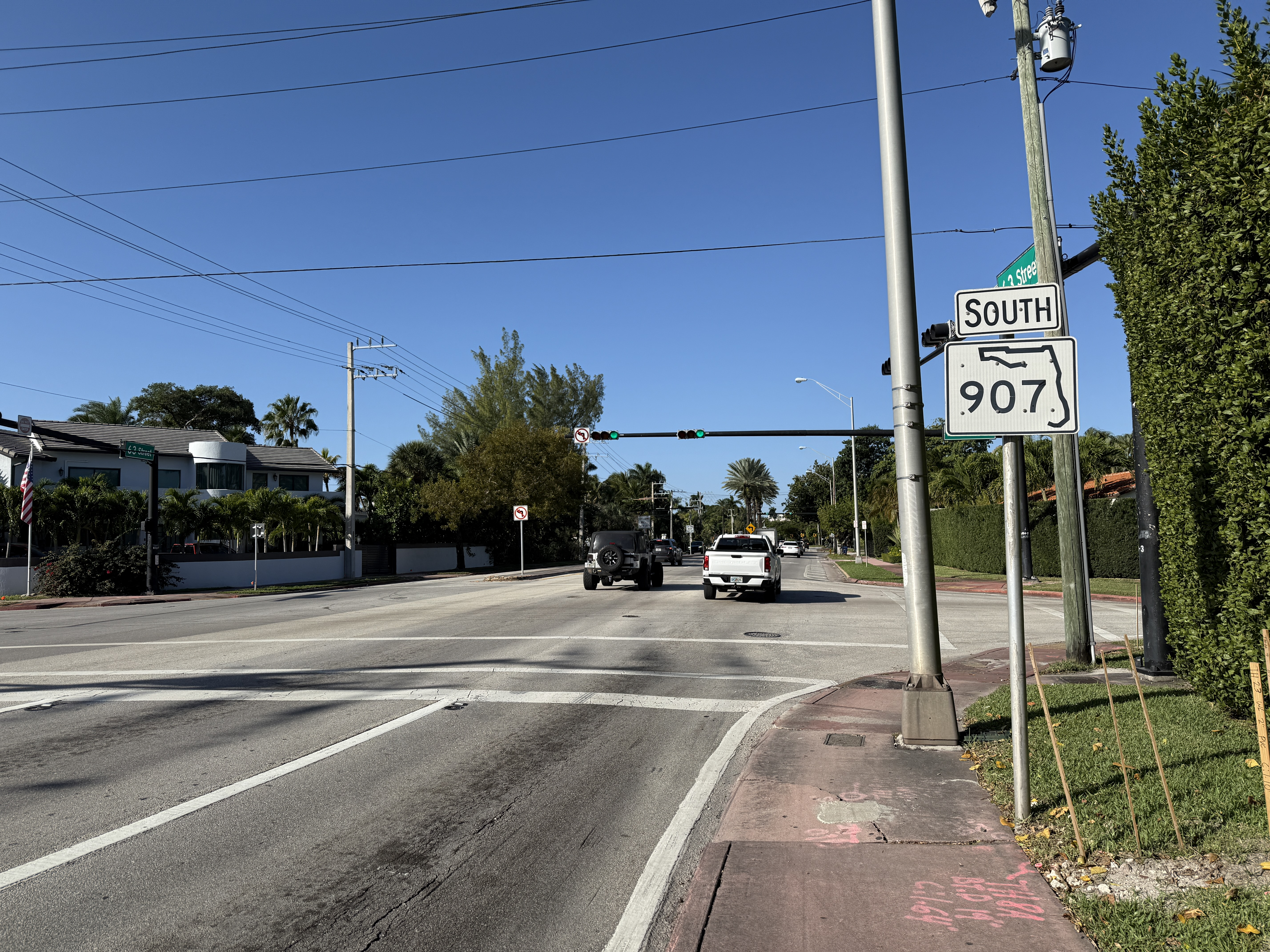
SR 907 southbound in Miami Beach

It leaves South Beach north of the Dade Boulevard intersection and two blocks later, crosses Michigan Avenue, where Alton Road becomes a residential street. It then curves slightly west before continuing north, and passes by the western end of the Miami Beach Country Club. At the northwest end of the golf club, SR 907 crosses a canal and briefly branches off Alton Road, which becomes SR 907A, and heads through a bypass west of Alton Road. The bypass provides direct access to I-195 west and the Mount Sinai Medical Center. At the hospital's main entrance, SR 907 rejoins Alton Road, and continues north through residential streets, continuing to curve northeast and crossing another canal just north of the Miami Heat Stadium. At the northern end of the canal, SR 907 passes through the western end of the La Gorce Golf Course. At the northern end of the golf course, SR 907 leaves Alton Road and becomes W 63rd Street, crossing two more canals and intersecting with SR A1A again to end its route.

== History ==
Upon completion of State Road 112 (Interstate 195) in 1961, a bypass section of Alton Road near Mount Sinai Medical Center was constructed just west of Alton Road for direct access between the hospital and the limited access highway.

The road was originally signed as State Road 945 in 1980. Three years later, SR 945 became SR 907.

== Major intersections ==
The entire route is in Miami Beach, Miami-Dade County.

mi	km	Destinations	Notes
0.000	0.000	SR A1A (MacArthur Causeway) to I-95 – Airport	Flyover from SR A1A north to SR 907 north
1.307	2.103	Dade Boulevard	to Venetian Causeway
2.572	4.139	Alton Road (SR 907A north)	No southbound left turn to SR 907A north
2.75	4.43	I-195 west (SR 112) to I-95 / Florida's Turnpike – Downtown Miami, Airport	Exit 5 on I-195; eastern terminus of I-195
3.013	4.849	43rd Street (SR 907A south)	
5.55	8.93	63rd Street Bridge over Indian Creek	
5.607	9.024	SR A1A south (Indian Creek Drive)	
5.659	9.107	SR A1A north (Collins Avenue)	
1.000 mi = 1.609 km; 1.000 km = 0.621 mi: Incomplete access

== Related route ==
State Road 907A
- Location: Miami Beach
- Length: 0.408 mi (657 m)

State Road 907A (SR 907A) is a 0.408-mile (0.657 km) section of Alton Road, running parallel to the bypass section of SR 907, running near I-195. SR 907A starts at Alton Road, just north of a canal crossing, at 34th Street. SR 907A heads straight north, with SR 907 taking the bypass route to the west. Alton Road heads through a commercial area, intersecting with I-195's eastern terminus and State Road 112 three blocks from its southern terminus. Alton Road continues north through a residential area, intersecting with its northern terminus of SR 907 at the Mount Sinai Medical Center entrance.

While motorists going westbound on SR 112 see trailblazer signs for SR 907A (one noting "JCT 907A" and two directional trailblazers a half block from Alton Road), those are the only indications of the existence of the north–south state road. In 1980, the branch of Alton Road that ran east of the bypass near I-195/SR 112 was designated SR 945A. Three years later, it became SR 907A.

The entire route is in Miami Beach, Miami-Dade County.

mi	km	Destinations	Notes
0.000	0.000	SR 907 (Alton Road) to I-195	Southern terminus
0.181	0.291	I-195 west / SR 112 (41st Street / Arthur Godfrey Road) to I-95 – Downtown Miami, Airport	Eastern terminus of I-195
0.408	0.657	SR 907 (Alton Road)	Northern terminus
1.000 mi = 1.609 km; 1.000 km = 0.621 mi
