= Brownsville station =

Miami-Dade Transit metro station

● Brownsville
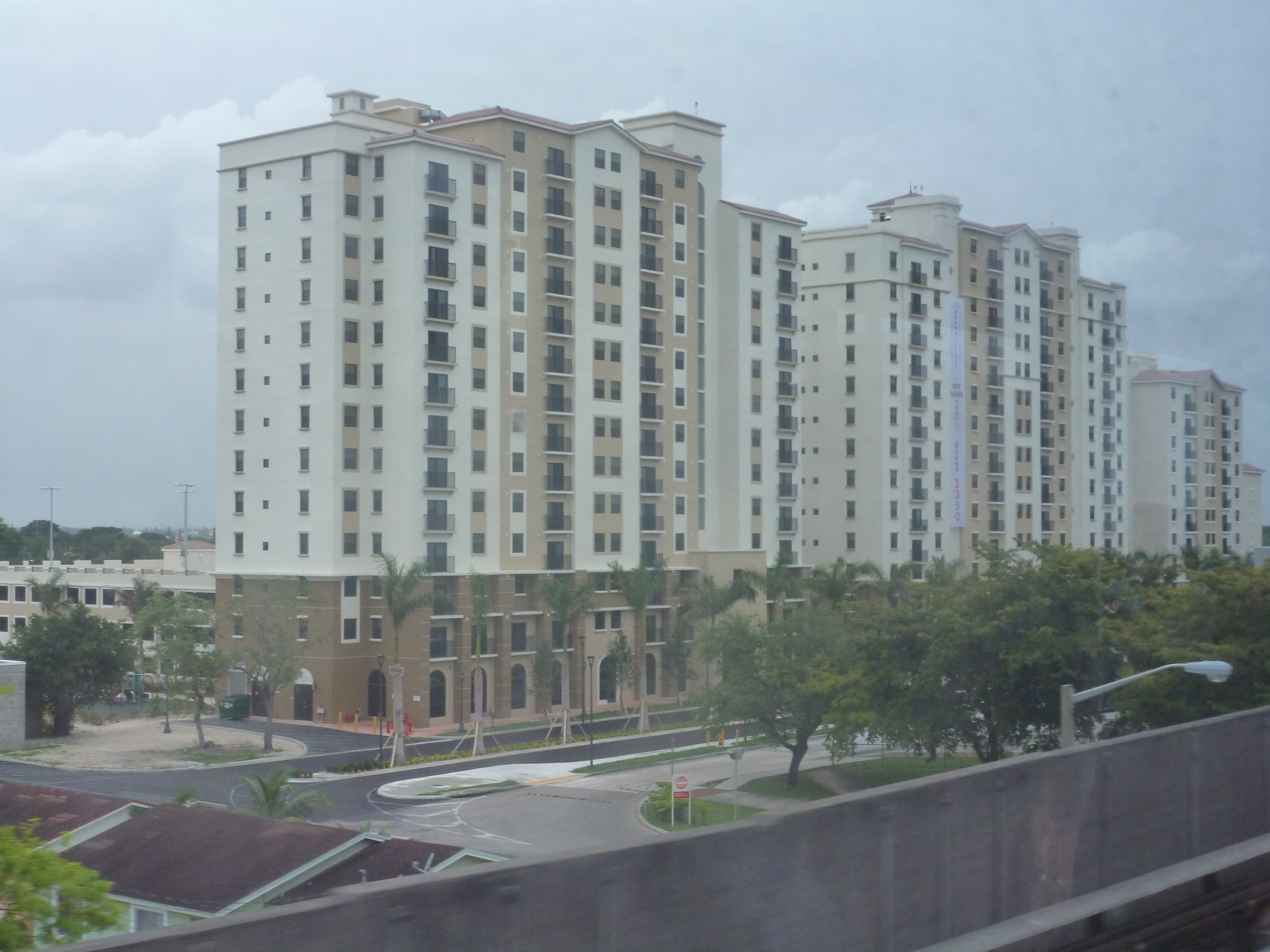
- Brownsville Transit Village in 2012

General information
- Location: 5200 NW 27th Avenue; Miami, Florida
- Coordinates: 25°49′19″N 80°14′26″W
- Owner: Miami-Dade County
- Platforms: 2 side platforms
- Tracks: 2
- Connections: Metrobus: 27, 54

Construction
- Parking: Park and ride (423 spaces)
- Accessible: Yes

Other information
- Station code: BVL

History
- Opened: May 19, 1985

Passengers
- 2011: 252,000 ▼7%

Services
| Preceding station | Miami-Dade Transit | Following station |
|---|---|---|
| Earlington Heights toward Dadeland South | Green Line | Dr. Martin Luther King Jr. Plaza toward Palmetto |
Location

Brownsville station is a Metrorail station in Brownsville, Florida. It is located at the intersection of Northwest 27th Avenue (SR 9) and 52nd Street, opening to service May 19, 1985.

== Places of interest ==
- Brownsville
- Joseph Caleb Community Center
- Family Health Center
- Brownsville Renaissance (Retail shops, Movie theater)
- Historic Hampton House Hotel

=== Brownsville Transit Village ===
Adjacent to the Brownsville Metrorail station is the construction of a new housing project, "Brownsville Transit Village." The project is composed of 5 mid-rise residential towers (467 apartments) with ground floor retail. The buildings are considered transit-oriented development, and are being designed around the metro station. The project was completed by 2012. However, as of 2016, Brownsville and Santa Clara (Santa Clara Apartments TOD), are the lowest ridership stations in the system.
