= Dr. Martin Luther King Jr. Plaza station (Metrorail) =

Miami-Dade Transit metro station

● Dr. Martin Luther King Jr. Plaza
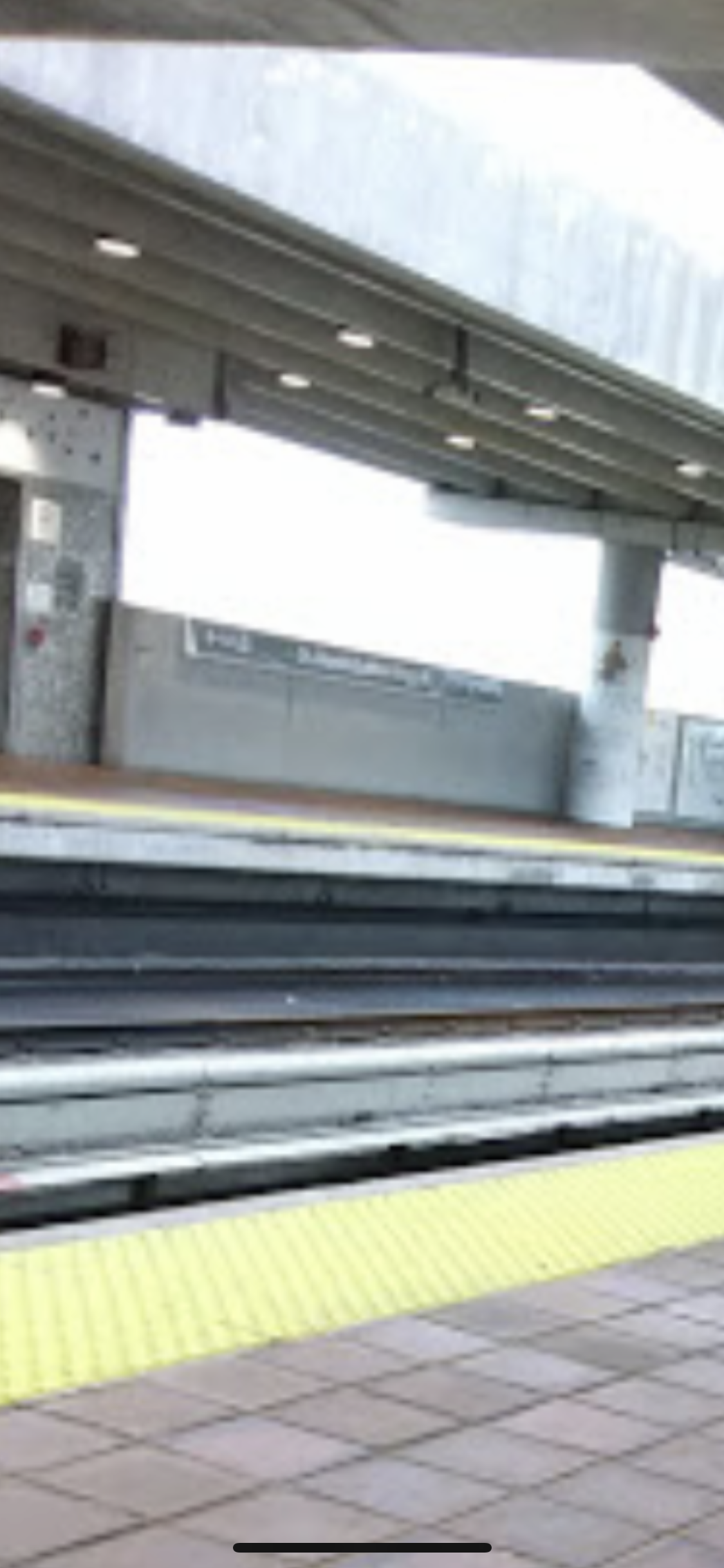

General information
- Location: 6205 NW 27th Avenue; Miami, Florida
- Coordinates: 25°49′56″N 80°14′27″W
- Owner: Miami-Dade County
- Platforms: 2 side platforms
- Tracks: 2
- Connections: Metrobus: 27, 62

Construction
- Parking: Garage (643 spaces)
- Accessible: Yes

Other information
- Station code: MLK

History
- Opened: May 19, 1985

Passengers
- 2011: 424,000 ▲6%

Services
Preceding station	Miami-Dade Transit	Following station
Brownsville toward Dadeland South	Green Line	Northside toward Palmetto
Location

Dr. Martin Luther King Jr. Plaza station is a station of the Metrorail rapid transit system in Gladeview, Florida, United States.

The station is located at the intersection of West 27th Avenue (SR 9) and North 62nd Street/Dr. Martin Luther King Jr. Boulevard, opening to service May 19, 1985.

== Places of interest ==
- Brownsville
- Liberty City
