= Brownsville (Miami) =

- Neighborhood of Miami
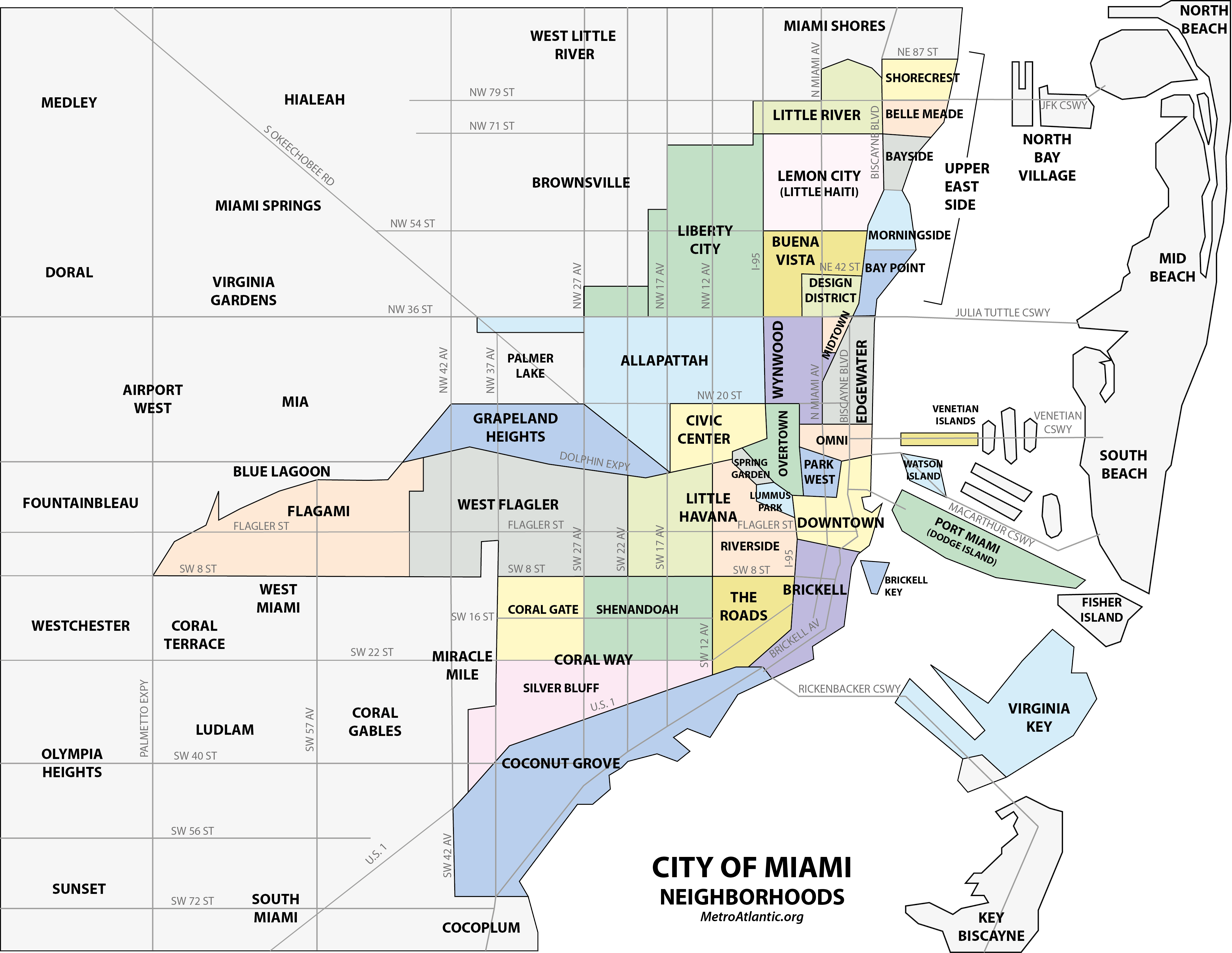
- Location in Miami-Dade County and the state of Florida

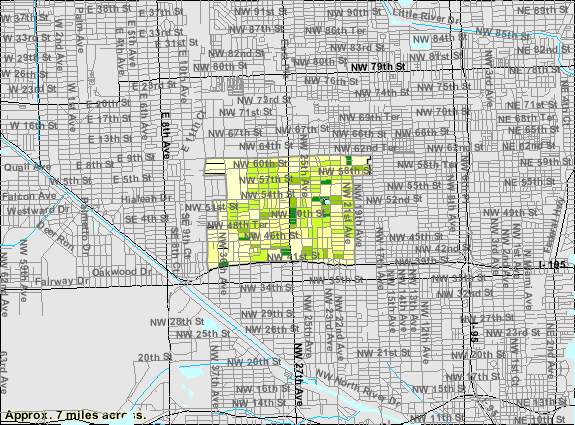
- U.S. Census Bureau map showing CDP boundaries
- Coordinates: 25°49′16″N 80°14′50″W
- Country: United States
- State: Florida
- County: Miami-Dade

Area
  - Total: 2.28 sq mi (5.90 km^{2})
  - Land: 2.28 sq mi (5.90 km^{2})
  - Water: 0 sq mi (0.00 km^{2})
- Elevation: 7 ft (2.1 m)

Population (2020)
  - Total: 16,583
  - Density: 7,280/sq mi (2,810/km^{2})
- Time zone: UTC-5 (Eastern (EST))
  - Summer (DST): UTC-4 (EDT)
- ZIP Code: 33142 (Miami)
- Area codes: 305, 786, 645
- FIPS code: 12-09000
- GNIS feature ID: 2402723

Brownsville (also known as Brown Sub) is an unincorporated community and census-designated place (CDP) that is part of the Miami metropolitan area of South Florida. As of the 2020 US census, the population was 16,583, up from 15,313 in 2010. After three decades of population loss, Brownsville gained population for the first time in over 40 years in the 2010 US Census.

== History ==
Brownsville was originally a settlement for white families in the 1920s. Black families began moving into the neighborhood between the late 1940s and early 1960s as the population surrounding nearby Liberty Square expanded and many inner-city whites moved to newly built suburban subdivisions surrounding Miami city proper in the wake of World War II.

In 1945, two black couples who lived in Brownsville were arrested and jailed for allegedly mishandling their garbage disposal. That same year, members of the Ku Klux Klan burned crosses in lawns and marched against black home ownership in the area.

By the mid-1960s, Brownsville was a thriving community for black professionals. However, the wake of the Civil Rights Act of 1968 that outlawed restrictive covenants, and riots in 1968 and 1980 brought about the black flight of middle and upper-class families from the community. Brownsville experienced continued population loss from 1970 until 2000, as part of a greater suburbanization trend among the U.S. upwardly-mobile middle class. Between 2000 and 2010, Brownsville gained population for the first time in over 40 years, rising to 15,313 residents.

Construction began on a transit-oriented development, "Brownsville Transit Village", in 2010, on the 5.8-acre (2.3 ha) site of the Brownsville Metrorail station parking lot. The project cost $100 million to build, and is composed of 467 units in five high-rise residential towers with ground-floor retail centered around the Brownsville Metro station. The project was partially funded by the American Recovery and Reinvestment Act of 2009, and is one of the largest transit-oriented and affordable housing projects in Miami.

== Geography ==
Brownsville is located 6 miles (10 km) northwest of downtown Miami. It is bordered to the east and southeast by the city of Miami, to the north by unincorporated Gladeview, to the west by the city of Hialeah, and to the south by unincorporated Miami-Dade County. Interstate 195 (Airport Expressway) forms the southern border of the community.

According to the United States Census Bureau, the Brownsville CDP has a total area of 2.3 square miles (6.0 km^{2}), all of it land.

== Demographics ==
Historical population
Census	Pop.	Note	%±
1970	23,442		—
1980	18,058		−23.0%
1990	15,607		−13.6%
2000	14,393		−7.8%
2010	15,313		6.4%
2020	16,583		8.3%
U.S. Decennial Census

=== Racial and ethnic composition ===
Brownsville CDP, Florida – Racial and ethnic composition Note: the US Census treats Hispanic/Latino as an ethnic category. This table excludes Latinos from the racial categories and assigns them to a separate category. Hispanics/Latinos may be of any race.
Race / Ethnicity (NH = Non-Hispanic)	Pop 2000	Pop 2010	Pop 2020	% 2000	% 2010	% 2020
White alone (NH)	102	181	362	0.71%	1.18%	2.18%
Black or African American alone (NH)	12,974	11,081	8,448	90.14%	72.36%	50.94%
Native American or Alaska Native alone (NH)	21	13	15	0.15%	0.08%	0.09%
Asian alone (NH)	3	7	16	0.02%	0.05%	0.10%
Native Hawaiian or Pacific Islander alone (NH)	2	0	2	0.01%	0.00%	0.01%
Other race alone (NH)	5	10	45	0.03%	0.07%	0.27%
Mixed race or Multiracial (NH)	103	82	154	0.72%	0.54%	0.93%
Hispanic or Latino (any race)	1,183	3,939	7,541	8.22%	25.72%	45.47%
Total	14,393	15,313	16,583	100.00%	100.00%	100.00%

=== 2020 census ===
As of the 2020 census, Brownsville had a population of 16,583. The median age was 36.8 years. 24.9% of residents were under the age of 18 and 14.2% were 65 years of age or older. For every 100 females there were 92.2 males, and for every 100 females age 18 and over there were 89.5 males age 18 and over.

100.0% of residents lived in urban areas, while 0.0% lived in rural areas.

There were 5,849 households in Brownsville, of which 34.2% had children under the age of 18 living in them. Of all households, 24.3% were married-couple households, 23.9% were households with a male householder and no spouse or partner present, and 43.9% were households with a female householder and no spouse or partner present. About 29.4% of all households were made up of individuals and 15.0% had someone living alone who was 65 years of age or older.

There were 6,465 housing units, of which 9.5% were vacant. The homeowner vacancy rate was 1.5% and the rental vacancy rate was 4.7%.

The 2020 American Community Survey 5-year estimates reported 3,521 families residing in the CDP.

=== 2010 census ===
As of the 2010 census, there were 15,313 people, 4,476 households, and 2,744 families residing in the CDP.

=== 2000 census ===
As of the census of 2000, there were 14,393 people, 4,814 households, and 3,254 families residing in the CDP. The population density was 6,275.1 inhabitants per square mile (2,422.8/km^{2}). There were 5,506 housing units at an average density of 2,400.5 per square mile (926.8/km^{2}). The racial makeup of the CDP was 91.23% African American, 5.76% White, 0.22% Native American, 0.02% Asian, 0.01% Pacific Islander, 1.45% from other races, and 1.30% from two or more races. Hispanic or Latino of any race were 8.22% of the population.

There were 4,814 households, out of which 34.3% had children under the age of 18 living with them, 21.1% were married couples living together, 39.2% had a female householder with no husband present, and 32.4% were non-families. 27.9% of all households were made up of individuals, and 12.7% had someone living alone who was 65 years of age or older. The average household size was 2.98 and the average family size was 3.66.

In the CDP, the population was spread out, with 35.0% under the age of 18, 10.0% from 18 to 24, 25.7% from 25 to 44, 17.4% from 45 to 64, and 11.9% who were 65 years of age or older. The median age was 29 years. For every 100 females, there were 83.7 males. For every 100 females age 18 and over, there were 75.2 males.

The median income for a household in the CDP was $16,902, and the median income for a family was $19,703. Males had a median income of $21,098 versus $21,182 for females. The per capita income for the CDP was $9,722. About 37.4% of families and 42.7% of the population were below the poverty line, including 54.6% of those under age 18 and 33.2% of those age 65 or over.

As of 2000, speakers of English as a first language accounted for 89.22% of residents, while Spanish made up 10.22% of the population, and French Creole made up 0.53% of all residents.

== Sites ==
Brownsville is home to Georgette's Tea Room House and the Seventh-day Adventist Church that owns it.

== Education ==
Miami-Dade County Public Schools operates area public schools.

=== Elementary schools ===
- Lorah Park Elementary School
- Kelsey L. Pharr Elementary School
- Olinda Elementary School
- Earlington Heights Elementary School
- Charles Drew Elementary School

=== Middle schools ===
- Brownsville Middle School
- Charles Drew Middle School
- Miami Springs Middle School
- Georgia Jones-Ayers Middle School

=== High schools ===
- Miami Northwestern Senior High School
- Miami Jackson Senior High School
- Miami Springs Senior High School

=== Libraries ===
Miami-Dade Public Library operates area public libraries:

- Model City Library

== Transportation ==
Brownsville is served by Miami-Dade Transit along major thoroughfares via Metrobus, and by the Miami Metrorail, Tri-Rail, and Amtrak at:

Metrorail:

- Brownsville (North 54th Street and West 27th Avenue)
- Dr. Martin Luther King Jr. Plaza (North 62nd Street and West 27th Avenue)

Tri-Rail:

- Tri-Rail/Metrorail Transfer (North 79th Street and West 37th Avenue)
- Hialeah Market (North 41st Street and NW 38th Avenue)

Amtrak:

- Amtrak-Miami: Silver Star and Silver Meteor service, (North 79th Street and West 37th Avenue)
