= Coral Way =

Neighborhood within Miami, Florida, US

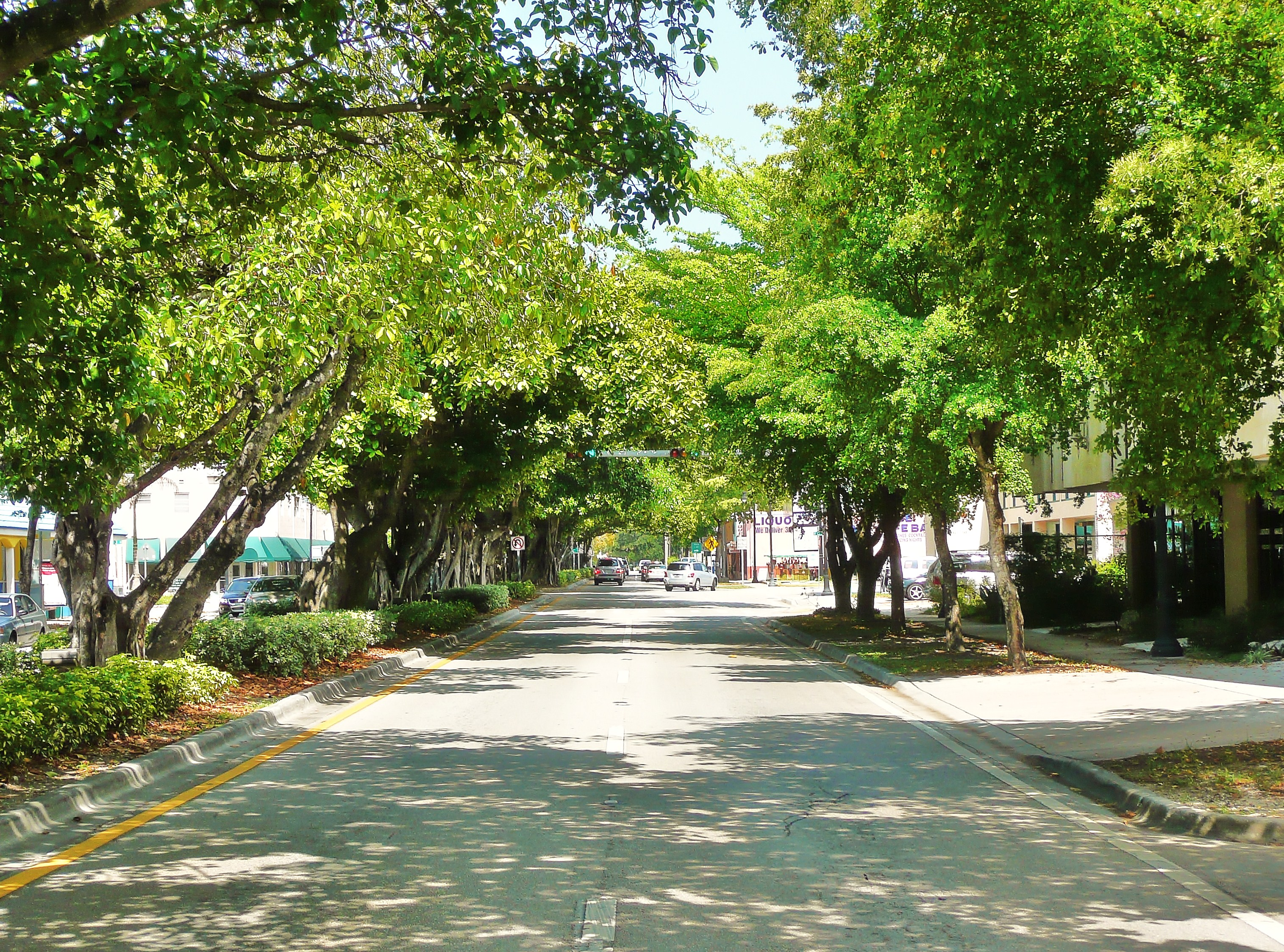
Coral Way in Coral Gables, Florida, April 2010

Coral Way is a neighborhood within Miami, Florida that is defined by Coral Way, a road established by Coral Gables founder George E. Merrick during the 1920s. It is located in Miami-Dade County, Florida.

The Coral Way neighborhood is served by the Miami Metrorail at Vizcaya (South Dixie Highway/US 1 and West First Avenue) and Coconut Grove stations (US 1 and West 27th Avenue/SR 9).

== History ==
The architecture in the Coral Way neighborhoods reflects the early-20th century. Some of the older sections contain a mixture of Mission Revival Style architecture and bungalow homes of the 1920s, along with the Art Deco style from the 1930s and the modest post-World War II dwellings.

The Coral Way area is best known for its historic urban boulevard along SW 22nd Street (Coral Way). One of the main thoroughfares between Coral Gables and the City of Miami, Coral Way passes through the City of Miami between SW 37th Avenue and Brickell Avenue. The Coral Way Corridor began in 1922 with citrus lined streets; later growing to have streetcar tracks down the center of the road, connecting Downtown Miami to Coral Gables. In 1929, a Roadside Beautification Program was started, and 1,200 banyan trees were planted along the median of the boulevard. Today, Coral Way remains one of the more beautiful corridors in South Florida.

== Geography ==
The sub-neighborhoods within Coral Way include: Shenandoah, Silver Bluff, Vizcaya-Roads, Coral Gate, Parkdale-Lyndale, South Miami, Bryan Park, and Golden Pines.

=== Coral Gate ===
Coral Gate is a smaller sub-neighborhood within the larger Coral Way neighborhood. It is roughly located south of SW 16th Street, east of SW 37th Avenue, north of Coral Way and west of SW 32nd Avenue. Coral Gate borders Coral Gables to the west and Golden Pines to the south. The north and east boundaries of Coral Gate are enclosed by walls or street barriers with all vehicles blocked from entering or exiting through these directions.

=== Golden Pines ===
Golden Pines is a smaller sub-neighborhood within the larger Coral Way neighborhood. It is located east of Coral Gables], bound by SW 22 St (north), South Dixie Highway. (south), 27 Ave (east) and 37 Ave (west). It is located at 25.734°N 80.242°W, with an elevation 10 feet (3.0 m).

=== Shenandoah ===
Shenandoah is an important neighborhood in Miami, boasting a large number of houses from the 1920s and 1930s and rich in revivalist Architecture . It is located directly south of Little Havana, between SW 9th (north) Street and Coral Way (south), SW 27th Avenue (west) and SW 12th Avenue (east). It is located at 25.76°N 80.222°W, with an elevation 10 feet (3.0 m).

=== Silver Bluff ===
Silver Bluff is a smaller sub-neighborhood within the larger Coral Way neighborhood. It is located south of Coral Way (SW 22nd Street), west of SW 17th Avenue, east of SW 27th Avenue and north of South Dixie Highway. Much of this territory was the "City of Silver Bluff", which was annexed into the City of Miami in 1926. It is located at 25.749°N 80.236°W, with an elevation 10 feet (3.0 m).

== Demographics ==
As of 2000, Coral Way had a population of 55,951 and 69,041 residents, with 21,363 households, and 14,105 families residing in the city. The median household income was $37,168.89. The racial makeup of the neighborhood was 81.10% Hispanic or Latino of any race, 0.41% Black or African American, 17.28% White (non-Hispanic), and 1.21% other races (non-Hispanic).

The zip codes for Coral Way include 33129, 33133, 33135, and 33145. The area covers 6.697 square miles (17.35 km^{2}). As of 2000, there were 32,879 males and 36,162 females. The median age for males were 38.6 years old, while the median age for females were 43.3 years old. The average household size had 2.5 people, while the average family size had 3.1 members. The percentage of married-couple families (among all households) was 42.3%, while the percentage of married-couple families with children (among all households) was 15.7%, and the percentage of single-mother households (among all households) was 7.1%. The percentage of never-married males 15 years old and over was 14.6%, while the percentage of never-married females 15 years old and over was 12.1%.

As of 2000, the percentage of people that speak English not well or not at all made up 35.8% of the population. The percentage of residents born in Florida was 19.4%, the percentage of people born in another U.S. state was 8.1%, and the percentage of native residents but born outside the U.S. was 2.1%; the percentage of foreign-born residents was 70.4%.

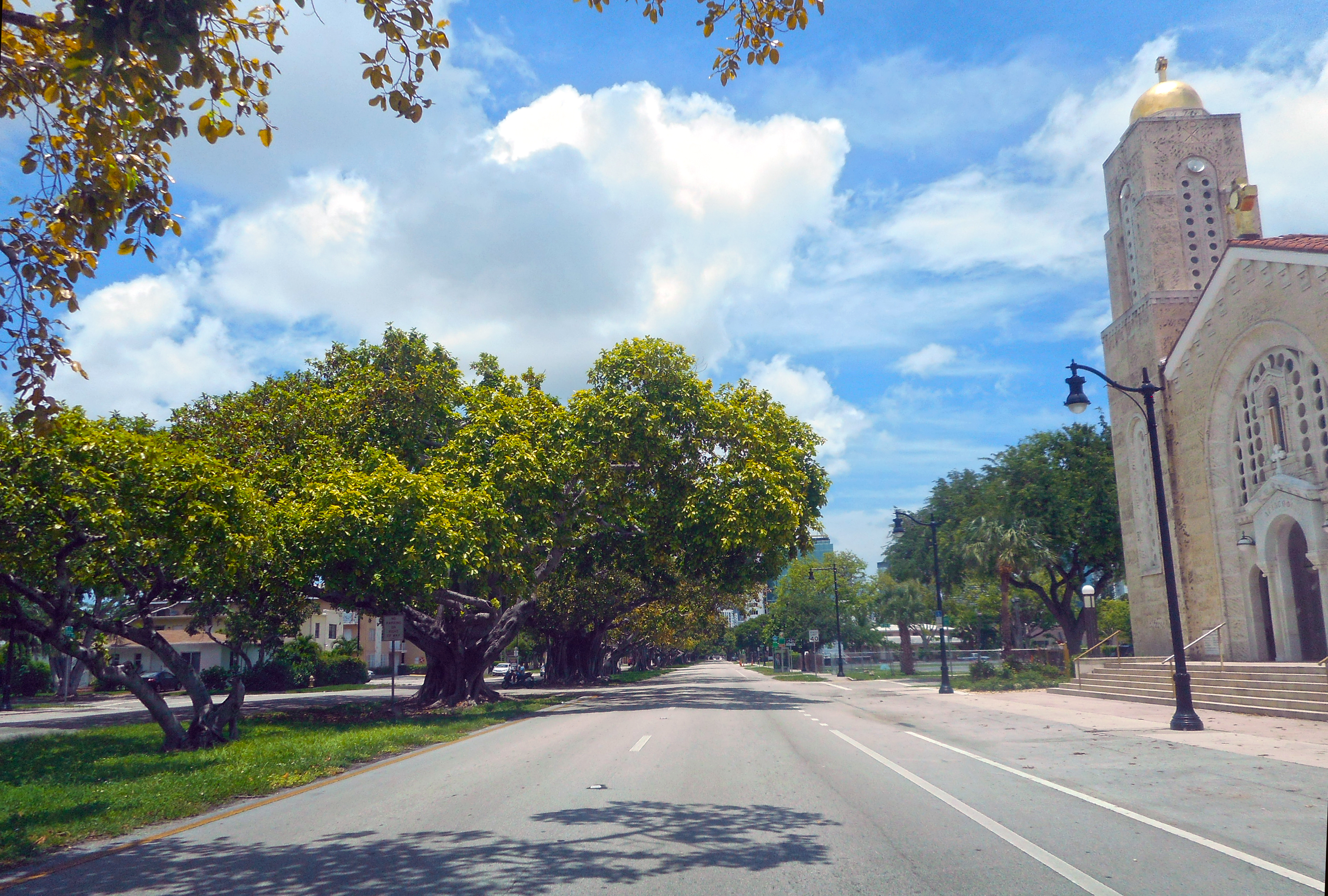
Coral Way with St. Sophia Orthodox Church

== Economy ==
The Consulate-General of Costa Rica in Miami is located in Suite 401 at 2730 SW 3rd Avenue in Coral Way.

== Transportation ==
Coral Way is served by Metrobus throughout the area, and by the Miami Metrorail at:

- Vizcaya (SW 32nd Road and U.S. 1)
- Coconut Grove (SW 27th Avenue and U.S. 1)
- Douglas Road (SW 37th Avenue and U.S. 1)

== Education ==
Miami-Dade County Public Schools operates area public schools:

=== Public schools ===
==== Elementary schools ====
- Silver Bluff Elementary School
- Frances S. Tucker Elementary School
- Coral Way K-8 Center
- Merrick Educational Center

==== Middle schools ====
- Coral Way K-8 Center

==== Adult education ====
- The English Center

=== Private schools ===
- José Martí Schools
- Lincoln Martí School
- Brito Miami Private School

== Parks ==
- Douglas Park
- Coral Gate Park
- Cuban Memorial Boulevard Park
- Woodlawn Park Cemetery
