= Allapattah station =

Miami-Dade Transit metro station

●● Allapattah
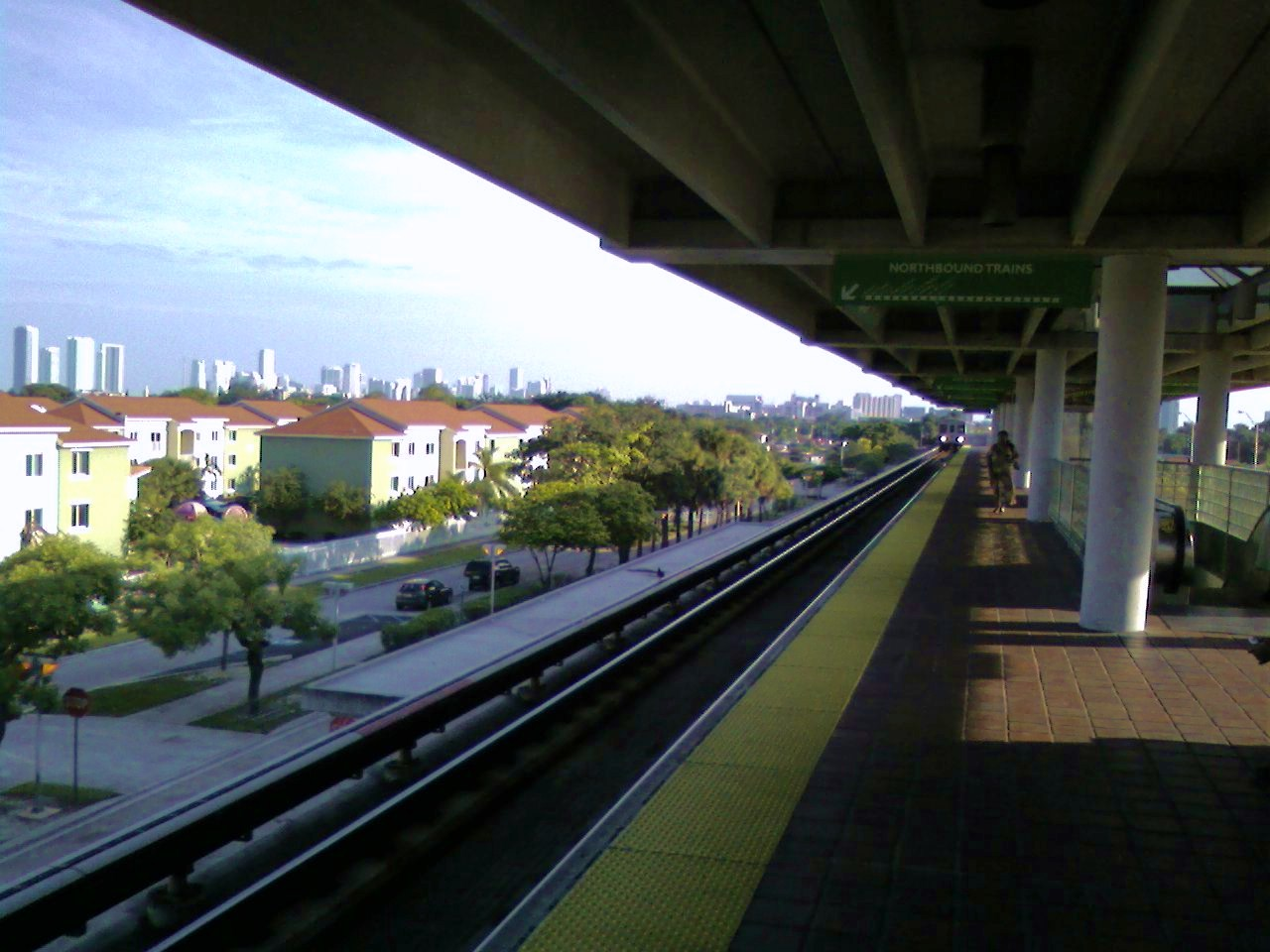
- Northbound train entering the station, Downtown Miami visible left-background

General information
- Location: 3501 NW 12th Avenue; Miami, Florida
- Coordinates: 25°48′31″N 80°12′56″W
- Owner: Miami-Dade County
- Platforms: 1 island platform
- Tracks: 2
- Connections: Metrobus: 12, 21, 36, 95, 401

Construction
- Parking: Park and ride (66 spaces)
- Accessible: Yes

Other information
- Station code: ALP

History
- Opened: December 17, 1984

Passengers
- 2011: 541,000 ▲6%

Services
Preceding station	Miami-Dade Transit	Following station
Santa Clara toward Dadeland South	Green Line	Earlington Heights toward Palmetto
Santa Clara toward Dadeland South	Orange Line	Earlington Heights toward Miami Int'l Airport
Location

Allapattah station is a Metrorail station in the Allapattah neighborhood of Miami, Florida.

This station is located near the intersection of Northwest 12th Avenue (State Road 933) and 36th Street/US 27 (SR 25). It was opened to service December 17, 1984. This is the northernmost Metrorail station within the Miami city limits.

== Station layout ==
The station has two tracks served by an island platform.

== Places of interest ==
- Wynwood and Design District (one mile due east via Metrobus)
