= Vue at Brickell =

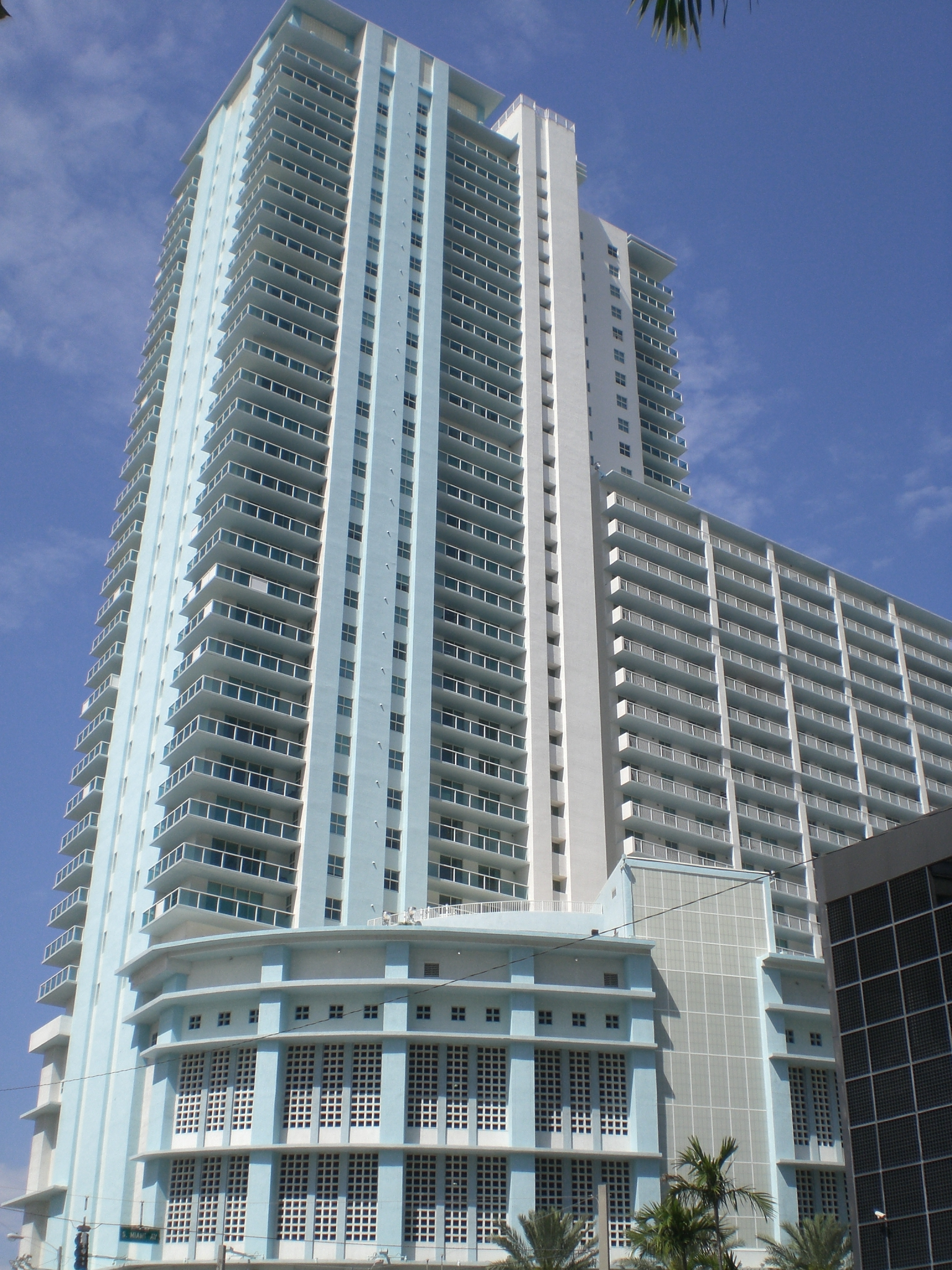
- Vue at Brickell
- Interactive map of the Vue at Brickell area

General information
- Type: Residential
- Location: 1200 South Miami Avenue, Miami, Florida, United States
- Coordinates: 25.76188°N 80.1936°W
- Construction started: 2001
- Completed: 2004
- Opening: 2004

Height
- Roof: 423 ft (129 m)

Technical details
- Floor count: 37

Vue at Brickell is a residential tower in the Brickell district of Miami, Florida. Built in 2004, it is part of the recent building boom in Miami. The building consists of condominiums, as well as restaurants and other retail stores. It contains 37 floors, and is 423 ft (129 m) tall. The address is 1250 South Miami Avenue. The building is located near the Mary Brickell Village shopping area, on South Miami Avenue between 12th and 13th (Coral Way) Streets. It is located in the southwestern Brickell Financial District, about three blocks west of Biscayne Bay.

== See also ==
- List of tallest buildings in Miami
