= Okeechobee station =

Okeechobee station may refer to:

- Okeechobee station (Amtrak), a train station in Okeechobee, Florida, serving Amtrak
- Okeechobee station (Metrorail), a train station in Hialeah, Florida, serving Metrorail
