= Allapattah =

- Neighborhood of Miami
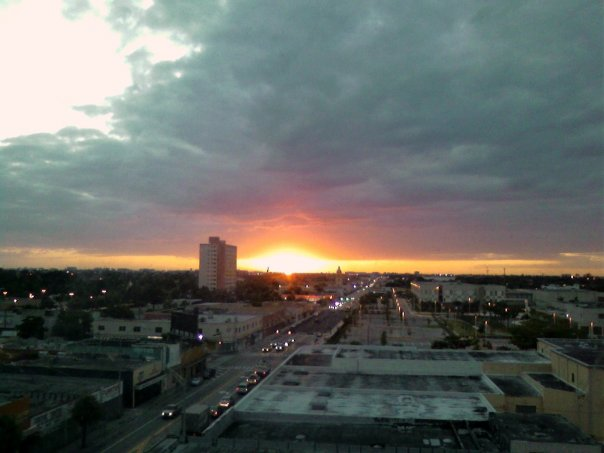
- Westward view of Allapattah and North 36th Street (US 27) with historic Miami Jackson Senior High School visible right-center
- Nicknames: A. P., Little Santo Domingo
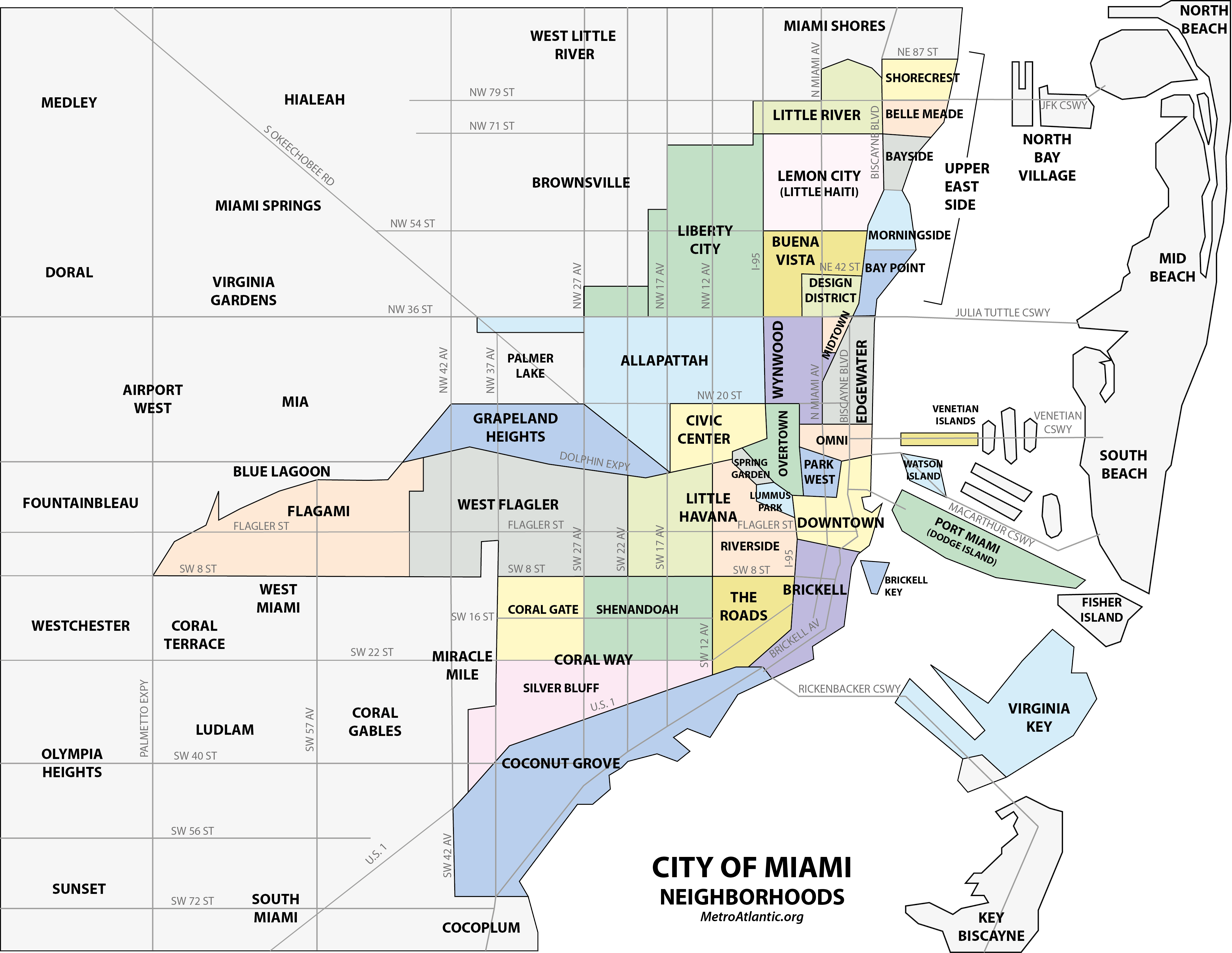
- Allapattah neighborhood within the City of Miami
- Coordinates: 25.815°N 80.224°W
- Country: United States
- State: Florida
- County: Miami-Dade County
- City: Miami
- Settled: 1856
- Annexed into the City of Miami: 1925

Government
  - City of Miami Commissioner: Alex Diaz de la Portilla
  - Miami-Dade Commissioners: Eileen Higgns
  - House of Representatives: Luis R. Garcia Jr. (D), Cynthia Stafford (D), and Carlos Lopez-Cantera (R)
  - State Senate: Shevrin Jones (D) and Ileana Garcia (R)
  - U.S. House: Maria Elvira Salazar (R) and Frederica Wilson (D)
- Elevation: 10 ft (3.0 m)

Population (2010)
  - Total: 54,289
  - Density: 11,399/sq mi (4,401/km^{2})
- Time zone: UTC-05 (EST)
- ZIP Code: 33125, 33127, 33142
- Area codes: 305, 786
- Website: Allapattah neighborhood

Allapattah is a neighborhood, located mostly in the city of Miami, Florida in metropolitan Miami. As of May 2011, the county-owned portion of Allapattah, from State Road 9 to LeJeune Road, is being annexed by the city proper.

A stretch in the neighborhood along NW 17th Avenue was nicknamed Little Santo Domingo in 2003, in an effort spurred by former Miami mayor and longtime city commissioner Wilfredo "Willy" Gort to honor the sizable Dominican American population in the community.

== History ==
The name is derived from the Seminole Indian language word meaning alligator. The initial settlement of the Allapattah community began in 1856 when William P. Wagner, the earliest documented white American permanent settler, arrived from Charleston, South Carolina and established a homestead on a hammock along the Miami Rock Ridge, where Miami Jackson High School presently stands. Development ensued from 1896 and into the 20th century in the area with the completion of the Florida East Coast Railroad (FEC).

While most of Allapattah was populated by whites until the late 1950s, an African American neighborhood named Railroad Shops Colored Addition existed between NW 46th Street to the south and NW 50th Street to the north, from NW 12th Avenue on the east to NW 14th Avenue on the west. The neighborhood had been established at the end of the 19th century when the Florida East Coast Railroad built servicing facilities nearby. In the late 1940s the entire neighborhood was condemned under eminent domain, and the residents forced to leave. The area was used as a site for a new white school (originally named Allapattah Elementary, since renamed Lenora B. Smith Elementary in honor of an educator who once lived in the Railroad Shops neighborhood) and a park.

There was a large influx of black Americans displaced by the construction of I-95 (then, the North-South Expressway) into Allapattah in the 1950s and 1960s, leading to white flight to suburban Miami-Dade County and Broward County. Cubans migrated to Miami neighborhoods like Allapattah in large numbers following the Cuban Revolution of 1959, hosting one of Miami's largest Cuban American populations. The 1980s brought influxes of Dominican Americans, Nicaraguans, Hondurans, and Haitians in the aftermath of various refugee crises in those nations. Now, a melting pot of residents from all across the Caribbean, Central America, Latin America more broadly, and African Americans who historically lived throughout the South, reside in the area.

== Geography ==
Allapattah is northwest of downtown, and about five miles (8 km) east of Miami International Airport. It is located at 25.815°N 80.224°W, with an elevation of 10 feet (3.0 m).

Many of the businesses and educational institutions in the neighborhood are generally located on Northwest 36th Street (US 27). The boundaries are roughly the Airport Expressway (SR 112) to the north, the Miami River and the Dolphin Expressway (SR 836) to the south, I-95 to the east, and Northwest 27th Avenue (SR 9) to the west.

== Economy ==
A textiles market is located along Northwest 20th Street between Northwest 17th and 27th Avenues, with several garment manufacturing and wholesale outlets from Latin America and the Caribbean makers along the row. The Produce Market, serves local supermarkets and bodegas with the freshest variety of South Florida produce, tropical fruits and many other products.

The industrial district of the city of Miami is located in an area straddling the Health District and Allapattah, along a former FEC corridor just north of Northwest 20th Street. Trades ranging from clothing manufacturers, auto repair, carpentry and upholstery shops. Additionally, several shipyards and dry docks located along the neighborhood's banks of the Miami River.

== Education ==
Miami-Dade County Public Schools operates all area public schools:

=== Public schools ===
==== Elementary schools ====
- Comstock Elementary School
- Maya Angelou Elementary School
- Santa Clara Elementary School
- Melrose Elementary School
- River Cities Community Charter School

==== Middle and high schools ====
- Mater Academy Middle School of International Studies (charter)
- Brownsville Middle School
- Georgia Jones Ayers Middle School
- Miami Springs Middle School
- Miami Jackson Senior High School
- Miami Springs Senior High School
- Miami Northwestern Senior High School

=== Libraries ===
Miami-Dade Public Library operates all area public libraries:

- Allapattah Library
- Medical Center Library

== Demographics ==
As of 2000, Allapattah had a population between 40,406 and 43,860 residents, with 12,508 households, and 8,224 families residing in the neighborhood. The median household income was $19,141.53. The racial makeup of the neighborhood was 72.23% Hispanic or Latino of any race, 18.33% Black or African American, 6.89% White (non-Hispanic), and 2.55% Other races (non-Hispanic).

The zip codes for Allapattah include 33136, 33125, 33127, and 33142. The area covers 4.653 square miles (12.05 km^{2}). As of 2000, there were 23,967 males and 19,894 females. The median age for males was 33.9 years old, while the median age for females was 36.0 years old. The average household size had 2.8 people, while the average family size had 3.4 members. The percentage of married-couple families (among all households) was 36.4%, while the percentage of married-couple families with children (among all households) was 16.6%, and the percentage of single-mother households (among all households) was 14.5%. 8.0% of the population were in correctional institutions, 1.0% of the population were in nursing homes, and 1.2% of the population were in other group homes. The percentage of never-married males 15 years old and over was 24.5%, while the percentage of never-married females 15 years old and over was 12.4%.

As of 2000, the percentage of people that speak English not well or not at all made up 33.0% of the population. The percentage of residents born in Florida was 30.5%, the percentage of people born in another U.S. state was 9.2%, and the percentage of native residents but born outside the U.S. was 4.3%, while the percentage of foreign born residents was 56.1%.

== Transportation ==
Allapattah is served by Metrobus throughout the area, and by the Miami Metrorail at:

- Santa Clara (NW 20th Street and NW 12th Avenue)
- Allapattah (US 27 and NW 12th Avenue)
- Civic Center (NW 15th Street and NW 12th Avenue)
- Earlington Heights (SR 112 and NW 22nd Avenue)

== Places of interest ==
- Miami Jackson Senior High School (founded 1898)
- Allapattah Library
- Juan Pablo Duarte Park
- Evergreen Memorial Cemetery
