= Santa Clara station (Metrorail) =

Miami-Dade Transit metro station

●● Santa Clara
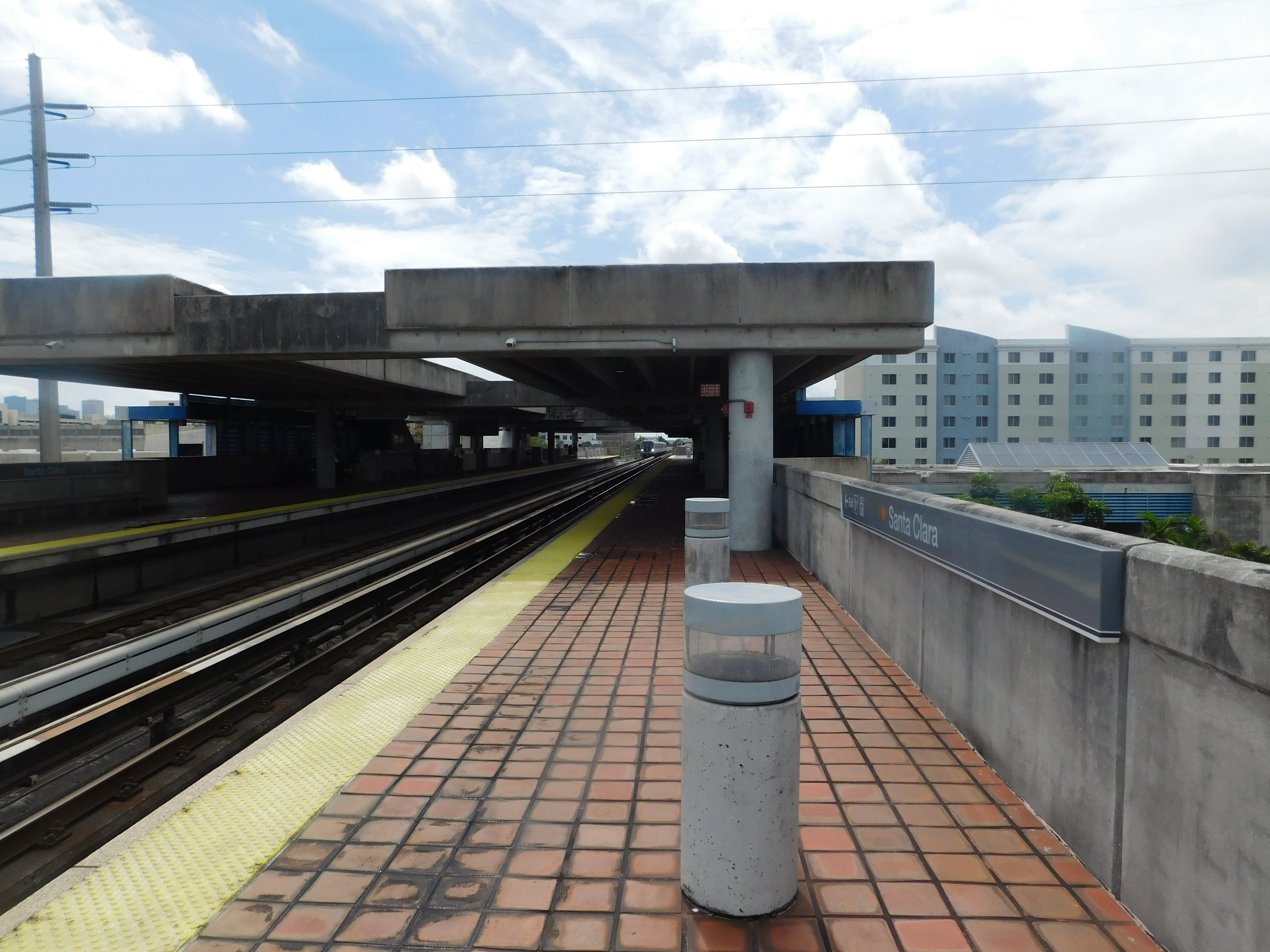
- Santa Clara station platform

General information
- Location: 2050 NW 12 Avenue; Miami, Florida
- Coordinates: 25°47′45″N 80°12′55″W
- Owner: Miami-Dade County
- Platforms: 2 side platform
- Tracks: 2
- Connections: Metrobus: 12, 20, 21, 32, 95, 401

Construction
- Parking: 17-story garage (61 first level spaces)
- Accessible: Yes

Other information
- Station code: SCL

History
- Opened: December 17, 1984

Passengers
- 2011: 218,000 ▲8%

Services
Preceding station	Miami-Dade Transit	Following station
UHealth–Jackson toward Dadeland South	Green Line	Allapattah toward Palmetto
UHealth–Jackson toward Dadeland South	Orange Line	Allapattah toward Miami Int'l Airport
Location

Santa Clara station is a station on the Metrorail rapid transit system in the industrial district of the Allapattah neighborhood in Miami, Florida. This station is located near the intersection of Northwest 12th Avenue (State Road 933) and 20th Street. It opened to service December 17, 1984. Along with Brownsville station, Santa Clara is generally the lowest ridership station on the system.

== Station layout ==
The station has two tracks served by side platforms. Access to the station is from the southwest corner of Northwest 21st Street and Northwest 12th Avenue.

== Places of interest ==
- Miami Dade College (Medical Center Campus)
- University of Miami Life Science & Technology Park
- Lindsey Hopkins Technical Education Center
- Santa Clara Apartments, transit-oriented development
