= Hialeah station =

Hialeah station may refer to:

- Hialeah station (Metrorail), a train station served by Metrorail in Hialeah, Florida
- Hialeah Seaboard Air Line Railway Station, a former train station in Hialeah, Florida
