= Douglas Road station =

Miami-Dade Transit metro station

●● Douglas Road
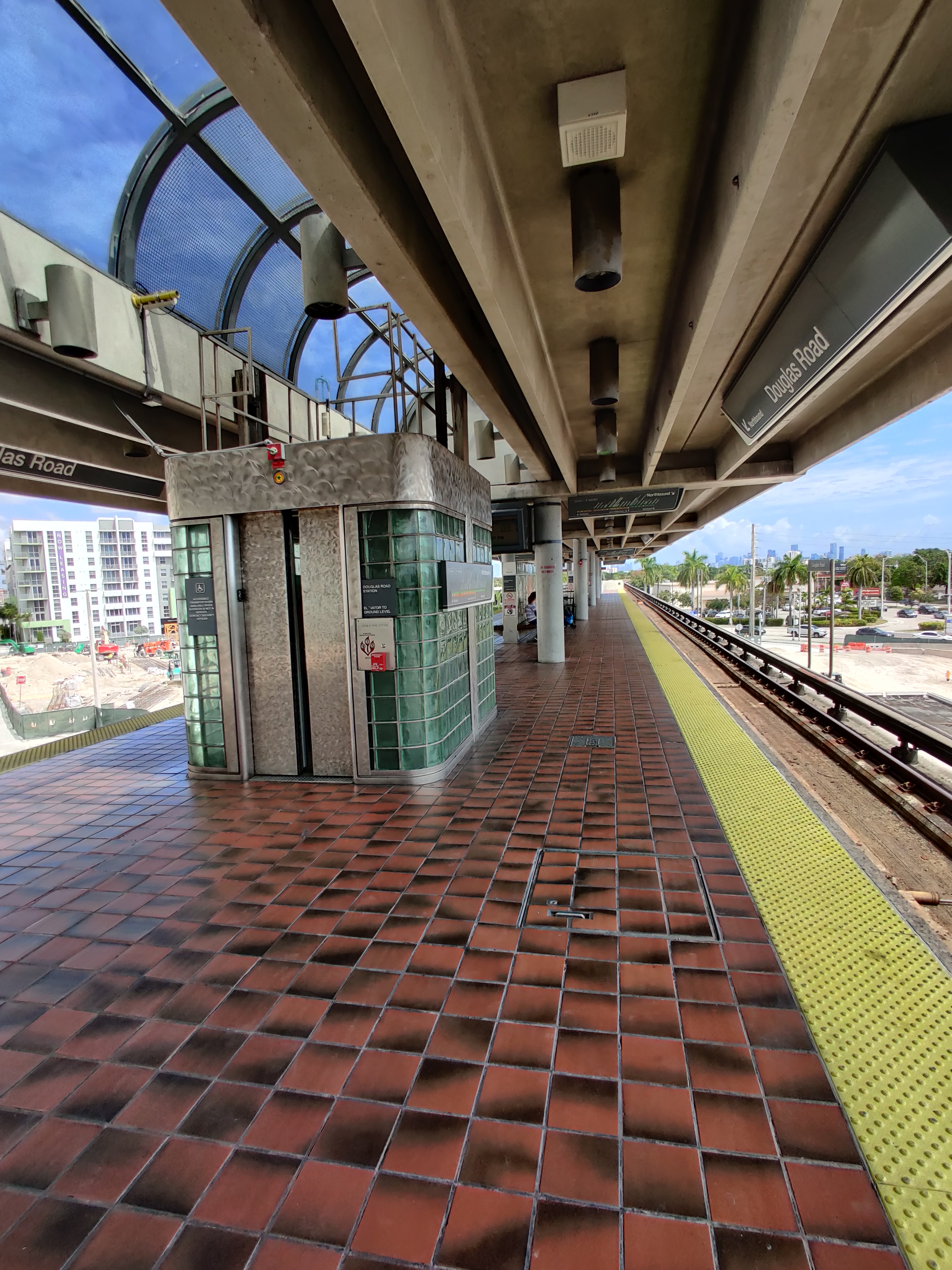
- Station platform (Design before 2023)

General information
- Location: 3100 South Douglas Road; Coral Gables, Florida
- Coordinates: 25°43′57″N 80°15′17″W
- Owner: Miami-Dade County
- Platforms: 1 island platform
- Tracks: 2
- Connections: Metrobus: 37, 40, 42, 136, 400

Construction
- Parking: Park and ride (226 spaces)
- Accessible: Yes

Other information
- Station code: DRD

History
- Opened: May 20, 1984

Passengers
- 2012: 1.3 million ▲18%

Services
| Preceding station | Miami-Dade Transit | Following station |
|---|---|---|
| University toward Dadeland South | Green Line | Coconut Grove toward Palmetto |
| University toward Dadeland South | Orange Line | Coconut Grove toward Miami Int'l Airport |
Location

Douglas Road station is a station on the Metrorail rapid transit system just southwest of Coconut Grove, in Miami, Florida. It is the southernmost Metrorail station in Miami city limits, although it has a Coral Gables address. The station is located at the intersection of Douglas Road (West 37th Avenue) and South Dixie Highway (US 1), three blocks south Bird Road (SW 40th Street). It opened to service May 20, 1984.

In the early 2020s, several large transit-oriented residential buildings were built around the station, including The Link at Douglas, with towers over 440 feet (130 m) high.

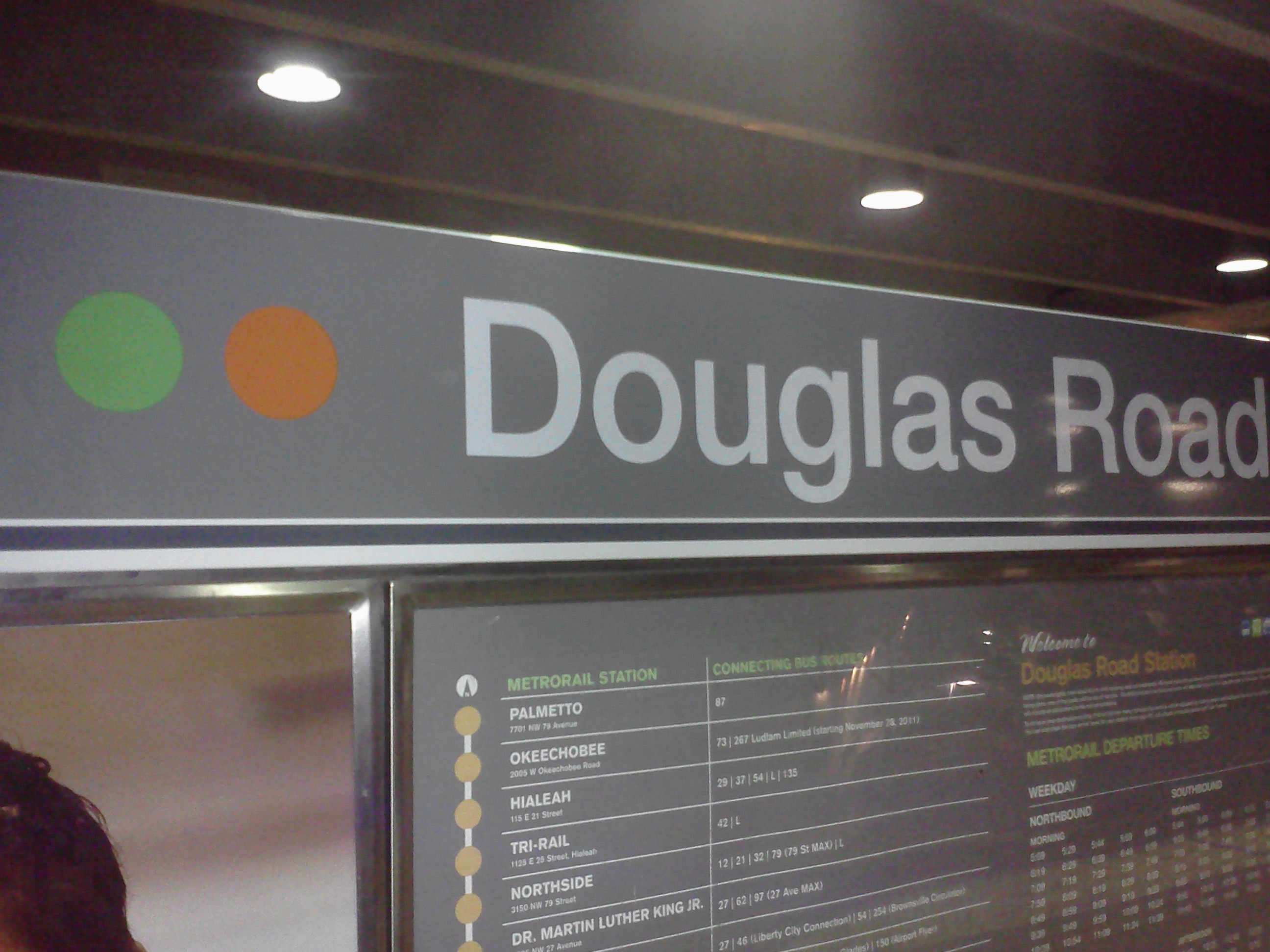
Station platform livery

== Station layout ==
The station has two tracks served by an island platform, with a parking lot northwest of the platform.
