= Hialeah station (Metrorail) =

Miami-Dade Transit metro station

● Hialeah
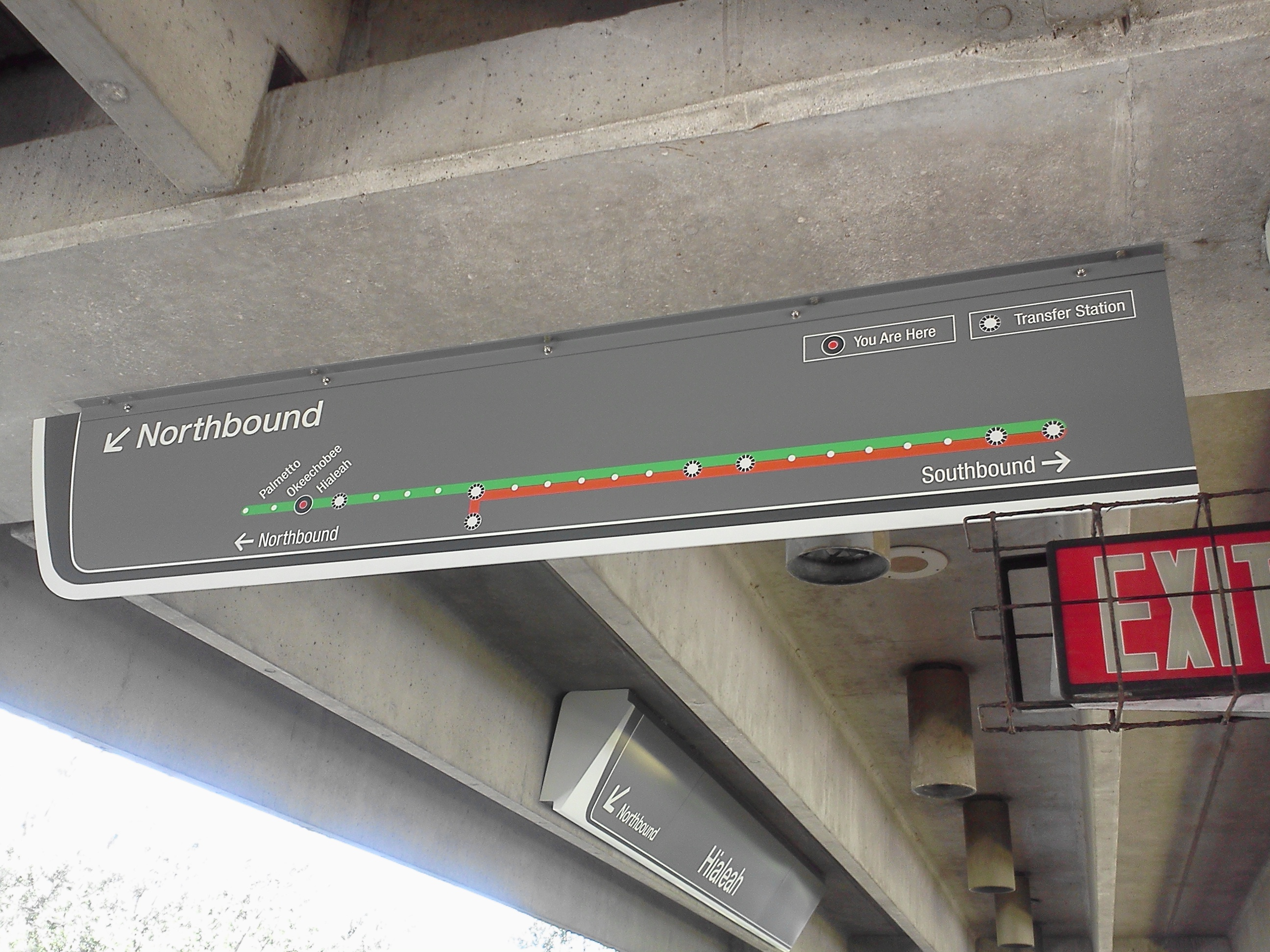
- Northbound platform map at the station

General information
- Location: 125 East 21st Street; Hialeah, Florida
- Coordinates: 25°50′27″N 80°16′44″W
- Owner: Miami-Dade County
- Platforms: 1 island platform
- Tracks: 2
- Connections: Metrobus: 37, 54, 79

Construction
- Parking: Park and ride (321 spaces)
- Accessible: Yes

Other information
- Station code: HIA

History
- Opened: May 19, 1985

Passengers
- 2011: 492,000 ▲7%

Services
Preceding station	Miami-Dade Transit	Following station
Tri-Rail toward Dadeland South	Green Line	Okeechobee toward Palmetto
Location

Hialeah station is a Metrorail rapid transit station in Hialeah, Florida. The station is located at the intersection of East First Avenue and 21st Street (SR 934), just south of Hialeah Park Race Track. It was opened to service May 19, 1985.

== Station layout ==
The station has two tracks and an island platform, with parking underneath the tracks on either side of the station.

== Places of interest ==
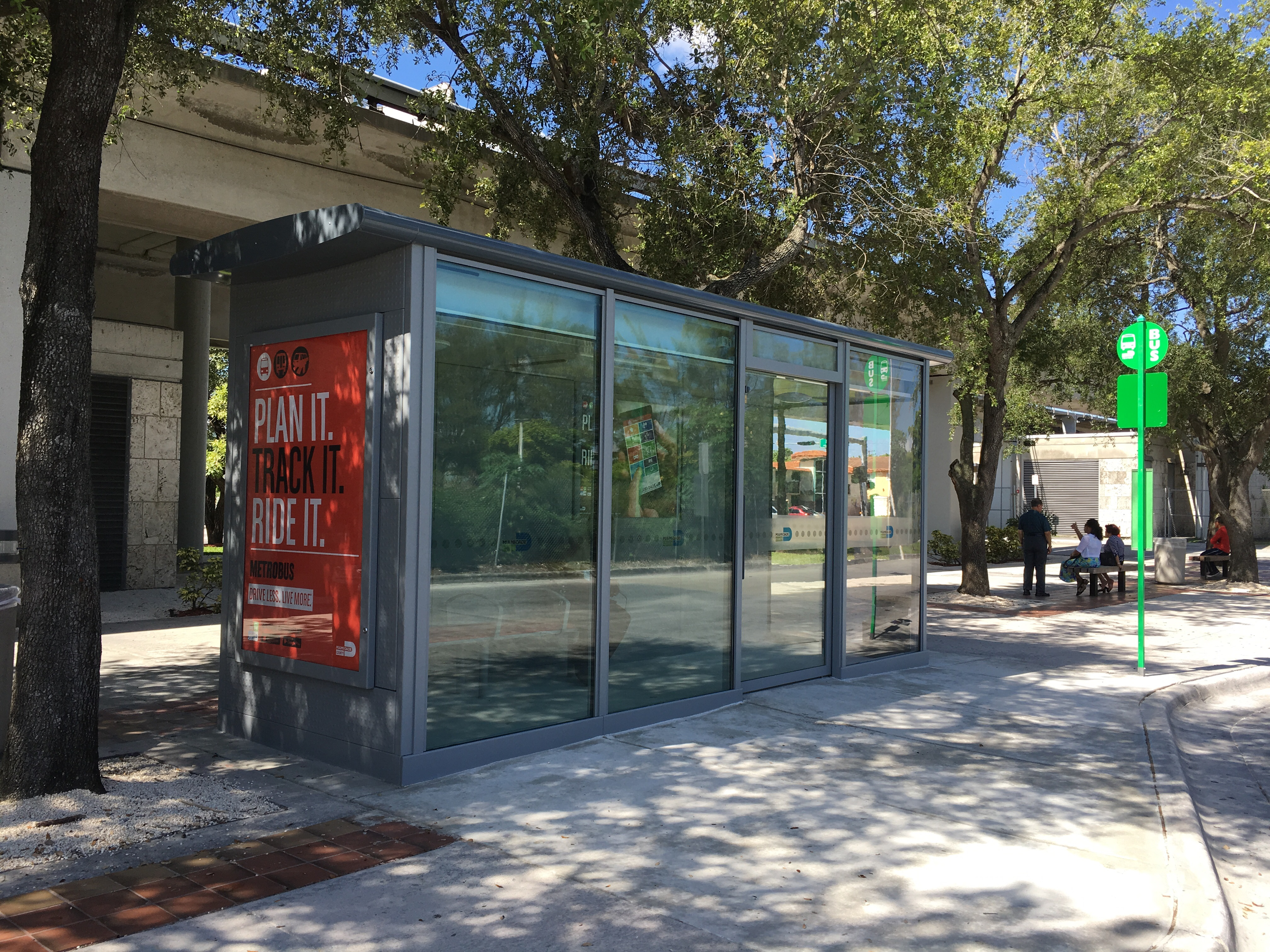
Air conditioned bus stop added in 2016

- Hialeah
- Hialeah Park Race Track
