= Easy Card =

Public transit smart card used in the Miami, Florida Metropolitan Area

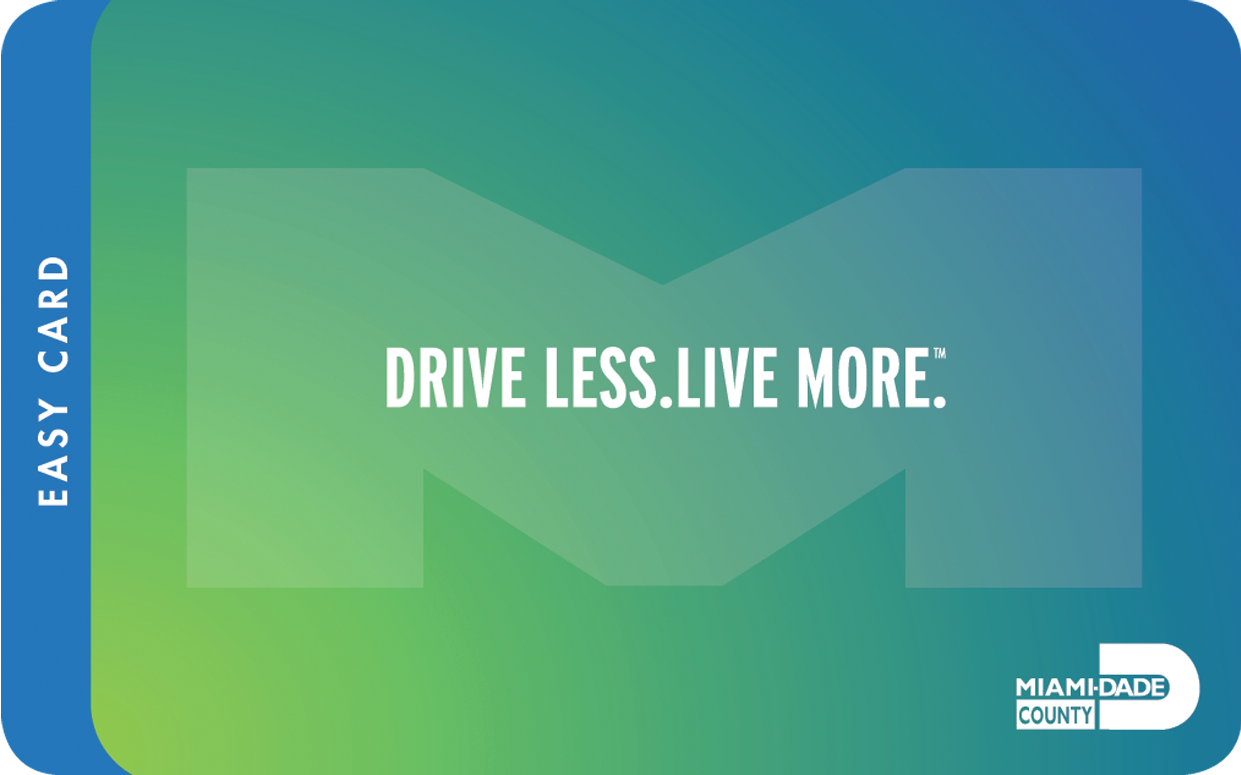
- Location: South Florida metropolitan area, Florida, United States
- Launched: October 1, 2009; 16 years ago
- Technology: Contactless smart card
- Operator: Cubic Transportation Systems
- Manager: Miami-Dade Transit
- Currency: USD ($150 maximum load)
- Stored-value: Cash value
- Credit expiry: After card/ticket expiration date
- Auto recharge: Automatic replenishment
- Validity: Metrorail (Miami); Tri-Rail; Metrobus
- Retailed: Online; Telephone; Selected resellers; Train stations
- Variants: Easy Card (20-year lifetime; older cards 3 years); Easy Ticket (60-day lifetime); Corporate/Employee, Disabled, Student, & Senior Reduced Fare; Golden & Patriot Passports
- Website: transitstore.miamidade.gov

The Easy Card (stylized as EASY Card) is a contactless smart card system for public transit fares in the Miami metropolitan area. The Easy Card is valid on Metrobus and Metrorail services in Miami-Dade County, and on Tri-Rail services throughout the region. Easy Card payments were introduced in 2009 on Miami-Dade Transit services, and expanded to Tri-Rail in 2011. The card functions as a stored-value card, and can also be loaded with unlimited-ride passes. Reduced-fare and zero-fare versions of the Easy Card are available for eligible customers, including seniors and individuals with disabilities.

The Easy Card technology was developed by Cubic Transportation Systems, replacing paper tickets and tokens on Metrobus, Metrorail, and Tri-Rail services. Technology upgrades to the Easy Card system since 2019 have enabled contactless credit card payments and fare capping on Metrorail and Metrobus services.

== Variants ==
Multiple variants of the Easy Card are available. The standard Easy Card is a stored-value smart card, which can be loaded with up to $150 of value. Monthly passes for Tri-Rail and Miami-Dade Transit services can also be loaded to the Easy Card. Registered Easy Cards are eligible for balance protection, which replaces the value of the card if it is lost or stolen.

Easy Tickets, a limited-use, disposable variant of the Easy Card, are also available. Easy Tickets can be purchased with a single ride fare, a pass, or a cash value of up to $40, and cannot be reloaded. Easy Tickets are made of paper, and are valid for 60 days after purchase.

Reduced-fare Easy Cards are available for K-12 school students and Medicare recipients. Discounted monthly passes are also available for employees of participating employers, and students of most South Florida universities. The Golden Passport and Patriot Passport variations of the Easy Card are available to seniors and veterans respectively, and provide free travel on Miami-Dade Transit and discounted fares on Tri-Rail.

== Acceptance ==
Easy Cards and Easy Tickets are accepted on the following systems:

- Metrobus (Miami-Dade County)
- Metrorail (Miami-Dade County)
- Tri-Rail (Miami-Dade, Broward, Palm Beach Counties)

Easy Cards and Tickets are the only method of payment on Metrorail. To ride Metrorail and Tri-Rail, passengers must tap their Easy Card when entering and exiting the system. Metrobus passengers are not required to tap the card when exiting the bus.

Transfers between Tri-Rail, Metrorail, and Metrobus services are automatically calculated, including any applicable fare difference. Broward County Transit and Palm Tran services do not accept the Easy Card. Metrobus lines that connect with BCT services issue paper transfers upon request, and Tri-Rail ticket machines print tickets for Easy Card users connecting to BCT and Palm Tran.

Proposals have been made to integrate the Easy Card with additional regional transit services. Expansion to Broward County Transit and Palm Tran was seriously considered in 2014, and again in 2017, but no agreement has been reached as of 2024.

== History ==
Miami-Dade Transit issued a request for proposal for a new fare payment system in late 2007. From the beginning of the planning process, the new fare system was envisioned as a regional system for Miami-Dade Transit, Tri-Rail, Broward County Transit, and Palm Tran. Cubic Transportation Systems was selected as the provider of the system in 2008, at a base price of $42 million.

The new fare system, branded as the EASY Card, was launched in October 2009, following an extensive marketing campaign in English, Spanish, and Haitian Creole. The Easy Card replaced paper bus transfers, magnetic-stripe monthly passes, and tokens, and introduced new discount programs for companies purchasing passes for their employees. The Easy Card also integrated payment for parking at rail stations, allowing passengers to pay for their parking and their fare in a single purchase.

The Easy Card became the only method of payment for Metrorail after its introduction. The system was expanded to Tri-Rail in 2011, partially fulfilling the goal of a regional fare system. On Metrobus, cash payments remained an option, but the Easy Card quickly became popular among bus passengers. By late 2010, 70% of bus rides on Metrobus were paid for with an Easy Card. The popularity of the new fare payment system was accompanied by criticism, as The Miami Times highlighted the limited number of locations that sold cards, and raised concerns about the privacy of passengers' data.

Miami-Dade Transit has made a series of upgrades to the Easy Card system since its introduction. In 2016, MDT approved a $33 million contract with Cubic to operate the system for another 10 years, and upgrade it for contactless credit card payments. The upgrades also moved the system's accounting functions to the cloud. Contactless credit card payments and fare capping became available on Metrorail in 2019, and on Metrobus in 2020.

As of 2024, the Easy Card remains in use on Miami-Dade Transit and Tri-Rail services. The planned rollout to Broward County Transit and Palm Tran services was abandoned in the mid-2010s, and Palm Tran introduced its own Paradise Pass smart card system in 2021.

== Easy Pay and contactless payments ==
In addition to the Easy Card system, Miami-Dade Transit implemented a system called Easy Pay for download via App Store or Google Play which allows payment of transit fares, and soon college easy ticket, using a smartphone. Once a fare has been purchased and activated, a QR code is generated containing the fare that can be scanned at selected turnstiles or shown to bus drivers.

Additional features that are in the application include 7-day, 1-day, eventually college easy tickets, and monthly passes, along with the ability to reload and view balance of an Easy Card.

Implemented in August 2019, riders are able to use their Visa, Mastercard, or American Express contactless credit/debit cards, Apple Pay, Google Pay, and Samsung Pay at the fare gates on the Metrorail. As of February 2020, contactless bank cards and digital wallets are also accepted on Metrobuses.
