= Shenandoah (Miami) =

Neighborhood of Miami, Florida

Shenandoah is one of the oldest neighborhoods in the city of Miami, Florida. It was established in 1919 by developers from Virginia, hence the name. The "Shenandoah" area was farmland and piney wood until the real-estate boom of the 1920s, when one residential subdivision after another bearing the name "Shenandoah" as part of its title appeared.

The modern borders of the neighborhood are Calle Ocho to the north, Coral Way to the south, SW 12th Ave to the east and SW 27th Ave to the west. Shenandoah is home to many revivalist architecture homes and buildings, such as Shenandoah Middle School and many homes in the area closer to Calle Ocho.

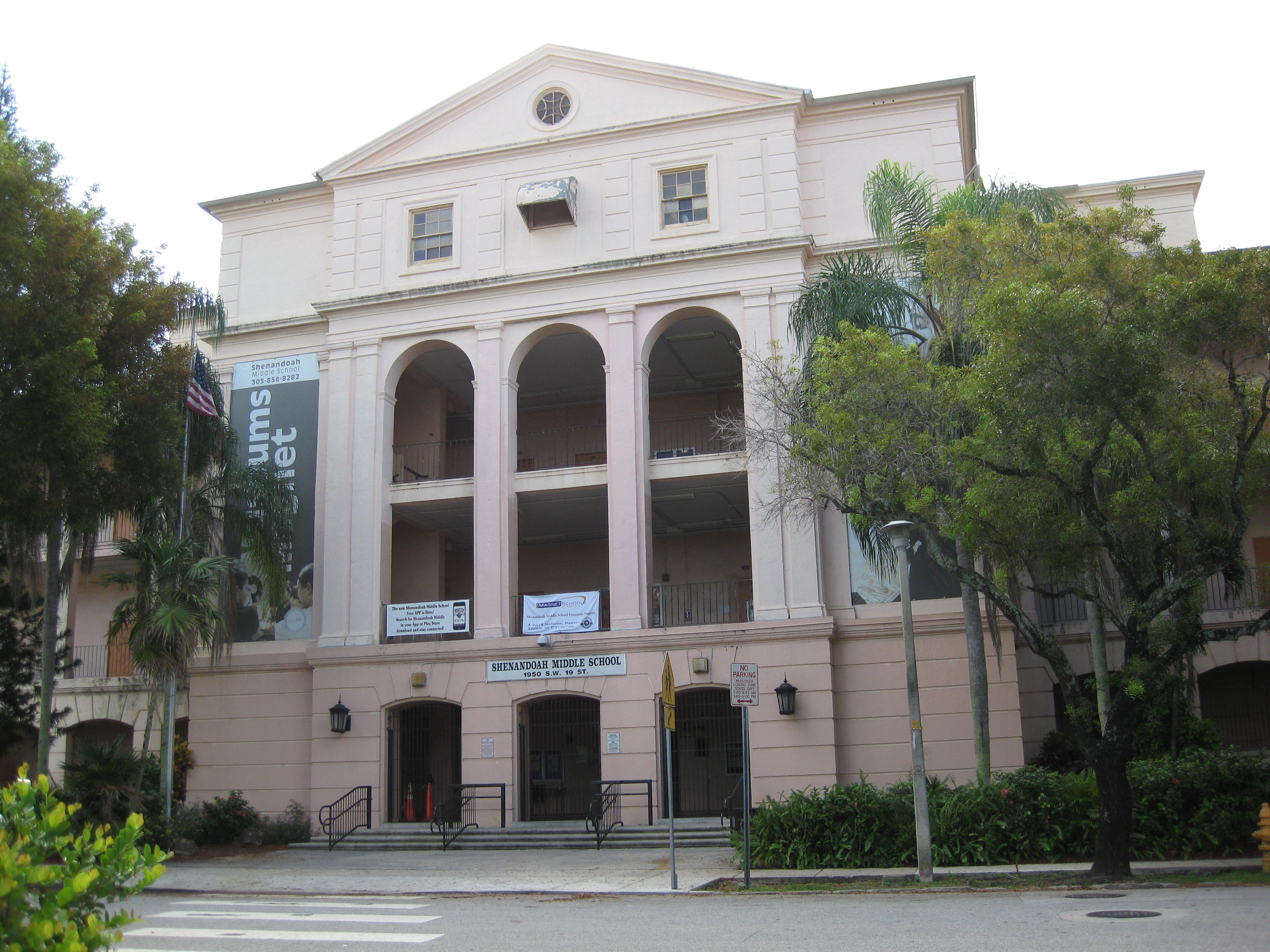
Shenandoah Middle School

== Education ==
Miami-Dade County Public Schools operates the area's public schools:

=== Elementary school ===
- Shenandoah Elementary School

=== Middle school ===
- Shenandoah Middle School

== Libraries ==
Miami-Dade Public Library System operates this public library:

- Shenandoah Library

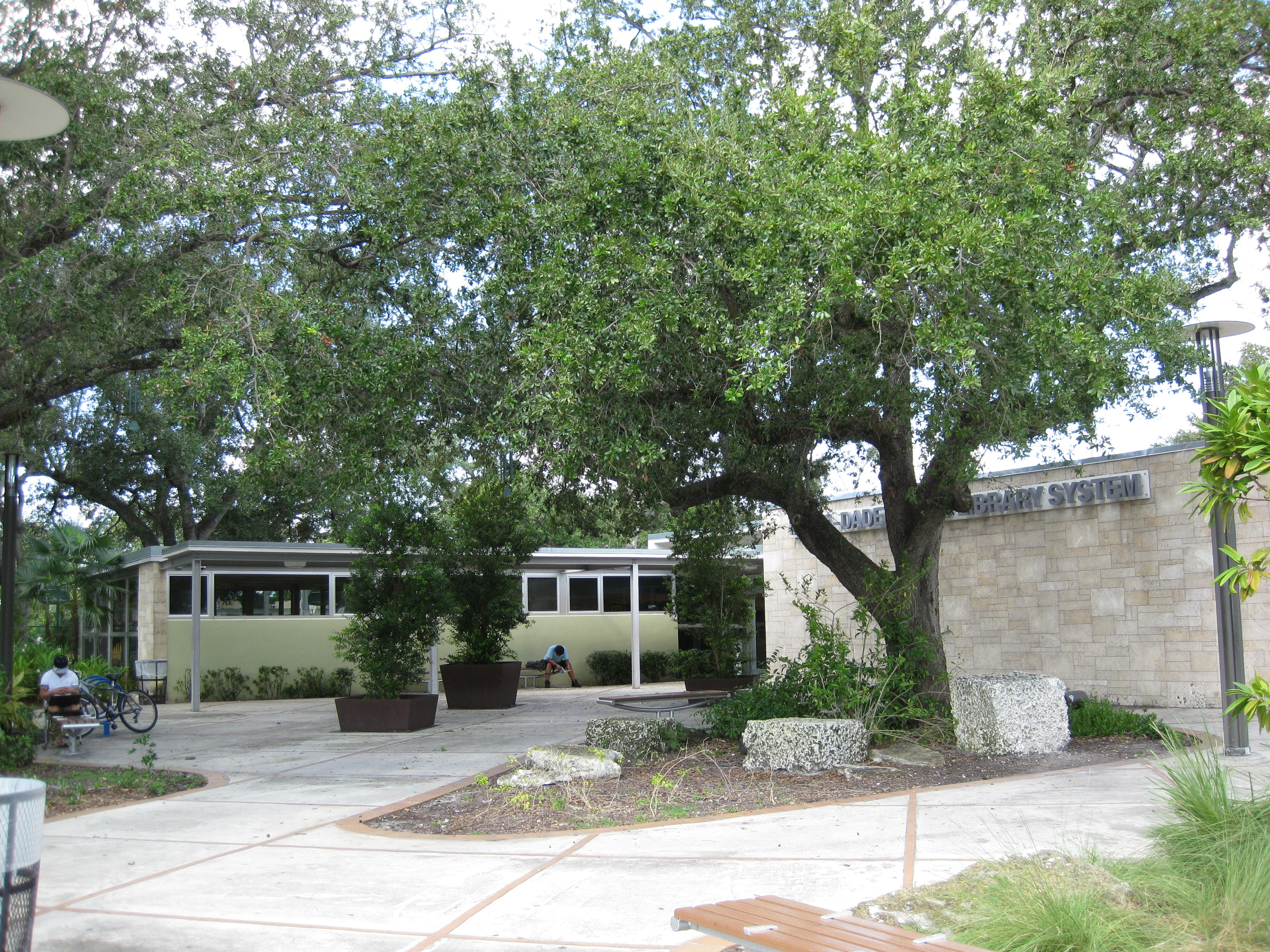
Shenandoah Public Library

== Parks ==
- Shenandoah Park

== See also ==
- Coral Way
- Miami Shenandoah Neighborhood Association
