= Vizcaya station =

Miami-Dade Transit metro station

●● Vizcaya
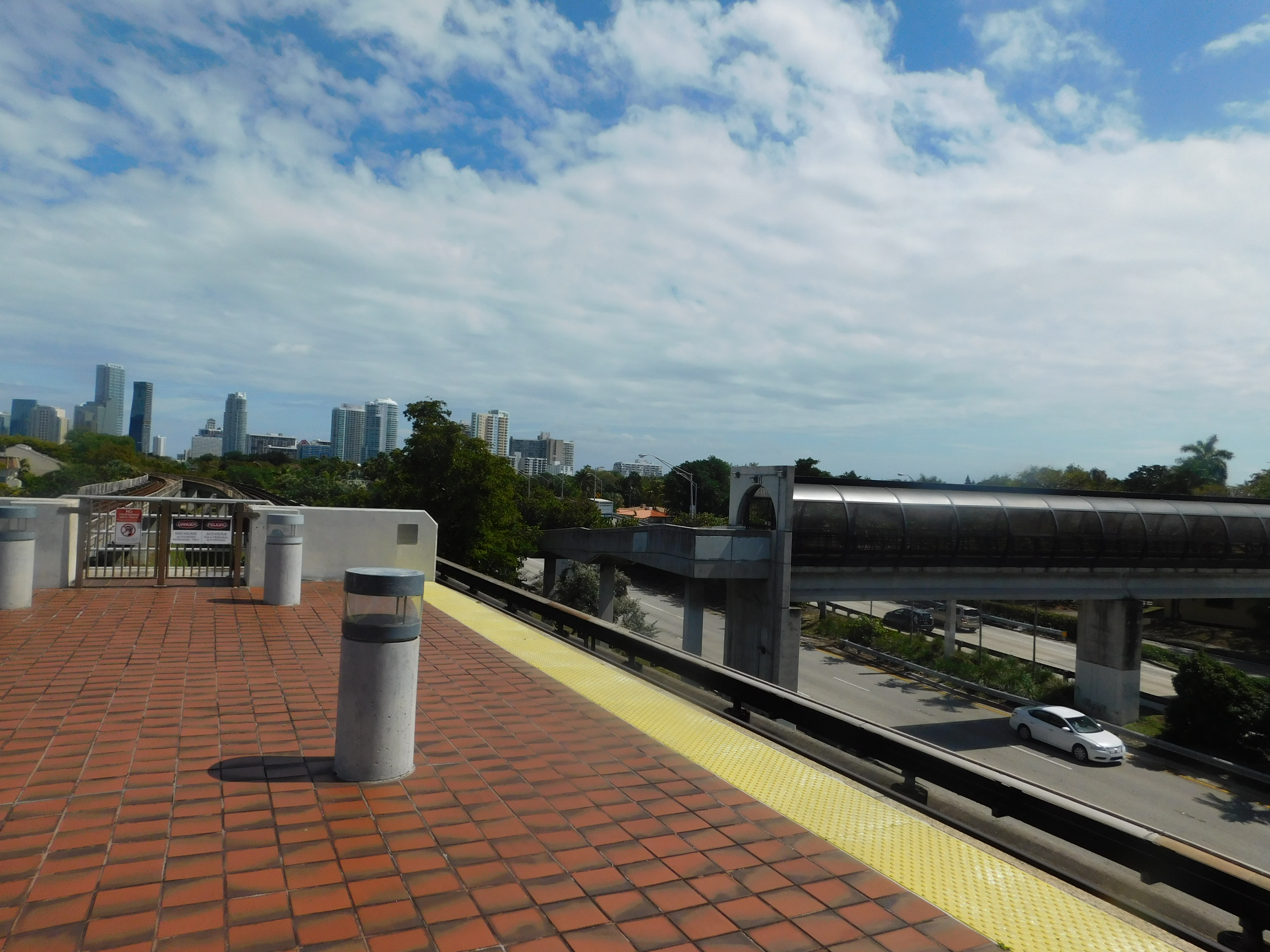
- Vizcaya station, March 2020

General information
- Location: 3201 SW First Avenue; Miami, Florida
- Coordinates: 25°44′59″N 80°12′42″W
- Owner: Miami-Dade County
- Platforms: 1 island platform
- Tracks: 2
- Connections: Metrobus: 12, 17, 24, 400; UM ‘Canes Shuttle

Construction
- Parking: Park and ride (93 spaces)
- Cycle facilities: 24 lockers
- Accessible: Yes

Other information
- Station code: VIZ

History
- Opened: May 20, 1984

Passengers
- 2011: 374,000 ▲4%

Services
Preceding station	Miami-Dade Transit	Following station
Coconut Grove toward Dadeland South	Green Line	Brickell toward Palmetto
Coconut Grove toward Dadeland South	Orange Line	Brickell toward Miami Int'l Airport
Location

Vizcaya station is a station on the Metrorail rapid transit service station in The Roads neighborhood of Miami, Florida. The station is located near the intersection of Southwest First Avenue and 32nd Road, adjacent to the national southern terminus of I-95 at South Dixie Highway (US 1), two blocks southeast of Coral Way.

The Vizcaya station opened May 20, 1984 and features a pedestrian bridge over the US 1/I-95 junction for access to the Vizcaya Museum and Gardens and residences east of the highway.

== Station layout ==
The station has two tracks served by an island platform with a parking lot immediately north of the station platform.
