= Coconut Grove station =

Miami-Dade Transit metro station in Florida

●● Coconut Grove
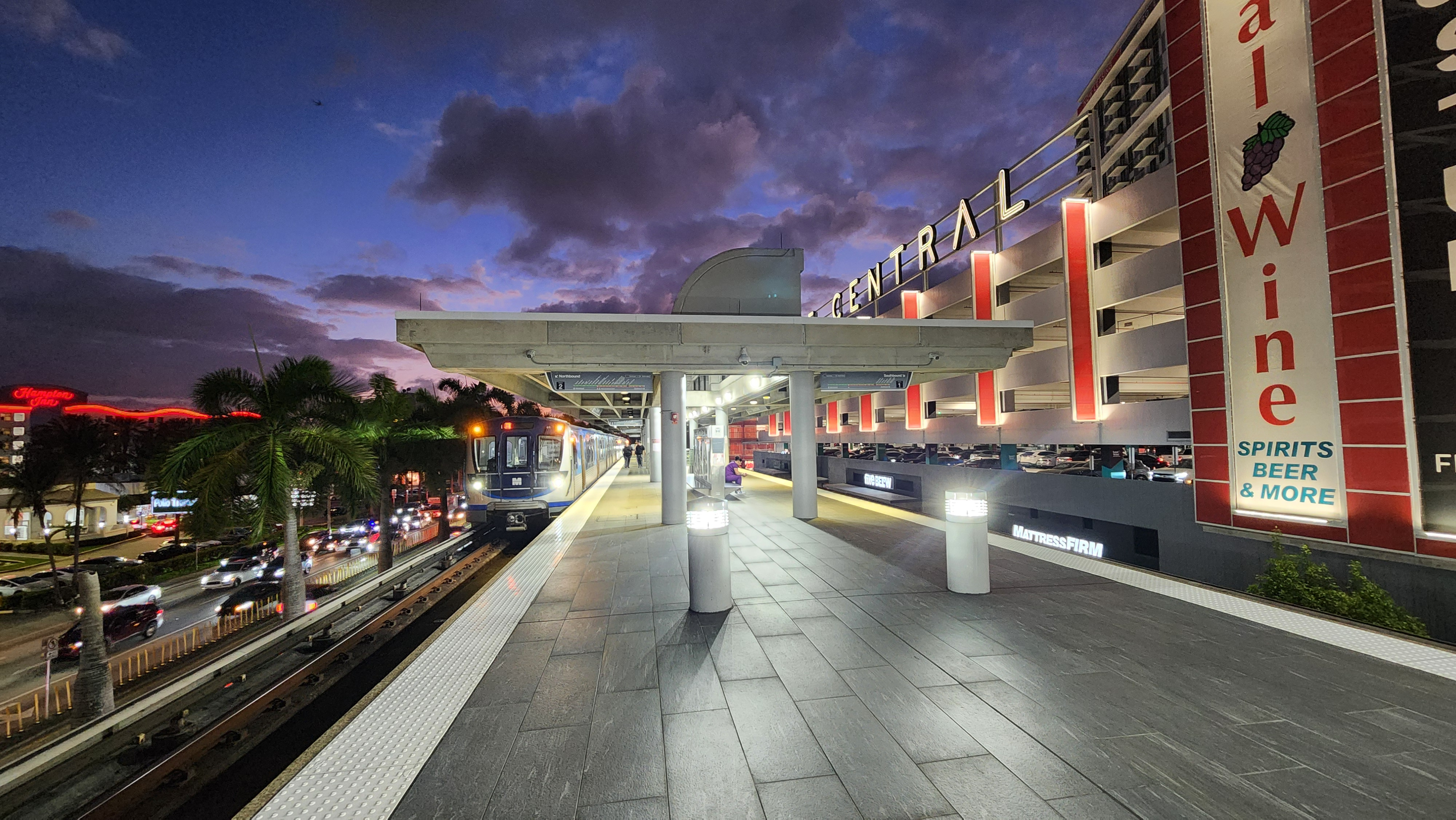
- Platform

General information
- Location: 2780 SW 27th Avenue; Miami, Florida
- Coordinates: 25°44′23″N 80°14′19″W
- Owner: Miami-Dade County
- Platforms: 1 island platform
- Tracks: 2
- Connections: Metrobus: 22, 27, 400

Construction
- Parking: Park and ride (204 spaces)
- Accessible: Yes

Other information
- Station code: CGV

History
- Opened: May 20, 1984
- Rebuilt: 2025

Passengers
- 2011: 550,000 ▲6%

Services
Preceding station	Miami-Dade Transit	Following station
Douglas Road toward Dadeland South	Green Line	Vizcaya toward Palmetto
Douglas Road toward Dadeland South	Orange Line	Vizcaya toward Miami Int'l Airport
Location

Coconut Grove station is a station on the Metrorail rapid transit system on the western end of the Coconut Grove neighborhood of Miami, Florida. The station is located at the intersection of South Dixie Highway (US 1) and West 27th Avenue/Grapeland Boulevard (SR 9), opening to service on May 20, 1984.

In 2018, there were plans to make the station entirely solar-powered. The station closed on January 21, 2025 for renovations, and opened again in late May.

== Station layout ==
The station has two tracks served by an island platform. Immediately north of the platform lies a mixed-use development called Grove Central, with apartments, retail and a parking garage including parking specifically for the station.
