= Okeechobee station (Metrorail) =

Miami-Dade Transit metro station

● Okeechobee

General information
- Location: 2005 West Okeechobee Road; Hialeah, Florida
- Coordinates: 25°50′23″N 80°18′5″W
- Owner: Miami-Dade County
- Platforms: 1 island platform
- Tracks: 2
- Connections: Metrobus: 73, 183

Construction
- Parking: 1,207 spaces
- Accessible: Yes

Other information
- Station code: OKE

History
- Opened: May 19, 1985

Passengers
- 2011: 381,000 0%

Services
| Preceding station | Miami-Dade Transit | Following station |
|---|---|---|
| Hialeah toward Dadeland South | Green Line | Palmetto Terminus |
Location

Okeechobee station is a Metrorail station in Hialeah, Florida. The station is located at the intersection of West 20th Street and Okeechobee Road (US 27), one block south of the Hialeah Expressway (SR 934). It opened to passenger service on May 19, 1985, and was previously the northwestern terminus of the Metrorail system until Palmetto station opened in 2003.

== Station layout ==
The station has two tracks and an island platform, with parking underneath the tracks on either side of the station.

== Places of interest ==
- Hialeah and Hialeah Gardens
- Medley
- Miami Springs
- Miami-Dade Warehouse District
