= Metrobus (Miami-Dade County) =

Bus network in Miami-Dade County, Florida, USA

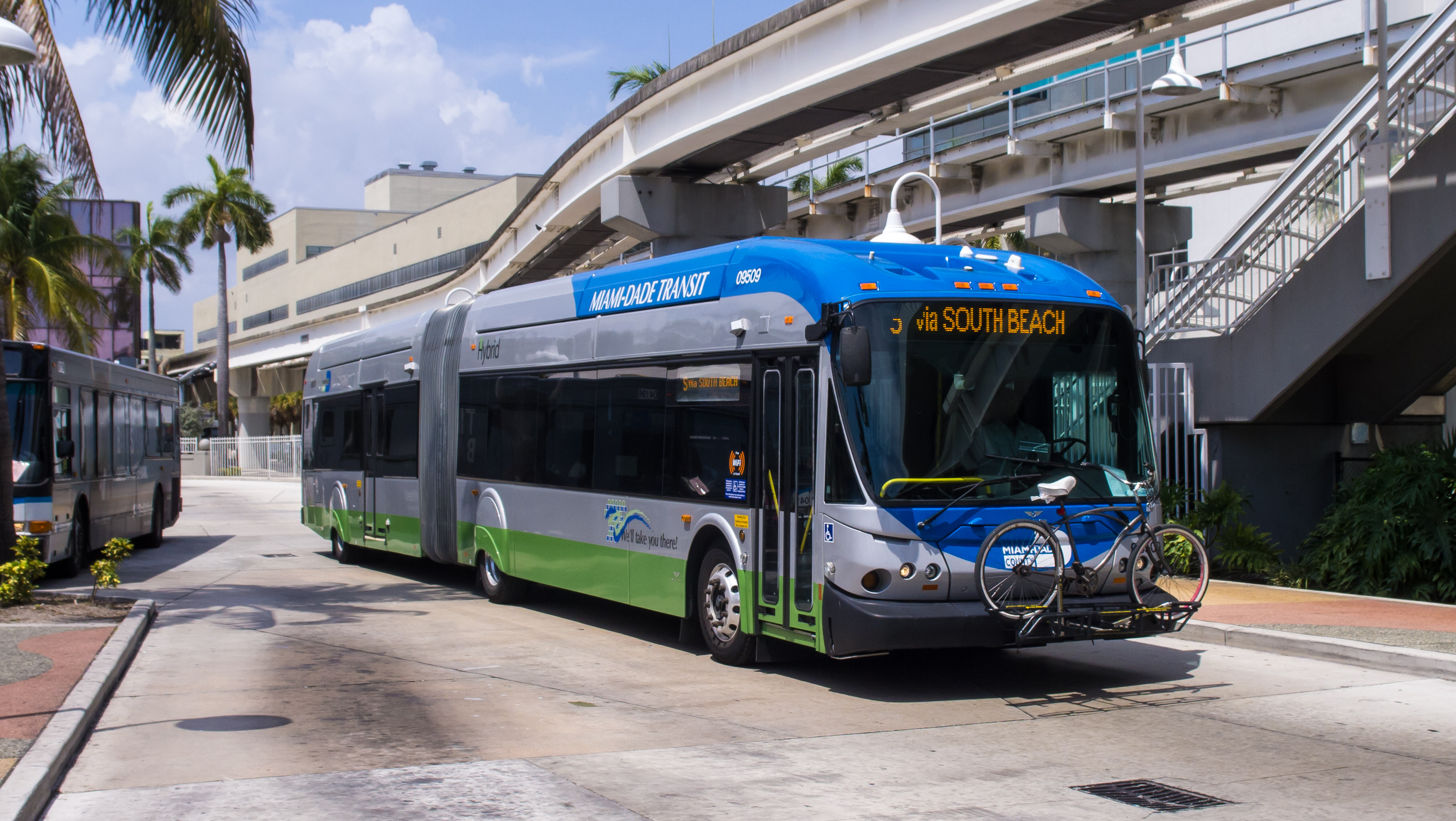
- S (now 100) Route at Adrienne Arsht Center Metromover station
- Parent: Miami-Dade County
- Founded: August 2, 1960
- Headquarters: Overtown Transit Village
- Locale: Miami, Florida
- Service area: Greater Miami, Broward, and Monroe Counties
- Service type: Bus; Bus rapid transit
- Alliance: Broward County Transit
- Routes: 95
- Stops: over 8,000
- Fleet: 800+ buses: 40ft and 60ft NABI; 30ft and 40ft Gillig; 40ft Proterra (2022); 40ft and 60ft New Flyer; Buses
- Daily ridership: 171,600 (weekdays, Q2 2026)
- Annual ridership: 56,482,500 (2025)
- Fuel type: Diesel; Diesel-electric; Electric; CNG
- Operator: Miami-Dade Transit
- Chief executive: Stacy L. Miller, P.E.
- Website: miamidade.gov/transit

The Metrobus network is a bus system in Miami-Dade County, Florida, operated by Miami-Dade Transit. It consists of 95 routes connecting most points in the county and part of southern Broward County as well. As of 2025, the system has 56,482,500 rides per year, or about 171,600 per day in the second quarter of 2026.

Seven routes operate around the clock: Routes 3, 11, 27, 77, 79 (No 24-hour service to Hialeah, all trips terminate at Northside Station), 100 and 602. Routes 246 Night Owl & Route 500 Midnight Owl operate from midnight to 5 am. Other routes operate from 4:30 am to 1:30 am. All Metrobuses are wheelchair accessible, in compliance with the Americans with Disabilities Act of 1990 and equipped with Bicycle racks.

Bus route 301 (Dade-Monroe Express) extends into Monroe County, reaching Marathon, where a transfer is available to a Key West Transit bus proceeding further into the Keys. With the appropriate bus transfers, one can travel all the way from Key West to Sebastian entirely on public-transit buses. Metrobus has many connections to Metrorail and Metromover, also operated by Miami-Dade Transit, mainly in the city of Miami.

== History ==
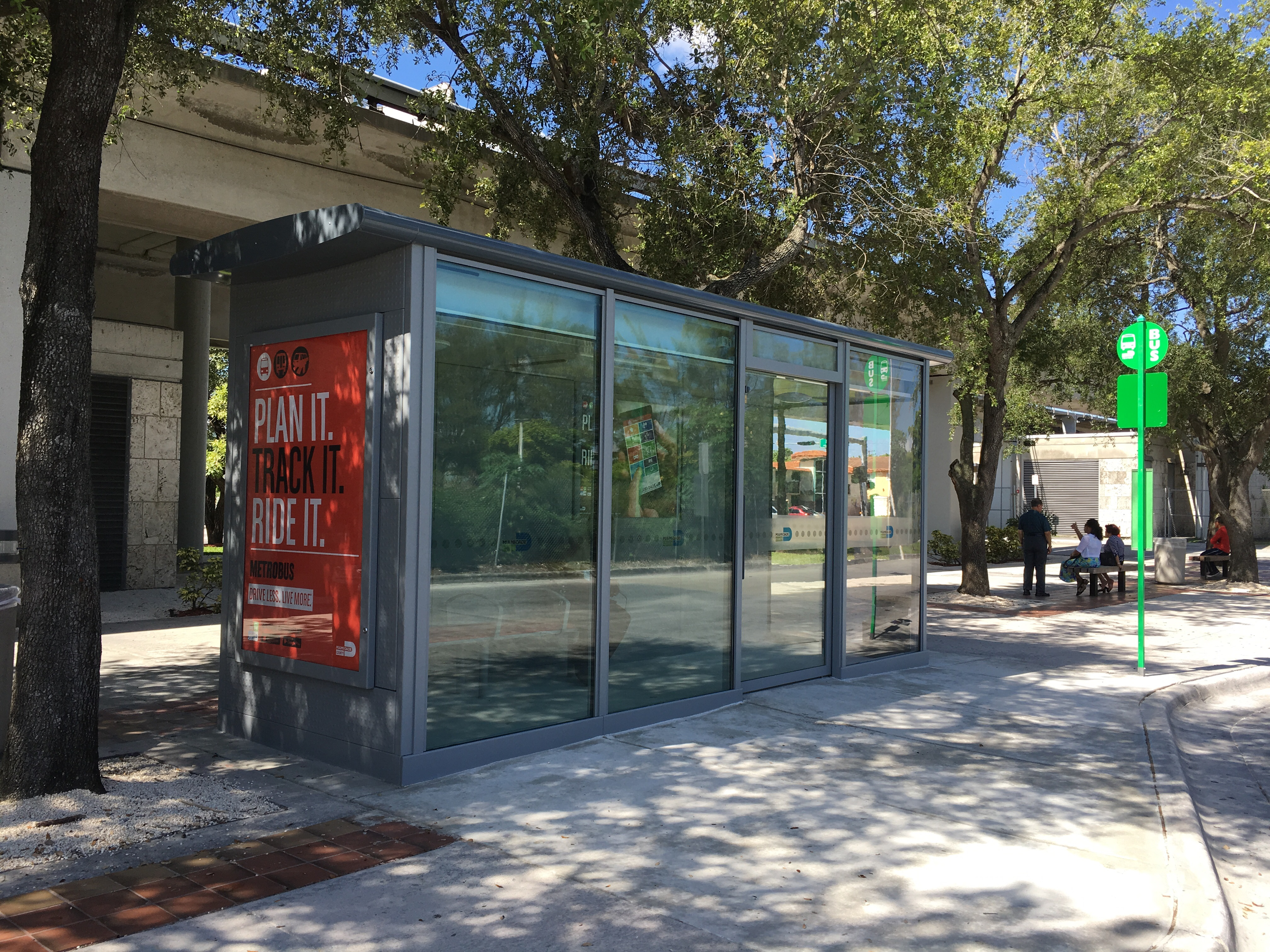
County's first air conditioned bus shelter at Hialeah station.

Bus ridership has reached as high as 293,000 daily, but is generally around a quarter million. It reached a high during the real estate bubble of the 2000s, then declined during the bad economy amid service cuts during the Great Recession, before rising again in the 2010s. From 2015 into 2016, bus ridership fell sharply, down to a low of 195,000 daily in June 2016, amid the lowest gas prices in over a decade, despite a locally strong economy and steady population gain. This during a time when much effort was going into enhancements, such as an air-conditioned bus shelter, mobile ticketing, and new rolling stock, including electric buses. Part of the problem is that buses, unlike other transit alternatives, are not exempt from the increasing traffic present. Nationally, bus ridership fell while rail ridership increased slightly in 2015.

== Routes ==
The system has 95 routes with 8,860 stations, some of which run 24 hours. The services are divided into categories of local, circulator, limited-stop (MAX), express, and Metro Express.

Route information effective as of April 27, 2026.

Route Name	Terminal 1	Terminal 2	via	notes
2	Downtown; Southwest 1st Avenue & 1st Street	Little River/El Portal; Northeast 84th Street & Northeast 2nd Avenue	Northwest 2nd Avenue	
3 Biscayne Local	Downtown; Downtown Metrobus Terminal	Aventura; Aventura Mall	Biscayne Boulevard	24-hour service
7	Downtown; Northeast 1st Avenue & 4th Street	Sweetwater; Dolphin Mall	Northwest 7th Street, Fontainebleau Boulevard	
8	Brickell; Brickell station	West End; Southwest 26th Street & 147th Avenue	Southwest 8th Street (Tamiami Trail), Southwest 26th Street/Coral Way	No weekend service
8	Brickell; Brickell station	University Park; FIU Maidique Bus Terminal	Southwest 7th/8th Streets (Tamiami Trail)	All weekend service
8	Brickell; Brickell station	Westchester; Southwest 82nd Avenue & Southwest 8th Street	Southwest 7th/8th Streets (Tamiami Trail)	Alternate rush hour trips
9	Downtown; Downtown Bus Terminal	Aventura; Aventura Mall	Northeast 2nd Avenue, Northeast 12th Avenue, Miami Gardens Drive	Trips alternate between each line; Route 9 trips before 6 AM run via NE 6th Avenue between 167th Street and Miami Gardens Drive
9A	Downtown; Downtown Bus Terminal	Aventura; Aventura Mall	Northeast 2nd Avenue, Northeast 6th Avenue, Biscayne Boulevard	Trips alternate between each line; Route 9 trips before 6 AM run via NE 6th Avenue between 167th Street and Miami Gardens Drive
11 Flagler Local	Downtown; Downtown Bus Terminal	University Park; FIU Maidique Bus Terminal	Southwest 1st Street (EB), Flagler Street	24-hour service
12	Gladeview; Northside station	Coconut Grove; Mercy Hospital	Northwest/Southwest 12th Avenue	Interlined with route 21 north of Northwest 20th Street
14	Downtown; Omni Terminal/Arsht Metromover station	Nautilus; Mt. Sinai Medical Center	MacArthur Causeway, Lincoln Road, Collins Avenue	
15	Downtown; Omni Terminal/Arsht Metromover station	City Center; Dade Boulevard & 23rd Street	Venetian Causeway, 17th Street	
16	Upper Eastside; Northeast 5th Avenue and 81st Street	North Miami Beach; The Mall at 163rd Street	Northeast 6th Avenue, Northeast 16th Avenue	No weekend service; Previously MetroLink NoMi
17	The Roads; Vizcaya station	North Miami Beach; The Mall at 163rd Street	Northwest 17th Avenue, Northwest 22nd Avenue	
20	City Center; Washington Avenue and 17th Street	Miami Intermodal Center	Alton Road, MacArthur Causeway, Northwest 20th Street	Interlined with route 32 between Omni Terminal and Northwest 36th Street; Interlined with route 101 between Omni Terminal and 17th Street
21	Downtown; Downtown Metrobus Terminal	Gladeview; Northside station	Northwest 12th Avenue	Interlined with route 12 north of Northwest 20th Street
22	Coconut Grove; Coconut Grove station	Westview; Miami-Dade College North	Southwest/Northwest 22nd Avenue	
24 Coral Way Limited	Brickell; Brickell station	University Park; FIU Maidique Bus Terminal	Coral Way	Makes limited stops east of Ponce De Leon Boulevard
25	Westview; Miami-Dade College North	North Miami; Northeast 12th Avenue & Northeast 137th Street	Northwest 125th Street	No weekend service; Previously MetroLink NoMi West
26	Brickell; Brickell station	Key Biscayne; Crandon Boulevard and Arthur Lamb Jr. Road (Bill Baggs Cape Florida State Park)	Rickenbacker Causeway/Crandon Boulevard	
27	Miami Gardens; Northwest 207th Street & 27th Avenue	Coconut Grove; Coconut Grove station	Southwest/Northwest 27th Avenue	Trips alternate between each branch; 27A has 24-hour service (Overnight trips do not enter Brownsville or Dr. Martin Luther King Jr. stations)
27A	Miami Gardens; Northwest 207th Street & 27th Avenue	Coconut Grove; Coconut Grove station	Southwest/Northwest 27th Avenue, Northwest 37th Avenue	Trips alternate between each branch; 27A has 24-hour service (Overnight trips do not enter Brownsville or Dr. Martin Luther King Jr. stations)
32	Downtown; Omni Terminal/Arsht Metromover station	Miami Gardens; Northwest 47th Avenue & 199th Street	Northwest 20th Street, Northwest 32nd Avenue, Northwest 47th Avenue	Interlined with route 20 south of Northwest 36th Street
35	Cutler Bay; Southwest 102nd Avenue & 211th Street (Southland Mall)	Southwest 112th Avenue, Moody Drive/Southwest 268th Street, Campbell Drive/Southwest 312th Street		
36	Doral; Northwest 53rd Street & 87th Avenue	City Center; Lincoln Road & Washington Avenue	Northwest 36th Street, Julia Tuttle Causeway, Collins Avenue	Trips alternate between each branch
36A	Miami Intermodal Center	City Center; Lincoln Road & Washington Avenue	Northwest 36th Street, Julia Tuttle Causeway, Collins Avenue	Trips alternate between each branch
37	Miami Intermodal Center	Coral Way; Douglas Road station	Northwest/Southwest 37th Avenue	Trips alternate between each branch
37	Country Club/Carol City; Red Road Transit Hub	South Miami; South Miami station	Palm Avenue, Northwest/Southwest 37th Avenue, Southwest 72nd Street (Sunset Drive)	Trips alternate between each branch
40	Coral Way; Douglas Road station	Kendall West; Southwest 152nd Avenue and 42nd Street	Bird Road (Southwest 40th/42nd Streets)	
42	Coral Way; Douglas Road station	Opa-locka; Opa-locka station	Northwest/Southwest 42nd Avenue (Le Jeune Road)	No weekend service; Previously MetroLink LeJeune
52	Kendall; Coral Reef Drive station (Southwest 152nd Street Transitway station)	Cutler Bay; Community Health of South Florida-Doris Ison Health Center	Southwest 112th Avenue	
52	South Miami Heights/Cutler Bay; Caribbean Boulevard station (Southwest 200th Street Transitway station)	Cutler Bay; Community Health of South Florida-Doris Ison Health Center		Alternate trips
54	Upper Eastside; Northeast 61st Street and 4th Court	Palm Springs North; Northwest 186th Street and 87th Avenue	Northwest 54th Street, Northwest 82nd Avenue	No weekend service
54	Upper Eastside; Northeast 61st Street and 4th Court	Hialeah Gardens; Northwest 87th Court and 114th Street	Northwest 54th Street	Alternate weekday and all weekend trips
56	Riviera; University station	Kendall West; Southwest 56th Street and 152nd Avenue	Miller Road (Southwest 56th Street)	No Sunday service
57	Riviera; University station	Miami Intermodal Center	Southwest 42nd Avenue (Le Jeune Road)	No weekend service; Previously northern half of 56
62	Upper Eastside; Northeast 61st Street and Biscayne Boulevard	Hialeah; West 3rd Street and Palm Avenue	Northwest 62nd Street	
62	Upper Eastside; Northeast 61st Street and Biscayne Boulevard	Gladeview; Dr. Martin Luther King Jr. Plaza station	Northwest 62nd Street	Alternate trips
70	Cutler Bay; Southwest 102nd Avenue & 211th Street (Southland Mall)	Florida City; Southwest 344th Street Park & Ride	Southwest 112th Avenue, Southwest 248th Street, Dixie Highway	
72 Sunset Local	South Miami; South Miami station	The Hammocks; West Kendall Transit Terminal	Southwest 72nd Street (Sunset Drive)	
73	Hialeah; Okeechobee station	Kendall; Dadeland North station	Northwest 72nd Avenue (Miami Dairy Road), Southwest 67th Avenue (Ludlam Road)	
73	Hialeah; Okeechobee station	Kendall; Coral Reef Drive station (Southwest 152nd Street Transitway station)	Northwest 72nd Avenue (Miami Dairy Road), Southwest 67th Avenue (Ludlam Road), Southwest 57th Avenue (Red Road)	Alternate rush hour trips
75	Sunny Isles Beach; Sunny Isles Beach Government Center	Miami Lakes; Northwest 57th Avenue and 163rd Street (Miami Lakes Educational Center)	Northeast 163rd Street, Northeast 167th Street, Northwest 175th Street	Trips alternate between 75 and 75A; No 75 weekend service west of Red Road Transit Hub
75	Sunny Isles Beach; Sunny Isles Beach Government Center	Country Club/Carol City; Red Road Transit Hub	Northeast 163rd Street, Northeast 167th Street, Northwest 175th Street	Trips alternate between 75 and 75A; No 75 weekend service west of Red Road Transit Hub
75A	North Miami; FIU Biscayne Bay Campus	Golden Glades; Golden Glades Park and Ride	Northeast 163rd Street, Northeast 167th Street	Trips alternate between 75 and 75A; No 75 weekend service west of Red Road Transit Hub
77	Downtown; Downtown Bus Terminal	Norland; Northwest 7th Avenue & 183rd Street	Northwest 7th Avenue	Trips alternate between clockwise and counterclockwise north of 183rd Street; 24-hour service counterclockwise
79 79th Street Local	City Center; Lincoln Road & Washington Avenue	Hialeah; Hialeah station	Collins Avenue, Indian Creek Drive, Northeast/Northwest 79th Street	
79 79th Street Local	City Center; Lincoln Road & Washington Avenue	Gladeview; Northside station	Collins Avenue, Indian Creek Drive, Northeast/Northwest 79th Street	Overnight service
87	Medley; Palmetto station	Kendall; Dadeland North station	Northwest/Southwest 87th Avenue	
88 Kendall Local	Kendall; Dadeland North station	The Hammocks; West Kendall Transit Terminal	Southwest 88th Street (Kendall Drive)	
95 Golden Glades Express	Downtown; Northwest 8th Street and 1st Court	Golden Glades; Golden Glades Park and Ride	Interstate 95	Select 95 and 95A trips run north of Golden Glades Park and Ride; No reverse-peak service on 95B; No reverse-peak service north of Golden Glades Park and Ride; No off-peak service
95 Golden Glades Express	Downtown; Northwest 8th Street and 1st Court	Country Club; Miami Gardens Drive and Northwest 73rd Avenue Park and Ride	Interstate 95, Northwest 183rd Street (Miami Gardens Drive)	Select 95 and 95A trips run north of Golden Glades Park and Ride; No reverse-peak service on 95B; No reverse-peak service north of Golden Glades Park and Ride; No off-peak service
95A Golden Glades Express	Allapattah; UHealth-Jackson station (AM rush hours); Santa Clara station (PM rush hours)	Golden Glades; Golden Glades Park and Ride	Interstate 95	Select 95 and 95A trips run north of Golden Glades Park and Ride; No reverse-peak service on 95B; No reverse-peak service north of Golden Glades Park and Ride; No off-peak service
95A Golden Glades Express	Allapattah; UHealth-Jackson station (AM rush hours); Santa Clara station (PM rush hours)	Aventura; Aventura Mall	Interstate 95, Miami Gardens Drive	Select 95 and 95A trips run north of Golden Glades Park and Ride; No reverse-peak service on 95B; No reverse-peak service north of Golden Glades Park and Ride; No off-peak service
95B Golden Glades Express	Doral; Northwest 87th Avenue and 36th Street	Golden Glades; Golden Glades Park and Ride	Northwest 36th Street, Airport Expressway, Interstate 95	Select 95 and 95A trips run north of Golden Glades Park and Ride; No reverse-peak service on 95B; No reverse-peak service north of Golden Glades Park and Ride; No off-peak service
97	West Perrine; Southwest 168th Street and Dixie Highway (Southwest 168th Street Transitway Station)	South Miami Heights; Quail Roost Drive and Southwest 115th Avenue	Southwest 97th Avenue, Caribbean Boulevard	
100	Downtown; Northwest 1st Street & 1st Avenue	Aventura; Aventura Mall	MacArthur Causeway, Indian Creek Drive, Harding Avenue, Collins Avenue	24-hour service
101	Downtown; Northwest 1st Street & 1st Avenue	Nautilus; Mt. Sinai Medical Center	MacArthur Causeway, Alton Road	No weekend service; Interlined with route 20 between Omni Terminal and 17th Street; Previously MetroLink Alton
103	Upper Eastside; Northeast 5th Avenue and 81st Street	Hialeah Gardens; Northwest 87th Avenue and 103rd Street	Northwest 103rd Street (East/West 49th Street)	
104 Killian Local	Kendall; Dadeland North station	The Hammocks; West Kendall Transit Terminal	Southwest 88th Street (Kendall Drive), Southwest 104th Street (Killian Parkway)	Trips alternate between each line
104A Killian Local	Kendall; Dadeland North station	The Hammocks; West Kendall Transit Terminal	Southwest 88th Street (Kendall Drive), Southwest 104th Street (Killian Parkway)	Trips alternate between each line
107	Sweetwater; Dolphin Mall	Cutler Bay; South Dade Government Center	Southwest 107th Avenue, Southwest 112th Avenue, Southwest 117th Avenue	
125	Surfside; Harding Avenue and 94th Street	Westview; Miami-Dade College North	Northeast 123rd/125th Streets, Northwest 119th Street	
132 Tri-Rail Doral Shuttle	Hialeah; Hialeah Market station	Doral; Northwest 53rd Street and 79th Avenue	Northwest 36th Street	Trips alternate between clockwise and counterclockwise west of 79th Avenue; No off-peak service
135	North Miami; FIU Biscayne Bay Campus	Opa-locka; Opa-locka station	Northeast/Northwest 135th Street, Opa-locka Boulevard (WB)	
136	Coral Way; Douglas Road station	Kendall; Southwest 89th Place and 136th Street	Southwest 42nd Avenue (Le Jeune Road), Old Cutler Road, Southwest 136th Street (Howard Drive)	No reverse-peak or off-peak service
137 West Dade Connection	Sweetwater; Dolphin Mall	Cutler Bay; South Dade Government Center	Southwest 137th Avenue (Lindgren Road)	
150 Miami Beach Airport Express	South of Fifth; Washington Avenue and South Pointe Drive	Miami Intermodal Center	Washington Avenue, Collins Avenue, Julia Tuttle Causeway, Airport Expressway	Makes limited stops east of Alton Road
152	Country Walk; Southwest 152nd Avenue and 152nd Street	Kendall; Coral Reef Drive station (Southwest 152nd Street Transitway station)	Southwest 152nd Street (Coral Reef Drive)	Weekend service serves Zoo Miami
183	Hialeah; Okeechobee station	Aventura; Aventura Mall	West 12th Avenue/Northwest 67th Avenue (Ludlam Road), Northwest 183rd Street (Miami Gardens Drive)	
199	Country Club/Carol City; Red Road Transit Hub	Aventura; Aventura Mall	Northwest 57th Avenue (Red Road), Northwest 199th Street (Honey Hill Drive), Northwest 215th Street (County Line Road), Northeast 203rd Street (Ives Dairy Road)	
203 Biscayne MAX	Downtown; Downtown Metrobus Terminal	Aventura; Aventura Mall	Biscayne Boulevard	No off-peak service; Makes limited stops between 19th Street and 163rd Street
204 Killian MAX	Kendall; Dadeland North station	The Hammocks; West Kendall Transit Terminal	Snapper Creek Expressway, Don Shula Expressway, Southwest 104th Street (Killian Parkway)	No off-peak service; Peak direction trips stop in Hammocks Town Center and operate via Kendall Drive in The Hammocks, reverse peak trips do not stop in Hammocks Town Center and operate via Southwest 96th Street in The Hammocks; Makes limited stops east of Hammocks Town Center
207 Little Havana Connection	Brickell; Brickell station		Southwest 7th Street (Tamiami Trail), Southwest 1st Street	Clockwise circulator loop
208 Little Havana Connection	Brickell; Brickell station		Flagler Street, Southwest 8th Street (Tamiami Trail/Calle Ocho)	Counterclockwise circulator loop
211 Flagler MAX	Downtown; Downtown Bus Terminal	Sweetwater; Southwest 108th Avenue and Flagler Street	Southwest 1st Street (EB), Flagler Street	No off-peak service; Makes limited stops
272 Sunset MAX	Kendall; Dadeland North station	The Hammocks; West Kendall Transit Terminal	Snapper Creek Expressway, Southwest 72nd Street (Sunset Drive), Southwest 162nd Avenue	No off-peak service; Makes limited stops
279 79th Street MAX	Gladeview; Northside station	Miami Beach; Harding Avenue and 72nd Street	Northeast/Northwest 79th Street	No off-peak service; Makes limited stops
287 Saga Bay MAX	West Perrine; Richmond Drive station (Southwest 168th Street Transitway station)	Cutler Bay; Community Health of South Florida-Doris Ison Health Center	Southwest 87th Avenue	No off-peak service; Makes limited stops
288 Kendall MAX	Kendall; Dadeland North station	The Hammocks; West Kendall Transit Terminal	Snapper Creek Expressway, Southwest 88th Street (Kendall Drive)	Peak direction trips operate via 80th Street in the Hammocks; No off-peak service; Makes limited stops
301 Dade/Monroe Express	Florida City; Southwest 344th Street Park & Ride	Marathon; Mile Marker 50 (Marathon)	Dixie Highway/Overseas Highway	Select trips short turn at Islamorada or Tavernier
302 Card Sound Express	Florida City; West Palm Drive and 5th Avenue	North Key Largo; Ocean Reef Club Village	Card Sound Road, County Road 905	No service outside of 5:30-7:55 AM and 2:35 PM–5:00 PM everyday
338 Weekend Express	Miami Intermodal Center	Sweetwater; Dolphin Mall	Dolphin Expressway	No weekday service
344	Homestead; Miami-Dade College Homestead	Southwest Florida City; Southwest 193rd Avenue and 378th Street	Southwest 177th Avenue (Krome Avenue), Southwest 344th Street (East/West Palm Drive)	No Sunday service
400 South Owl	Downtown; Southwest 1st Street& 1st Court	Kendall West; Dadeland South station	Dixie Highway	No daytime service
401 North Owl	Downtown; Downtown Bus Terminal	North Miami Beach; The Mall at 163rd Street	Northwest 12th Avenue, Northwest 22nd Avenue	No daytime service
500 Cutler Bay Circulator	Cutler Bay; Old Cutler Road and Old Cutler Town Center		Dixie Highway, Southwest 87th Avenue	No morning or evening service; Clockwise circulator loop
510 Skylake Circulator	North Miami Beach; The Mall at 163rd Street	Ojus; Northeast 185th Street and 18th Avenue	Northeast 19th Avenue	Community circulator
601 Metro Express	Kendall West; Dadeland South station	Florida City; Southwest 344th Street Park & Ride	South Dade Transitway	Only stops at BRT stations along Transitway
602 Transitway Local	Kendall West; Dadeland South station	Florida City; Southwest 344th Street Park & Ride	South Dade Transitway	24-hour service; Makes all stops along Transitway
836 Express	Downtown; Downtown Bus Terminal	North Tamiami; Dolphin Station Park and Ride	Dolphin Expressway	No weekend service
837 Express	Downtown; Downtown Bus Terminal	West End; Tamiami Station Park and Ride	Dolphin Expressway	No off-peak service

== Fleet ==
As of 2026, Miami-Dade Transit operates over 800 buses, which consist of the following:

- Gillig BRT 29’
- Gillig BRT 40’
- Gillig BRT CNG 40’
- Gillig BRT HEV 40’
- New Flyer XDE60
- New Flyer XE60
- New Flyer XN40
- NABI 40-LFW
- NABI 40-LFW Gen III
- NABI 60-BRT HEV
- Proterra ZX5 40’

== South Dade TransitWay ==
The South Dade TransitWay (originally named the South Miami-Dade Busway) is a bus rapid transit (BRT) corridor, or busway, serving southern Miami-Dade County, Florida, running approximately 20 miles (32 km) between Dadeland South Metrorail station and Southwest 344th Street in Florida City, parallel to U.S. Route 1 (South Dixie Highway) along a former Florida East Coast Railway right-of-way.

Service began on February 3, 1997, on an 8.3-mile (13.4 km) segment between the Dadeland South station of Metrorail and Southplace Mall (then known as Cutler Ridge Mall). The corridor was extended 5 miles (8 km) to Southwest 264th Street on April 24, 2005, followed by a final 6.5-mile (10.5 km) extension to Southwest 344th Street in Florida City on December 16, 2007. Between 2021 and 2025, the corridor was rebuilt with dedicated bus rapid transit stations and supporting infrastructure, supplementing the original busway stops.

== Fares ==
Standard Metrobus fares are $2.25 and include transfers to Metrorail. Daily, weekly, and monthly passes are also available using an Easy Card or the Miami-Dade Transit app. Miami-Dade Transit introduced an open payment system to Metrorail on August 21, 2019, and Metrobus on December 23, 2019, allowing riders to pay with contactless bank cards and mobile payment (including Apple Pay, Google Pay, Samsung Pay, and Fitbit Pay). As of the 2019 implementation of tap to pay, the Discover Card, via tap to pay, is not accepted systemwide.

== Ridership ==
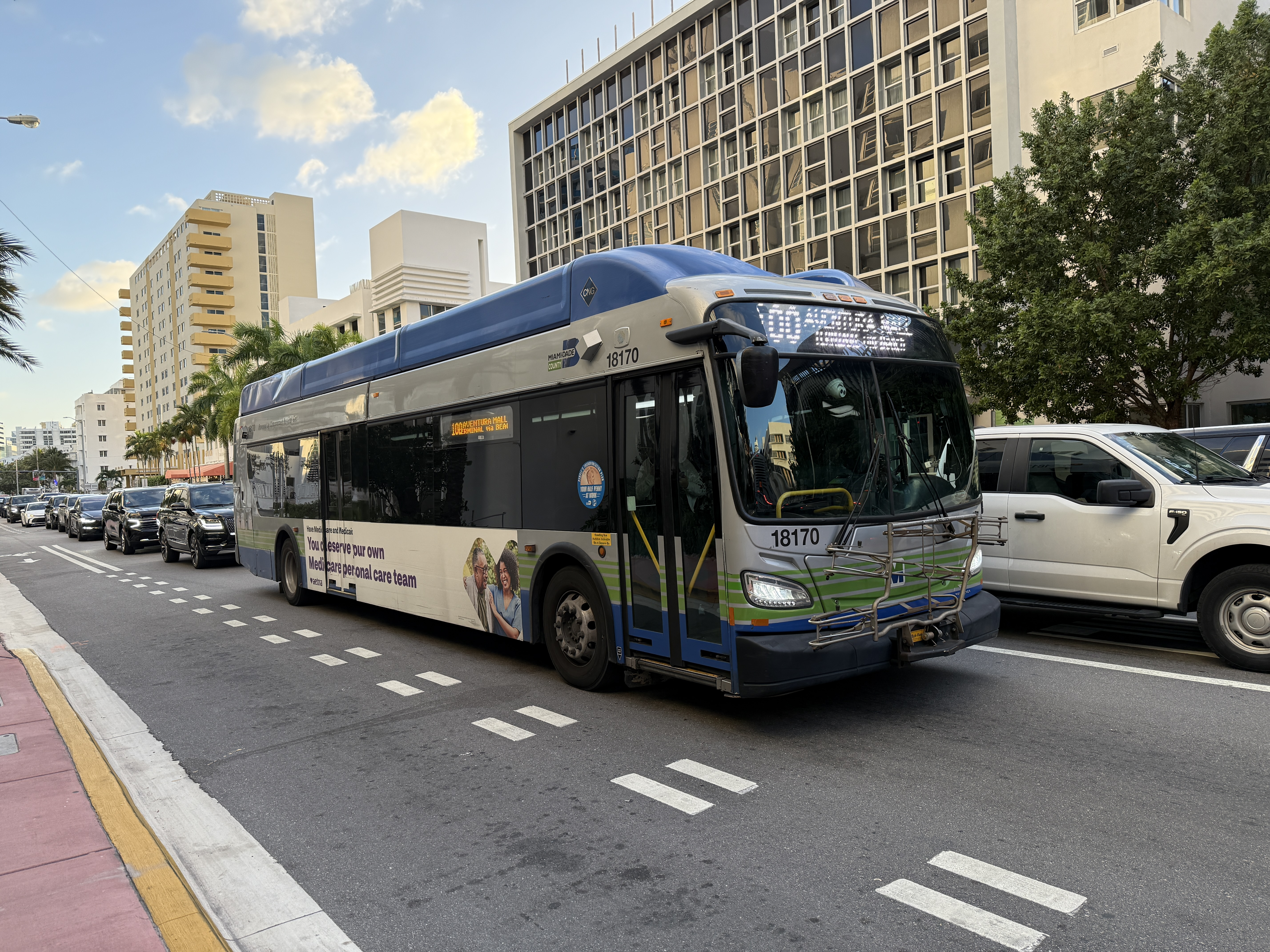
Route 100 bus in Miami Beach

Ridership detail by average daily ridership on weekdays by month, with yearly average and highest ridership month in bold. Note the generally lower ridership during the summer months and December, month of the long Christmas and holiday season. Ridership has been falling since 2014 amid widespread rider complaints, an aging fleet, and sharply declining gas prices beginning in late 2014. Starting in 2016, this was also affecting Metrorail ridership. By 2016, 70% of the bus fleet was considered beyond its expected useful life, as the county was in the process of buying 30 electric buses with an option for 20 more. This is well under 10% of a fleet of nearly 1,000 buses. Other upgrades included a new mobile ticketing and contactless payment system, as well as upgrades to bus stops, including covering shelter-less bus stops and air conditioning at select locations. By mid 2016, average daily ridership was over 100,000 below a pre-recession peak in November 2007, and May, June, July, and August 2016 were the lowest ridership months in over a decade. Some of the ridership loss may be accounted for by overlap and growth of the free Miami Trolley and other pseudo-bus systems. Very poor numbers in October 2016 across the entire system were partially blamed on one day of closures for Hurricane Matthew, which passed close to South Florida. Similarly, September 2017, the month of Hurricane Irma, saw even lower ridership. 2016 was the lowest ridership year since online records began in 1998. Summer 2017 saw weekday ridership decline another 10% on top of sustained decline. January 2018's ridership of 162,300 is the lowest since at least the 90s with the exception of the month Hurricane Irma hit.

#	Month	1999	2000	2001	2002	2003	2004	2005	2006	2007	2008	2009	2010	2011	2012	2013	2014	2015	2016	2017
1	January	212,100	216,700	215,700	208,150	205,800	231,500	242,100	265,400	260,200	258,600	244,500	222,300	238,500	248,900	248,200	241,900	240,400	209,600	192,900
2	February	218,350	220,000	227,400	216,300	219,200	240,800	251,000	267,300	266,600	266,400	254,400	230,000	253,100	257,500	264,500	258,800	238,000	217,600	203,600
3	March	215,000	220,350	221,800	209,800	217,600	238,500	246,700	270,500	270,900	266,900	252,000	229,700	250,900	260,000	258,100	250,800	249,100	210,200	196,300
4	April	205,800	204,400	210,250	207,350	208,100	227,700	251,400	260,000	257,000	265,500	256,600	230,400	249,200	255,800	255,600	250,000	232,000	214,500	193,900
5	May	208,900	214,000	210,450	206,300	208,900	237,600	242,600	255,600	262,900	273,500	239,800	232,900	248,000	245,200	244,700	242,300	227,800	207,100	189,200
6	June	195,300	206,200	202,800	191,550	200,700	223,840	225,900	248,000	248,100	258,600	219,600	221,300	237,000	235,600	235,200	226,100	212,600	195,000	174,300
7	July	203,900	209,800	208,950	196,500	205,000	229,400	212,500	240,200	243,500	256,600	211,400	213,700	231,100	237,900	231,600	226,400	209,900	191,900	175,100
8	August	200,100	206,500	207,800	199,350	198,800	226,900	241,300	245,000	257,000	250,500	227,300	220,600	232,500	237,900	243,400	235,600	216,500	189,500	175,500
9	September	211,600	217,850	208,950	209,100	219,500	226,300	241,131	270,000	280,200	269,400	234,500	233,800	254,600	257,100	259,000	248,500	223,800	202,300	147,200*
10	October	210,350	208,000	210,300	212,800	226,500	242,700	241,419	270,000	267,500	257,700	224,600	243,700	252,000	257,600	261,400	246,900	226,000	187,800	177,900
11	November	221,250	221,800	209,000	210,500	225,000	244,200	267,600	262,400	**302,000**	243,900	226,000	239,600	256,600	258,000	252,800	240,800	220,500	203,200	177,300
12	December	206,600	209,400	205,700	198,500	216,900	229,000	255,100	258,100	257,700	240,600	215,600	216,600	240,800	246,200	242,300	234,500	211,400	195,700	172,200
**13**	**Year Average**	**209,100**	**212,900**	**211,600**	**205,500**	**212,700**	**233,200**	**243.200**	**259,400**	**264,500**	**259,000**	**233,900**	**227,900**	**245,400**	**249,800**	**249,700**	**241,900**	**225,700**	**202,000**	**181,300**

== See also ==
- List of Metrobus routes (Miami-Dade County)
- Transportation in South Florida
