= Palmetto station =

Miami-Dade Transit metro station

● Palmetto
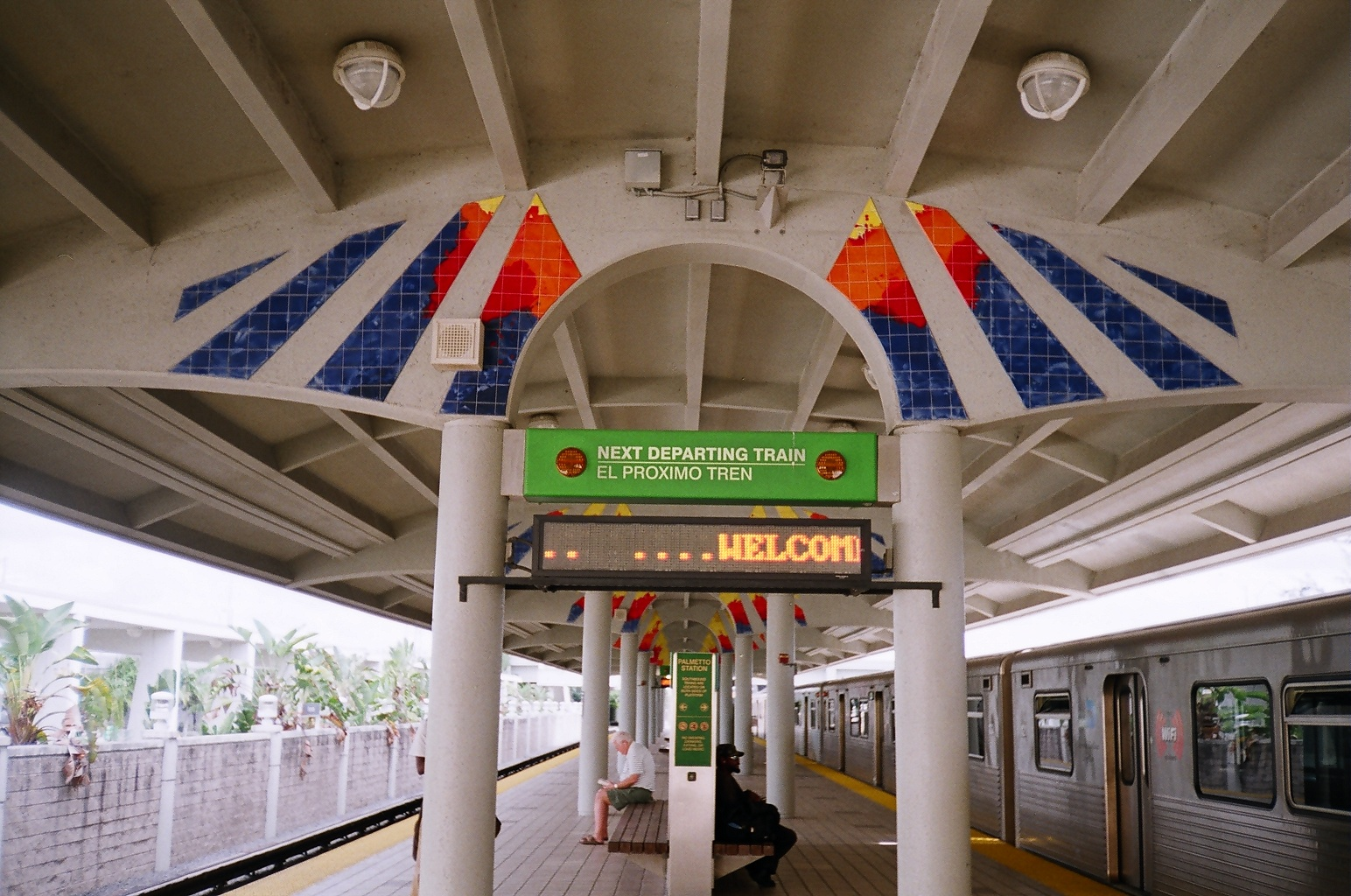
- Platform and waiting train at the station

General information
- Location: 7701 NW 79th Avenue; Miami, Florida
- Coordinates: 25°50′36″N 80°19′27″W
- Owner: Miami-Dade County
- Platforms: 1 island platform
- Tracks: 2
- Connections: Metrobus: 87; Doral Trolley: 2, 3

Construction
- Parking: 720 spaces
- Accessible: Yes

Other information
- Station code: PAL

History
- Opened: May 30, 2003

Passengers
- 2011: 312,000 0%

Services
| Preceding station | Miami-Dade Transit | Following station |
|---|---|---|
| Okeechobee toward Dadeland South | Green Line | Terminus |
Location

Palmetto station is a rapid transit station in unincorporated Miami-Dade County, Florida, United States, near the town of Medley. It is the current northern terminus of the Metrorail system. This station is located near the intersection of Northwest 77th Street and 79 Avenue, opening to service May 30, 2003. It is adjacent to the Palmetto Expressway (SR 826) (its namesake), providing convenience to west Miami-Dade and Broward commuters traveling into Downtown Miami. The station is in a low-density warehouse area and has low ridership. In 2023 a 900-unit housing project was proposed for the site.

== Station layout ==
The station has two tracks and an island platform, with parking north of the station structure.

== Places of interest ==
- Miami-Dade Animal Services Shelter/Adoption Center
- Town of Medley
- City of Doral
- Miami-Dade Warehouse District
