= Transportation in South Florida =

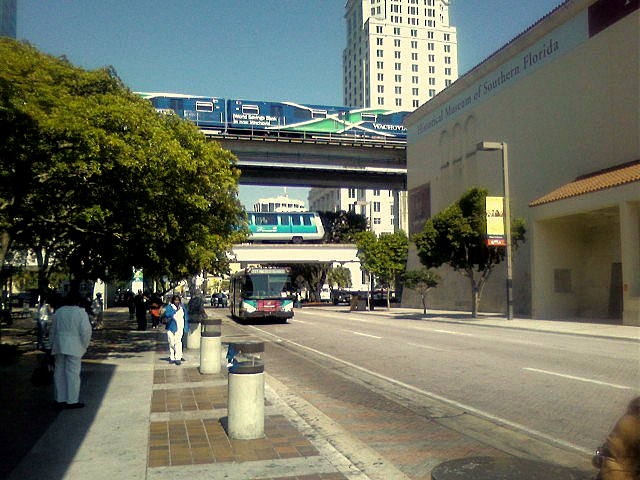
The three main Miami-Dade Transit-operated systems, Metrobus, Metromover, and Metrorail, at Government Center station in Downtown Miami.

The Miami metropolitan area (Note: "Greater Miami" or "the Miami area" may refer to Miami-Dade County, the entire South Florida metropolitan area, or any other contiguous area centered by the city of Miami but extending beyond technical city limits. Miami was added to Dade County in 1997 due to the international name recognition of Miami. Miami has a land area of about 35 square miles (91 km^{2}). Miami-Fort Lauderdale-Pompano Beach covers all three counties, though Miami-Fort Lauderdale is commonly considered a separate metro area from West Palm Beach. Miami-Fort Lauderdale is also considered to be one radio and television market, separate from West Palm Beach. Miami-Miami Beach-Kendall is another smaller designation.) composed of the three counties of Miami-Dade, Broward, and Palm Beach, also known collectively as South Florida, is home to a wide variety of public and private transportation systems.

These include heavy rail mass transit (Metrorail), commuter rail (Tri-Rail), automated guideway transit (Metromover), highways, two major airports (Miami International Airport (MIA) and Fort Lauderdale–Hollywood International Airport (FLL)) and seaports (Port of Miami and Port Everglades), as well as three county-wide bus networks (Miami-Dade Metrobus, Broward County Transit (BCT), and Palm Tran), which cover the entire urbanized area of South Florida. Census and ridership data show that Miami has the highest public transportation usage of any city in Florida, as about 17% of Miamians use public transportation on a regular basis, compared to about 4% of commuters in the South Florida metropolitan area.

The majority of public transportation in Miami is operated by Miami-Dade Transit (MDT), which is currently the largest transit system in Florida and was the 14th largest transit system in the United States in 2011.

South Florida is one of the most densely populated urbanized areas in the United States overall, (Note: In terms of the population of the tri-county urbanized region divided by the urbanized area, the density is relatively high. However, it is sprawled out in terms of lack of clear urban corridors and transit-oriented planning,) being bound by the Atlantic Ocean to the east and the South Florida Water Management District and the Everglades to the west, with a fairly strict Urban Development Boundary (UDB). As of the 2010 U.S. census, South Florida is both the eighth-most populous and eighth most densely populated metropolitan area in the United States.

Now, with a population of over five and a half million people living in an urbanized area of only 1,116.1 sq mi (2,891 km^{2}), it has an average population density of over 5,000 residents per square mile. According to the population as of the 2010 U.S. census, the 35.68 sq mi (92 km^{2}) Miami city proper has an average population density of about 12,139 residents per square mile, with Downtown area, particularly Brickell, being the fastest growing and most dense neighborhoods.

A major problem for urban planning and effective public transit in Miami-Dade and South Florida is the fact that in terms of planning, it is one of the most sprawled out and automobile dependent metropolitan areas in the United States, with a lot of lowly contrasted medium density development spread throughout the area. A low percentage of the area's office space, only 13 percent, is located in the Central Business District (CBD) of Miami. Subsequently, transit access between people and jobs in the city and region remains limited.

== Overview ==
Transport in South Florida is largely dominated by roads, highways, and toll roads. While the region originally burgeoned because of Henry Flagler's railroad, much of it was built from the 1920s Florida land boom onward, through eras that saw the rise of the automobile, the fall of streetcars, then the general fall of public transport during the 1950s and 1960s. The 24-mile (39 km) Metrorail, located solely in Miami-Dade County and centered in Miami, is Florida's only heavy rail mass transit system, and has lower ridership compared to other systems in the United States. It was planned after public outcry against an expensive highway expansion plan during the 1970s energy crisis during a time other regions such as the San Francisco Bay Area were also building heavy rail under the Carter Administration. Despite having the system mostly built, it faced criticism for not completing the 50-mile (80 km) system. Tri-Rail, which runs west of South Florida's major downtowns on a former CSX line, is a commuter rail system introduced to provide an alternative to the congestion on Interstate 95. There is a proposal to bring a commuter rail line to Henry Flagler's Florida East Coast Railway line that passes directly through the major urban areas, which will share the track with the Brightline service on the corridor.

In South Florida, there are two Florida Department of Transportation districts and three Metropolitan Planning Organizations. There are county-wide bus systems, trolley networks in smaller cities and two rail systems, one serving Miami-Dade County exclusively, the other stretching across Miami-Dade, Broward, and Palm Beach counties.

Florida has no state-level income tax, but has more toll road mileage than any other state. South Florida is home to a large number of tolled or partially tolled roads with express lanes, the latter of which can have a variable rate that can rise to over US$1 per mile during high congestion. Highway expansion through widening projects, the addition of express lanes, and the rebuilding of interchanges has persisted into the 2010s, though traffic congestion is as bad as ever, ranking among the highest in United States metropolitan areas.

With a population nearing six million, Miami-Dade Transit, Broward County Transit, and Palm Tran combined carry less than half a million passengers per day, a number that works out to less than 5% of the population using transit regularly once round trips are figured. In Greater Downtown Miami, which has seen more than 100% population growth since 2000, the Metromover system carries almost half the daily riders of the Metrorail system with only about 4 miles (6.4 km) of track. Although it directly connects to the Metrorail system at two stations, nearly 80% of the ridership is through direct boardings. This mode alone would suggest at least 15% of the downtown-area population uses transit.

Historically, Metromover ridership remained fairly steady from 1995 (after outer loop extensions) to 2002, when the 25 cent fare was lifted, making the system entirely free to use. After this, ridership spiked by more than 60% within two years, but it was not until 2013 that ridership doubled from 2002. In a region and state not overly inclined to public transport, this system is considered successful and a vital part of downtown life.

The elimination of the fare was just a small part of a sales tax increase that was approved by two-thirds of Miami-Dade voters under the promise that major rail-based transit extensions would take place. Funds were misused and it was later falsely claimed that the half-cent increase would not be enough for the expansion promised, despite the fact that the Citizens' Independent Transportation Trust concluded that the Metrorail extension along 9 rail corridors is financially viable. further souring public opinion of local transit and government.

Miami International Airport (MIA) is one of the busiest airports in the United States in terms of total passenger traffic and cargo traffic, but especially when it comes to international traffic. It is considered to be the largest economic engine in Miami-Dade County, and has a large employee base. It was connected to the Metrorail system in 2012, the AirportLink that created the Orange Line, which most significantly led to higher service frequency in the southern portion of the existing Green Line. The connection is made at the Miami Airport station through the MIA Mover people mover, and the station receives about 1,600 passengers a day. With headways cut in half, ridership rose much more on double-lined portion of the system from Earlington Heights to Dadeland South stations than the Airport Station itself. MIA has seen record growth in the 2010s, with the addition of many major international flights and carriers, though many are connecting flights, similar to Hartsfield Jackson, with Miami being a layover not a final destination.

As the population of South Florida fluctuates similar to the rest of the state, traffic, transit ridership, and flight volumes (FTL) are all generally greater in the winter season.

== Road transportation ==
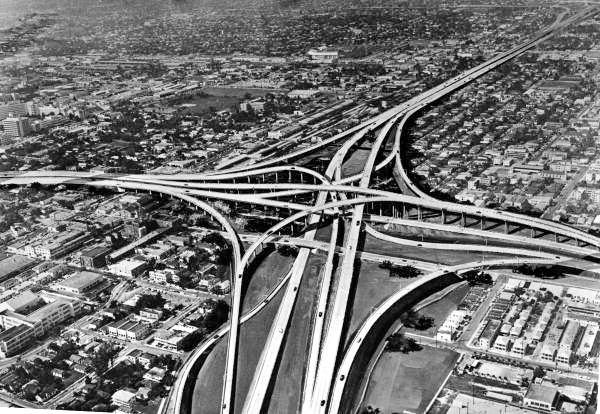
A 1960s aerial view of the Midtown Interchange, where I-95 meets I-395 and the Dolphin Expressway

Miami-Dade County contains many grade separated freeways built to Interstate Highway standards. The main north–south thoroughfare for the entire tri-county area is Interstate 95. I-95 and the Palmetto Expressway, a highly congested elevated freeway that serves the farther inland part of the county, are the two busiest roads in South Florida, with traffic in places exceeding 250,000 vehicles per day. Interstate 95 terminates into U.S. Route 1 just south of downtown Miami, in the Brickell neighborhood.

I-95 has three east–west spurs in the Miami area; from south to north, they are I-395 and I-195 in Miami-Dade County, as well as Interstate 595 in Broward County. I-395 is a short highway that runs east from I-95 and terminates on the MacArthur Causeway, en route to South Beach, Miami Beach; west of I-95, the same alignment is known as the Dolphin Expressway, which continues west all the way to the edge of the urban boundary at NW 137 Avenue just past Florida's Turnpike, while Interstate 395 crosses the MacArthur Causeway, becoming route A1A, and terminates into 5th Street in South Beach, Miami Beach. A few miles north, another east–west highway alignment exists, known as State Road 112 on the west side and as Interstate 195 east of I-95; State Route 112 terminates at the northeast corner of the airport and is also known as the Airport Expressway, while Interstate 195 goes east over the Julia Tuttle Causeway to Miami Beach.

In Broward County, north of Miami, east–west Interstate 595 connects I-95 to Fort Lauderdale to the east, and to the west it is known as Alligator Alley after it meets the Sawgrass Expressway and terminates into Interstate 75, which crosses the entire state of Florida before turning north.

Many highways and roads intersect at the complex Golden Glades Interchange near North Miami Beach in Miami-Dade County.

The Dolphin, Airport, Don Shula, and Snapper Creek expressways, as well as the Gratigny Parkway all have tolls and are managed by the Greater Miami Expressway Agency (GMX). The Sawgrass Expressway was once managed by the Broward County Expressway Authority, but was sold to Florida's Turnpike Enterprise in 1990.

The rest of the highways and the majority of major roads in Miami-Dade County and the state are operated by the Florida Department of Transportation (FDOT). The Rickenbacker Causeway is a tolled and divided highway managed by Miami-Dade County.

Termini of the controlled-access, tolled Florida State Roads (and their common names), as well as the southern extension of Florida's Turnpike, all serving Miami-Dade:

- SR 112 (Airport Expressway): Interstate 95 to MIA
- Homestead Extension of Florida's Turnpike (SR 821): Florida's Turnpike mainline (SR 91)/Miami Gardens to U.S. Route 1/Florida City
- SR 826 (Palmetto Expressway): Golden Glades Interchange to U.S. Route 1/Pinecrest
- SR 836 (Dolphin Expressway): Downtown to SW 137th Ave via MIA
- SR 874 (Don Shula Expressway): 826/Bird Road to Homestead Extension of Florida's Turnpike/Kendall
- SR 878 (Snapper Creek Expressway): SR 874/Kendall to U.S. Route 1/Pinecrest & South Miami
- SR 924 (Gratigny Parkway) Miami Lakes to Opa-locka

The Florida Highway Patrol is a law enforcement agency under the Florida Department of Highway Safety and Motor Vehicles with specific jurisdiction on the state's roads and highways. Miami-Dade is included in the Troop E jurisdiction, with Broward and Palm Beach counties being among Troop L jurisdiction.

=== Toll roads and express lanes ===
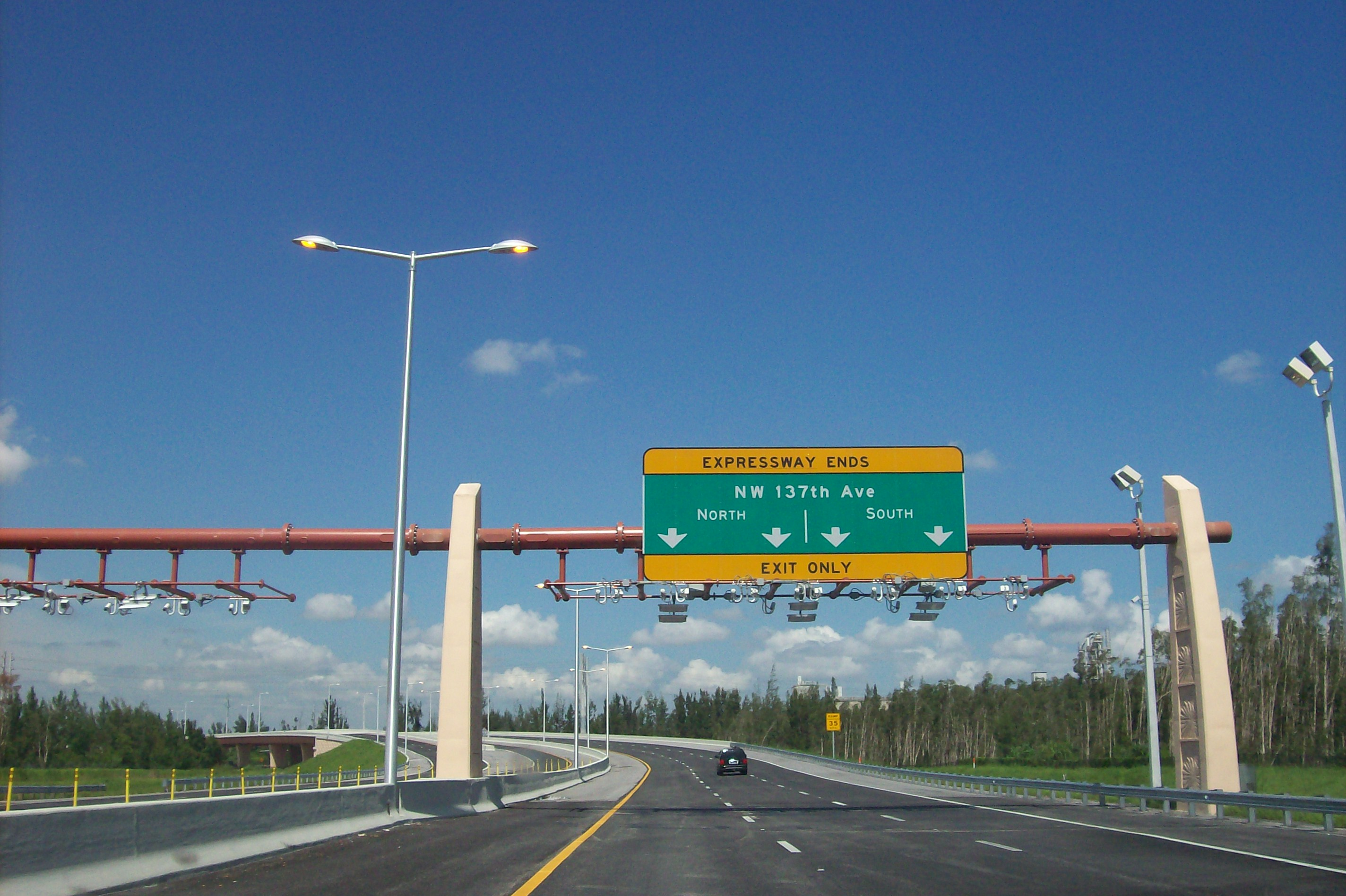
Open road tolling structure at the western terminus of the Dolphin Expressway

Several highways have a tolling system using SunPass and toll-by-plate open road tolling, with cash tolling being completely phased-out in 2014. Both the Dolphin and Airport Expressway have had an eastbound toll for years with westbound tolls implemented in November 2014. On November 15, 2014, the Miami-Dade Expressway Authority implemented their all-electronic open road tolling system on the Dolphin and Airport expressways.

On the Dolphin Expressway, motorists are tolled as soon as they enter the highway from any ramp, so toll evasion can no longer take place by exiting before reaching a booth, as before. The increased tolling was not well received by motorists in its first few days.

Additionally, I-95 has north and south express lanes from the I-195 interchange up to the Golden Glades Interchange. Work took place from 2011 to 2016 to extend the I-95 express lanes up to the Interstate 595 interchange near Fort Lauderdale. The price on the original express lanes varies depending on traffic, with tolls originally ranging from 25 cents up to seven dollars during rush hour or other heavy traffic. The toll range was raised to 50 cents up to US$10.50 in 2014, due partially to overuse. When the extension of the 95 express lanes to the Fort Lauderdale area opened in 2016, tolls rose even further, as was predicted by FDOT engineer Rory Santana. This has stirred controversy that the system, dubbed "Lexus lanes", is creating inequality among motorists. During high demand, tolls may range around US$20 for the approximately 22-mile (35 km) distance.

Florida's Turnpike is a north–south tolled highway that runs from Orlando to Homestead. The Homestead Extension of Florida's Turnpike (HEFT) runs through the outskirts of Miami-Dade County, while the main section runs a more central alignment through Broward and Palm Beach counties, is tolled throughout its entire route. Despite this, there is a project to add express lanes as a long stretch in South Miami-Dade is widened from six to ten lanes in places, and from ten to possibly 14 lanes for about a mile from SW 152 Street (Coral Reef Drive) to the Don Shula Expressway, adjacent to Graceland Memorial Park. Express lanes would presumably be an up charge over the existing tolls of the HEFT, which are already higher than the mainline north of Miami-Dade.

Tolled causeways include the Venetian Causeway (NE 15th Street) to Miami Beach, the Rickenbacker Causeway connecting Interstate 95 in Brickell to Key Biscayne, and the Broad Causeway connecting North Miami with Bay Harbor Islands and Bal Harbour.

A US$1.8 billion project to add tolled reversible express lanes in the median of Interstate 595, as well as to improve flyovers and connectivity to other highways was completed in 2014. The express lanes run for about 10 miles (16 km) between the Interstate 95 interchange to the western terminus at Interstate 75 and the Sawgrass Expressway in the western fringes of Broward County.

The Florida Department of Transportation has a plan to add tolled express lanes to every grade-separated highway in Miami-Dade and possibly Broward County, with some under construction as of 2014 including on the Palmetto Expressway and Interstate 75 from the Palmetto to Interstate 595. Toll road and express lane expansions continued greatly throughout the late 2010s and into the 2020s, with many of the projects to be completed by about 2022.

=== Other road infrastructure ===
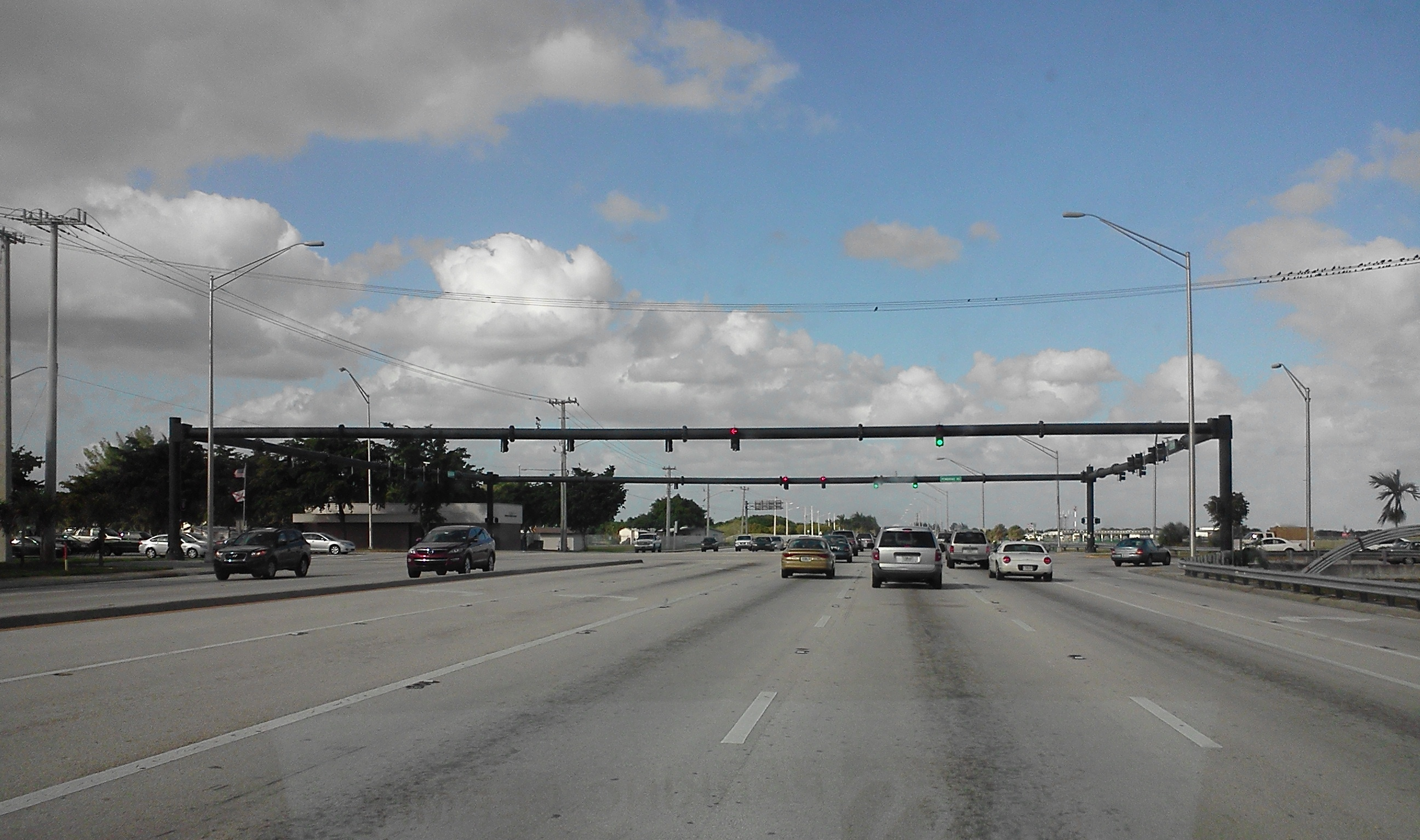
A large intersection between two surface roads in Broward County, University Drive intersects Pembroke Road

The grid throughout most of Miami-Dade County, with the exception of a few cities such as Coral Gables, is a simple axis-oriented numbered street pattern. Flagler Street forms the north–south divider and Miami Avenue forms the east–west divider between roads. Hence, all streets travel east–west and all avenues travel north–south, with the numbers increasing uniformly away from the dividers. Nearly all streets are referred to and indicated by number and all have a prefix (NW, NE, SW, SE) to determine their quadrant. Many of the busier, arterial roads, are also known by their common name, such as West 42nd Avenue, which is often referred to as LeJeune Road.

All streets and avenues in Miami-Dade County follow the "Miami grid," with a few exceptions, most notably Coral Gables, Hialeah, and Miami Beach. The grid pattern was adopted after World War I as the common naming system proved too confusing, particularly for mail carriers. The grid pattern is laid out primarily in 1 mi x 1 mi format based on a survey technique called metes and bounds. Within those larger squares, individual developers and cities platted the lots differently, and they do not always cross the major roads that create the macro-grid. These major roads usually are able to cross physical boundaries such as canals and highways, while the intermediate streets within them typically do not.

One off-grid neighborhood in Miami, The Roads, is thus named because its streets run off the Miami grid in an approximately 45-degree angle, and therefore all streets are known by their number with the suffix "Road" vs Street. Another busy off-grid road is Okeechobee Road (U.S. Route 27), which travels diagonally through the urban area from the northeast corner of Miami International Airport through Hialeah. Additionally, U.S. Route 1, known better locally as South Dixie Highway, Brickell Avenue and Biscayne Boulevard, does not follow grid pattern.

The majority of surface roads in Broward and Palm Beach Counties similarly follow a grid pattern. With notable exceptions including dead-ends and private roads in gated communities, which are common in South Florida.

While the Florida Department of Transportation operates and maintains most of the larger surface roads, even in incorporated areas, municipalities such as the City of Miami occasionally try to assume control over specific roads. These often include highly urban roads in the downtown area such as Brickell Avenue, where they feel the more broad scoped and highway oriented FDOT is inadequate in understanding the needs of such roads.

==== Causeways ====
With a high number of waterways and Biscayne Bay separating the mainland from the coastal peninsula, there are many causeways and draw bridges in South Florida. Three drawbridges are located in close proximity over the Miami River between downtown Miami and Brickell; the Second Avenue Bridge, the Miami Avenue Bridge, and the Brickell Avenue Bridge. The latter can cause significant delays with the heavy traffic on Brickell Avenue.

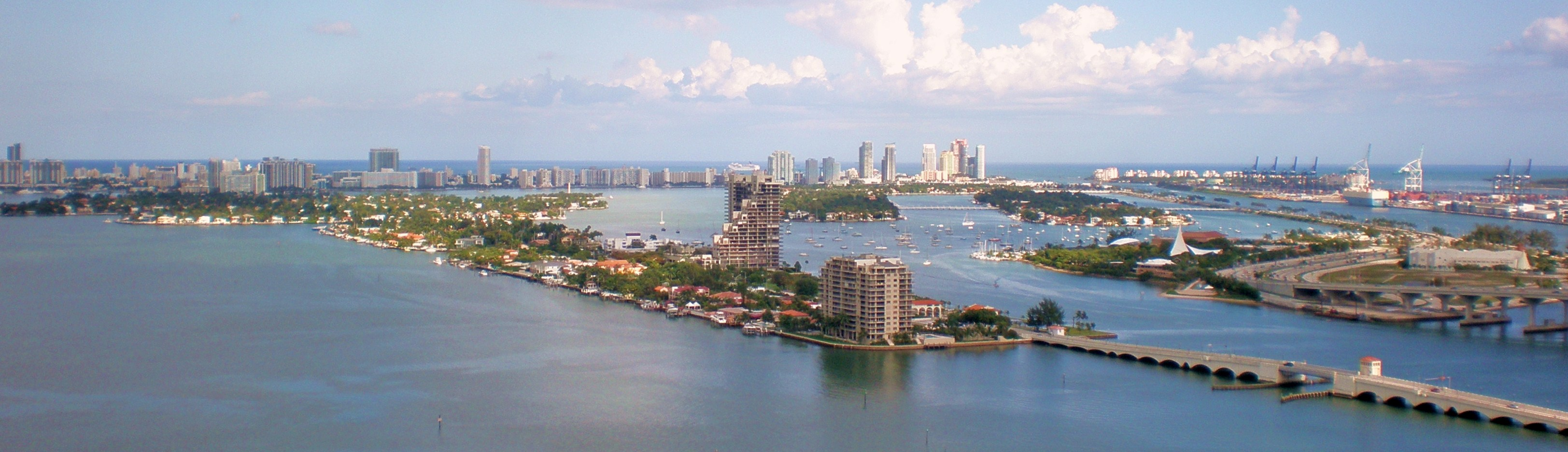
An aerial view of the islands of the Venetian and MacArthur causeways spanning Biscayne Bay with PortMiami (on right) and Miami Beach (in background)

Causeways in Miami, from south to north
Name	Termini	Year built
Rickenbacker Causeway (toll)	Brickell and Key Biscayne	1947
MacArthur Causeway / I-395	Downtown and South Beach	1920
Venetian Causeway (toll)	Downtown and South Beach	1912–25
Julia Tuttle Causeway / I-195	Wynwood/Edgewater and Miami Beach	1959
79th Street Causeway	Upper East Side and North Beach	1929
Broad Causeway (toll)	North Miami and Bal Harbour	1951
William Lehman Causeway	Aventura and Sunny Isles Beach	1983

Miami has six major causeways that span over Biscayne Bay connecting the western mainland, with the eastern barrier islands along the Atlantic Ocean. The Rickenbacker Causeway is the southernmost causeway and connects Brickell to Virginia Key and Key Biscayne. The Venetian and MacArthur causeways connect Downtown with South Beach. The Julia Tuttle Causeway connects Midtown and Miami Beach. The 79th Street Causeway connects the Upper East Side with North Beach. The northernmost causeway, the Broad Causeway, is the smallest of Miami's six causeways, and connects North Miami with Bal Harbour.

Broward and Palm Beach counties have a variety of causeways, which are generally smaller as Biscayne Bay narrows to Intracoastal Waterways to the north.

=== Vehicles for hire ===
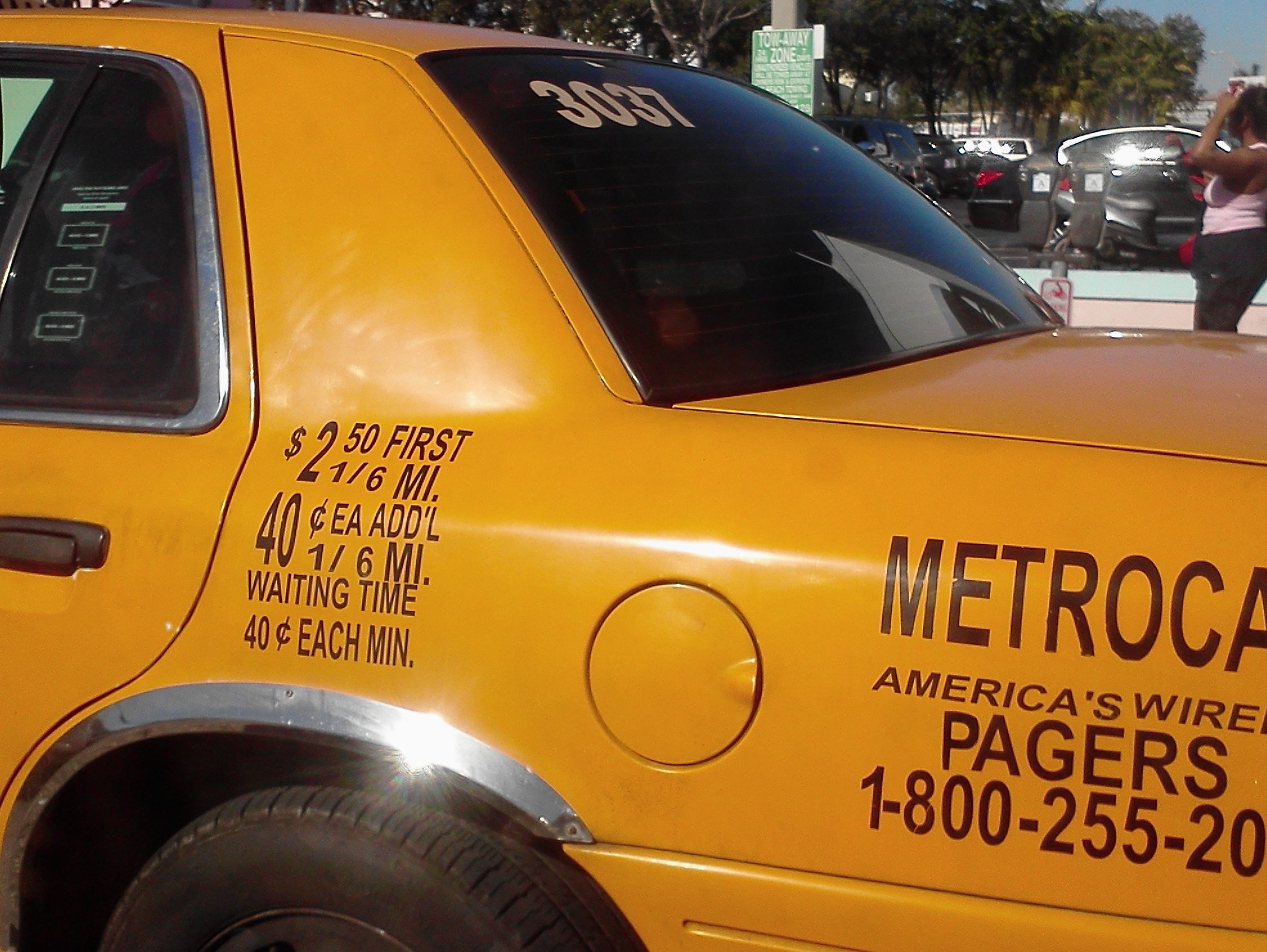
Fare displayed on a taxi in South Beach

Taxis are very common in Miami, especially around high tourist areas such as the airport and South Beach. Many charge an up front fee of about US$2.50 for the first 1/6-mile and 25 to 50 (usually 40) cents for each additional 1/6-mile. Waiting time is around 40 cents per minute. At this rate, a trip from the airport to South Beach costs about US$30 to US$35. Fare is almost always tracked automatically using a typical electronic toll calculator. Toll road fees are added to this and some cabs charge a US$2 fee for starting at the airport. Most companies display the rate of their taxis on the outside of the cab near the back door. All taxis in Miami-Dade must be registered and certified by the county.

As an alternative to taxis, Car2Go carsharing services were introduced to the city of Miami and some other small municipalities such as North Bay Village in July 2012. Uber and Lyft operate in Miami. Miami and Miami Beach are also served by Zipcar, a carsharing service.

=== Automobile dependency ===
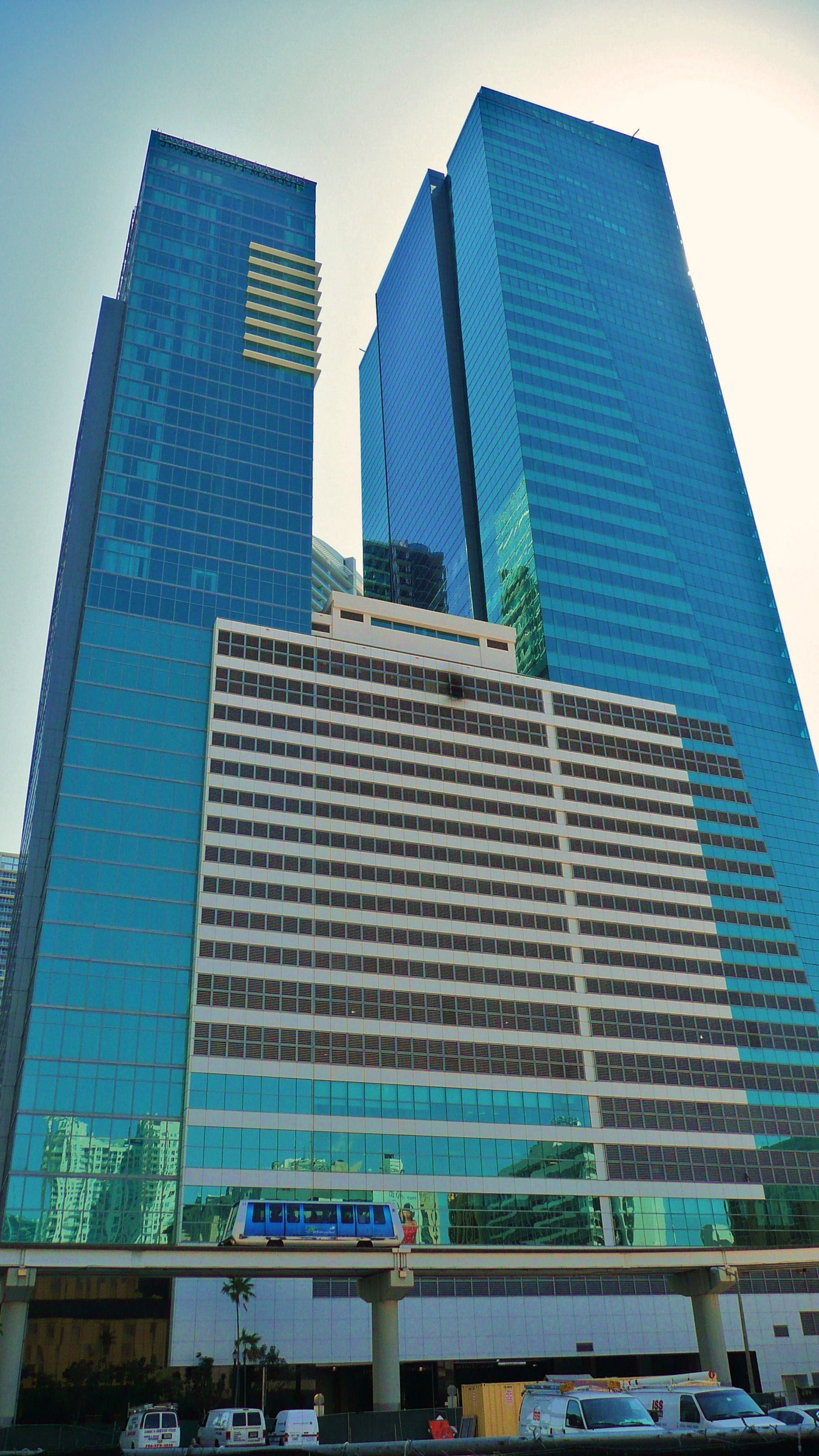
A parking garage constitutes nearly half the volume of this new high rise in Downtown Miami

The Miami area is known for its high level of automobile dependency and shortage of public transportation, which has led to an increasing traffic congestion problem throughout the county. Nearly 20% of household income is spent on transportation and Miami had the most decentralized office space of any metropolitan area in the United States, according to a study in 2000. Despite overwhelming support for public transportation to be funded instead of several new highways in the 1970s, Miami's Metrorail system was not operational until 1984 and as of 2014 has not yet reached the scope which was promised over 30 years ago. Ridership did not initially meet expectations in the early years of the system, averaging less than 10,000 riders per day. The system was not entirely finished, which led to criticism from then President Ronald Reagan, who claimed “it would have been a lot cheaper to buy everyone a limousine.” Those in favor of the mass transit system stated that the initially low ridership was due to the system being incomplete and not going where people needed it to, and noted that within a few years ridership was nearing 50,000 per day. Many of Miami-Dade County and Florida's politicians have been opponents to transportation alternatives which lessen traffic congestion. For example, both state governors Jeb Bush and Rick Scott denied funding for an intercity high-speed rail system in Florida. Two state senators tried to force Rick Scott to accept the funding, but the Florida Supreme Court denied the case and the funding was later directed to several other rail projects across the United States.

The half penny transit tax approved in November 2002 as part of the People's Transportation Plan was promised to fund at least the Metrorail Orange Line expansions in the short term, with a long term promise to build nearly 90 miles (145 km) of track and 50 stations for Metrorail, among other things. The plan stated that no more than five percent of tax proceeds would go to administration costs. A federal investigation in 2011 has led to Miami-Dade Transit's perception as an unaccountable organization.

Therefore, the Miami metropolitan area remains highly automobile dependent, with a prominent grid system made up of many wide, dangerous roads interlaced with various highways, most of which have tolls. Office buildings and other high-rises and semi dense communities are spread sparsely throughout the area, with a lowly defined central business district and no defined edge cities, leading to many long commutes in all directions. The lack of density and transit-oriented development also helped lead to the downfall of the Metrorail Orange Line North Corridor along NW 27 Avenue. Many of the buildings in downtown Miami sit atop large parking pedestals, often over 10 stories high, or have a separate, proprietary parking garage on site, such as the 14-story Southeast Financial Center parking annex. Other than the Government Center transit hub and the Miami Tower, both built in the 1980s in conjunction with the system, no buildings were built with a direct connection to the Metromover until Brickell City Centre in 2015. Despite this, nearly all the condos built in the 2000s and 2010s real estate boom were in the downtown area along the Metromover lines, leading to a doubling in ridership from 2000 to 2011, with daily average ridership now at over 30,000.

==== Traffic congestion ====
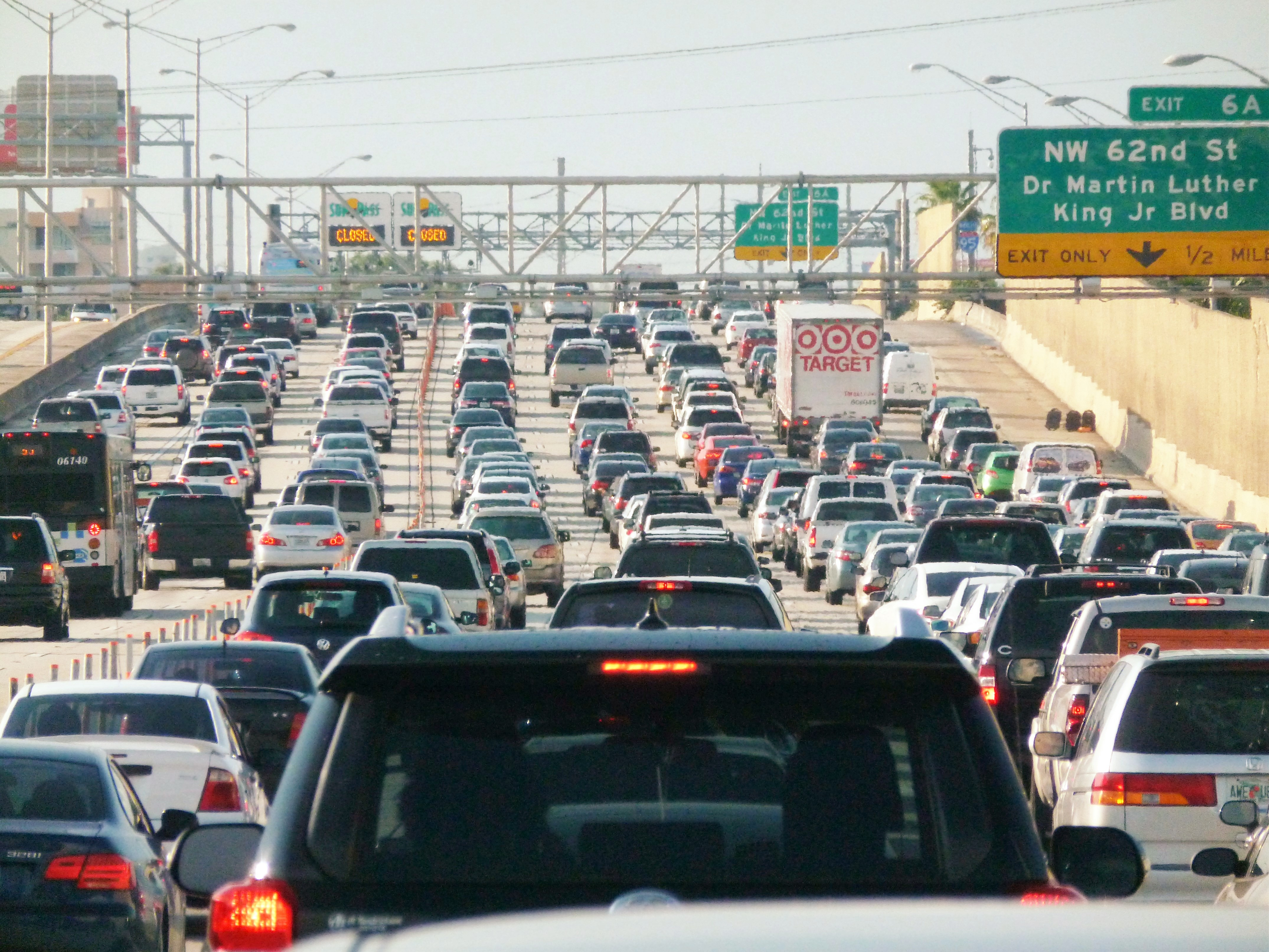
Afternoon (northbound) rush hour traffic on I-95.

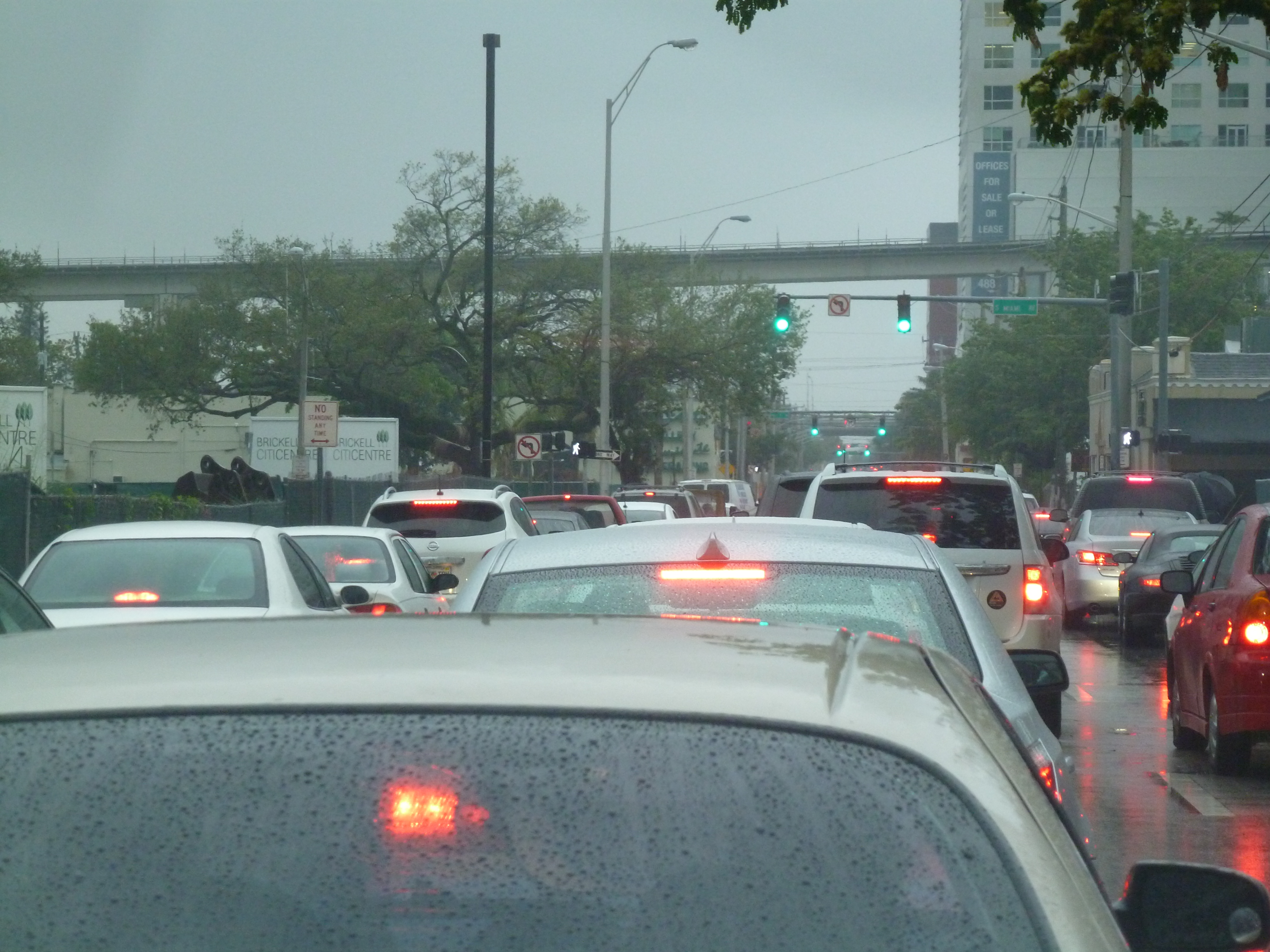
Westbound gridlock during afternoon rush hour in Brickell.

With ever-increasing population and traffic congestion, highways in South Florida are constantly being widened and upgraded with things such as express lanes to supposedly "ease delays." Ironically, the virtually endless expansion and reconstruction projects due to rapid growth and induced demand are part of the traffic congestion problem. The Miami-Dade area is consistently ranked as one of the worst regions in the country for traffic problems, and was ranked as the worst east coast metropolitan area for traffic in 2010. Parts of the Dolphin and Palmetto expressways as well as I-95 and Florida's Turnpike see near gridlock conditions at rush hour on a daily basis. According to a study by the American Highway Users Alliance (AHUA) in 2015, three of the nations worst bottlenecks are in Miami-Dade on the Dolphin and Palmetto Expressways. In the 2010s, increasing traffic delays were cited as an impediment to the rebounding office market. Similar to Los Angeles traffic, Miami-Dade has a loosely defined "rush hour" that extends much longer than just 8–9 a.m. and 5–6 p.m.

Miami also consistently ranks at or near the top in terms of worst drivers and number of accidents. In a 2013 study that looked at insurance and accident reports, Miami-Dade County was ranked "first in automotive fatalities, first in pedestrian strikes, first in the obscenity-laced tirades of their fellow drivers." Subsequently, Florida consistently ranks among the most expensive states for insurance premiums.

In 2007, Miami was identified as having the rudest drivers in the United States, the second year in a row to have been cited, in a poll commissioned by automobile club AutoVantage. Miami is also consistently ranked as one of the most dangerous cities in the United States for pedestrians.

Furthermore, greater Miami sees regular high speed police pursuits; the culture and geography of Miami and Miami Beach in the 1980s were the primarily influences for the fictional Vice City featured in the controversial Grand Theft Auto video game series. Indeed, the rate of motor vehicle theft in South Florida is well above the national average, with many cars ending up overseas.

==== Parking ====
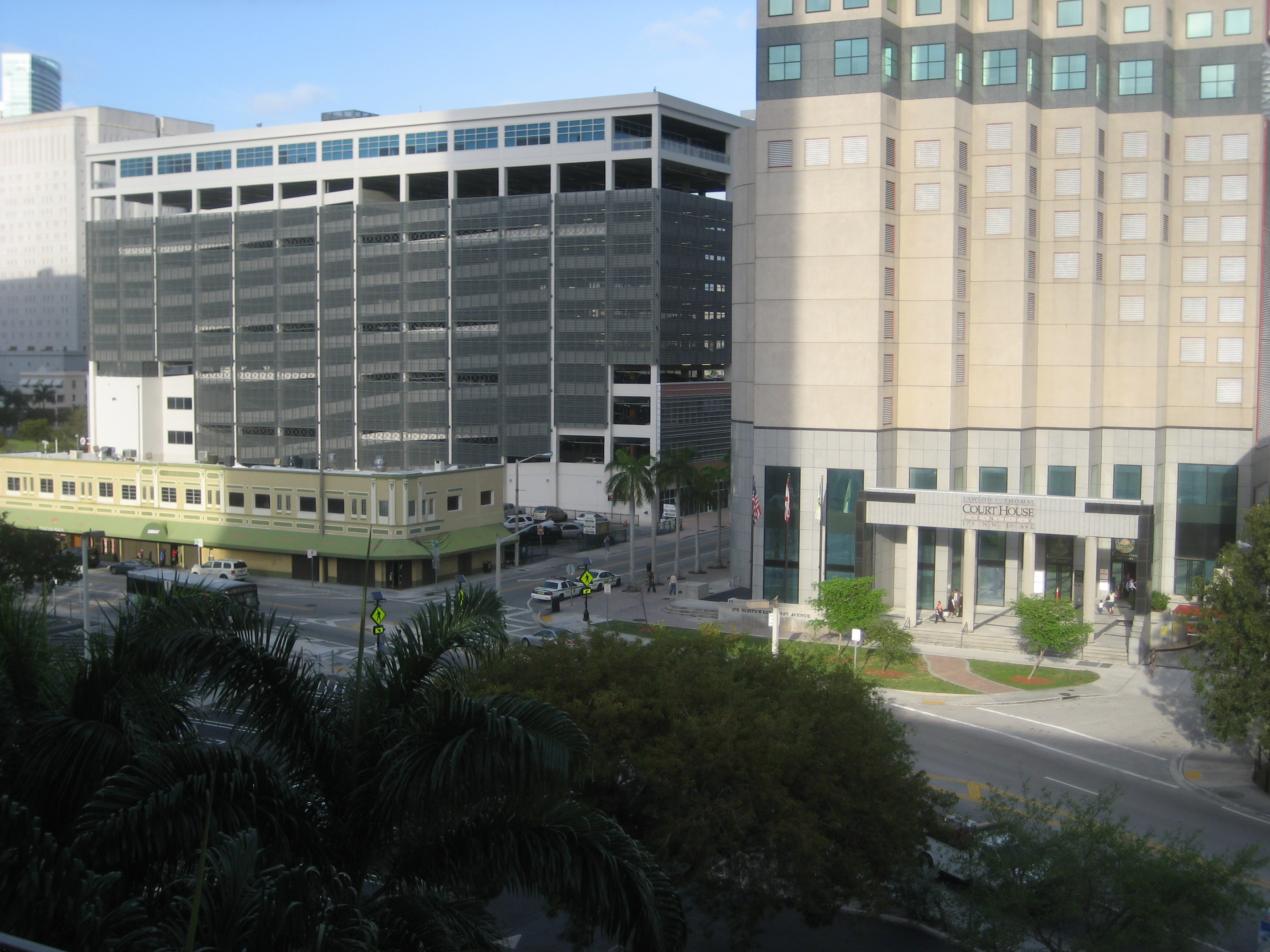
A large parking garage run by the Miami Parking Authority in the Government Center area of downtown Miami.

As with many large cities, parking in the Miami area can be expensive and scarce. Nearly all of the public parking in Miami-Dade county is metered, or charged by a daily flat rate, common with parking garages. Nearly all single parking meters in the region have been removed and replaced with master meters that accept both cash and credit card. The Miami Parking Authority operates 11 garages, 86 surface lots, and over 9,100 public parking spaces within the approximately 35 sq mi (91 km^{2}) city of Miami; adding to over 30,000 parking spaces in total. They enforce the streetside and surface lot parking meters and issue parking citations for violations. Due to high demand, a system of congestion pricing similar to highways has been considered for parking facilities in the downtown area.

Free parking at businesses for their customers is often strictly enforced, with clearly placed tow warning signs for abusing the space to go to other places, or for parking for an excessive length of time, especially in highly trafficked areas such as South Beach. Many businesses have no free parking available, or do for only limited amounts of time. Even suburban plazas and big box stores often have parking security to ensure both patron safety and designated use of parking. In many suburban residential areas, people do not have their own private garages as properties are small due to high land values. A parking pass, even for residents of a high rise residential building, often costs an additional fee over the rent or association dues.

South Florida began its forays into and robotic parking in the 2000s, though the New World Tower, built in 1965, has a mechanical parking garage. Two of these garages have been high-profile failures, even going as far as destroying cars and shutting down, leading to lawsuits and bankruptcies.

== Underground parking ==
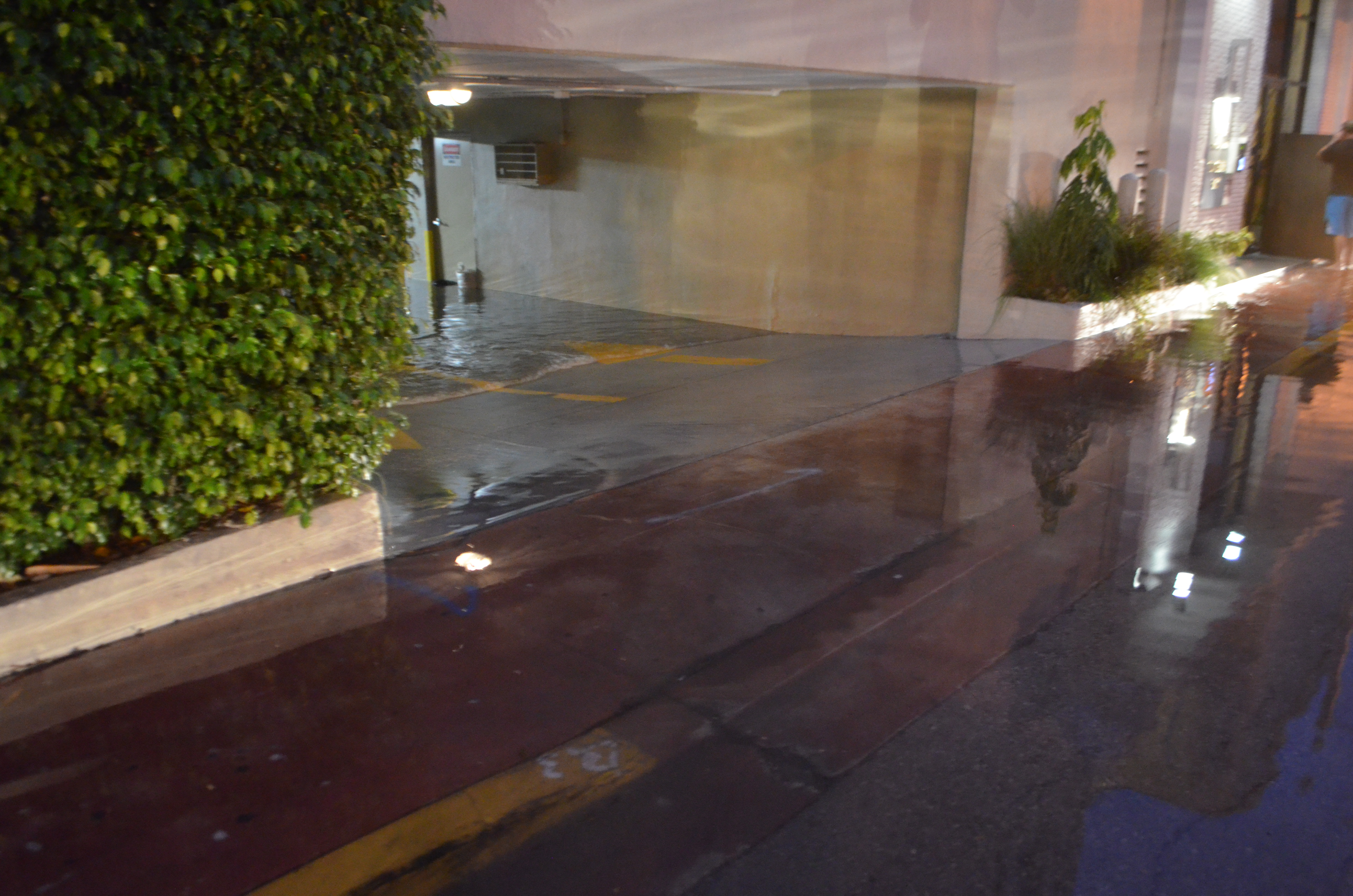
A partially below ground carpark in Miami Beach floods during the king tide season on October 12, 2016.

Unlike most other metropolises, underground development, including basements and below grade parking, is very rare in South Florida, even in city centres, due to the low elevation above sea level. Due to the porous geography, the inland water table is often similar to the sea level. Downtown Dadeland, built in 2005 in Dadeland, has two levels of underground parking over 7.5 acres (3.0 hectares), as does the 9-acre (3.6-hectare) Brickell City Centre, which completed major construction in 2016. In the 21st century, there was more pressure for underground parking due to zoning codes such as Miami 21. It requires above-ground garages to be lined with stores and avoid blank walls, aesthetics, pedestrian access, economics, and traffic control, among other things. Despite significantly higher engineering and construction costs, garages with 1.5 or more below grade levels are becoming more common for these reasons. The 2,600 sub-grade car park for Brickell City Centre covers 7 acres (2.8 hectares), and required installation of watertight slurry walls from the site elevation of 7 feet (2.1 m) NGVD to around -20 feet (6.1 m). Jade Signature in Sunny Isles Beach was built in 2014 with three levels of underground parking reaching up to 60 feet (18 m) below sea level right on the Atlantic coastline on barrier island.

== Aviation ==
South Florida is served by three international airports; Miami International Airport, Fort Lauderdale–Hollywood International Airport, and President Donald J. Trump International Airport, as well as several smaller, regional airports, including Kendall-Tamiami Executive Airport, Opa-Locka Executive Airport, Fort Lauderdale Executive Airport, and Boca Raton Airport.

=== Miami International Airport ===
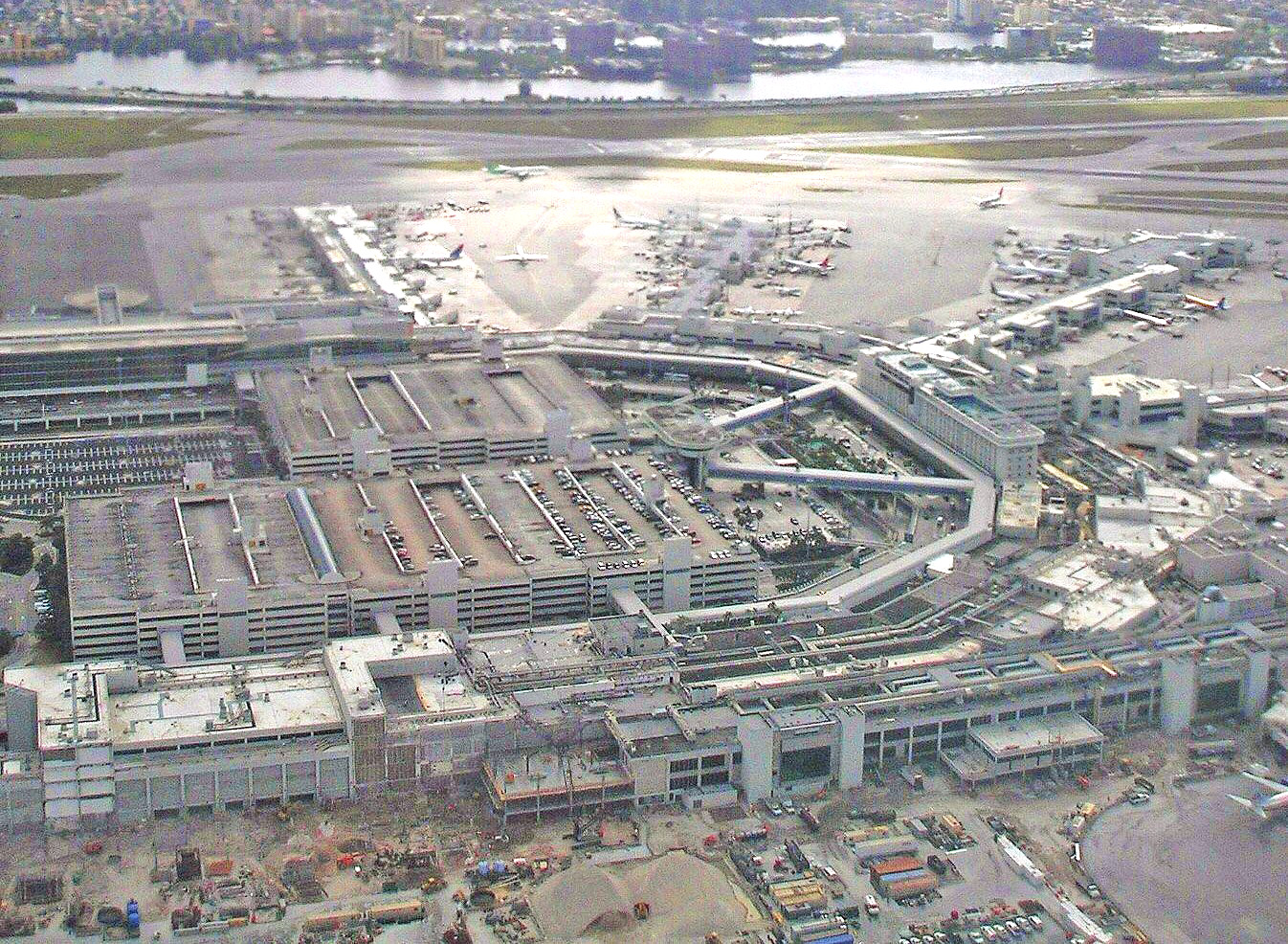
Miami International Airport served over 40 million people in 2013 and is the world's 10th-largest cargo airport.

Miami International Airport serves as the primary international airport of the Greater Miami Area. One of the busiest international airports in the world, Miami International Airport serves over 40 million passengers per year, with a steady trend of growth. As of December 2014, MIA is the only airport in the nation to offer flights from 100 carriers. That month also saw the return of the Eastern Air Lines trademark to Miami (via "New Eastern Air Lines").

Identifiable locally, as well as by several worldwide authorities, as MIA or KMIA, the airport is a major hub and the single largest international gateway for American Airlines, which the world's largest passenger air carrier since its merger with US Airways in 2013. Miami International is the busiest airport in Florida, and is the United States' second-largest international port of entry for foreign air passengers as of 2013, behind New York's John F. Kennedy International Airport; it is also among the largest such gateways in the world. The airport's extensive international route network includes non-stop flights to over seventy international cities in North and South America, Europe, Asia, and the Middle East.

The airport is served by taxis, several Metrobus routes, including the dedicated Airport Express, as well as several shuttle bus services available 24 hours a day. It also has the Miami Intermodal Center, consisting of a large rental car center and parking garage, and a rail station for Tri-Rail. It has been served by MIA Mover and Metrorail's AirportLink since 2012.

Two smaller, regional airports in Miami-Dade County are the Kendall-Tamiami Executive Airport and the Opa-locka Executive Airport.

==== Surface transportation infrastructure ====
The MIA Mover is a free, automated people mover connecting the Central Terminal of Miami International Airport to the Miami Intermodal Center. MIA Mover opened on September 9, 2011, and is 1.27 miles (2 km) long, running on an elevated track. MIA Mover has a top speed of about 40 miles per hour (64 km/h) and the capacity to move more than 3,000 people per hour.

The AirportLink connects the Metrorail system's Orange Line to the Miami Intermodal Center. The line connects to the Metrorail mainline at the Earlington Heights station. It consists of a 2.4-mile (4 km) elevated line with a construction cost of about US$500 million that opened in the summer of 2012.

The Miami Intermodal Center connects and centralizes the major forms of surface transportation to and from Miami International Airport. MIA Mover, Metrorail's AirportLink, Tri-Rail, Metrobus, the rental car center, all come together there. Phase I for Metrobus, MIA Mover, AirportLink, and automobiles were completed in 2012, while Phase II for Tri-Rail was completed in early 2015. It will also serve as a connection point between walking and bicycling.

=== Fort Lauderdale–Hollywood International Airport ===
Located just to the north, in Broward County, is another large airport, Fort Lauderdale–Hollywood International Airport (FLL). FLL is connected to the Tri-Rail commuter rail system via timed shuttle bus. The airport's connections to US 1 and Interstate 595 were undergoing renovations as of the 2010s, with a major project to extend one of the airport's runway ongoing as of 2014. The runway extension is a US$791 million project that required building a tunnel and adding fill over US 1 and the Florida East Coast Railway line.

=== President Donald J. Trump International Airport ===
President Donald J. Trump International Airport (PBI) is a public airport located approximately 3 miles (5 km) west of Palm Beach, Florida, in West Palm Beach. It primarily serves Palm Beach County. The airport is operated and maintained by Palm Beach County Department of Airports, which also manages three regional airports in the county. Road access to the airport is available directly from I-95, Southern Boulevard, and Congress Avenue. The airport is bordered to the west by Military Trail.

== Water transportation ==
The entire length of the South Florida metropolitan area is situated along the Atlantic Ocean. PortMiami in Miami-Dade and Port Everglades in Broward County are South Florida's two major seaports, while Port of Palm Beach is a smaller port located in Palm Beach County.

=== PortMiami ===
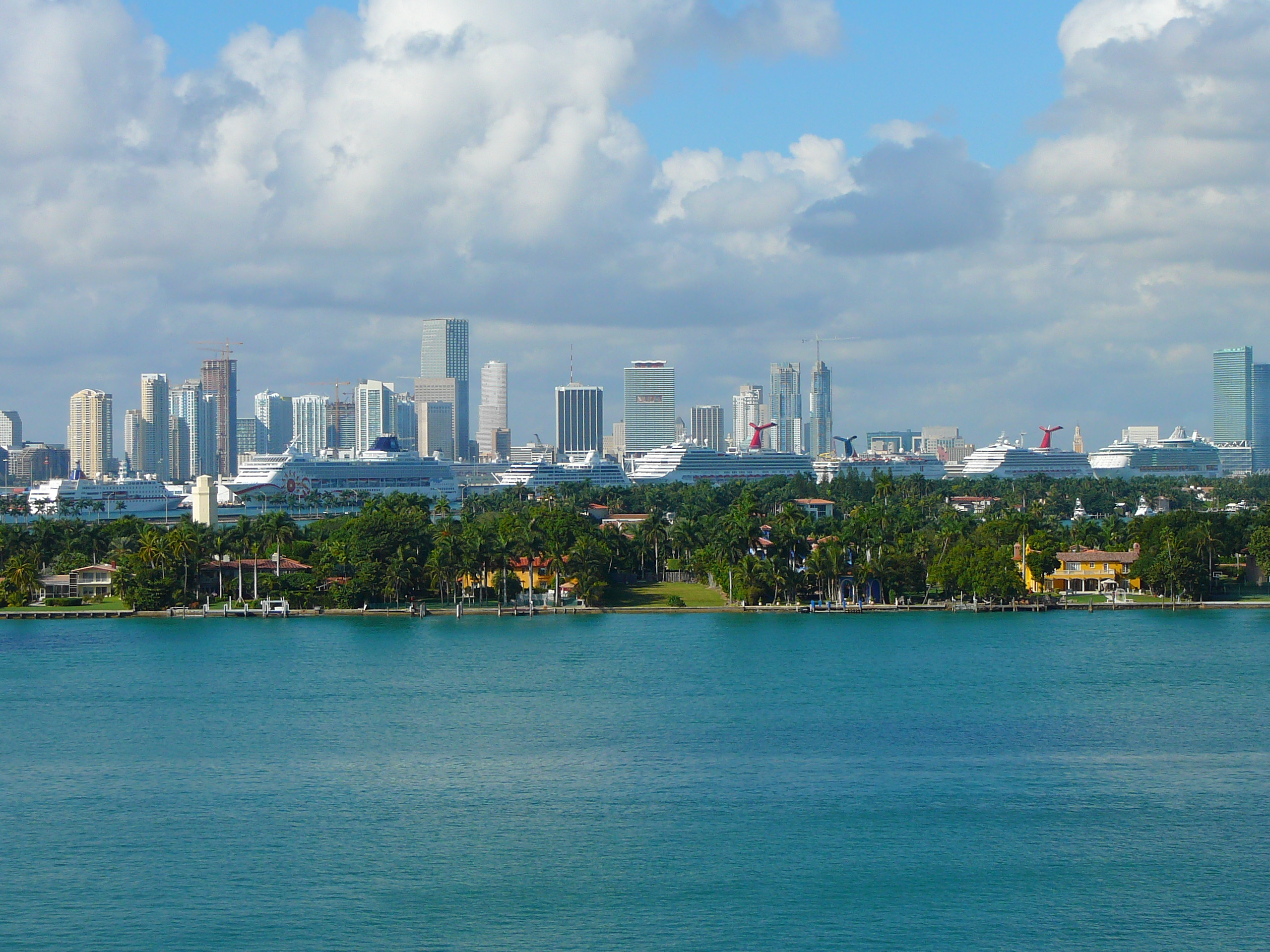
Miami's port as seen from Miami Beach in December 2007, with seven cruise ships docked.

PortMiami is the busiest cruise ship port in the world, with annual passenger traffic growing to over seven million (FY2023/2024). In addition, the port is a major cargo port. Located on Dodge Island adjacent to downtown Miami, it was for some time only accessible by automobile via a six-lane bridge known as the Port Boulevard causeway, which terminates on the city streets of downtown, or by rail. Rail service was disrupted by bridge damage that occurred during Hurricane Wilma in 2005. The damaged line, part of the Florida East Coast Railway, was repaired by 2014 renewing freight train access to the port. This also created some train traffic through Downtown Miami for the first time in nearly a decade. Additionally, to give the port direct interstate access and to help relieve downtown traffic, the $1 billion Port Miami Tunnel project to connect the port to Interstate 395 on Watson Island was completed in August 2014.

=== Port Everglades ===
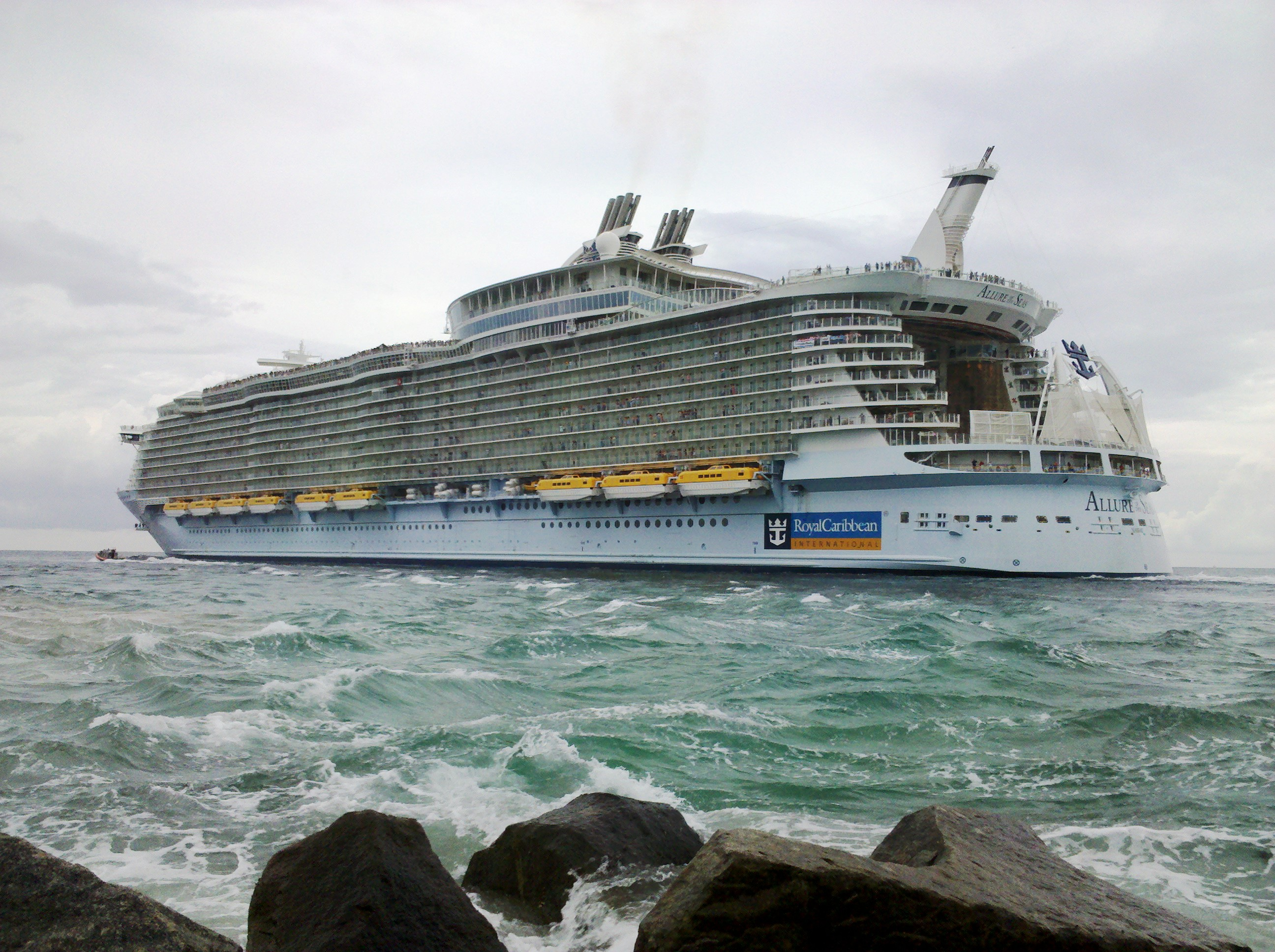
Port Everglades hosts the two largest cruise ships in the world as of 2014, Oasis of the Seas and Allure of the Seas, pictured leaving the port.

Port Everglades, located in Fort Lauderdale in Broward County, is another major seaport that is almost as busy as Port of Miami in terms of cruise and cargo traffic. It is also home to some of the largest cruise ships in the world, including the Oasis class Oasis of the Seas and Allure of the Seas. As with PortMiami, Port Everglades is of the busiest cruise ports in the world.

=== Boating ===
In addition to the ports, South Florida has many marinas and navigable waterways for both public and privately owned boats and yachts. The Miami River, which passes directly through the downtown Miami area, is publicly accessible and leads to inland marinas and cargo facilities. Fort Lauderdale has over 165 miles (266 km) of inland canals, owing it the nickname "Venice of America". Miami Beach has a long, inland canal system as well. Biscayne Bay is also popular sport and recreation such as fishing, sailing, and kayaking. There are also several recreational water taxis that gives sightseeing tours along the coast, such as the Miami Water Taxi, and the Fort Lauderdale-Hollywood Water Taxi.

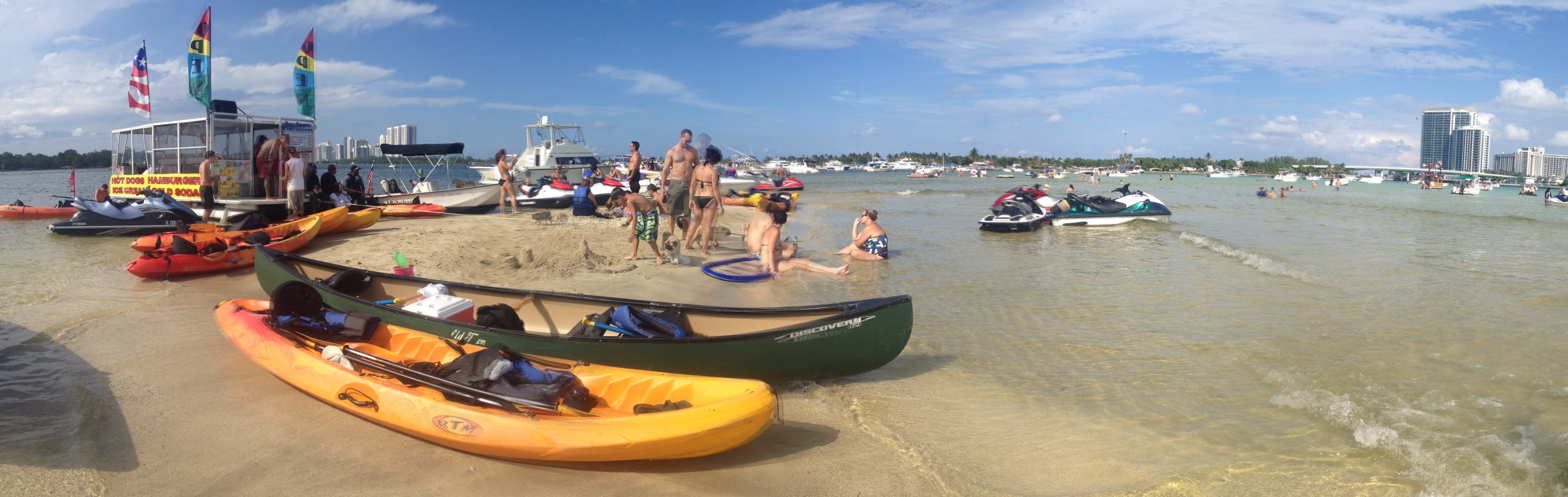
A popular shallow area created by a sandbar at low tide in northern Biscayne Bay near the Haulover Inlet in North Miami

== Public transportation ==
Metrorail, Metrobus, and Metromover, all operated by Miami-Dade Transit, comprise the majority of public transportation options in Miami-Dade County. Miami-Dade Transit also runs the Paratransit division's Special Transportation Service. The only significant public transportation systems currently offered in Broward County and Palm Beach County are standard bus systems, run by Broward County Transit and Palm Tran, respectively. South Florida's tri-county commuter rail system, Tri-Rail, is operated by the South Florida Regional Transportation Authority (SFRTA). There are also several localized public bus systems, such as the South Beach Local and the Coral Gables trolley.

The elongated and sprawled layout of the South Florida metropolitan area complicates the process of designing practical mass transit systems that serve the entire region, in contrast to more circular shaped metro areas where a hub-and-spoke system can efficiently route passengers or automobiles to their destination. Miami's existing Green Line and proposed Orange Line would only form the spokes, which could only emanate towards the west due to Miami's coastal location. A line towards the coast to the east, known as Baylink, has been long proposed but at high cost and being met with opposition. The entire urbanized South Florida metropolitan area, being about 110 miles (177 km) long but no more than 20 miles (32 km) wide in any part, as well as covering three counties, complicates the creation of a unified transit system. Additionally, Miami is a relatively young city that saw much of its growth during the automobile age, and continues to be very car oriented. South Florida ranked fourth in the nation in a 2000 study of metro areas for percentage of household income spent on transportation, with an average of 19%. Many of the downtown high rises have their own very large, above ground parking garages, which form the base of the towers. As of the 2000 census, it was the eighth most densely populated metropolitan area in the United States, with the city of Miami growing at about a 10% growth rate. Of large municipalities in the region, the city of Miami has the highest percentage of residents using public transportation regularly, at about 17%. Though the general trend for public transit in South Florida is for gradual growth in ridership numbers, percentages are offset as the majority of the region has seen steady increases in population over time. At a 4% commuter share, South Florida ties the Gainesville, Florida metropolitan area for the highest ratio of public transport usage in Florida.

The University of Miami is the only major institution of higher education with direct rapid transit access, via Metrorail's University Station. The Wolfson Campus of Miami-Dade College is located in Downtown Miami, transected by the Metromover loops.

A 2014 survey of 3,917 people in Miami-Dade County found that their highest priority was on-time performance, eclipsing by a narrow margin more frequent service and transit expansions to new areas.

As far as safety, a county report documenting incidents between December 2007 and August 2009 indicated that Metrorail had the highest amount of reported crimes with 1.5 per 100,000 riders, with battery being the main offense on both Metrorail and Metromover, while vandalism was number one for Metrobus.

From 2010 to 2015, Metrorail ridership greatly outpaced population growth, increasing by about 25%. Specifically, from 2014 to 2015, Metrorail and Metromover ridership remained fairly steady while Metrobus ridership continued to decline amid record low oil and gasoline prices that year. Despite this, there are more investments and expansions being explored for bus service than rail service, including new bus-rapid transit (BRT) and the covering of unprotected stations. By summer 2015, Metrobus daily ridership was around 210,000, nearly a 25% drop from previous records of over a quarter million. Through 2016 Metrobus ridership continued to fall sharply, while Metrorail ridership fell somewhat, and even Metromover had some slight declines that became steady into 2017.

=== Miami-Dade Transit ===
Miami-Dade Transit rail transit system maps

Metrorail

Metromover

Miami-Dade Transit runs the majority of public transport in Miami-Dade County including the four major systems of Metrorail, Metromover, Metrobus, and STS paratransit. In 2011, they were nearly shut down by the federal government due to audits that revealed extensive corruption. This came during a low economic time when service cuts were already in place and threatened even greater cuts.

==== Metrorail ====
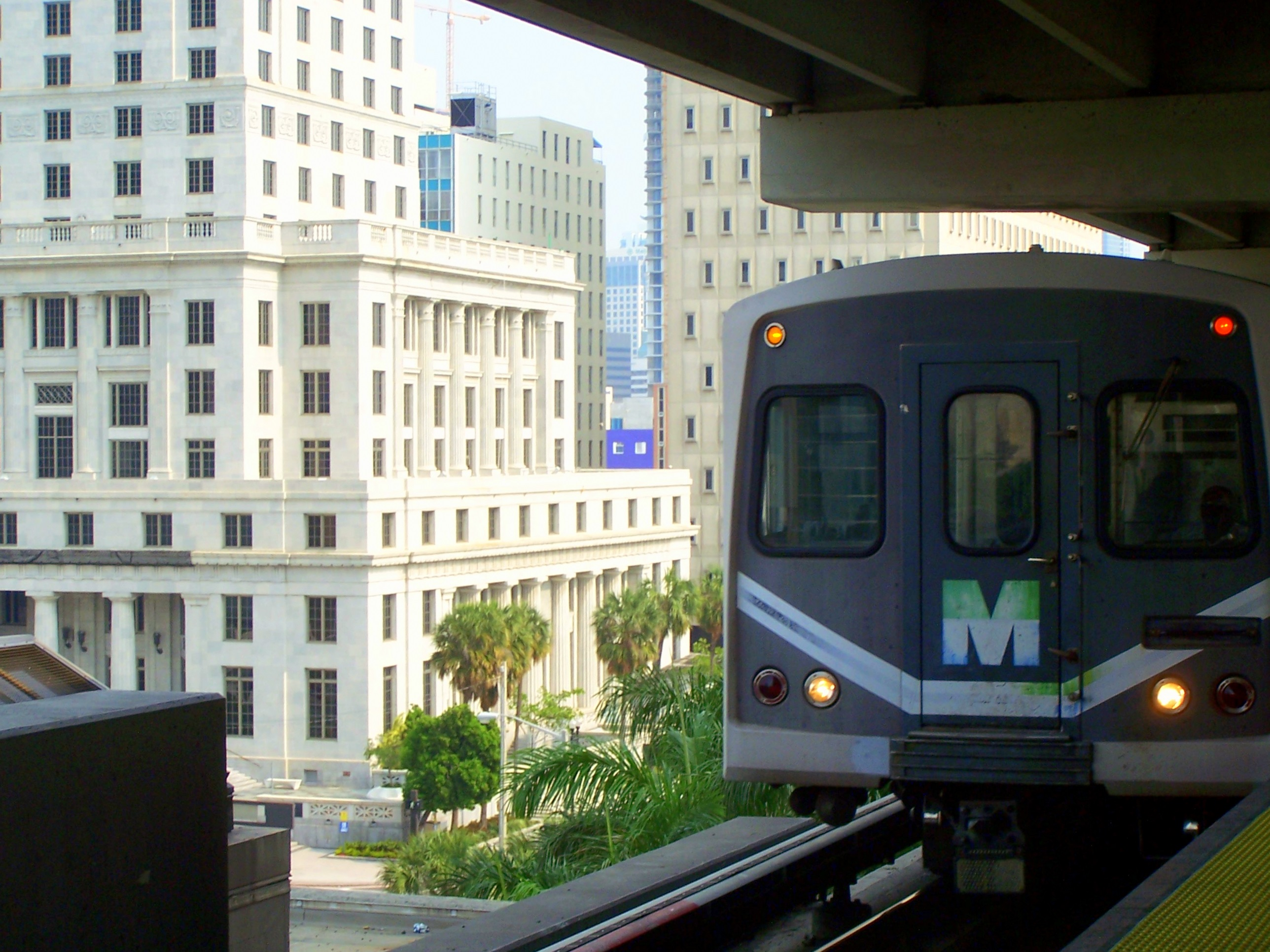
Metrorail train at Government Center station in Downtown Miami

Metrorail is Florida's only heavy rail rapid transit system, comprising two lines. The original, 22.4-mile (36 km) line, known as the Green Line, with 22 stations, starts at Okeechobee Station in northwest Hialeah, travels generally southeast to the CBD and Brickell, then travels generally southwest to Kendall over a historic, formerly Florida East Coast Railway, alignment. It has been in operation since 1984. In the 1970s, there was a plan to fund several more highways in South Florida, but it was decided that a mass transit option was more desirable. It was intended that the existing line would only be the beginning of the system, many more lines were planned. However, due to budget shortfalls and less than anticipated ridership, the only new line to be constructed is the 2.4-mile (4 km) AirportLink, which opened in 2012, and connects the Miami Intermodal Center with the Green Line, and merges with the latter south to Kendall.

Standard fare for both Metrorail and Metrobus was raised from $2.00 to $2.25 on October 1, 2013, for the first time since 2008 when fares were raised from $1.50, cited as being due to increasing operational expenses.

On July 16, 2008, Miami-Dade Transit announced that it would be replacing all fare collection methods with the EASY Card system by late 2009. The system replaces the old cash-/token-based system with one that automatically deducts fares at Metrorail fare gates from a reloadable card. The final station to start fare gate installation was Government Center in August 2009. Since the system launch on October 1, 2009, all passengers utilizing Metrorail must use either an EASY Card or EASY Ticket to enter stations.

Metrorail runs from 5 a.m. until midnight, seven days a week. On the portions of the system served by both the green Line and the Orange Line, trains arrive every five minutes during weekday rush hours, every 7 and 1/2 minutes during off-peak hours, and every 15 minutes after 7:30 pm until closing at midnight. Weekend service runs every 15 minutes for the entire day. For a brief period from 2003 until April 2004, there was 24-hour Metrorail service; between midnight and 5 am, trains arrived every 60 minutes. 16 of the 23 stations have dedicated, MDT-operated parking facilities, consisting of either a garage or a surface lot, with a charge that was raised from $4.00 to $4.50 during the 2013 fare hike. The stops that don't offer public parking are Tri-Rail and the five downtown-area stations, Civic Center, Culmer, Historic Overton/Lyric Theater, Government Center, and Brickell. However, there are multiple parking garages available in the vicinity of these stops.

Construction on the first segment of the Orange Line, Metrorail's AirportLink, began in June 2009; service to Miami International Airport was scheduled to begin in spring 2012, and after a slight delay service commenced in summer 2012.

The Miami-Dade County government is working with the Citizens Independent Transportation Trust oversight committee to receive money from the half-penny surtax approved by voters in 2002 in order to purchase new Metrorail cars, due to begin construction in late 2015. The 136 Metrorail vehicles will be built in Miami-Dade County at a recently constructed facility by AnsaldoBreda. Full roll out is expected by the year 2018.

==== Metromover ====
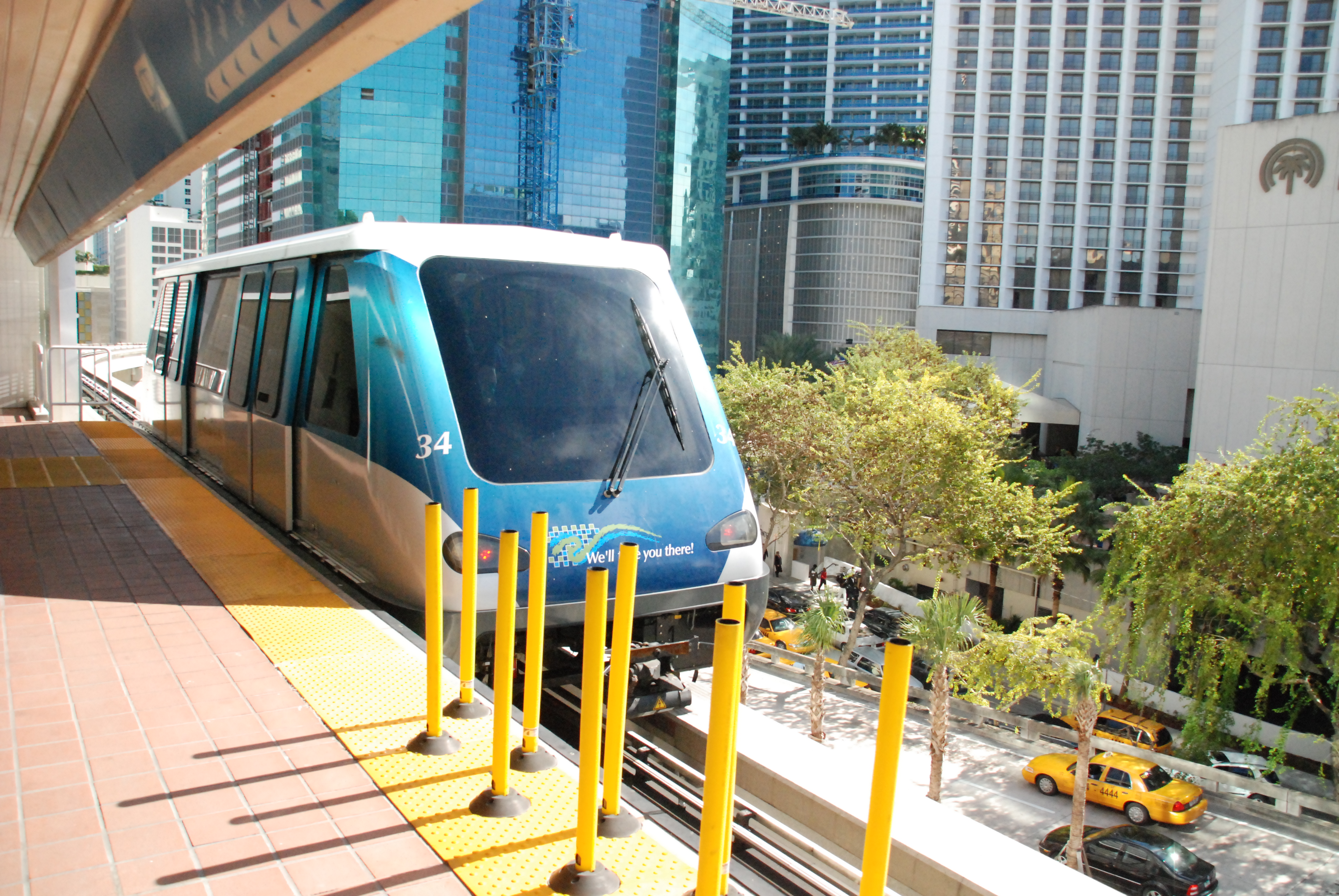
A Metromover train at Knight Center station in Downtown Miami

Metromover is a free, automated people mover (automated guideway transit) system, similar to an elevated light rail, that operates on three loops totaling 4.4 miles (7 km) of elevated track and 21 stations in the Central Business District, "Arts & Entertainment District", and Brickell. The main Inner Loop opened in 1986, and the Omni (north) and Brickell (south) extensions opened in 1994. The Metromover gained popularity significantly when the 25-cent fare was lifted in 2002. Since then it has been free to ride. Metromover is used heavily by those who live, work, or attend events in downtown, with ridership doubling from 2002 to 2014, as well as by tourists staying in downtown to get to attractions or just to get a free tour of the downtown cityscape. It is also used by those who commute into the city using Metrorail and Tri-Rail. Metrorail and Metromover are connected at the Government Center and Brickell stations, and even by construction workers commuting to downtown-area projects. Tri-Rail and Metrorail are connected at the Tri-Rail and Metrorail transfer station. Metromover headways vary from about two to five minutes depending on loop and overlap.

===== Stations =====
The Metromover currently operates 21 stations, and combined with the Metrorail, the entire metro system operates 45 stations. Metromover stations are located at approximately every two blocks in the Greater Downtown area, where Metrorail stations are located at about a mile apart along its line.

Until 2015, all stations except for Knight Center station located in the bottom of the Miami Tower and Government Center station located at the bottom of the Stephen P. Clark Government Center, both built in conjunction with the system in the 1980s, were stand alone units with no direct integration with other developments. In 2015, the first phase of the very large Brickell City Centre project included a renovation of the Eighth Street station that included a direct connection. Miami Worldcenter, which is being developed piecemeal, may incorporate two Metromover stations. In 2011, the proposed Resorts World Miami mixed-use casino, planned near the Arts & Entertainment District area north of downtown, had plans to modify the Metromover line where it passed the demolished Miami Herald building, as well as building a new station into its development. The project stalled when a gambling bill did not pass the state legislature. Various other high-rise projects have also proposed a Metromover integration. One is the original design for Brickell Flatiron, which would be built over the track with a hole for the line to pass through it. Another is the long-proposed One Bayfront Plaza skyscraper, whose original, as well as its latest known designs are planned to have a pedestrian bridge connecting it to the Bayfront Park station. As far as expansion, an extension to the Port of Miami and then to South Beach has been considered among others, but none have yet made it beyond the planning and impact study stages As of 2015.

==== Metrobus ====
The Metrobus network provides bus service throughout Miami-Dade County 365 days a year. It consists of more than 100 routes and about 817 buses and 9000 stops, which connect most points in the county and part of southern Broward County as well, to connect with the Broward County Transit bus system. Standard fare is US$2.25. Seven of these routes operate around the clock: Routes 3, 11, 27, 38, 77, 79 and 100. Routes 400 South Owl and 401 North Owl operate from 12am to 5am, with the 400 route replacing overnight Metrorail service. Most other routes operate from 5 am to 11 pm. All Metrobuses are wheelchair accessible, in compliance with the Americans with Disabilities Act of 1990.

===== South Dade Transitway =====
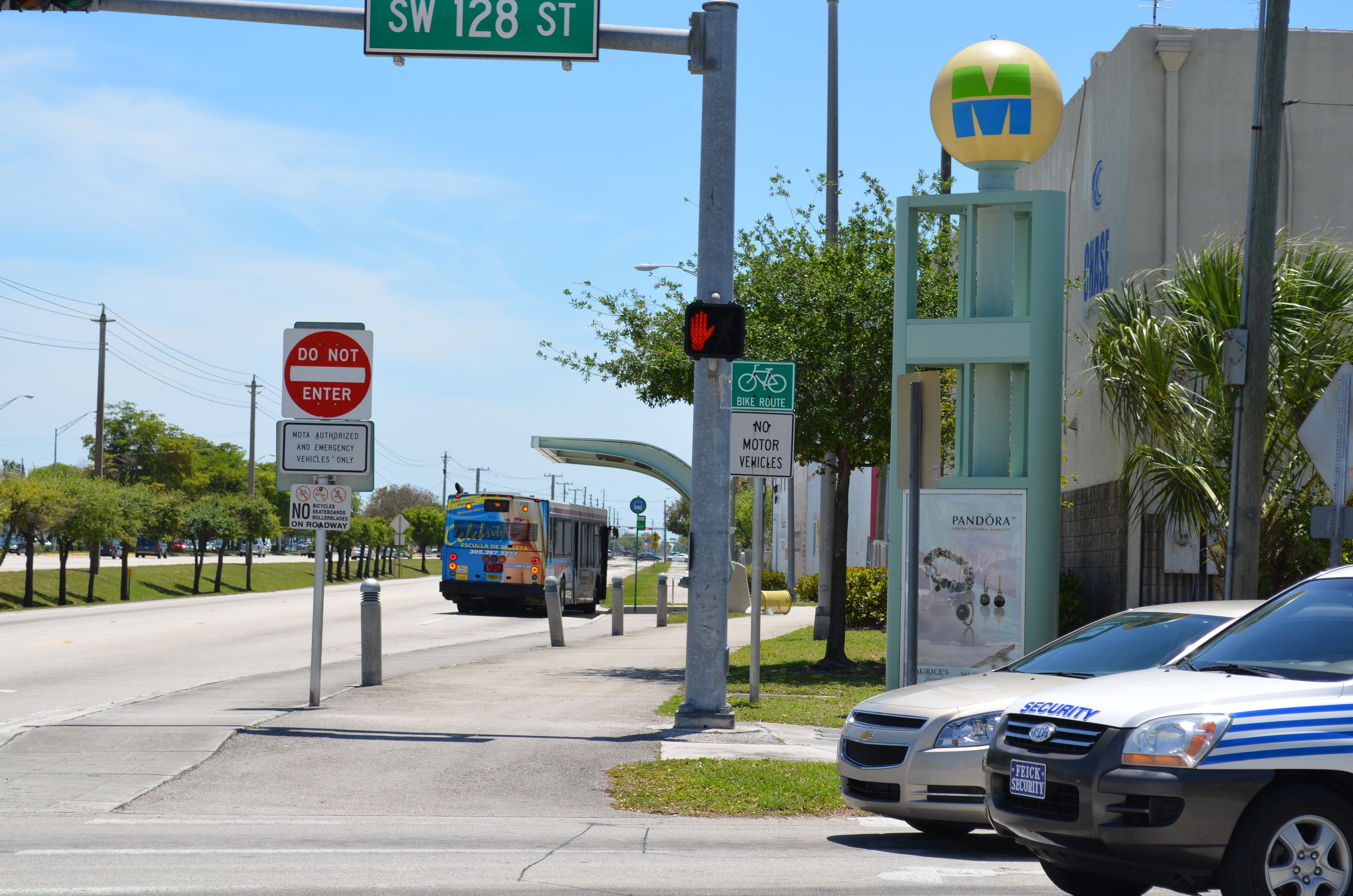
The busway has no grade separation, requiring several at-grade crossings with arterial roads

The South Dade Transitway is a basic bus rapid transit system, or busway, in southern Miami-Dade County. It began operating on February 3, 1997, and was extended in April 2005. The final 6.5-mile (10.5 km) segment of the Busway extension to Florida City opened on Sunday, December 16, 2007. The Busway features 28 stops, all of which have been converted to light rail style stations, with a total of 56 shelters. A multi-use path known as the South Dade Rail Trail stretches the length of the Busway, connecting with the MetroPath at Dadeland South station. In the future, the corridor would be converted into a gold standard electric bus rapid transit line.

The Busway has been the site of many accidents at the unique intersections where arterial roads meet the virtually adjacent South Dixie Highway.

=== Broward County Transit ===
Broward County Transit (BCT) is the public transit authority in Broward County, operating a county-wide bus system covering over 400 square miles (1,036 km^{2}) of the greater Fort Lauderdale area. It is the second largest transit system in Florida (after Miami-Dade Transit). It currently operates the only public bus system in Broward County. Besides serving Broward County, it also serves portions of Palm Beach County and Miami-Dade County where the systems share transit hubs such as Aventura Mall in Miami-Dade County.

=== Palm Tran ===
Palm Tran is a bus system run by the Palm Beach County Government, serving Palm Beach County. Standard (Adult) one-way fare is US$1.50 (people eligible for the reduced fare such as students and senior citizens pay US$0.75). For US$3.55 an unlimited all-day pass (US$2.25 for reduced fare). There are no free transfers except to Tri-Rail or Broward County Transit. Daily and 31-day unlimited ride passes are also available for purchase. There are 31-day unlimited passes that are available reduced or regular costing US$55 and US$40 respectively. All Palm Tran buses have bicycle racks on the front, capable of holding two bikes.

=== Other buses and trolleys ===
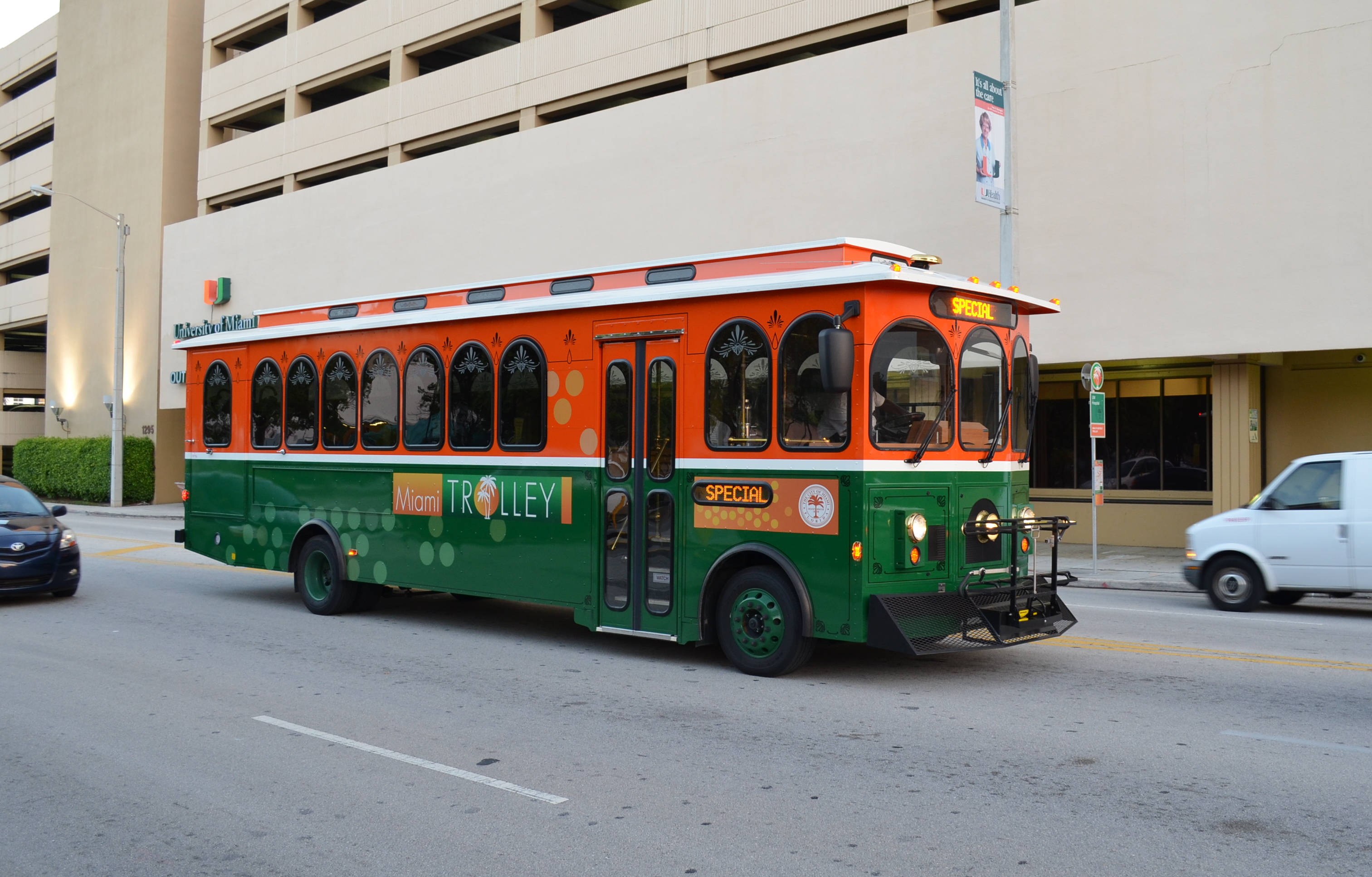
Miami Trolley passing through the Miami Health District

South Beach operates its own local bus system known as the South Beach Local. The fare is only 25 cents. Streetcar style trolley-replica buses have been implemented in over a dozen cities in Miami-Dade and Broward Counties, such as downtown Miami, Coral Gables, and Hollywood. Since it began operation in 2003, the free Coral Gables Trolley (bus) has moved over four million commuters around downtown Coral Gables with over 5,000 riders per day, freeing up 750 local parking spaces and reducing car trips by 20% along its route. The city of Hollywood operates a trolley route serving its downtown area and Hollywood Beach. In April 2012, Miami initiated its own trolley system with loops around downtown similar to the Metromover as well as to the new Marlins Park and Civic Center. The Miami Trolley expanded to many routes over the next few years. Educational institutions such as University of Miami (Hurry 'Cane Shuttle) and Florida International University (CATS Shuttle) operate free shuttle-bus services on and around their campuses. In addition, FIU offers a Golden Panthers Express shuttle between their main campus and the Biscayne Bay Campus.

== Rail transportation ==
Miami-Dade County is located at the southern end of two prominent rail lines, the state-owned South Florida Rail Corridor, and the Florida East Coast Railway. The region has a commuter rail system (Tri-Rail), which uses the South Florida Rail Corridor line along with Amtrak. South Florida was planned to be connected to Orlando and Tampa by the government funded Florida high speed rail system; however that plan was cancelled in 2011. In 2014, Florida East Coast Industries began construction on a higher-speed rail system named Brightline, which now currently connects between Miami and Orlando. The Northeast Corridor Rapid Transit Project plans to add commuter rail on the Florida East Coast Railway between MiamiCentral and Aventura.

=== Intercity and higher-speed services ===
==== Amtrak ====
Miami is the southern terminus of Amtrak's Atlantic Coast services, running two lines, the Floridian and the Silver Meteor, terminating in Chicago and New York City, respectively. The Miami Amtrak Station is located in the suburb of Hialeah near the Tri-Rail/Metrorail Station on NW 79 St and NW 38 Ave.

There are five other Amtrak stations in the region; Hollywood, Fort Lauderdale, Deerfield Beach, Delray Beach, and West Palm Beach. All of these are shared with Tri-Rail; all but Delray Beach date back to the 1920s when the line was operated by the Seaboard Air Line Railroad. The newer Delray Beach station replaced the Delray Beach Seaboard Air Line Railway Station located a few blocks down the line.

==== Tri-Rail ====
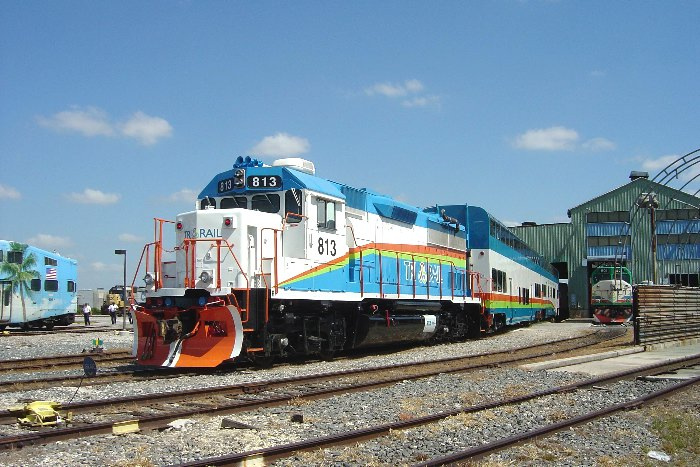
A Tri-Rail locomotive and experimental DMU coach in the CSX Hialeah Yard

Tri-Rail is a 70.9-mile (114 km), 18 station commuter rail train system, operated by the South Florida Regional Transportation Authority (SFRTA) that runs north and south through Palm Beach, Broward, and Miami-Dade counties, terminating at Miami International Airport in Miami-Dade County. Tri-Rail is split into six zones. As of 2014, standard fare ranges from US$2.50 to US$11.55 and is determined by the number of zones travelled through and whether it is a one way or round trip. A standard fare of US$100 for a month is also available. Many Tri-Rail stations have free parking facilities, with a total capacity of about 4,000 vehicles, which are known to fill up.

In 2015, Tri-Rail's southern terminus moved into a new station at Miami Intermodal Center. In 2017, the SFRTA voted to contract out operations to Herzog Transit Services for a 10-year contract beginning in July of that year.

Tri-Rail proposed adding additional service to a more easterly alignment on the Florida East Coast Railway freight line in a project known as the "Coastal Link." This would bring it closer to the major population centers of South Florida, of which the FEC line passes through about 22. This would also bring it directly into Downtown Miami, where it would terminate at the MiamiCentral transit hub. Service would also eventually extend northward to Jupiter, which would more than double Tri-Rail's current system length. In 2024, Tri-Rail began operating trains between the Metrorail Transfer station and MiamiCentral.

==== Brightline ====
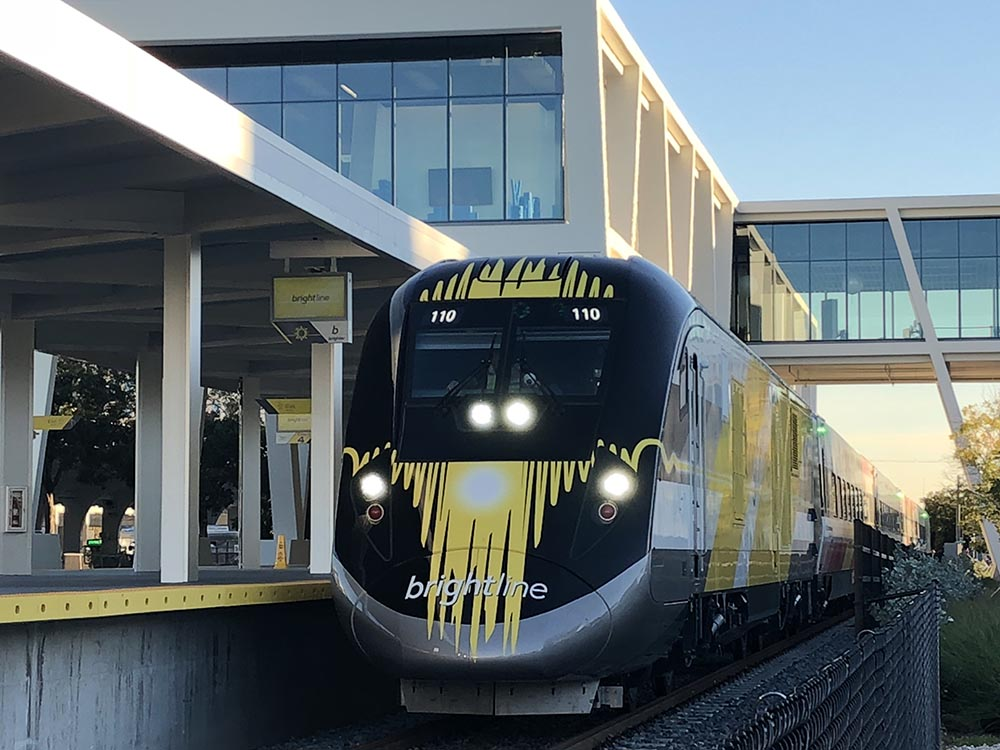
A Brightline train at Fort Lauderdale

Twice a Florida High Speed Rail system was proposed to connect Miami with Orlando and Tampa Bay. First in 2000, which was opposed by then Florida governor Jeb Bush, then in 2009 the plan was revived with a grant offered under Obama's American Reinvestment and Recovery Act. However, Florida governor Rick Scott denied the funding in 2011, citing that it was still a risk due to uncertain ridership estimates and actual construction and maintenance costs, which could have been a burden to taxpayers. Many were disappointed in Scott's vehement denial of the money. 26 Florida senators from both political parties signed a letter to United States Secretary of Transportation Ray LaHood encouraging him to ignore Scott's decision, and even former governor Jeb Bush, who was against the previous high-speed rail proposal, was surprised by Scott's actions. The money was ultimately directed to other states and the plan killed.

In 2012, Florida East Coast Industries (FECI) announced a proposal for a privately owned and operated higher-speed rail system, All Aboard Florida (now known as Brightline), which would connect Orlando and Miami mainly along the Florida East Coast Railway (FEC) corridor. While not truly high-speed rail, the train would reach a speed of 125 miles per hour (201 km/h) on a 40 miles (64 km) section of new track connecting Cocoa and Orlando. It was originally said that the system could be operational by 2014. Permits, planning and funding among other things delayed this; however, by 2014 construction had begun. The system was initially funded for the segment between downtown Miami and West Palm beach, partially by selling bonds. Construction of the MiamiCentral station in Government Center began in 2014, with some of the additional tracks and site work on the other two South Florida stations taking place by 2015. Service between West Palm Beach and Fort Lauderdale opened in January 2018 and the extension to MiamiCentral opened in May. In 2022, two additional stations in Boca Raton and Aventura were added. The extension to Orlando International Airport started service in 2023, and a future rail expansion to Tampa is currently in the planning stages.

== Bicycling ==
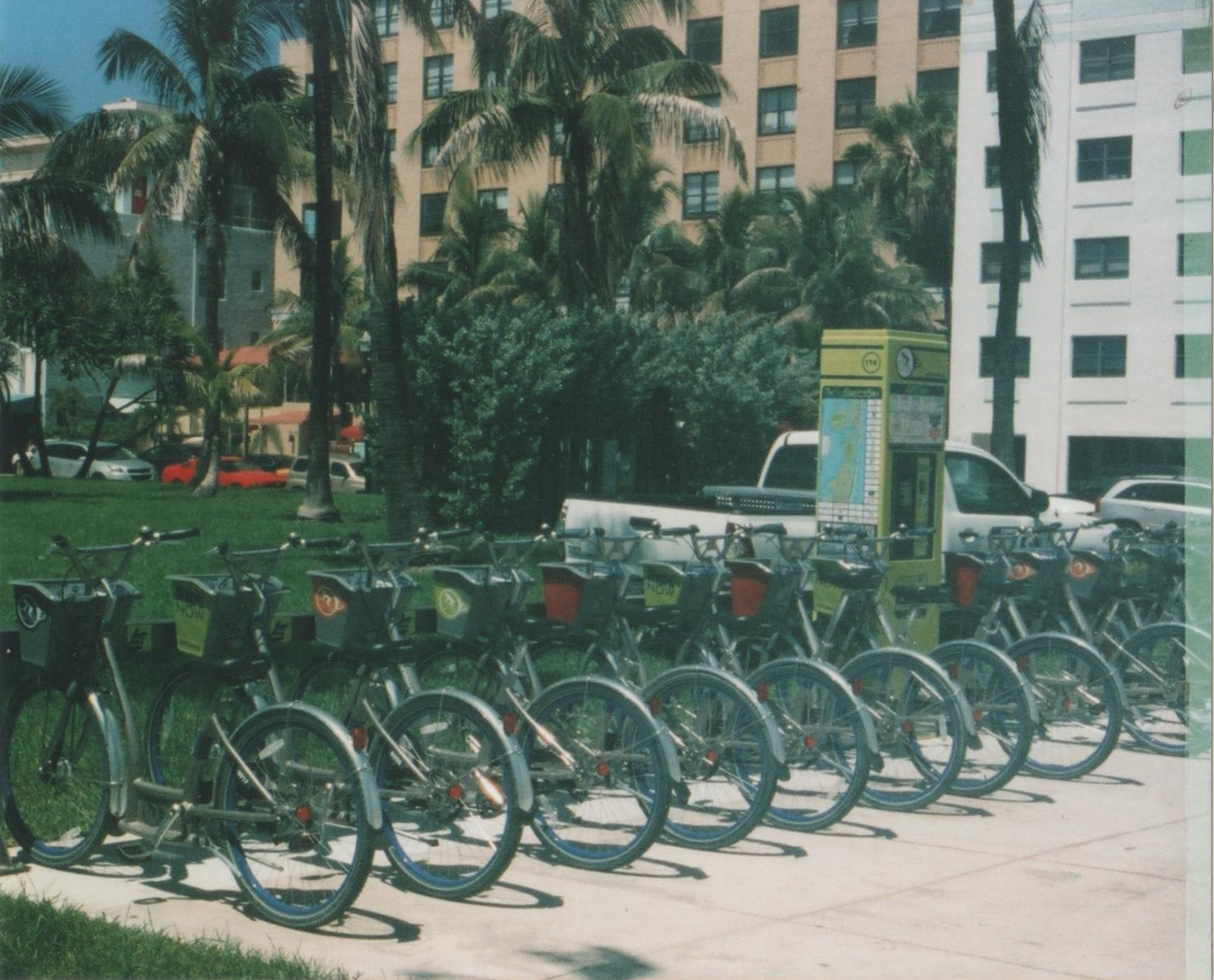
A DecoBike BikeShare rack in South Beach

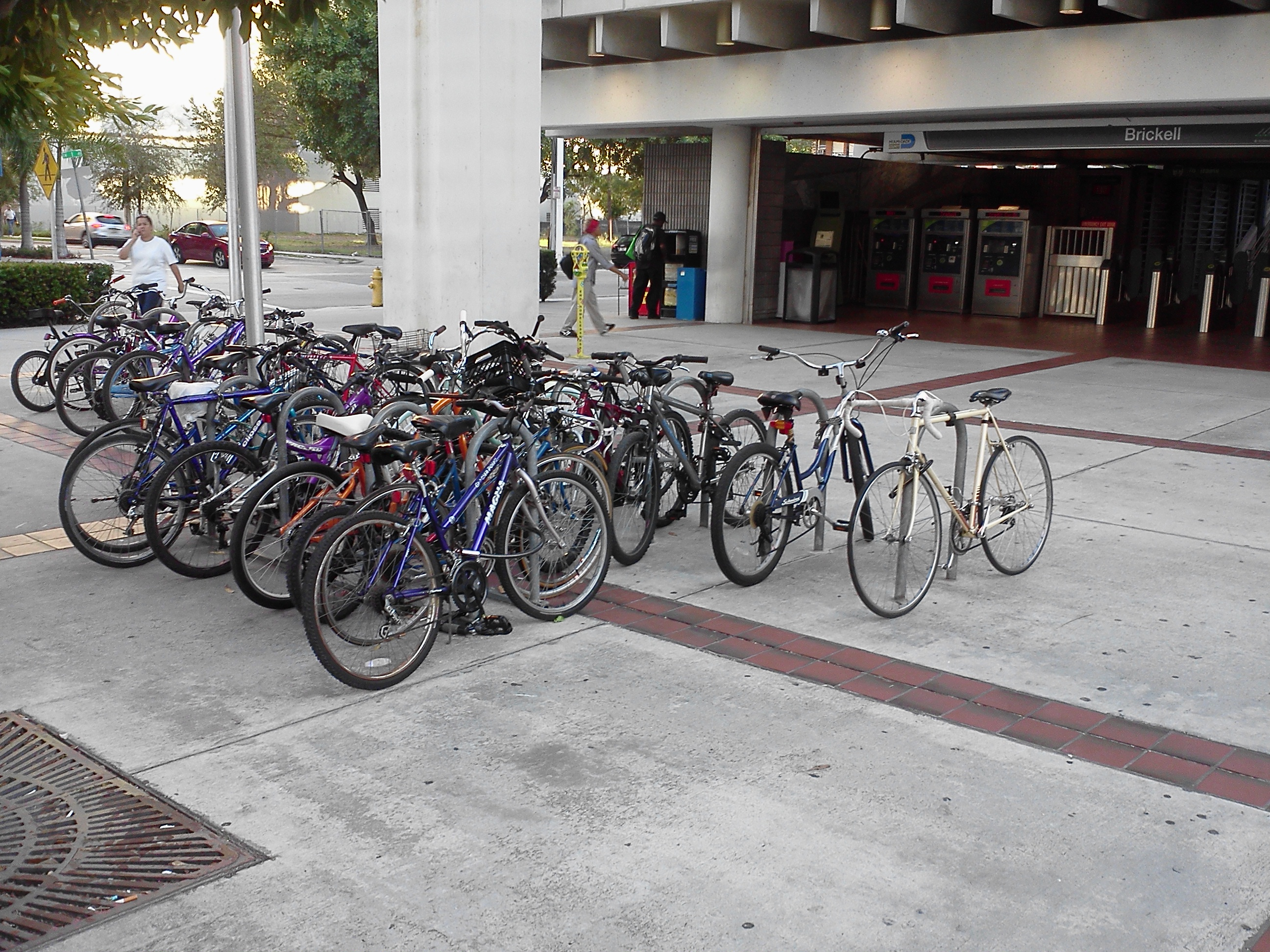
A busy bike and ride rack at the Brickell Metrorail station.

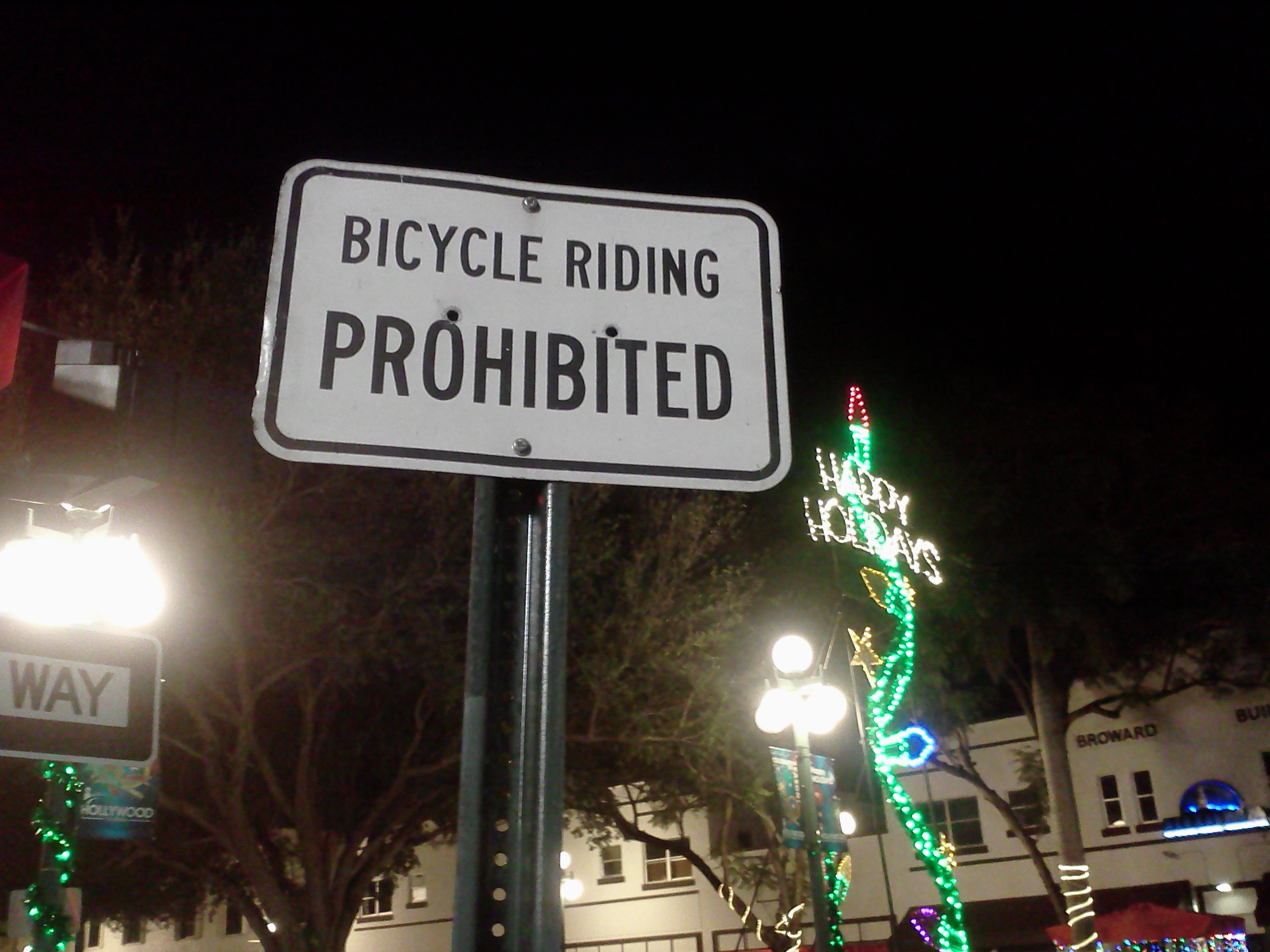
A sign on Hollywood Boulevard in 2011.

There are many popular bike routes in Miami-Dade County and South Florida. In the 2000s, the city government under Mayor Manny Diaz took an ambitious stance in support of bicycling in Miami for both recreational and commuting purposes. The city began to host a monthly event known as "Bike Miami", where major streets in Downtown and Brickell were closed to automobiles, and left open for pedestrians, bicyclists, and other human powered transportation. The event began in November 2008, and doubled in popularity from 1,500 participants to about 3,000 in the October 2009 Bike Miami. This event differed from Critical Mass as streets were officially closed by authorities. Now known as Critical Mass Miami, the event is held on the last Friday evening of every month. The event quickly grew in popularity, drawing thousands of cyclists including high-profile individuals such as Miami Heat stars LeBron James and Dwyane Wade. The event has caused some controversy over its loosely organized structure as well as rowdy crowds and unimpressed motorists. In October 2009, the city also approved an extensive 20-year plan for bike routes and paths around the city. The city has begun construction of bike routes as of late 2009, and under the new Miami 21 zoning laws ordinances requiring bike parking in all future construction in the city is now mandatory as of October 2009. In 2010, Miami was ranked number 44 most bike-friendly city in the U.S. according to Bicycling Magazine. Several large biking events are planned throughout South Florida for the fall 2011 season, including possible 100+ mile charity and timed runs.

In early 2012, a major gap in the MetroPath, which follows the Metrorail guideway from Brickell station to Dadeland South station, was completed with the addition of a bridge over the freeway entrance to the Snapper Creek Expressway from US 1, where traffic never has to stop. From the bridge, a 1.2 mi (2 km) extension to Dadeland South was completed, connecting the now 11 mi (18 km) path with the 20 mi (32 km) South Dade Rail Trail, which follows the South Dade Transitway continuously all the way to Florida City. This created a 31 mi (50 km) off-road bicycle and pedestrian corridor. The MetroPath is currently being replaced by a new linear park dubbed The Underline, which is expected to be completed in 2026, which would also eventually connect with the Ludlam Trail.

In the 21st century, bicycling has grown in popular in Miami Beach as well. Due to its dense, urban nature, and pedestrian-friendly streets, many Miami Beach residents get around by bicycle. Locally, South Beach has implemented many BikeShare units all around the neighborhood in a system known as DecoBike, which launched in March 2011. The initial rollout of the program included "approximately 100 solar-powered stations and 1,000 custom-designed bikes available to residents and visitors." This public bicycle sharing and rental program is owned and operated by DecoBike, LLC, a Miami-based company, and operates under a long-term agreement with the City of Miami Beach. The service is available to both residents and visitors – any adult with a major credit card can check out a bike to pedal to their next location. An iPhone app and an interactive map on the DecoBike website allows riders to locate the nearest "station" and gives riders the number of bikes available and the number of free docking spaces. In 2014, the bike-sharing system expanded to the downtown Miami area with a new branding under Citi Bike.

In early 2012, Miami Beach announced plans to build a 2,900 ft (884 m) elevated bicycle and pedestrian path from Belle Isle to the beach along the Collins Creek seawall on the south side of Dade Boulevard. The plan was approved and was initially set to be finished in July 2012; however, after procurement issues the project was not started until that year and, after intermittent construction, it has been given a completion date of 2015.

== Walkability ==
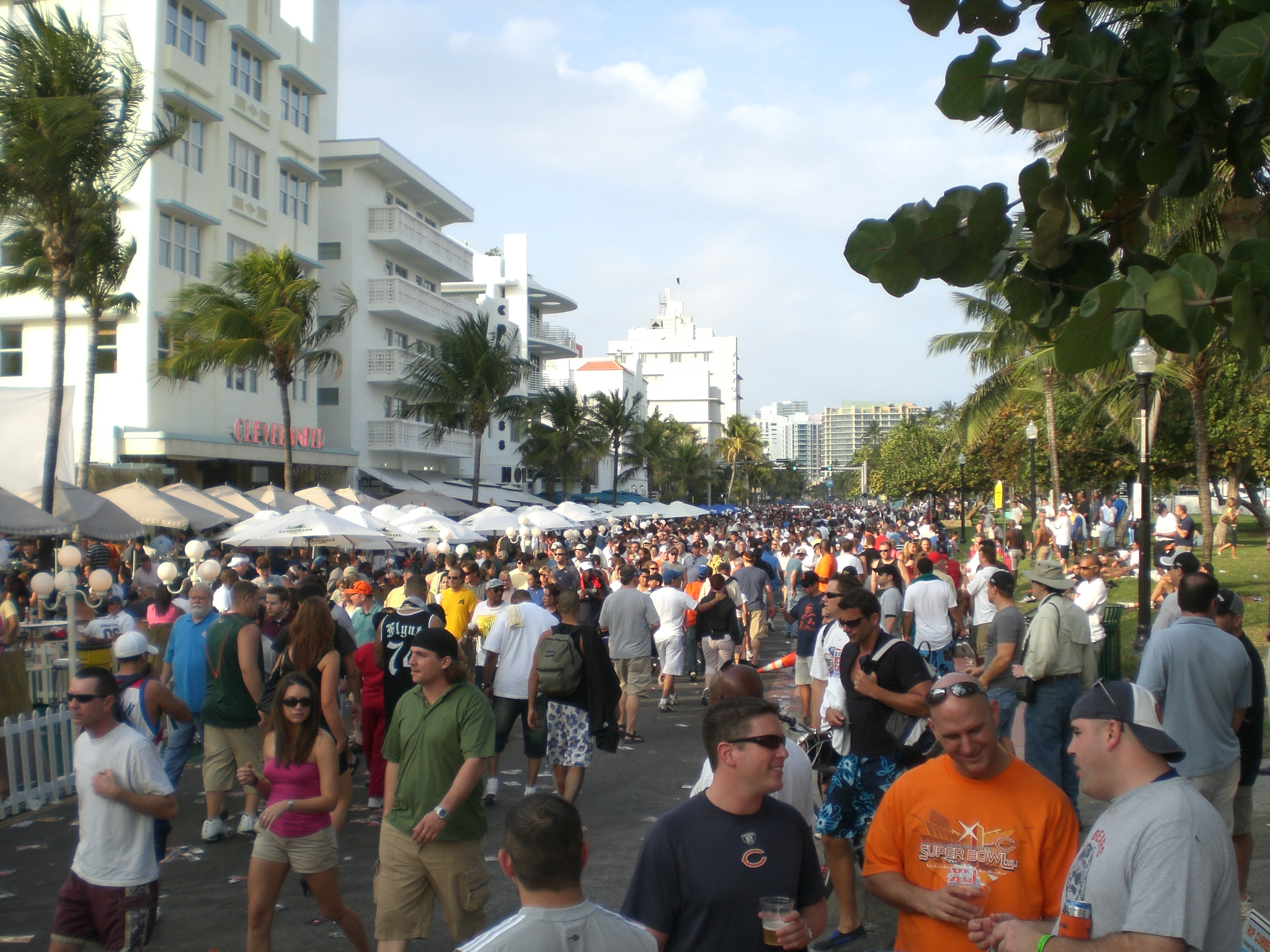
Ocean Drive in South Beach during an event.

A 2011 survey of the largest cities in the United States by walkscore.com determined the city of Miami to be ranked eighth in terms of walkability, with an overall walkscore of 73, though Miami provides a case study for the well-known fallibility of WalkScore for not accounting for safety and other factors. The ranking is based on proximity of restaurants, food, transit stops, and entertainment, among other things. Despite this, Miami, along with many younger, auto-dependent southern and western (Sunbelt) cities, is consistently ranked as one of the most dangerous cities in the US for pedestrians due to rude drivers, very wide roads, and the number of hit and runs; Miami-Dade County was found to have the highest number of pedestrian strikes in a 2013 study. Often several cars will hit a pedestrian and drive away. Sometimes people are even killed while waiting in bus stops when cars run off the road and destroy them. In 2002, pedestrians in Tampa-Orlando and Miami-Fort Lauderdale were found to be three times more likely to die than pedestrians in Cincinnati, Cleveland, and Columbus, Ohio. In 2011, all four of the most dangerous metropolitan areas or pedestrians in the United States were in Florida, with Miami-Fort Lauderdale coming in fourth, having a Pedestrian Danger Index five times greater than the New York City metropolitan area based on 2008–2012 data. Additionally, many motorists are acquitted or receive minor punishments for crimes such as DUI vehicular manslaughter and other reckless driving incidents.

In 2009, the city commission approved the new Miami 21 zoning policy that was considered a landmark example of New Urbanism, winning then-Mayor Miami Diaz the 2009 American Architectural Foundation's Keystone Award for taking on Miami 21. As the population grows in the region, especially in the greater downtown Miami area, graded and textured crosswalks are added to slow traffic along busy streets such as Brickell Avenue and Biscayne Boulevard (US 1). New crosswalks installed in the Upper Eastside along Biscayne Boulevard in late 2011 will also be outlined with flashing lights, as well as having islands in the center of the road and large speed feedback signs to warn automotive traffic. Plans have been floated to close the already walkable Flagler Street in Downtown Miami to traffic altogether or for festivals.

South Beach, with its crowded nature and night life, is a very popular walking area, as parking is limited and expensive. It is also known for its upscale Lincoln Road walking mall. Once drivable, Lincoln Road has been converted into a strict pedestrian road. Also popular for walking in South Beach are the Ocean Drive art deco historic district and Española Way. Additionally, much of the oceanfront along the east coast features pedestrian and bicycle only beach walks, which are often lit and lined with shops and restaurants. In 2014 it was proposed that Ocean Drive should be closed to automobile traffic to become another pedestrian road. The recently renovated 2.5 miles (4 km) Hollywood Beach Broadwalk in Hollywood was once named one of America's best boardwalks by Travel + Leisure magazine.

== Transit-oriented development (TOD) ==
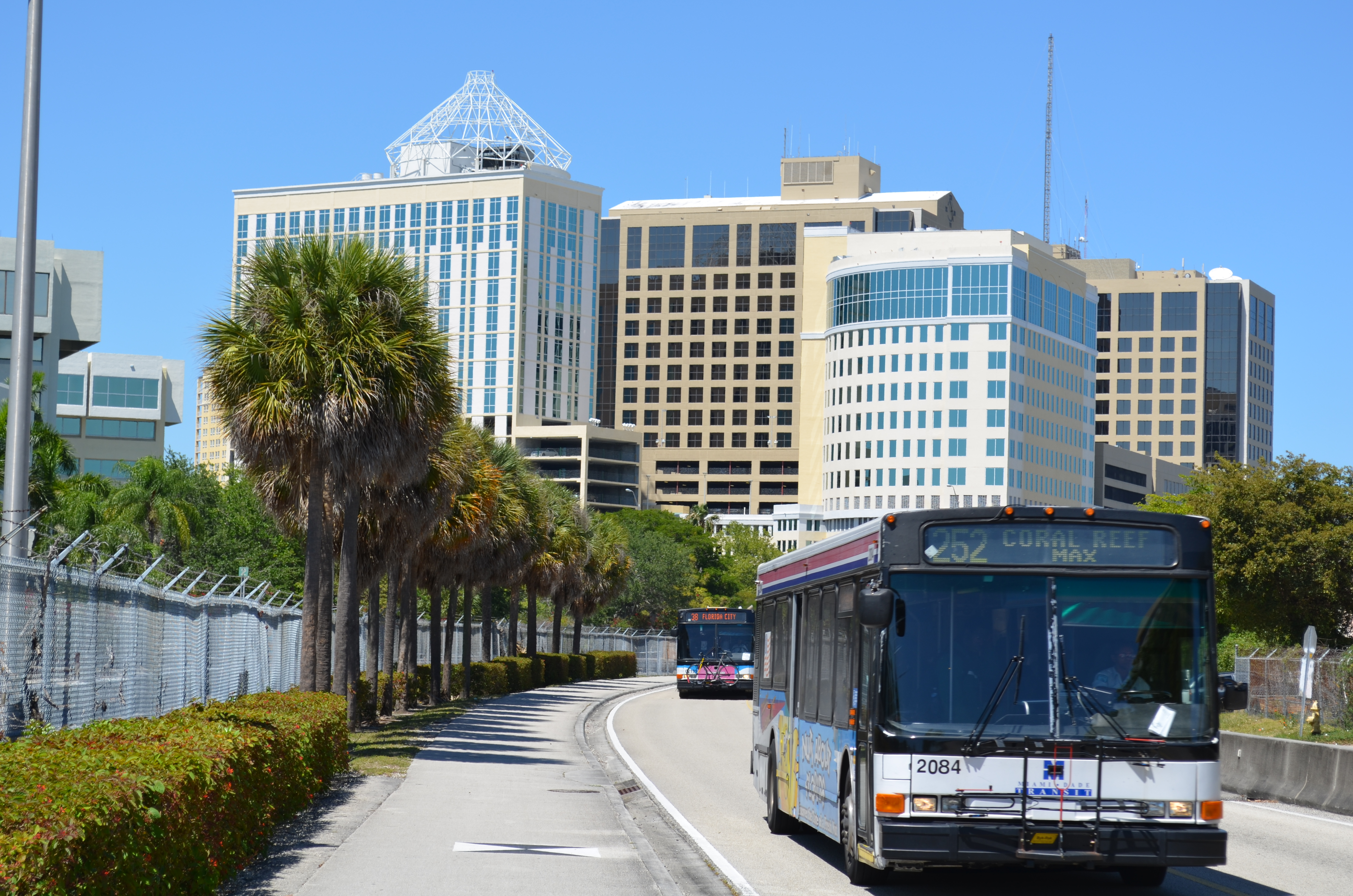
Though not incorporated, Dadeland has taken on the characteristics of an edge city, located about 10 miles (16 km) outside of downtown Miami. It is located at the southern terminus of the Metrorail where it meets the northern terminus of the South Dade Transitway.

More priority has recently been given to transit-oriented development, with several housing and mixed-use projects being given special incentives and reduced parking requirements for building along transit lines. Examples include MDT's "transit villages". Two recently built transit-oriented developments are located at Brownsville and Santa Clara, the two least used stations in the system.

The still-under development Brownsville Transit Village will have 467 affordable housing units and ground level retail between five midrises on a 5.8-acre plot located immediately next to Brownsville station, which is currently the second least used Metrorail stations, average under 900 riders per weekday as of February 2011. Santa Clara Apartments I and II were opened in 2011 and are located at Santa Clara, the least used station, averaging under 800 riders per day as of February 2011. In February 2014, ridership at these stations had increased by over 20%.

In 2015, plans for a Miami MLS stadium as well as a possible joint University of Miami football stadium cited as a necessity to be in or near Miami's urban core with a transit-oriented location.. The answer to this search became the now-closed Melreese Golf Course in Grapeland Heights.

The Miami Intermodal Center is located near Nu Stadium at Miami Freedom Park, the soccer stadium and retail complex opening in 2026 built on the former Melreese site. The Intermodal Center is located on the north side of the canal that separates the stadium site from the airport.

A 1,450-foot, grade-separated pedestrian bridge linking the transit hub with Miami Freedom Park will begin construction in 2027 and be completed by the second quarter of 2029.

Historically, several buildings were built in conjunction with the MetroMover and Metrorail systems in the 1980s. Both systems connect on the north side of Stephen P. Clark Government Center. The Knight Center Metromover station is built into the Miami Tower (formerly Bank of America Building); it is connected via pedestrian tunnel to the James L Knight Center under Downtown Distributor overpasses. Another private development, the ambitious Omni International Mall, colloquially known as the Omni, is connected to the Adrienne Arsht Center station (formerly Omni station), by a pedestrian bridge that was closed when the majority of the mall closed. Outside of the downtown area, the highly dense suburb of unincorporated Kendall in South Dade has been built up significantly around the busy Metrorail stations of Dadeland North and Dadeland South, both of which opened in 1984, in an area known as Dadeland. This area is an officially recognized transit-oriented development by the Federal Transit Administration (FTA)-sponsored Transit Cooperative Research Program (TCRP). Both stations consistently have over 6,000 weekday passengers as of the mid 2010s, and they form the southern terminus of the current Metrorail line.

The downtown core and Brickell neighborhoods, with their dense zoning allowances, have incidentally taken on characteristics of transit-oriented neighborhoods. However, ridership increases were generally less than what is found in areas of other cities with similar densities, according to a Transportation Cooperative Research Program study from 2004 regarding transit-oriented development. One reason given was a lack of pedistrian-friendly urban fabric, such as safe street crossings and retail at transit stations, a phenomenon known as "transit-adjacent development". However, from 2004 to 2014, along with two real estate booms, ridership roughly doubled for both the Metrorail and Metromover components of Brickell station.

=== Metromover ===
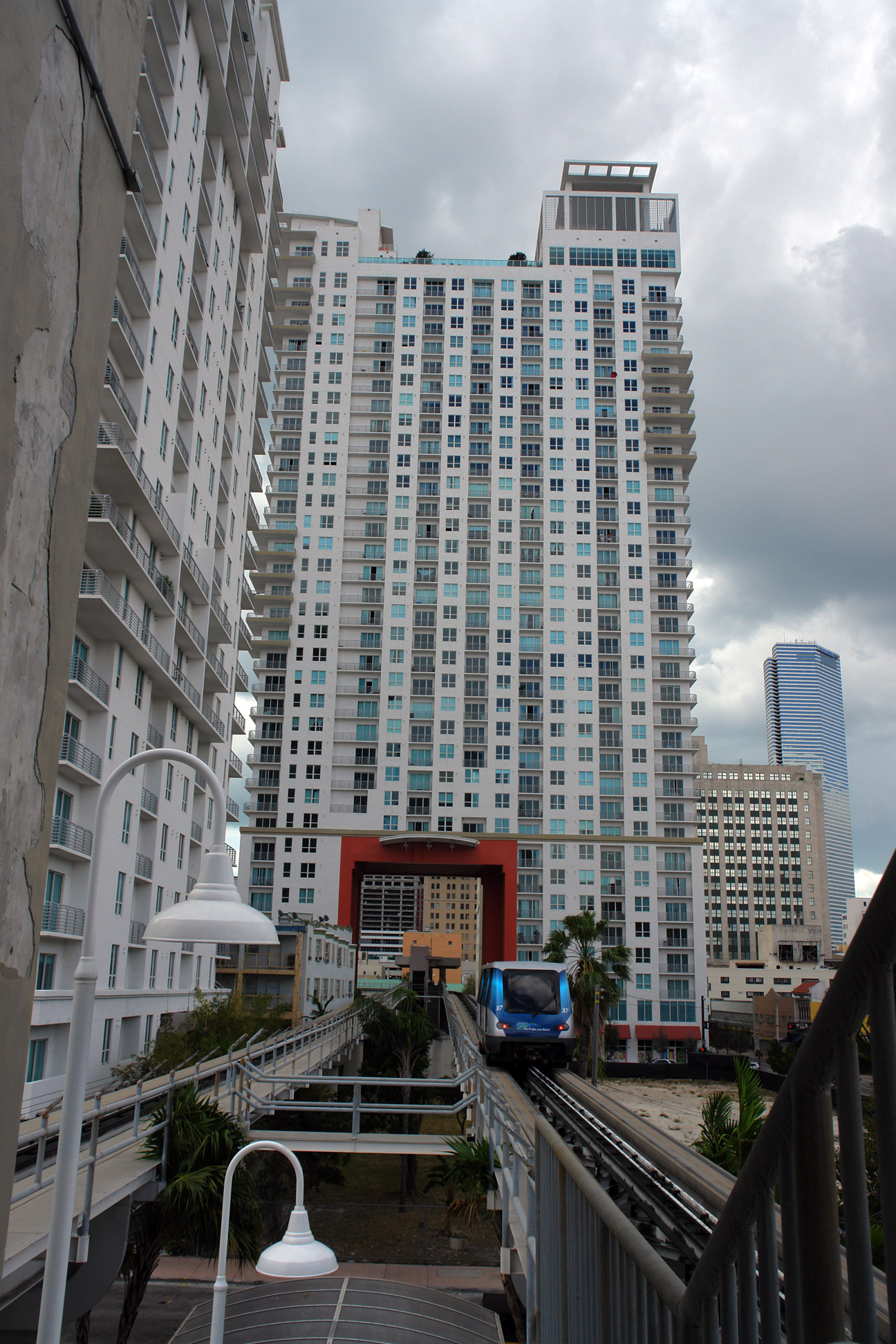
The Loft 2 condominium was allowed an exemption to parking requirements due to transit access.

During the large condominium real estate boom of the 2000s, nearly 50 new condominium buildings were constructed in the greater downtown area, which along with fare elimination, correlated with a doubling in Metromover ridership throughout the decade. The mid 2010s is seeing another large development boom As of 2015. Two very large projects are incorporating Metromover stations for direct access. Brickell City Centre closed the Eighth Street Station in 2014 to renovate and incorporate it into their project; Miami Worldcenter may incorporate both the Freedom Tower and Park West stations, in addition to a possible connection to the Virgin MiamiCentral station. This dense downtown development cannot be considered exclusive transit-oriented development, however, as many locations throughout the region have many high-rise and other large buildings without permanent transit infrastructure. It is more a reflection of zoning allowance; the current Miami 21 zoning code in the city of Miami lends itself to larger development, with densities up to 1,000 units per acre, and taller buildings downtown or in transit corridors, though it also sets strict and controversial parking space minimums. In addition, public transit is not considered a priority to the many high-income condo buyers, who often seek ample parking; despite this, proximity to transit if often included in the marketing of these towers. In contrast to traditional transit-oriented development, much of the real estate is a far cry from affordable housing geared toward lower and middle income residents. Real estate developers are generally required to pay high impact fees for these large buildings, the profits of which are intended to go to public infrastructure such as schools and transportation. The City of Miami impact fees ordinance was amended in 2005 due to the high amount of development at that time.

On the other hand, the "Downtown Kendall Urban Center District ordinance" from 1998 that allowed the area of unincorporated Kendall known as Dadeland to grow into a de facto edge city was in part due to its location adjacent to the inter-built Dadeland South Metrorail station and Datran Center. The Datran Center was built as a joint development between its private developer and Miami-Dade Transit. The Loft/The Loft 2 and Centro Lofts are two relatively large buildings that were allowed exemptions to parking requirements due to copious transit access. The Loft 2 is built directly over the First Street Metromover station while Centro Lofts is surrounded by the Metromover's downtown loop in addition to having an arrangement with the local Car2Go service. Due to the urban density, high-rises, cultural institutions, and access to various transit services, Downtown and Brickell are often compared to New York City, specifically Manhattan, despite being much smaller.

== Future proposals and extensions ==
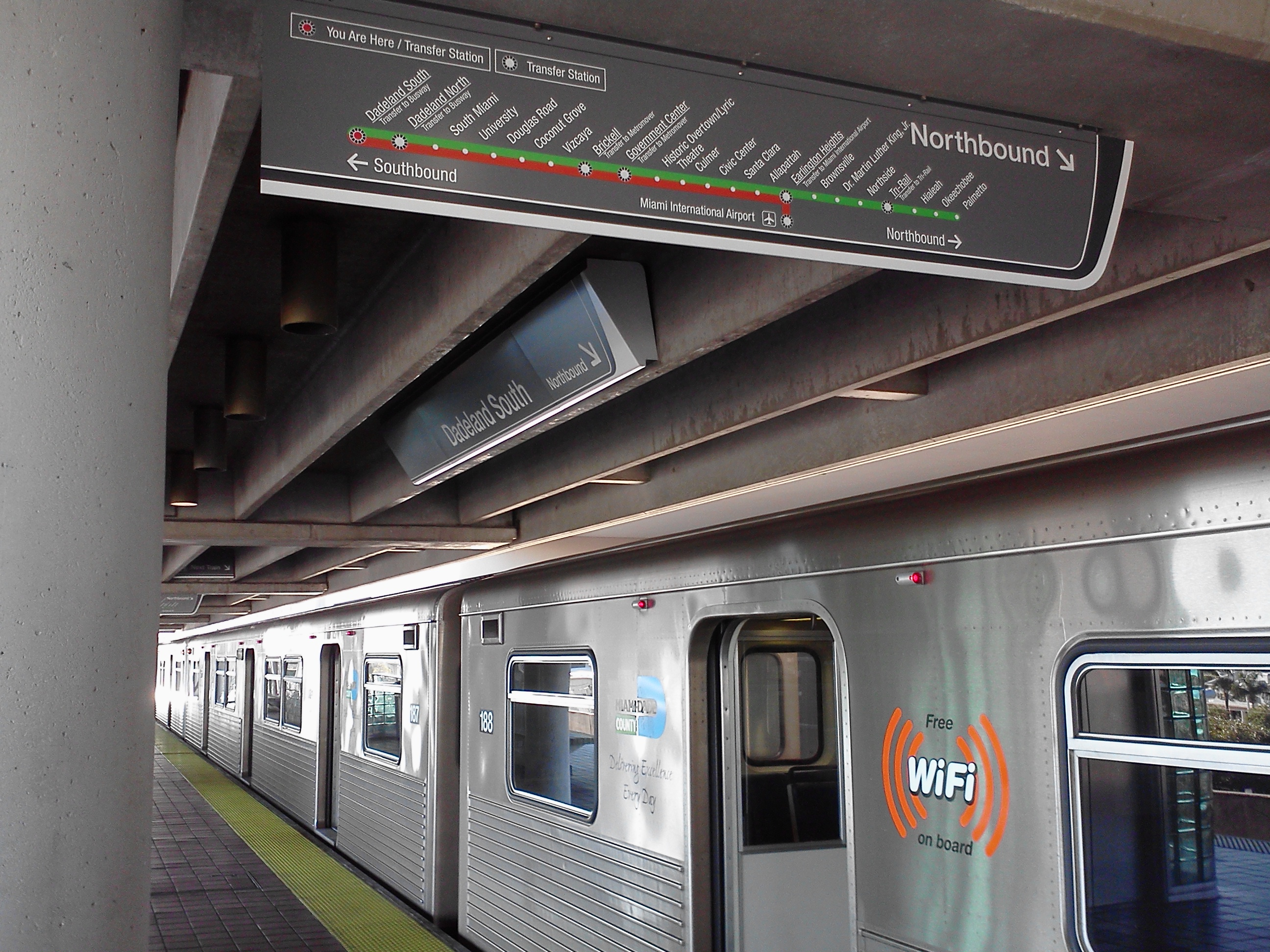
New system maps showing the Orange Line, which opened in 2012.

Many transportation systems, including highways, have been proposed, especially in Miami-Dade County, which were subsequently cancelled, often due to financial issues. During the 1970s, the time when the "Decade of Progress" local bond was approved, residents of the Miami-Dade County voted 2-to-1 for a transportation plan that cancelled highways in favor of public transit planning and funding. Heavy rail (Metrorail) expansion is estimated to have a construction cost of about $100–200 million per mile. Planned toll roads and express lane expansions, together with highway widening, continued greatly from the late 2010s into at least the early 2020s.

=== MDT Orange Line (Metrorail) ===
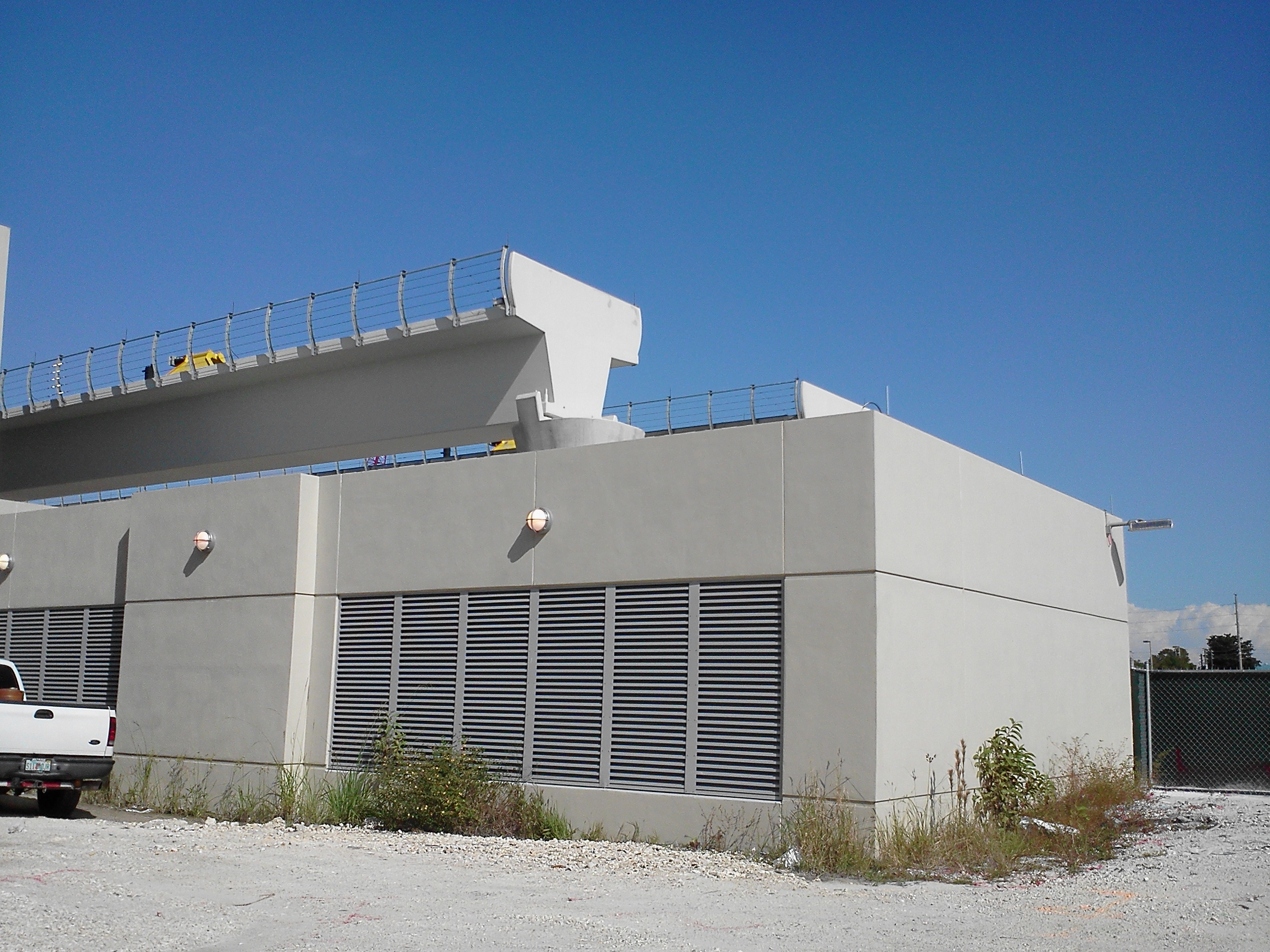
End of the elevated Metrorail track at Miami Intermodal Center

The Orange Line was a major proposal for three new Metrorail lines. One north to the Broward–Miami-Dade county line via 27th Ave, an east–west extension to Florida International University, and a link to Miami International Airport. Only one has been built, the short connector to the airport from the Earlington Heights station, known as the AirportLink, which was completed in 2012. The other two have been permanently cancelled, primarily due to political corruption, namely the misuse of the half-penny tax passed in 2002 and false ridership and revenue forecasts by MDT.

Although the only physical Metrorail addition forming the Orange Line is the single station 2.4-mile spur to the airport, the entire line from the airport to Dadeland South has been rebranded as the Orange Line, in addition to being the Green Line. This is because trains that will run to the airport will go all the way to Dadeland South, along with Green Line trains.

=== FEC Tri-Rail alignment "Coastal Link" ===
The "Coastal Link" is a long-proposed project to move or expand Tri-Rail service to the more easterly aligned Florida East Coast Railway freight line. This would bring it closer to people and boost its ridership to up to 59,000 passengers a day, according to a three-year study by the Florida Department of Transportation, as well as bring it straight into Downtown Miami, terminating near the Government Center transit hub. Additionally, service could be extended northward to Jupiter, located in the extreme northeast corner of Palm Beach County. The east–west crossover between the lines would allow both to go to Miami International Airport or downtown Miami, and a second spur to the port, which already exists, might also be used for Tri-Rail service. The FEC line would have to be vastly upgraded to make this move possible, as much of it was only a single line at this time, where Tri-Rail requires two. Additionally, all new stations would have to be built. It is uncertain whether or not Tri-Rail would continue to operate its current line at the same time. The expansion proposal by Tri-Rail's current operator, the SFRTA, would have trains running on both lines, while the other proposal by the Florida Department of Transportation might only operate on the FEC line. The state is looking to possibly privatize operations of Tri-Rail, with the FECR likely to operate any future passenger rail on its line, while the current line may be operated by other private entities. An east–west connection between the lines would give South Florida a much more complete commuter rail system. Much of the FEC line was single tracked, and would need to be at least double tracked to handle freight, passenger, and possible Amtrak service. For this reason, many of the preliminary plans called for the project to be cut into phases, such as an initial improvement of the line between Miami and Fort Lauderdale. Pending local and state funding, as well as a possible Federal Railroad Administration grant, service was anticipated to begin on at least part of the FEC line as early as 2015. On October 28, 2011, the SFRTA Governing Board approved a plan to run Tri-Rail local and express service on the FEC line to Downtown Miami by 2015. The plan then went to the tri-county Metropolitan Planning Organization (MPO)'s boards for approval. The plan was being fast-tracked in phases to provide service on the FEC portion from Downtown Fort Lauderdale and Downtown Miami's Government Center Station as soon as 2014. These plans largely stagnated due to lack of funding and uncertainty in dealing with Florida East Coast Railway.

Plans for a Tri-Rail "Coastal Link" resurfaced with the construction of FEC's Brightline (now Virgin Trains USA) intercity higher-speed rail system in 2014. One plan for early action called for the possibility of rerouting trains on the CSX line over a spur in northern Miami-Dade County to the FEC line where trains would run from the Midtown area to the lines termination at Virgin MiamiCentral station in downtown Miami. Another plan calls for an initial six stations between downtown Miami and Aventura. Although the All Aboard Florida project includes double tracking the entire line in South Florida, the Coastal Link would require the construction of its own stations between All Aboard Florida's three stations, as well as the possible addition of a third track, at a cost estimated between US$720 and US$800 million in 2014.

=== BayLink ===
BayLink is a long proposed streetcar, light rail, or Metrorail extension that would connect Downtown Miami to South Beach via the MacArthur Causeway, with the light rail or streetcar options potentially having loops at both ends. Originally proposed as a light rail line such as a monorail, Miami Beach city officials opposed this in favor of something less intrusive, such as a streetcar. They also cited concerns of unwanted downtown residents detrimenting the South Beach image. Additionally, the unused parts of the bases of the MacArthur Causeway bridge pilings that were to be used to support the line have been used for the widening of the causeway for the construction of the Port Miami Tunnel. Officials still thought it was feasible, as a light rail streetcar, and in 2014 were considering the possibility of a public-private partnership to help fund it.

=== 2016: SMART plan ===
In 2016, a new plan was introduced, known as the Strategic Miami Area Rapid Transit (SMART) expansion plan. It outlined six corridors in need of premium transit lines, NW 27th Avenue North Corridor, FEC line Coastal Link, an east–west line likely following the Dolphin Expressway, South Dade Transitway conversion, Kendall Corridor down Kendall Drive (SW 88 Street), and BayLink (Beach Corridor). The Beach Corridor line might also connect Midtown and downtown Miami. The lines would most likely use at-grade heavy rail at best, but may be bus-rapid transit, light rail, or Metromover in the case of BayLink. The price would likely be at least $70 billion for all 70 miles (110 km). In early 2017, funding for studies was moved forward, with some controversy.

In 2025, the first line built under the SMART plan, the South Dade Transitway, opened to the public.

=== Downtown streetcars ===
Several street cars, jitneys, and other local bus routes have been proposed in Miami for the Downtown/Brickell/CBD/Arts & Entertainment District area. A notable example is a proposed streetcar line down Biscayne Boulevard from Downtown to the Arts & Entertainment District. Miami had streetcars since 1906. By the 1920s, downtown had an extensive streetcar system, including an express line from Miami to Coral Gables that exceeded 70 miles per hour (113 km/h). However, the 1926 Miami Hurricane damaged the system and as time passed they were all removed.

Fort Lauderdale had plans in 2011 for a 2.7 mi (4 km) downtown light rail streetcar system to be called The Wave Streetcar. After delays the project received final approval in 2013 and, funded with the help of federal subsidies, construction was to begin in 2014. The project then met further difficulties including risk of losing the federal money, and construction was pushed back to 2017–2020. The project was cancelled in 2018.

=== Transit to PortMiami ===
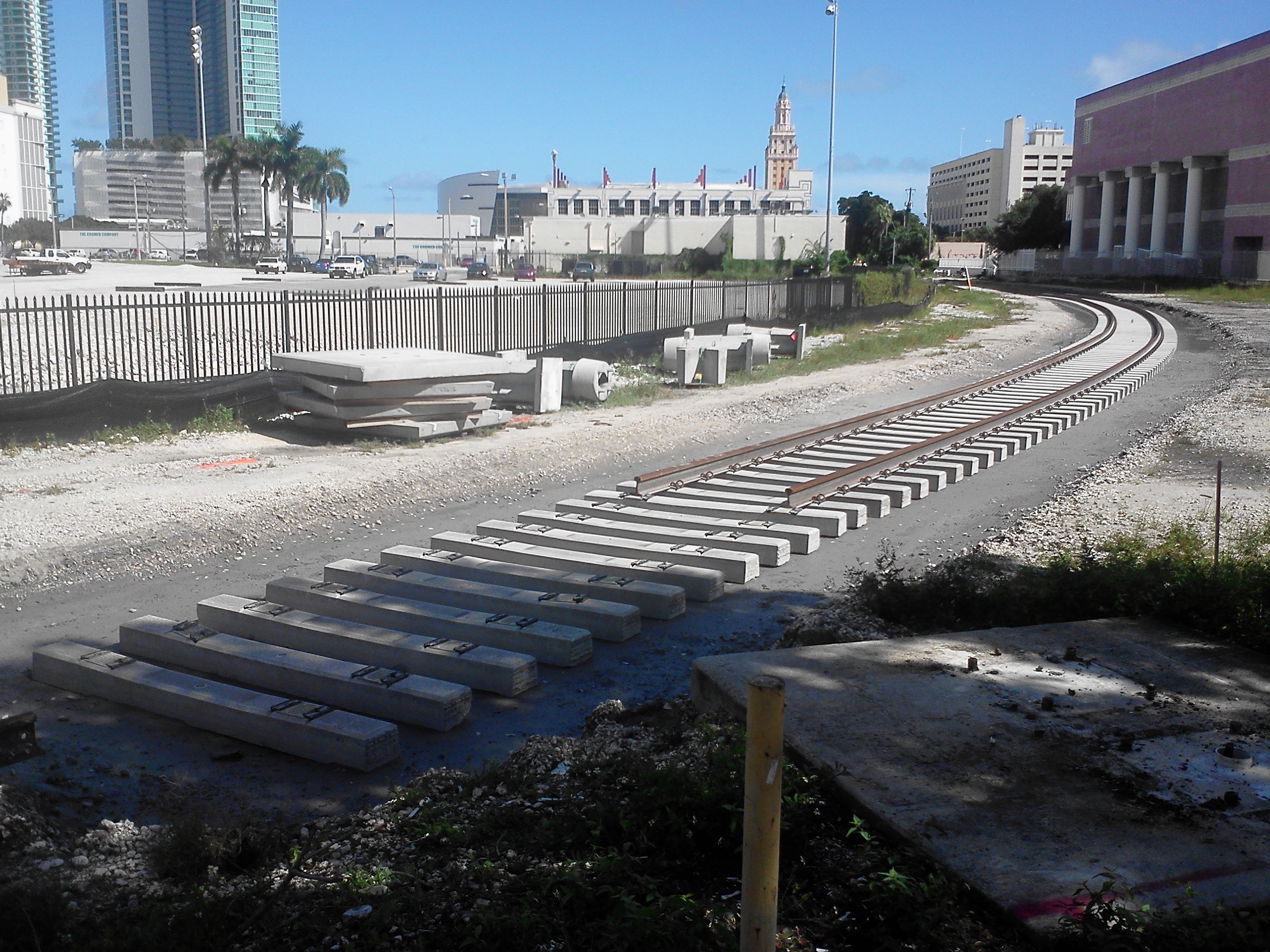
The southern end of the FEC rail line was renovated in 2011 for freight service to return to the seaport.

In mid-2011, a US$120,000 study was proposed to analyze the feasibility and impact of building a Metromover extension to the PortMiami. This would create a somewhat direct elevated transit link from Miami International Airport to the seaport, Miami-Dade County's two largest economic generators. Multiple transfers would be required, however, as a trip from the airport to the seaport would start with the MIA Mover, then Metrorail's AirportLink, then the Metromover port line. In 2014, A Metromover connection to the port was still being considered and was included in the "Metromover Expansion Master Plan".

The FEC freight railroad spur to PortMiami was renovated and returned to service in the early 2010s. In addition, the construction that began on stations and double tracking of the mainline in South Florida as part of the Brightline (now Virgin Trains USA) intercity rail system could potentially foster in future heavy rail passenger service to the port.

Various enhanced connections to Port Everglades have also been proposed over the years, including the long-term plan for the Wave Streetcar. In the 2000s and 2010s, road access to the port via I-595 was improved.

=== Dolphin Expressway extension - Krome Avenue widening ===
There is a controversial plan to extend the Dolphin Expressway from its current western terminus further west to the edge of the Everglades, then south through rural areas, with Krome Avenue being the primary alignment proposed. Controversy surrounds whether such an alignment, located outside of the Urban Development Boundary and near a fragile ecosystem, would encourage more sprawl and suburban development in an already congested region. Known as the "southwest extension," it would carry the expressway south to Southwest 136 Street in Country Walk, adjacent to Kendall–Tamiami Executive Airport. The project drew mixed reaction from local residents in an informal public awareness meeting held by the Miami-Dade Expressway Authority in 2014. Beginning in 2015, a controversial widening of Krome Avenue began from Okeechobee to the Tamiami Trail, followed by the next segment from Tamiami to Kendall Drive. While not a limited-access highway, the project adds a median and brings the road to four lanes. Eventually the southern portion from Kendall Drive to the southern terminus at US-1 in Florida City, through more developed areas, is expected to be widened as well.

== Geography ==
Satellite view

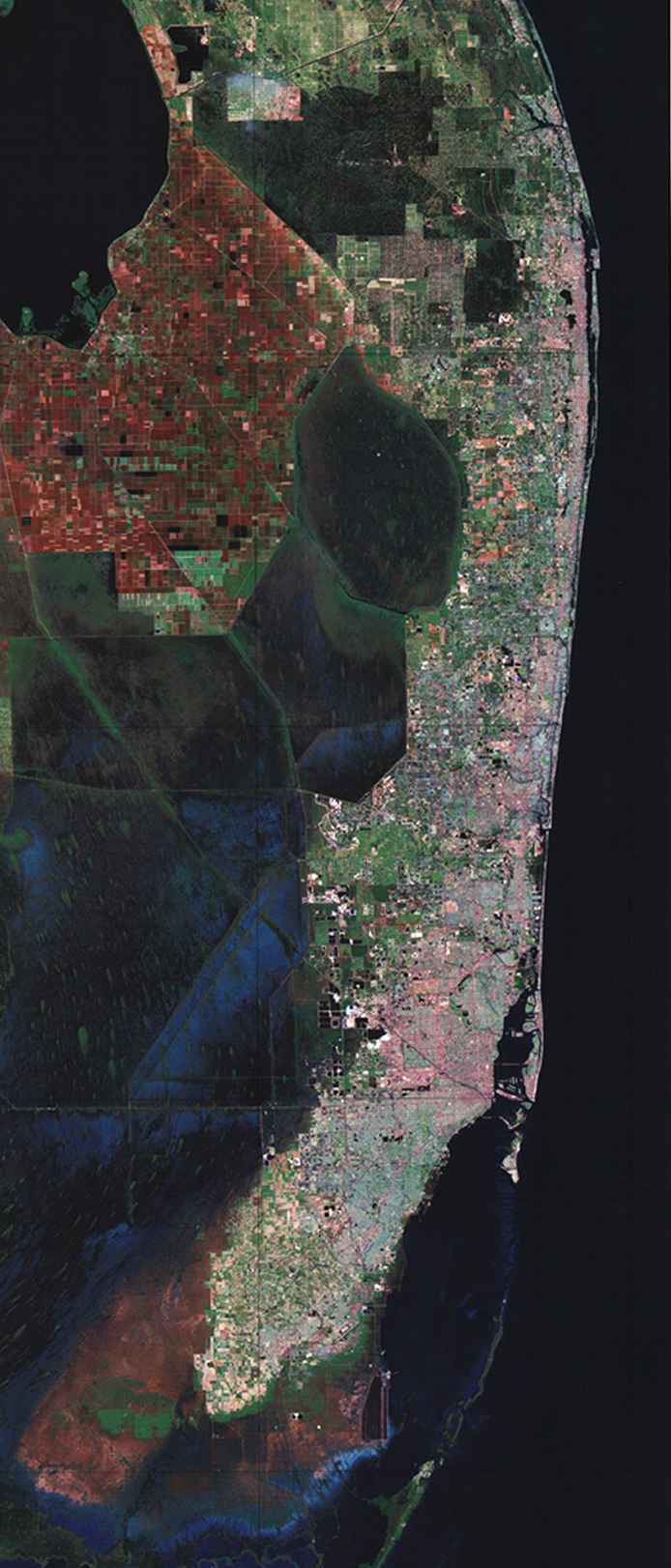
Miami metro area is much longer than it is wide

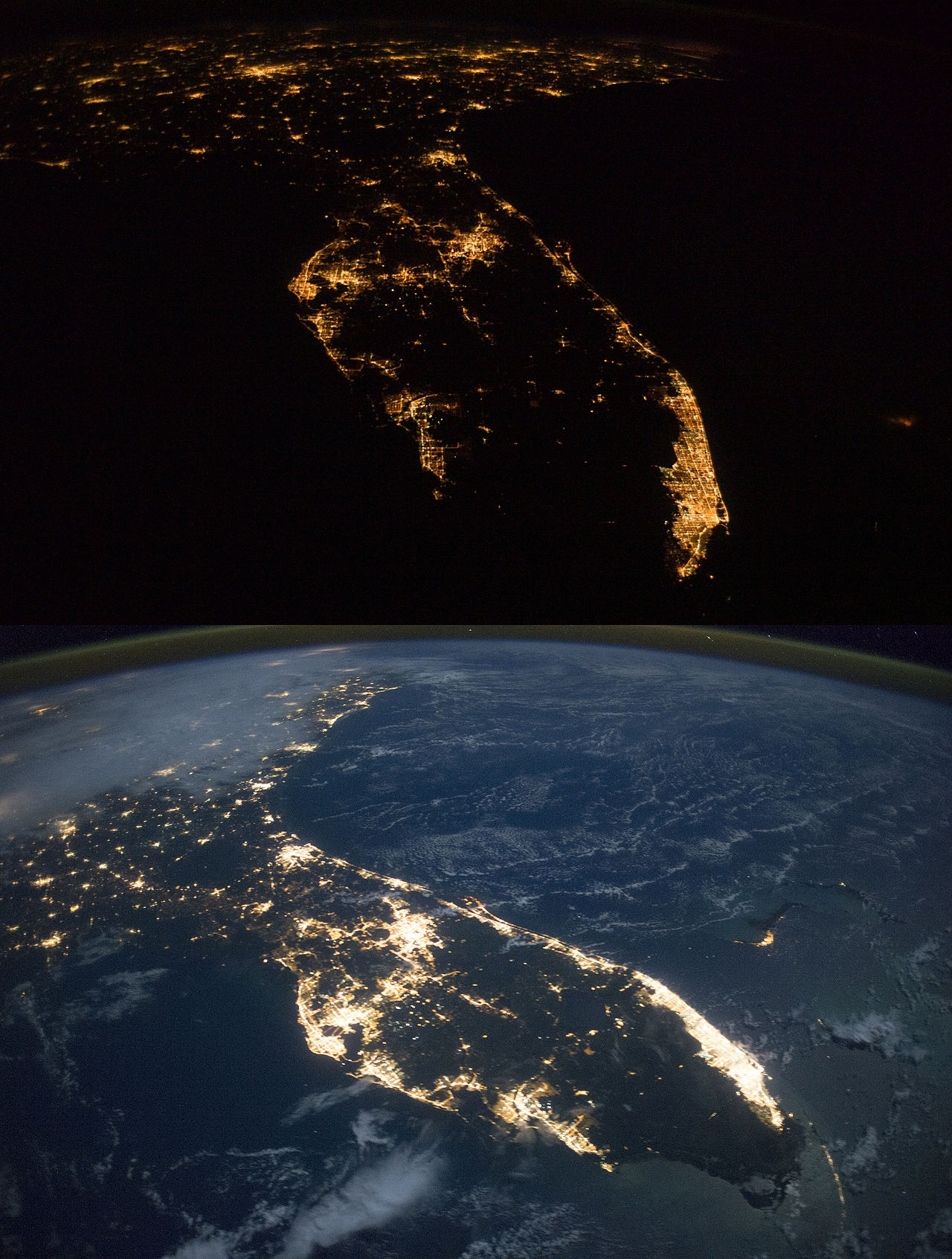
Nighttime satellite views of southeastern US with South Florida bottom right. Images taken in 2010 and 2014

Physical expansion of the urbanized area in southern Florida is constrained by its location between the Atlantic Ocean to the east and the federally protected Everglades wetlands to the west. Though there is more land that can legally be developed before cutting in to Everglades National Park, Miami-Dade County has a politically defined Urban Development Boundary (UDB), which is only amended to allow further development after due process, with considerations such as population growth and amount and location of undeveloped land available within the UDB. This trend lends itself to increasing density within the urbanized area, with a focus on areas with transit; however, most of the expansions of the UDB are for low-density residential developments of less than five units per acre. This contrasts sharply with the downtown Miami area, where zoning allows development up to 1,000 units per acre, and zoning allowances are amended as the downtown area expands.

Hurricanes pose a substantial threat to infrastructure along the entire east coast of the United States, with Miami being ranked one of the most threatened major cities in terms of potential financial loss due to storms and climate change, along with New York City. Particularly, Miami is considered one of the most vulnerable cities worldwide in terms of possible sea level rise, with Miami Beach experiencing annual tidal flooding. The county claims that regular service on transportation systems will be suspended before sustained winds reach 39 miles per hour (63 km/h) in anticipation of tropical weather. Miami-Dade Transit will use its rolling stock as emergency vehicles to transport people to and from emergency shelters in the event of an evacuation order.

=== Sea level-related engineering ===
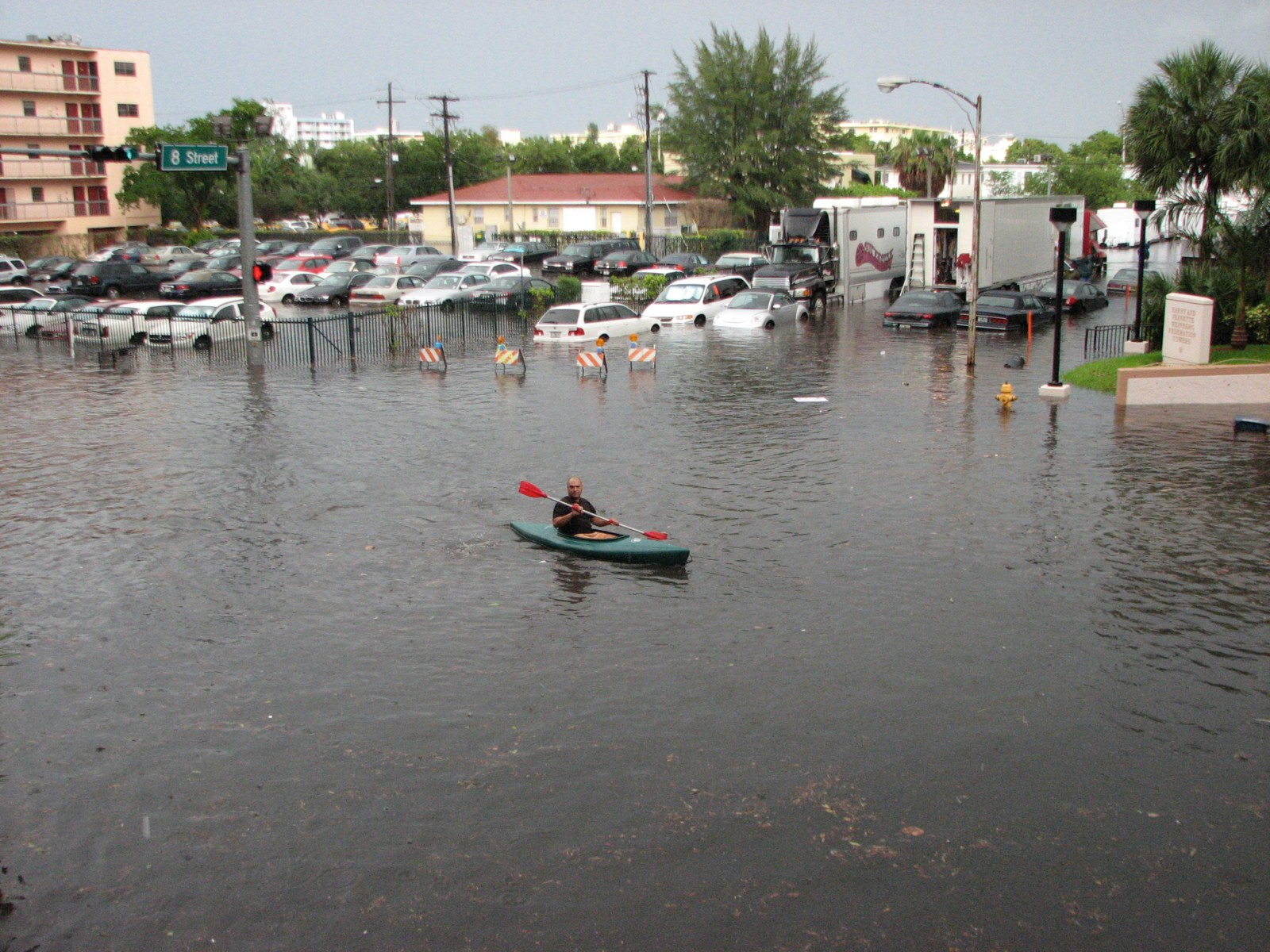
A primarily rain-driven flood in South Beach on June 5, 2009 in which up to 10 inches (250 mm) of very heavy rain fell just before an approximately 2.8-foot (0.85 m) MLLW tide, meaning the storm water could not drain effectively.

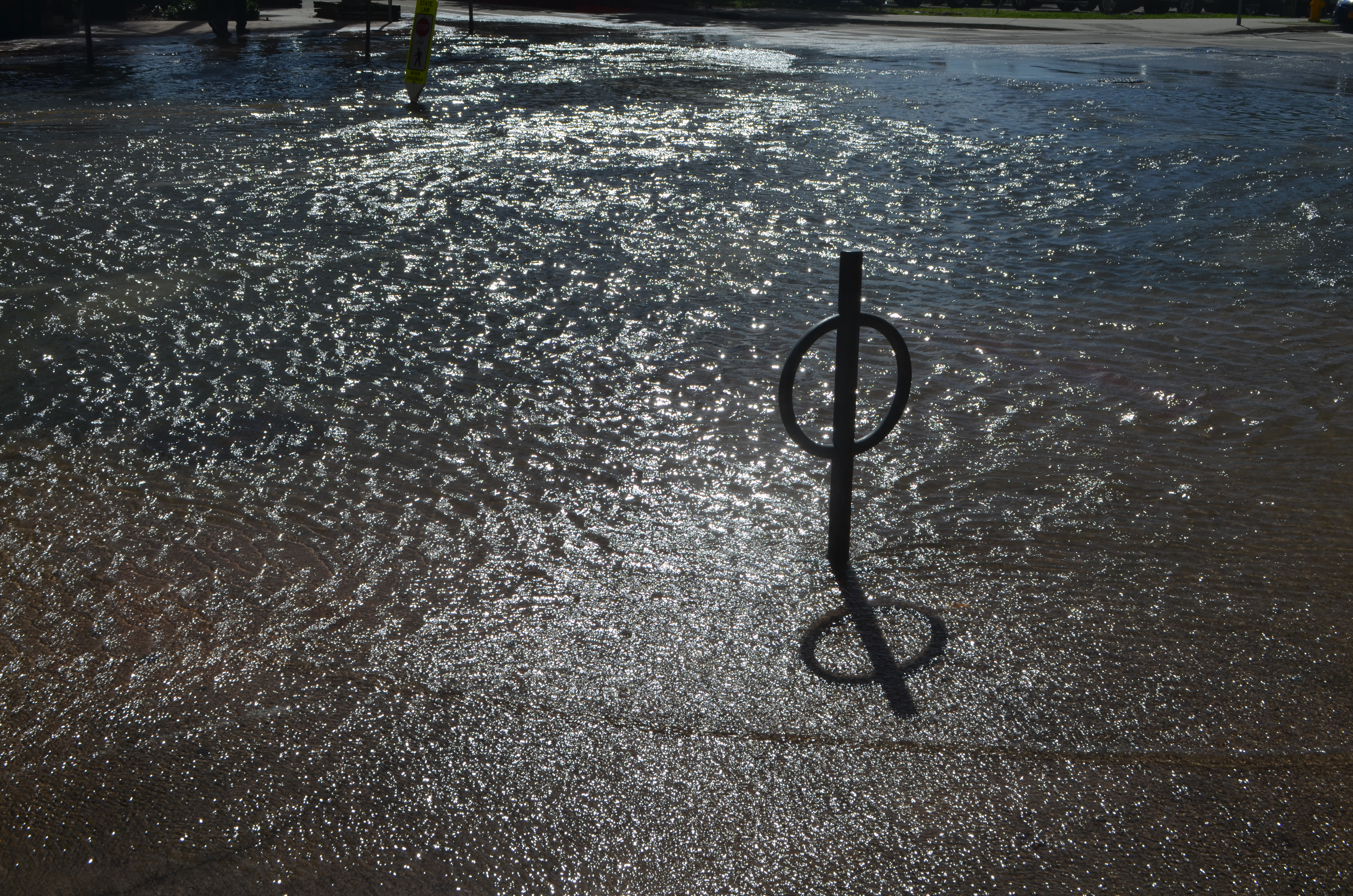
Brickell Bay Drive at a low intersection in Brickell, on the mainland on October 17, 2016.

In addition to present difficulty with below-grade development, some areas of southern Florida, especially Miami Beach, are beginning to engineer specifically for sea level rise and other potential effects of climate change. This includes a five-year, US$500 million project for the installation of 60 to 80 pumps, building of taller sea walls, and the physical raising or road tarmac levels, as well as possible zoning and building code changes, which could eventually lead to retrofitting of existing and historic properties. Miami Beach sees sunny day flooding of certain roads during the annual king tides, though some argue this has been the case for decades, as the parts of the western side of South Beach are at virtually 0 feet (0 m) above normal high tide, with the entire city averaging only 4.4 feet (1.3 m) above mean sea level (AMSL).

A study of Miami Beach's flooding incidents between 1998 and 2013 by the Rosenstiel School of Marine, Atmospheric, and Earth Science concluded that tidal flooding was increasing with an increase in the rate of sea level rise locally. The fall 2015 king tides exceeded expectations in longevity and height. Some streets and sidewalks were raised about 2.5 feet (0.76 m) over previous levels; the four initial pumps installed in 2014 are capable of pumping 4,000 US gallons per minute. Several other cities in the county already have building codes that exceed Federal Emergency Management Agency (FEMA) mandates. Traditional sea level rise and storm mitigation measures including sea walls and dykes, such as those in the Netherlands and New Orleans, will not work in South Florida due to the porous nature of the ground and limestone beneath the surface. More than half of South Florida is under 6 feet (1.8 m) AMSL, while the highest elevations, made up of a limestone ridge that includes Brickell Hammock, averages only 12 feet (3.7 m). Fort Lauderdale sees increasing tidal flooding as well, exacerbated by its extensive inland canal system. They are combating the problem with one-way valves retrofitted into the drainage system, and are considering using pumps as well. Development booms in the 21st century began raising questions of the sustainability of coastal habitation, given that South Florida's approximate population of six million makes up nearly half of the estimated 13.1 million people who would be affected by a 1.8 m (5.9 ft) increase in sea level possible by 2100.

== Politics ==
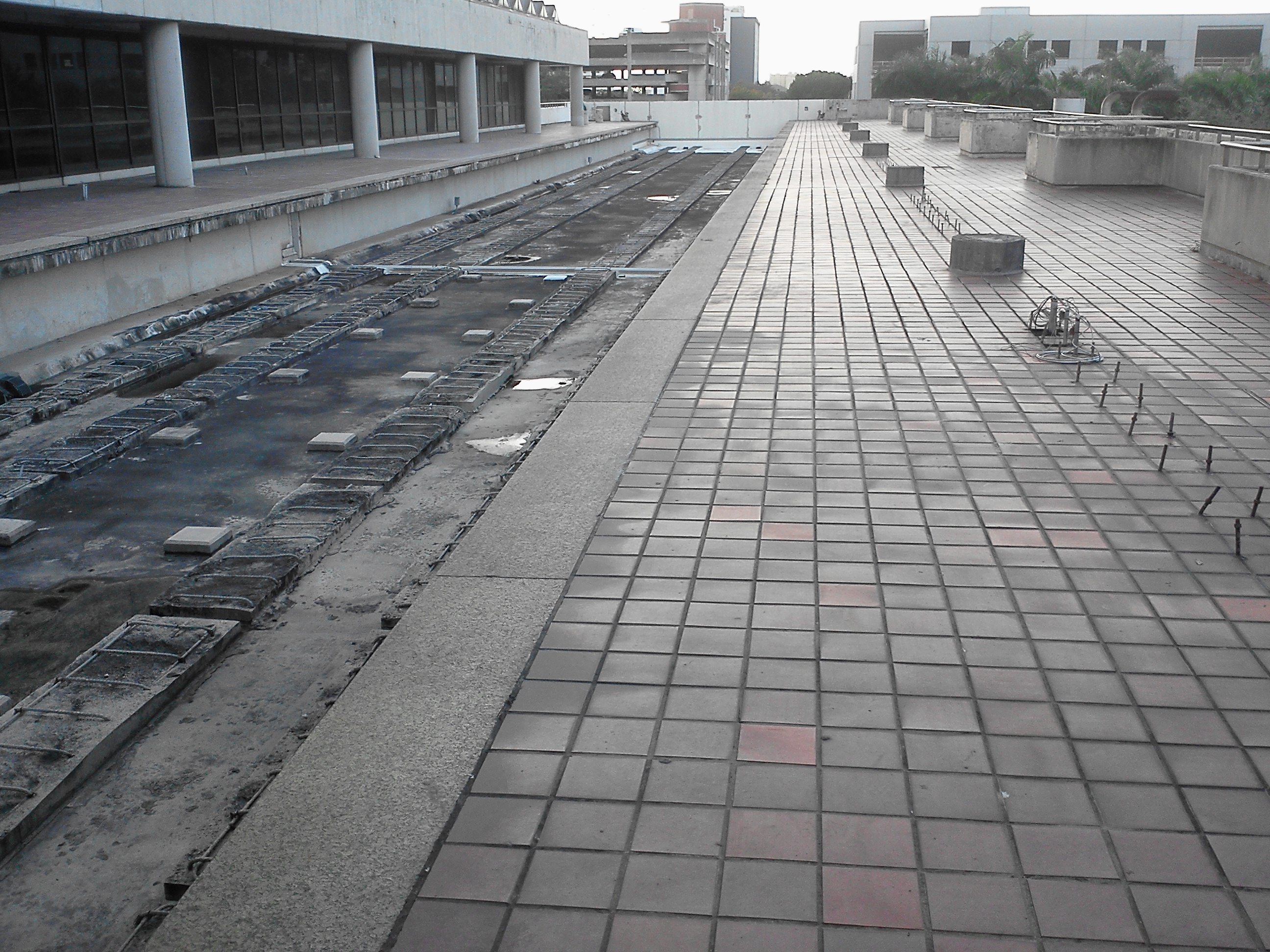
The unused east–west platform at Government Center station, built in 1984 with the existing Metrorail system, but never completed.

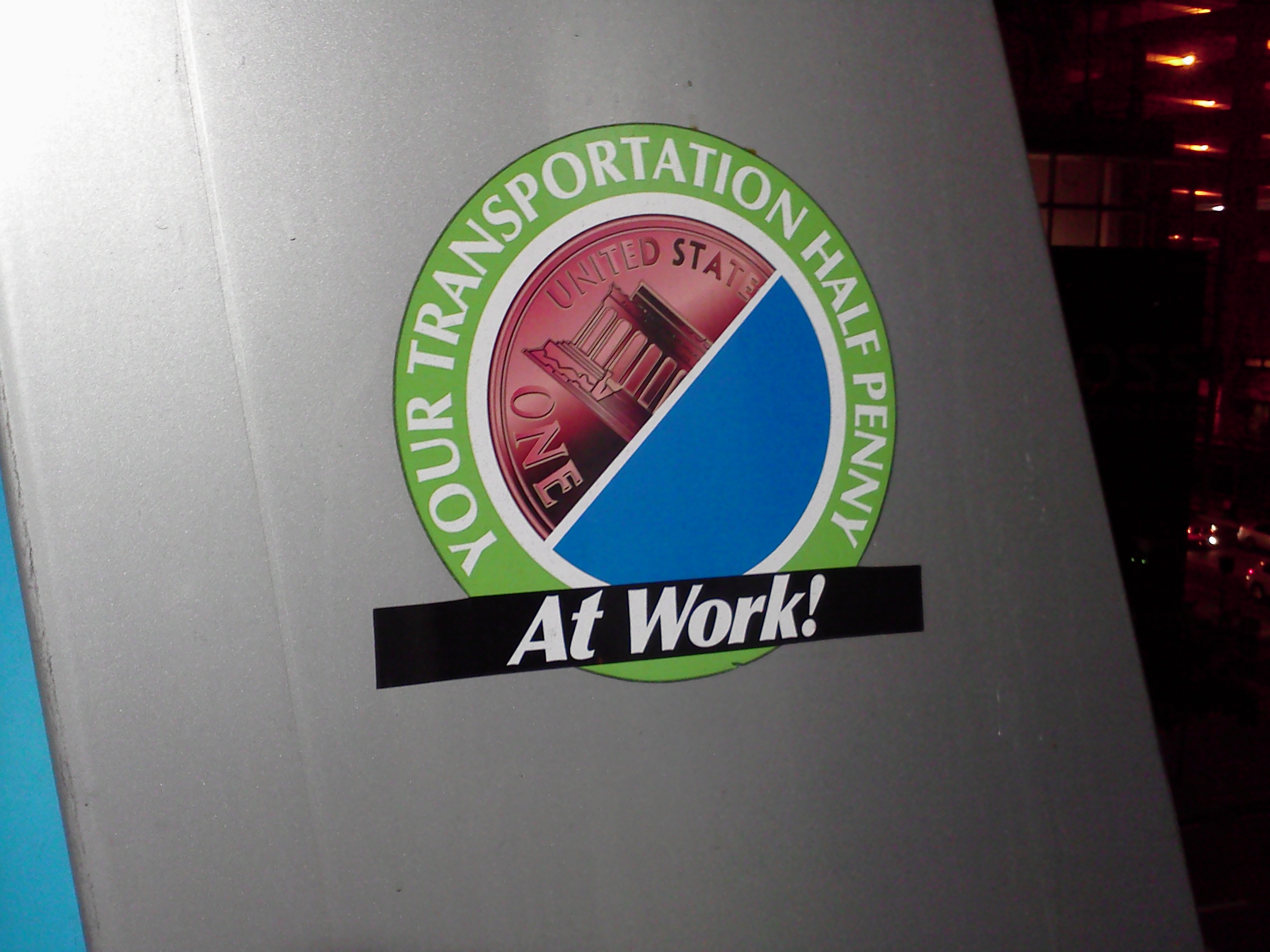
A half-penny transit sales surtax was approved by a 2-to-1 margin by Miami-Dade County voters in 2002 after a previous full cent surtax lost 2-to-1. in 2000.

The region, as with the rest of the state, tends to be more fiscally conservative, generally opting for lower taxes and less government spending. Specifically, in the Miami-Dade area there is a significant population of Cuban-American expatriates and people of Cuban descent, who often default to right-wing politics, seeing it as the opposite of liberalism, which is tied to socialism and seen as similar to the communist regime they escaped. Despite being considered the most liberal region in the state, only about a third of South Floridians surveyed felt they were in a liberal area. At the state level, there is little support for public transit infrastructure; for example, most transit-oriented development planning is done at the city or county level, with Miami-Dade County being considered one of the most active local governments in Florida in terms of transportation planning.

This political nature often leads to more private infrastructure such as roadways. To their credit, Miami-Dade Transit has not been an accountable organization, coming on the brink of shut-down in 2011, when they were audited by the federal government. On the other hand, the many tolled highways in Florida, for example, generate a significant amount of money for the state, whereas like many mass transit systems in the US, systems such as Metrorail and Metromover have always been a significant loss, financially speaking. Even some of the highway toll collection operations in Florida are privatized. Miami-Dade Transit's federal investigation, which included criminal investigation in addition to audits, revealed likely fraud among other wasteful spending; service cuts and a shut down of the AirportLink project nearly resulted. Tri-Rail is considered an exceptional loss; for fiscal year 2010, train revenue was approximately US$10.3 million, while total operating expenses for fiscal year 2010, including depreciation expense, were approximately US$86.9 million. Expenses increased by approximately US$14.9 million or 20.7% when compared to fiscal year 2009. During this time service was cut and an altogether shut down was threatened.

Political corruption from all parties is not uncommon in the South Florida metropolitan area, which consistently has one of the highest crime rates in the nation, coming in first place among the ten largest metropolitan areas for both violent and property crimes in 2011. This leads to a distrust in government; South Florida, particularly Miami, which would likely wax more Democratically, often has lowest voter turnout in the state. Specifically, the public felt deceived when the majority of promises were broken related to the county-wide half penny sales surtax, which was supposed to fund many rapid transit expansions, that was passed in 2002 with about two-thirds of the vote. While many beneficial investments were made as a result of the tax, transit officials candidly admit that the core promise of new Metrorail lines was always an overstatement. It should be noted, however, that the half-penny itself was a trade off from the full penny surtax that would have generated billions of dollars over several decades, which was championed by then-Miami-Dade County Mayor Alex Penelas, but fought successfully by local businessman and community activist Norman Braman.

== History ==
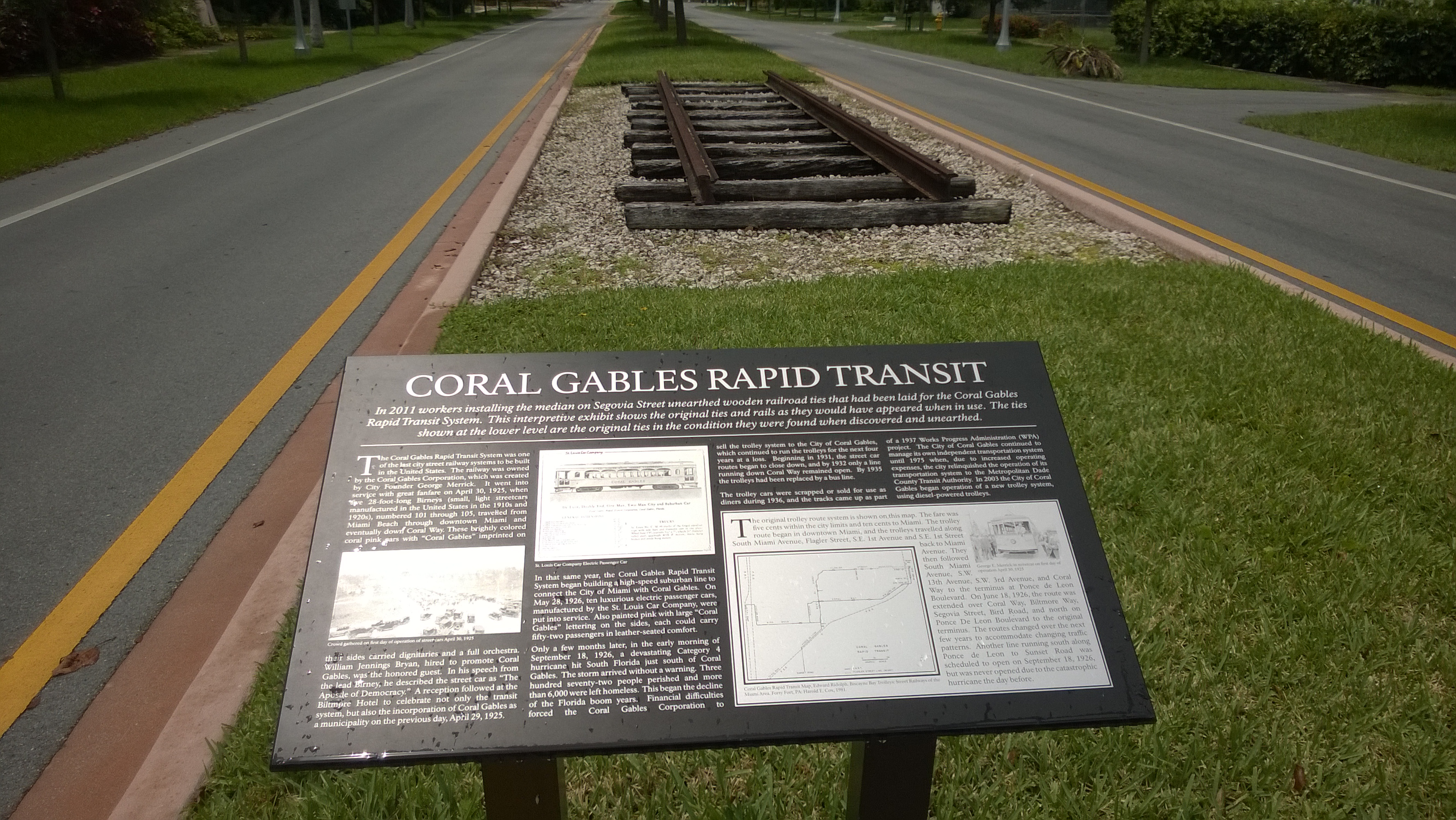
A section of track unearthed during reconstruction of a street in Coral Gables

Although often grouped with other relatively young sunbelt cities, which grew largely in the age of the automobile, Miami and Coral Gables had an extensive early transit system, with a peak in the 1920s. In the city's early years, following its incorporation in 1896, there were several de facto streetcar or trolley systems, many of which were short-lived. The first known electric streetcar was an interurban that operated circa 1906, operated by the Miami Electric Railway Company. Another streetcar began operation in 1909 and was short-lived; another battery-powered streetcar was introduced in 1915 by the Miami Traction Company. It wasn't until 1922 that the more widely known electric streetcar system was implemented, using an extensive overhead catenary. It operated a high-speed line from Miami to Ponce de Leon Boulevard in Coral Gables via Coral Way beginning in 1925. The decline and demise of the streetcars took place over the 1930s, a decade which included the devastating setback of the Coral Gables to Miami route being damaged by the 1935 Labor Day Hurricane; followed by closure of Miami Beach Railway Co. service to Miami Beach via the MacArthur Causeway in 1939, with the system officially closing in 1940 to be replaced with bus service.

The majority of plans to return "streetcar" service to Miami's since 2006 consist of rubber-tired trolleys with no priority in traffic.

Henry Flagler's Florida East Coast Railway passenger service reached Miami the same year it was incorporated as a city, in 1896.

The modern Miami-Dade Transit county agency was created in 1960 as the Metropolitan Transit Authority (MTA), effectively marking the end of privately operated large scale public transportation services in the county, though there continued to be jitneys or minibuses. Miami Urban Area Transportation Study (MUATS) studies for the feasibility of mass transit in Miami-Dade County began in 1964. These studies, which were supplemented by reports by Simon & Curtin Transportation Engineers, continued into the 1970s and recommended a public transit system for the county, citing traffic problems and increasing population. In 1969, a 67-mile (108 km) grade-separated rapid transit system was proposed. It placed priority on connecting Miami Beach to Miami International Airport via downtown and the Port of Miami. Although the AirportLink finally brought rapid transit to the airport in 2012, transit off the mainland is still considered difficult and convoluted due to the remaining absence of a link to the beach.

== Selected images ==
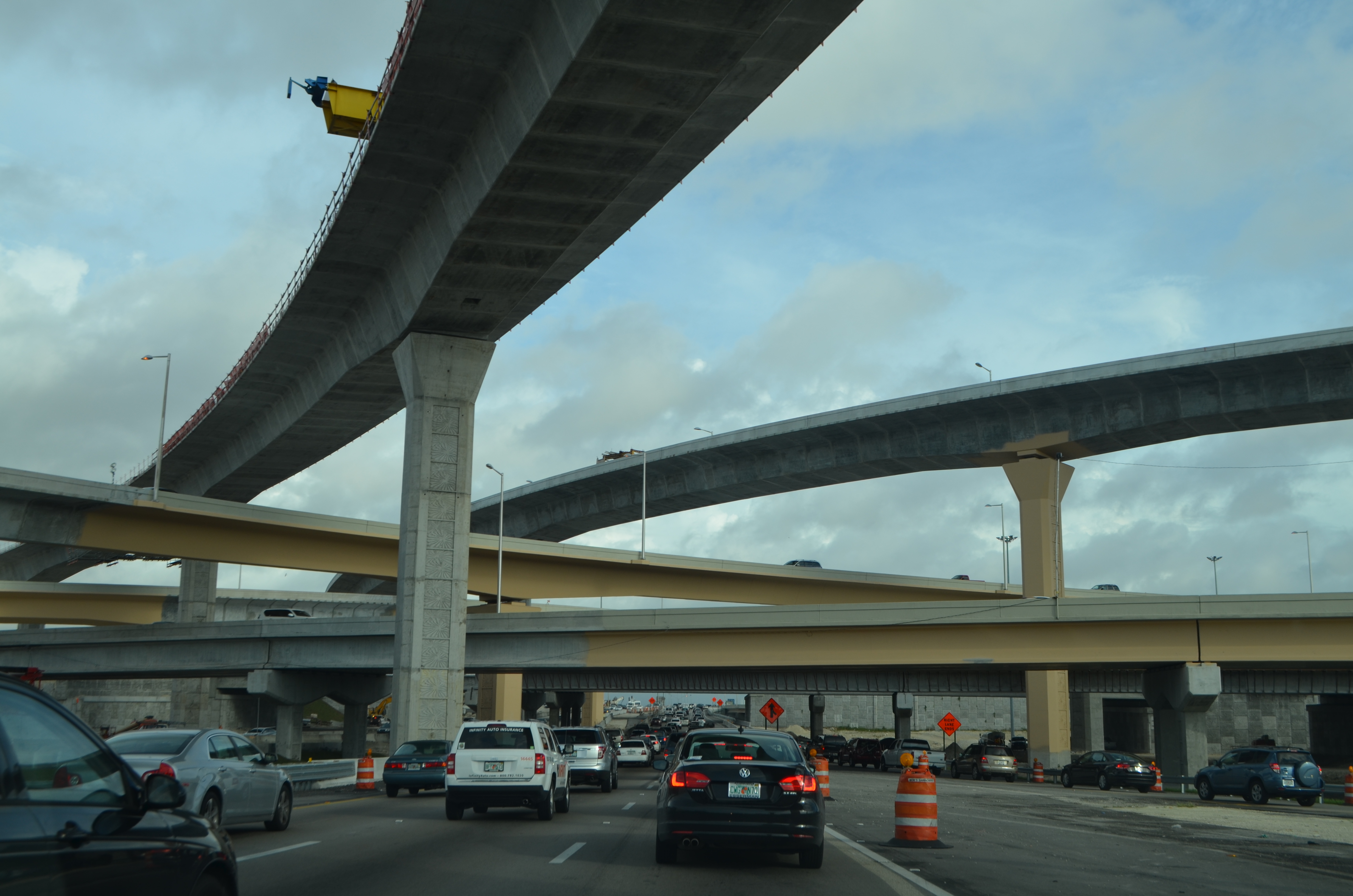
Four-level Dolphin—Palmetto Interchange under construction in early 2015

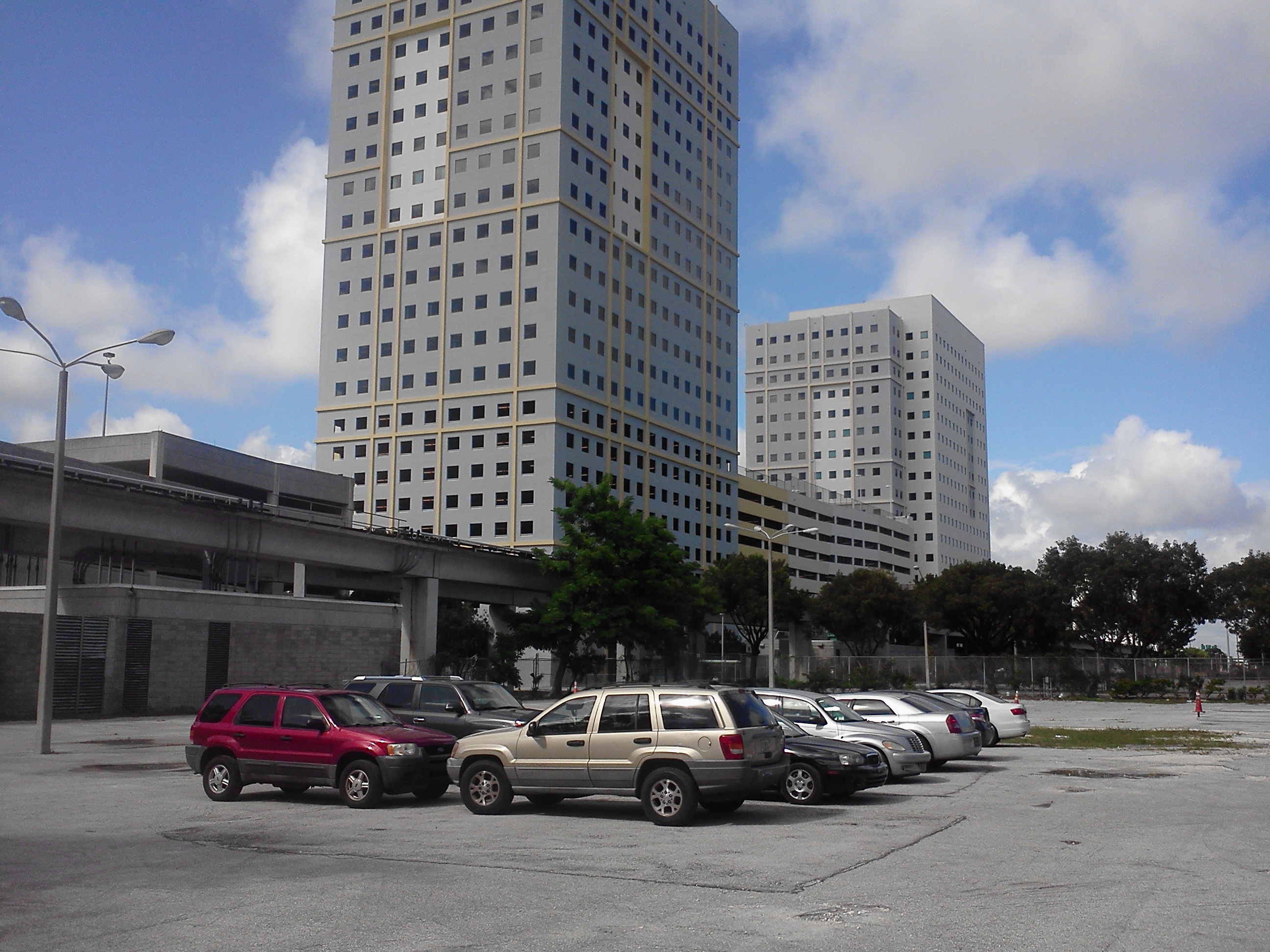
The headquarters of Miami-Dade Transit, known as the Overtown Transit Village, is adjacent to the Historic Overtown-Lyric Theater Metrorail station, yet still has a large parking garage.

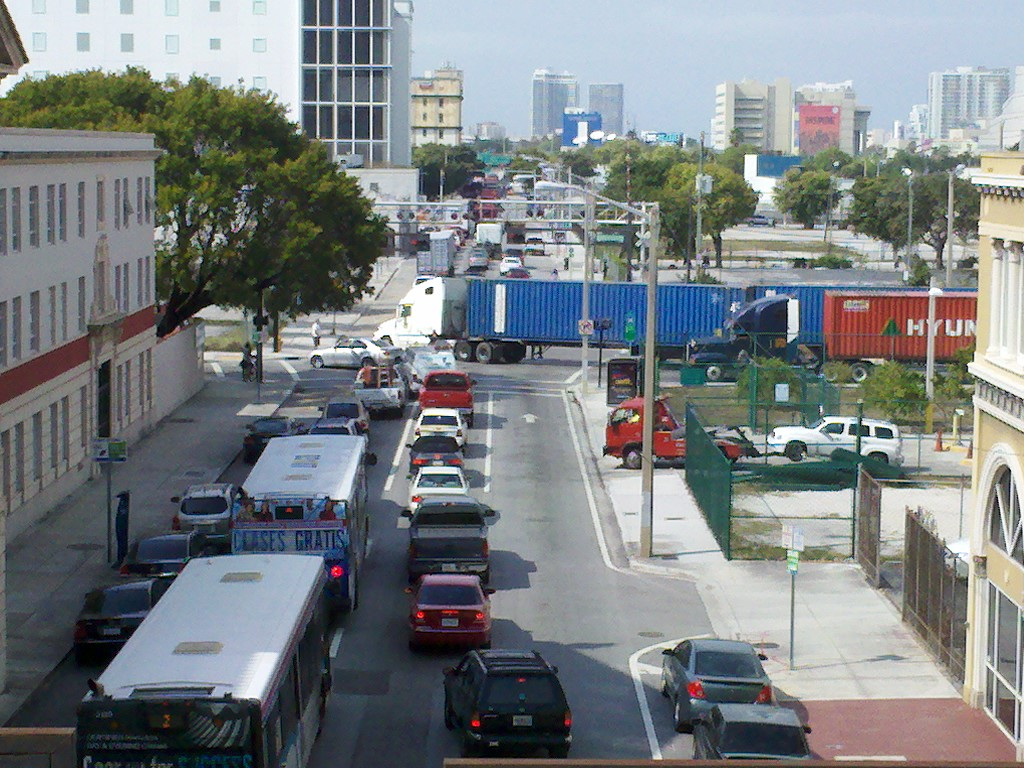
Congestion in Downtown Miami due to container trucks leaving the port. The Port Miami Tunnel helped to relieve this

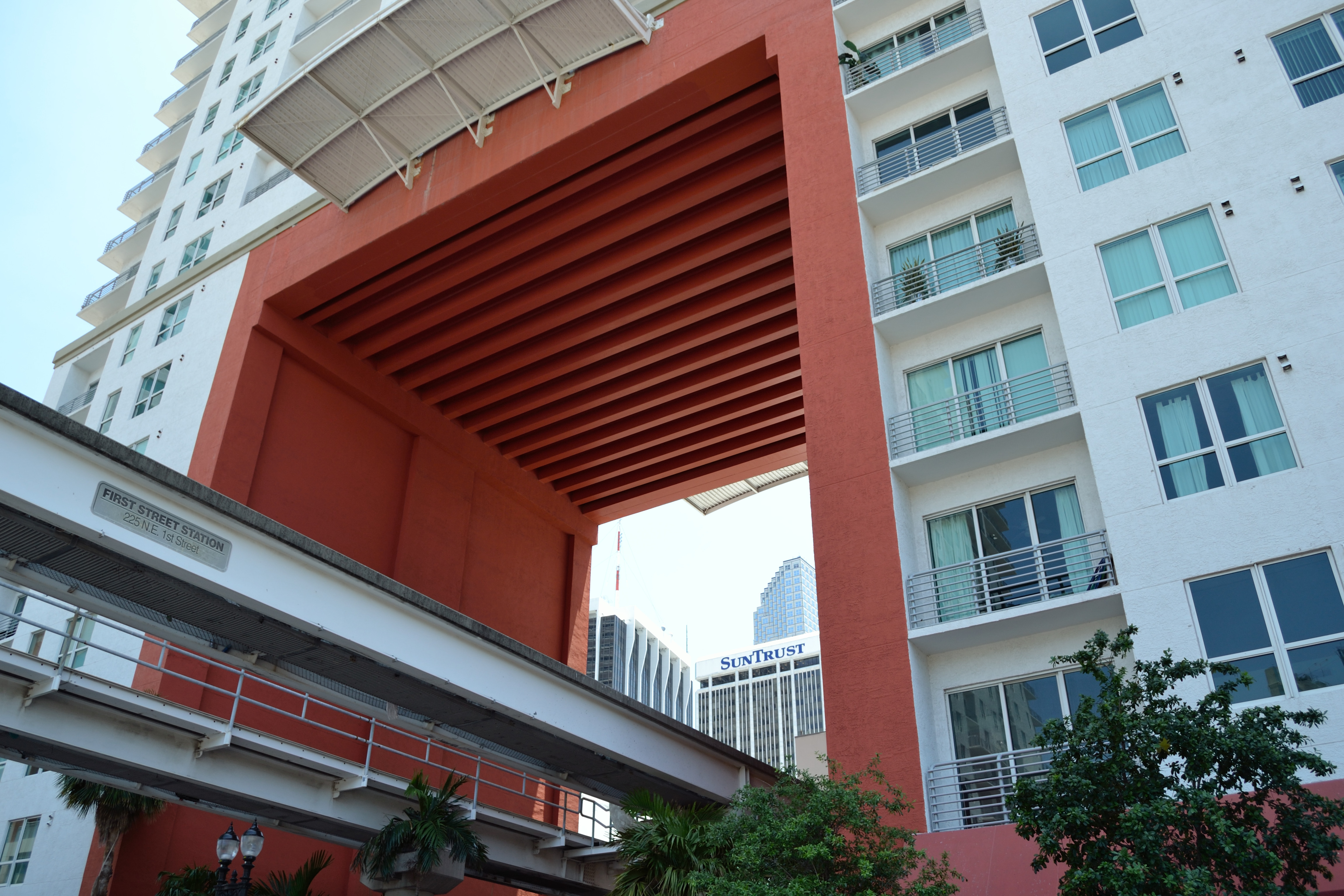
The Loft 2 condominium, which was built around the First Street Metromover station, contains no on-site parking.

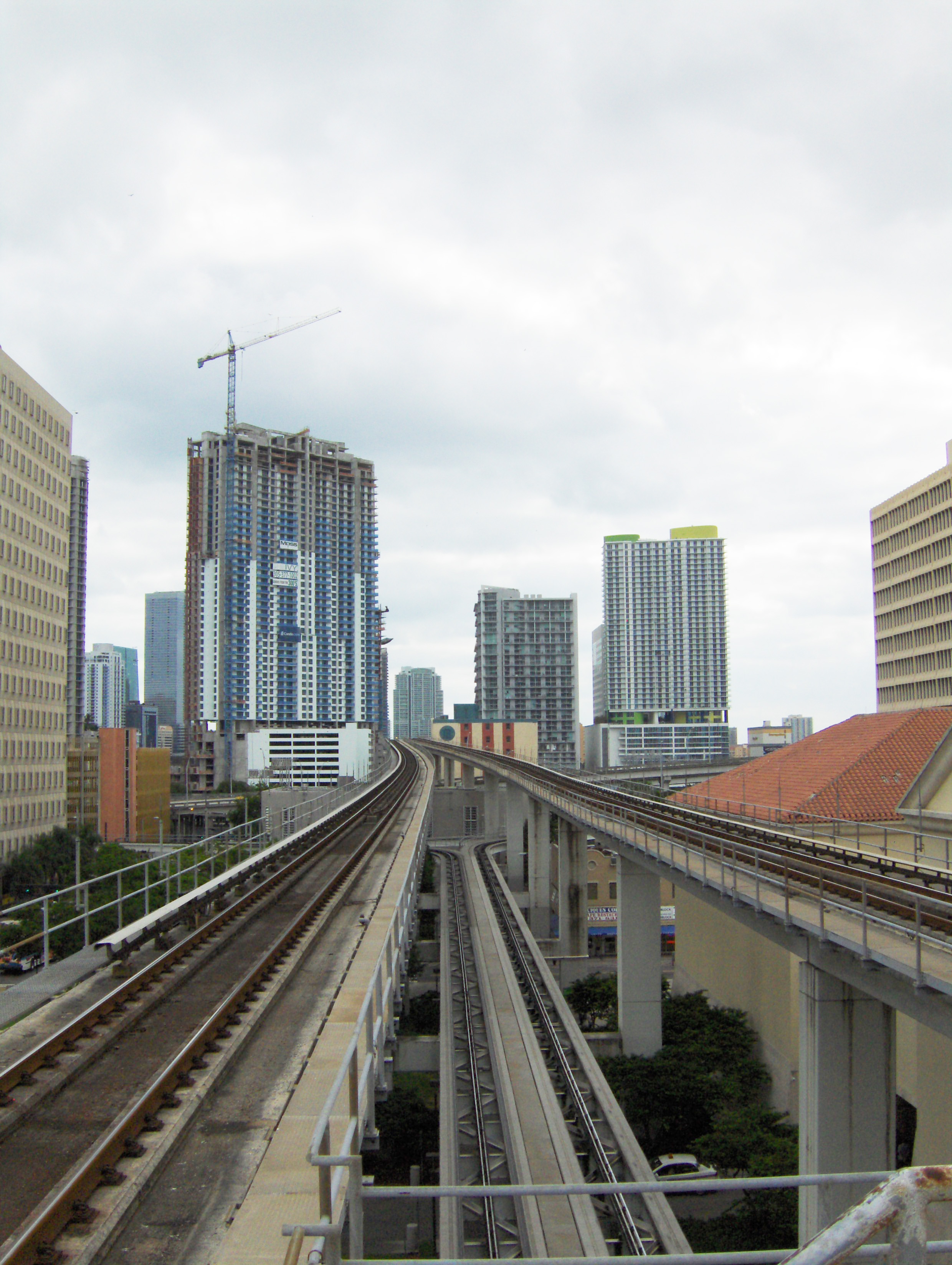
Metrorail tracks run over Metromover tracks at Government Center

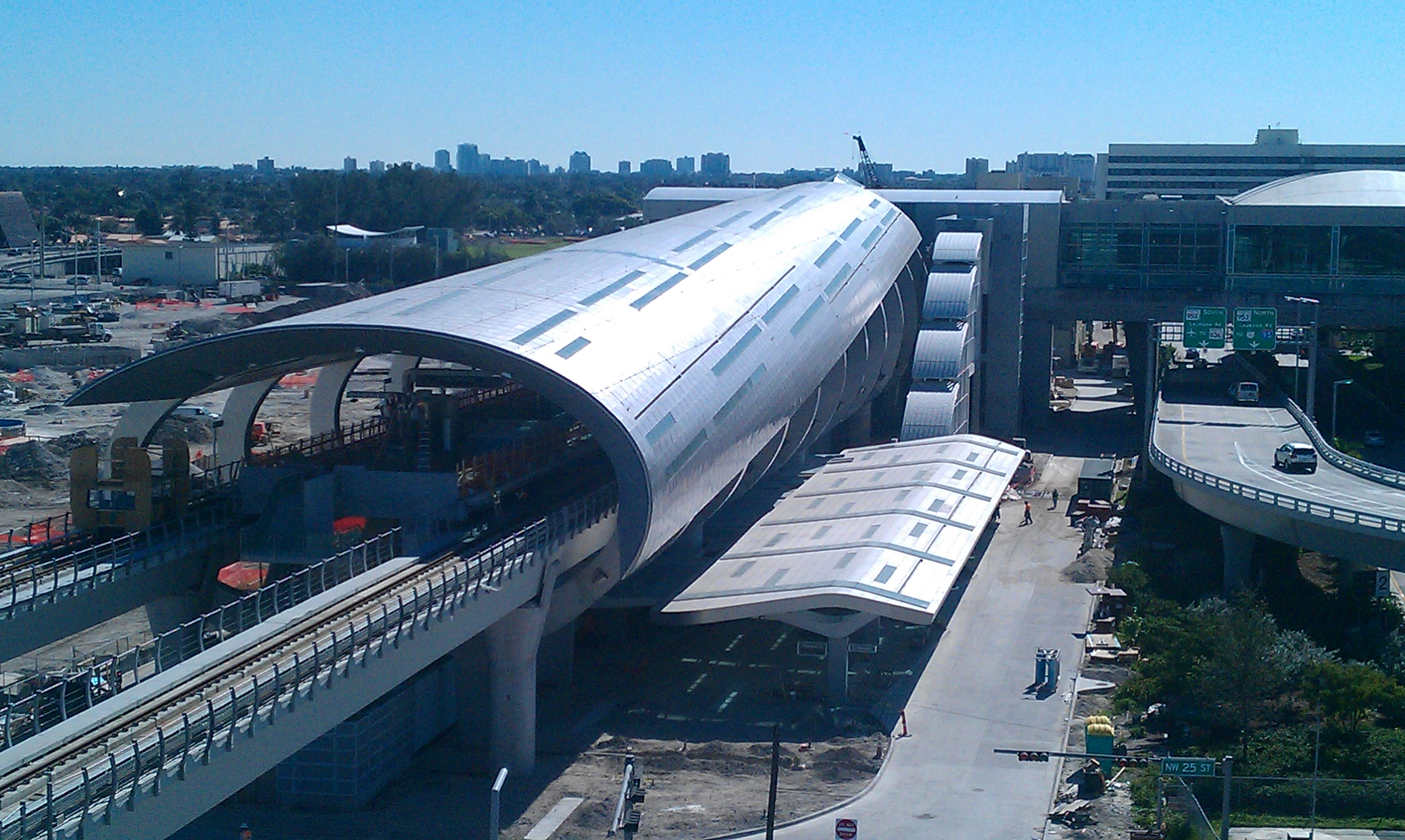
The Miami Intermodal Center being built in December 2011

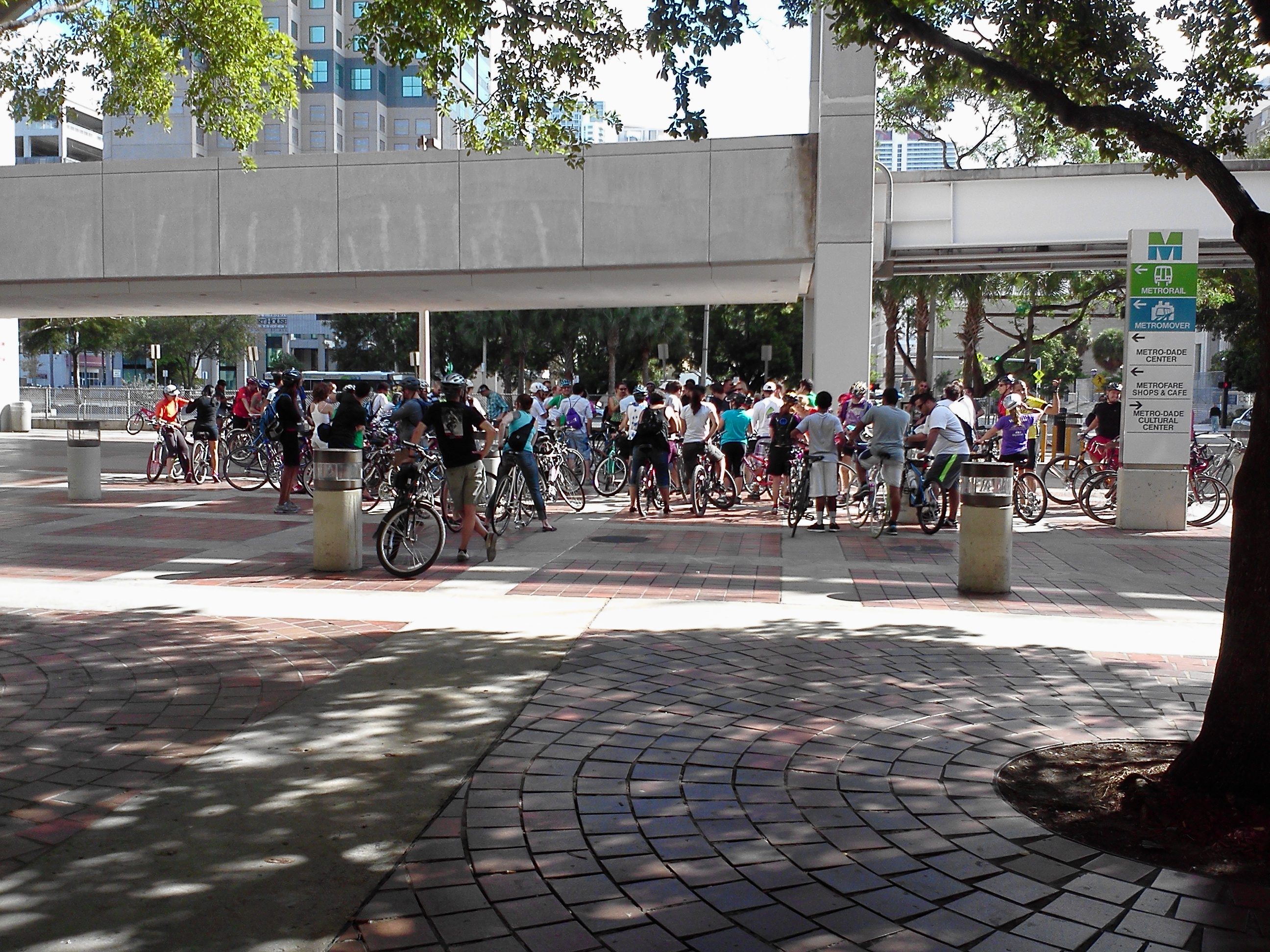
Critical Mass Miami assembling in Government Center

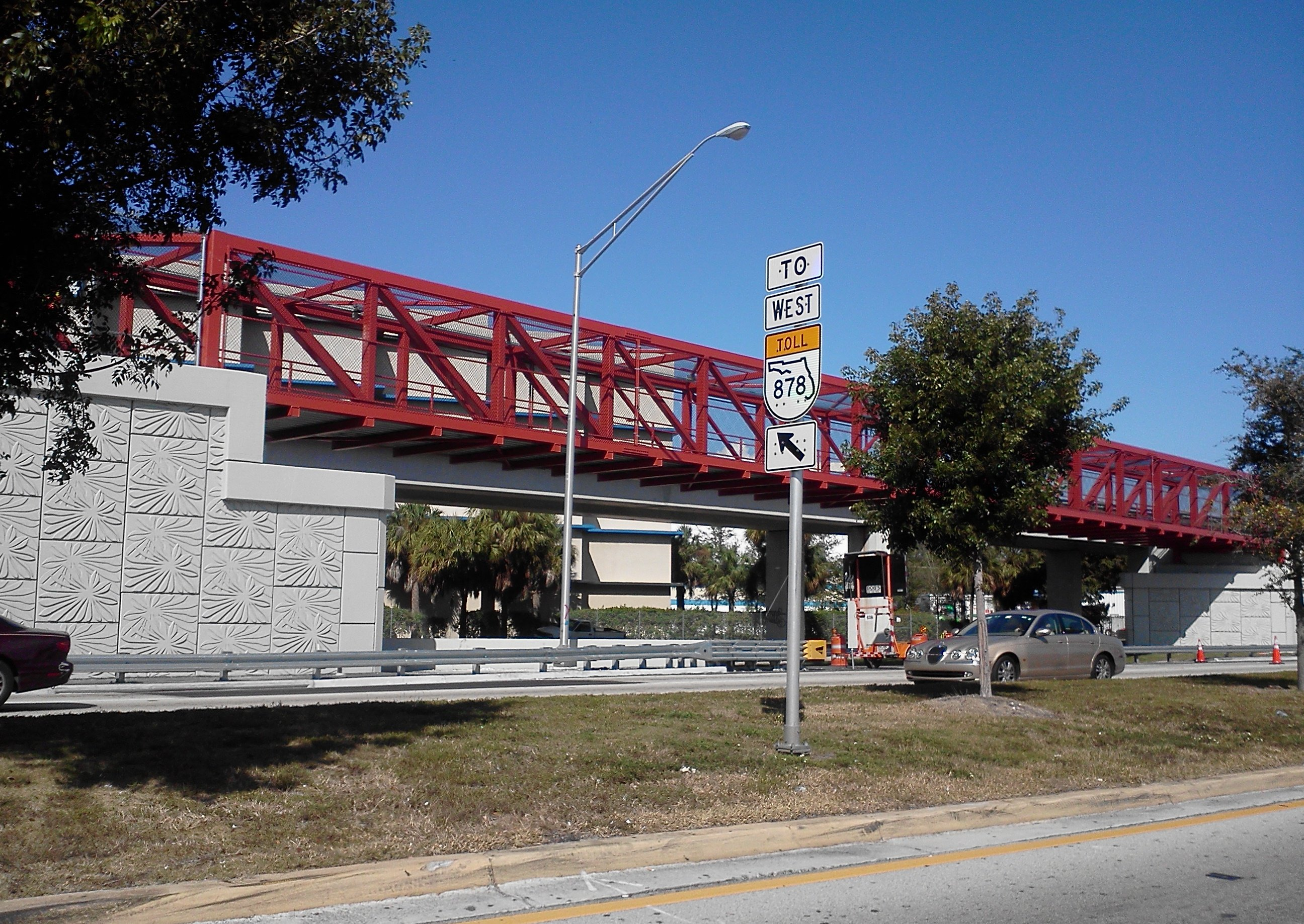
MetroPath bridge over the Snapper Creek Expressway entrance, completed in January 2012

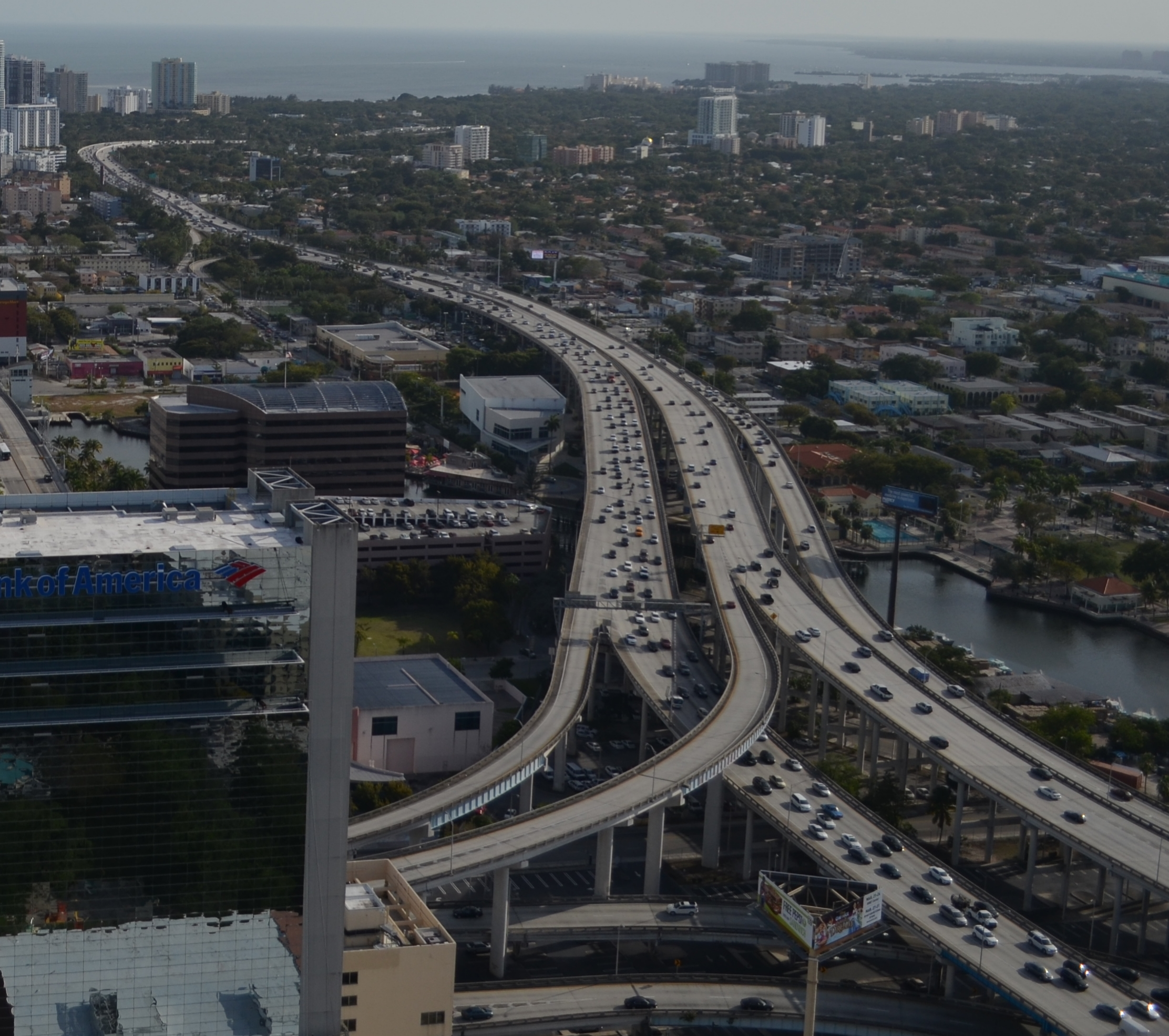
The southernmost 3-mile (5 km) of Interstate 95 where it passes by Downtown Miami are often congested.

== See also ==
- Transportation in Florida
- Plug-in electric vehicles in Florida § Miami
