= Dynamic International Airways Flight 405 =

2015 aviation accident in the United States

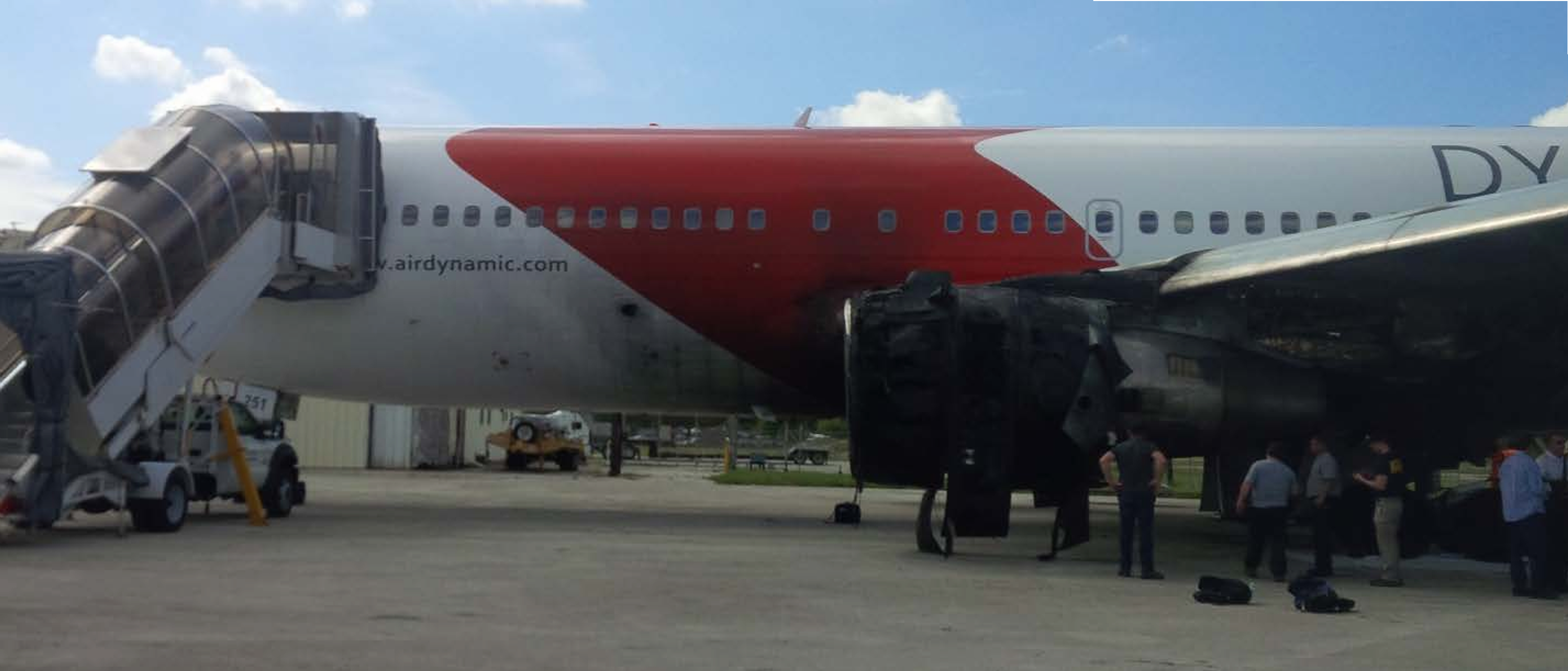
- Left forward fuselage of the aircraft after the fire

Accident
- Date: October 29, 2015
- Summary: Fire on ground due to fuel leak caused by maintenance error
- Site: Fort Lauderdale–Hollywood International Airport, Florida, United States; 26°4′21″N 80°9′10″W

Aircraft
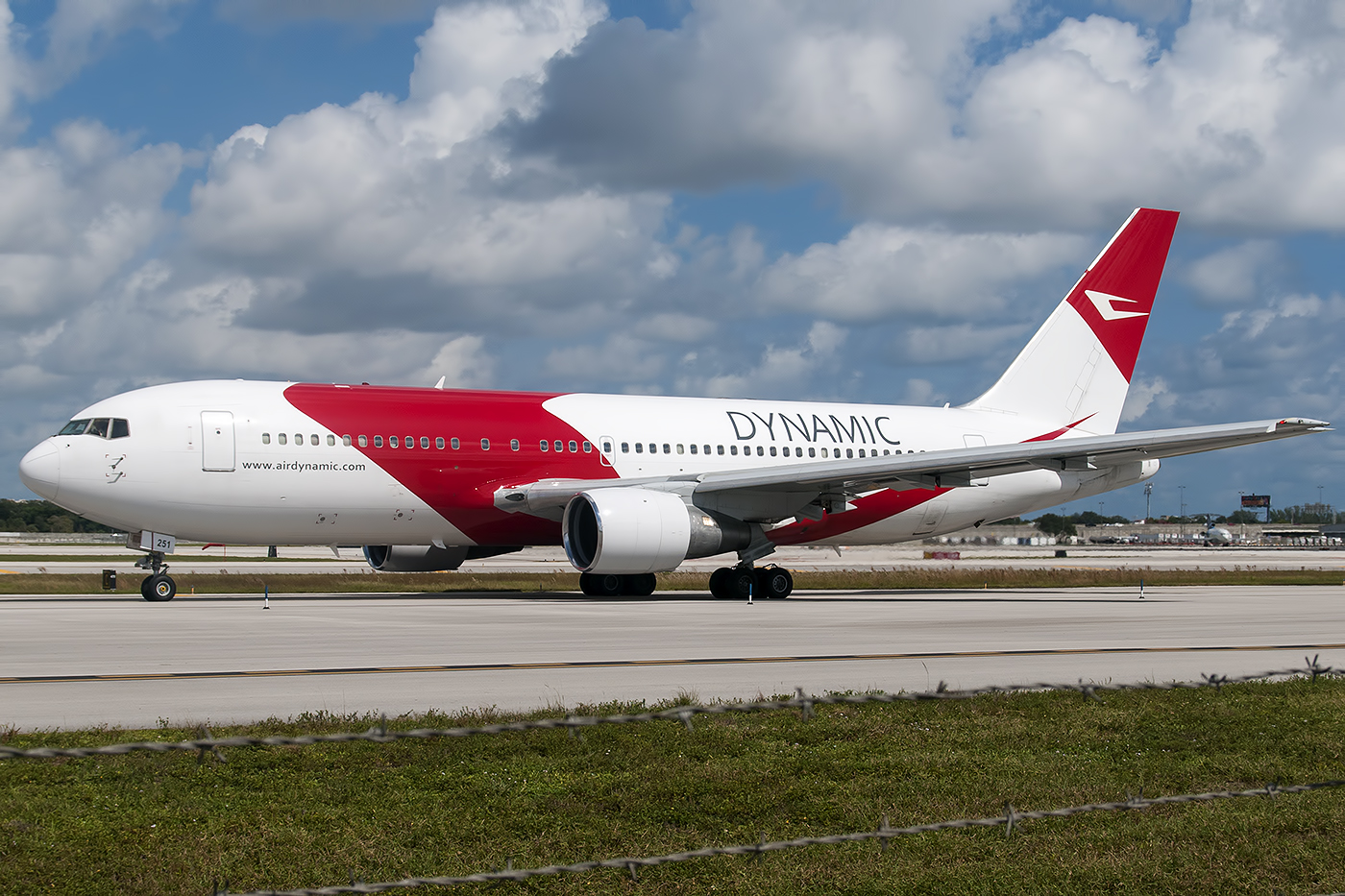
- N251MY, the aircraft involved in the accident
- Aircraft type: Boeing 767-269ER (Note: The aircraft was a Boeing 767-200ER. Boeing assigned a customer code for each customer that orders an aircraft from Boeing. As noted by the article, the original customer ordering this airframe was Kuwait Airways, whose customer code with Boeing is -69, hence Boeing 767-269ER.)
- Operator: Dynamic International Airways
- IATA flight No.: 2D405
- ICAO flight No.: DYA405
- Call sign: DYNAMIC AIR 405
- Registration: N251MY
- Flight origin: Fort Lauderdale–Hollywood International Airport, Florida, United States
- Destination: Simón Bolívar International Airport, Maiquetía, Venezuela
- Occupants: 101
- Passengers: 90
- Crew: 11
- Fatalities: 0
- Injuries: 22
- Survivors: 101

On October 29, 2015, Dynamic International Airways Flight 405, a Boeing 767 on a scheduled international passenger service operating from Fort Lauderdale, Florida, to Caracas, Venezuela, caught on fire while taxiing for departure. All 90 passengers and 11 crew members on board were evacuated using the emergency slides. However, 22 of them were injured. The aircraft was damaged beyond economic repair.

== Accident ==
Flight 405 caught fire while taxiing for departure at Fort Lauderdale-Hollywood International Airport. The aircraft was leaking fuel shortly before it caught fire, according to the pilots of an aircraft that was following Flight 405. All 101 passengers and crew evacuated the aircraft. Of the occupants onboard, 17 passengers and 5 crew members were taken to a local hospital to be treated for injuries. There were no burn injuries. A 62-year-old man was seriously injured after falling from one of the emergency slides used to evacuate the aircraft. Twenty-one others who had minor injuries were admitted to the hospital for abrasions, anxiety, and seat belt syndrome. The airport's two runways were closed. The south runway reopened around 3:20 PM.

== Aircraft ==
The aircraft involved was a Boeing 767-269ER registered as N251MY with serial number 23280. The 131st Boeing 767 built, it first flew on January 30, 1986, and was delivered to Kuwait Airways approximately seven weeks later. While owned by Kuwait Airways, the airframe was leased at times to EgyptAir, Qatar Airways, and Polynesian Airlines.

In 1995, Kuwait Airways sold the airframe to Birgenair, which subsequently leased the airframe to Alas Nacionales and LAN Airlines. Following the collapse of Birgenair shortly after the crash of Birgenair Flight 301, Air Gabon acquired the airframe for two years until its acquisition by First Security Corporation (now part of Wells Fargo) in 1999. The plane was then stored for the next five years out of service until United Arab Emirates-based Phoenix Aviation (later AVE.com) purchased the frame from Wells Fargo in 2004, leasing it to Kam Air in early 2004.

Current owner KMW Leasing of Salt Lake City, Utah (owned by the founder and former CEO of Extra Space Storage, who in turn also is a part-owner of Dynamic International Airways) acquired the plane from AVE.com in June 2006, who subsequently leased the airframe on a "power by the hour" basis to MAXjet and Sunny Airways prior to its placement with Dynamic. Despite its age of nearly 30 years, as of October 6, 2015, the airframe had only flown for 29,970 hours over 9,937 flight cycles. Previous to being leased by Dynamic International Airways, the aircraft was in dry storage for approximately 29 months. Dynamic had only logged 240 hours during the six-week period prior to the fire at Fort Lauderdale.

== Investigation ==
The National Transportation Safety Board (NTSB) began an investigation. On November 3, 2015, the NTSB released an update to its ongoing investigation, which stated that they found that the main fuel supply line coupling assembly had disconnected in the wing-to-engine strut above and behind the left engine. Examination of the left engine revealed no evidence of an uncontained engine failure or other types of failure. Also, the lower inboard portion of the left wing, left engine cowling, and left fuselage center section sustained thermal damage. The fire did not penetrate the fuselage. The report condemned some passengers for taking their luggage.

The final report on the accident was released on June 1, 2020. The report concluded that the failure of the main fuel line coupling assembly was "the failure of maintenance personnel to install the required safety lock wire." The NTSB also criticized the flight crew for initiating the emergency evacuation while the right engine was still running.
