= PREMO Light Rail =

Overview
- Status: In planning
- Owner: Broward County
- Locale: Fort Lauderdale, Florida, United States
- Stations: 3 (Phase 1)

Service
- Type: Light Rail
- System: Broward County Transit
- Operator(s): Broward County Transit

History
- Planned opening: 2028 (Phase 1)

Technical
- Line length: 3.5 mi (5.6 km) (Phase 1)
- Character: Fully elevated

PREMO Light Rail (also known as Broward County Light Rail) is a proposed light rail transit system planned in Broward County, Florida, United States. The system would connect Fort Lauderdale-Hollywood International Airport and Port Everglades. If completed, the light rail system would be owned by Broward County and operated by Broward County Transit.

== Description ==
Plans for the PREMO Light Rail system were announced in early 2023 as part of Broward County Transit's Premium Mobility Plan (PREMO), a $4.4 billion, 30-year program to improve public mass transportation service within the county. This program was approved by county residents in 2018, when a 1% transportation surtax to fund the new projects was passed by voters.

The first phase of the light rail system – a 3.5-mile (5.6 km) line running between Fort Lauderdale—Hollywood International Airport and the Broward County Convention Center in downtown Fort Lauderdale – was proposed to be completed by 2028-2029 at an estimated cost of $1.25 billion. The light rail system is also one of several infrastructure projects relating to Fort Lauderdale—Hollywood International Airport and Port Everglades targeted for completion by the early 2030s. Fort Lauderdale—Hollywood International Airport is the second busiest in South Florida, behind Miami International Airport, and Port Everglades is one of the world's busiest cruise ship ports, behind PortMiami.

Approximately 130,000–665,000 passengers are projected to ride the PREMO Light Rail system annually. Trains are expected to run every 5-to-10 minutes.

In 2024, it was announced that the Broward County Transportation Department awarded a contract for designing the light rail system to Jacobs.

== Routing ==
PREMO Light Rail is planned to be built in multiple phases.

=== Phase 1 ===
Phase 1 is planned to include the construction of the initial 3.5 miles (5.6 km) of the system, running on an elevated alignment from an intermodal center at Fort Lauderdale—Hollywood International Airport to Port Everglades and the Broward County Convention Center; the intermodal center at the airport is planned to connect the light rail line to the airport terminals via a new automated people mover, and to a new commuter rail station via a walkway. The system's initial operations are planned to operate along the line built in this phase of the project. A maintenance and storage facility is planned to also be constructed as part of this phase.

Phase 1 is expected to be completed by 2028.

=== Phase 2 ===
Phase 2 is planned to extend the system further north and west through Fort Lauderdale, via the Dixie Highway (SR 811) and Broward Boulevard (SR 842). It is planned to be constructed after the completion of the first phase.

=== Future extensions ===
Future extensions of the system is planned to extend light rail service west to the Sawgrass Mills Mall in Sunrise, with two routing options proposed. One option would bring the system further north to near North Lauderdale, before turning west and southwest to the mall. Another option would see the system continue west to the mall via Sunrise Boulevard (SR 838).

Once all extensions are constructed, the system is expected to be 23.3 miles (37.5 km) in total length.

== Stations ==
Three stations are planned to be built as part of the first phase of construction – and be served by trains upon the commencement of PREMO Light Rail's initial operations. From south-to-north, these stations are:

- Fort Lauderdale–Hollywood International Airport Intermodal Center
- Port Everglades
- Broward County Convention Center

== See also ==
- Transportation in South Florida
- Wave Streetcar – A cancelled downtown Fort Lauderdale light rail system
- TECO Line Streetcar – A streetcar system in Tampa
