= Flight 405 =

Flight 405 may refer to:

- Mohawk Airlines Flight 405 (1972), crashed on final approach to Albany International Airport, killing 17.
- Finnair Flight 405 (1978), hijacked, all survived.
- Indian Airlines Flight 405, hijacked, all survived.
- USAir Flight 405 (1992), crashed shortly after liftoff from New York City LaGuardia airport, killing 27.
- IBC Airways Flight 405 (2013), crashed after an in-flight breakup.
- Dynamic Airways Flight 405 (2015), caught fire but all survived.
