= The Wave (streetcar) =

Overview
- Status: Cancelled
- Owner: Broward County
- Locale: Fort Lauderdale, Florida, U.S.
- Stations: 13

Service
- Type: Streetcar
- System: Broward County Transit
- Rolling stock: 5 low-floor streetcars

History
- Planned opening: 2021

Technical
- Track length: 2.7 mi (4.3 km)
- Character: At-grade
- Track gauge: 4 ft 8 1/4 in (1,429 mm)

The Wave was a planned 2.7-mile (4.3 km) streetcar line in Fort Lauderdale, Florida. Construction costs were estimated to be $200 million. The project was cancelled in 2018, but another project known as PREMO Light Rail was proposed.

== Timeline ==
The first phase included a 1.4-mile (2.3 km) downtown loop. Broward County would have owned and operated the line. Ridership was anticipated from the downtown bus terminal, hospitals, courthouses, tourists, residents and office workers. The line would have connected with the Sun Trolley buses reaching additional neighborhoods, beaches, Las Olas Boulevard, Tri-Rail, and the Fort Lauderdale Airport. By 2016, however, physical work had yet to begin; by then the start of construction was pushed to 2017, with completion in 2020, subsequently revised to 2021. The project was cancelled in 2018.

== Cost and funding ==
The electric streetcar system was estimated to cost $125 million, and was being planned for the downtown. Construction funding would have come from federal ($62.5 million), state ($37 million) and city taxpayers ($10.5 million), with approximately $15 million from assessments on properties located within the Downtown Development Authority. Broward County Transit (BCT) had committed to operating the system for the first 10 years at an expected annual cost of $2 million, and had guaranteed funding to cover any shortfall in ridership revenues. The construction cost of $50 million per mile was considerably higher than other recently built streetcar projects, in part due to the challenges of building an electric transit system over the 3rd Avenue drawbridge.

In July 2013, the Fort Lauderdale city commissioners approved a tax on downtown property owners, providing the final part of funding needed for the project's construction to begin.

In September 2017, BCT placed an order with Siemens for five streetcars for the Wave, at a total cost of $31.4 million, including a supply of spare parts. They would have been a version of Siemens' S70 model with a length that had been reported variously as either 83.3 feet (25.4 m) or 79 feet (24.1 m).

In late 2017, the project was again put on hold after all the high construction bids were rejected.

== Cancellation ==
In May 2018, shortly after the election of Mayor Dean Trantalis and Commissioners Steve Glassman and Ben Sorensen (all of whom had promised to kill the controversial Wave streetcar), Fort Lauderdale City Commissioners voted 3-2 to withdraw from the Wave streetcar project, thus ending the project. Broward County Commissioners then followed Fort Lauderdale’s lead and voted to withdraw their support as well.

Over $33.7 million taxpayer dollars were spent on The Wave prior to its cancellation: "project managers... spent $33.7 million in federal, state and local tax dollars and assessments planning for the rail system, according to figures compiled through March 31 [2018] by Fort Lauderdale Auditor John Herbst. The final bill will be higher and does not include money spent by the city and its Downtown Development Authority to develop the project... $9.4 million came from the federal government, $11.1 million from the state and $8.7 million from the city and its downtown authority, and another $4.2 million from the regional transportation authority. Broward’s spent share, according to Herbst, is only about $550,000 so far."

== See also ==
- Transportation in South Florida
- PREMO Light Rail
- Tri-Rail, Coastal Link
- Brightline
- Metromover, Miami's elevated light rail
