= Alas Nacionales =

Dominican airline

Alas Nacionales S.A.
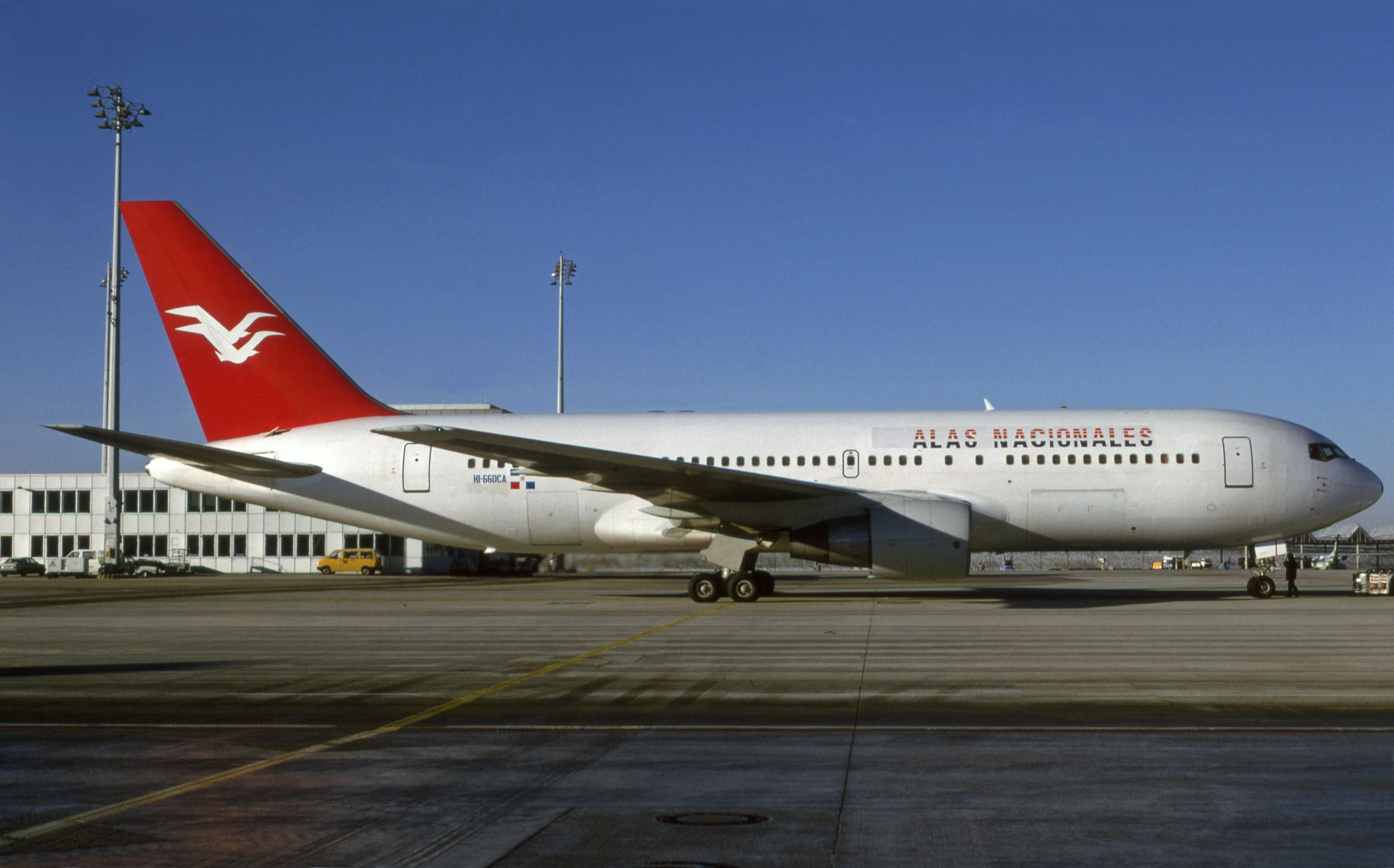
IATA	ICAO	Call sign
-	ALW	ALAS NACIONALES DOMINICANAS
- Founded: 1995; 31 years ago
- Ceased operations: April 1996; 30 years ago
- Hubs: Gregorio Luperón International Airport
- Alliance: Birgenair
- Fleet size: 1
- Headquarters: Puerto Plata, Dominican Republic

Alas Nacionales S.A. ("National Wings" in Spanish) was a Puerto Plata-based carrier that operated charter flights between Dominican Republic and Germany. The airline served as a representative of Birgenair.

== History ==
In summer 1994, the German tour operator Öger Tours and the small German airline Ratioflug entered into a cooperation to offer low-cost charter flights from Germany to the Dominican Republic in winter 94/95. The German Federal Ministry of Transport granted traffic rights to Ratioflug for period of six months. Because Ratioflug did not have any airplane with corresponding capacity and range it leased a Boeing 757-200 from the Turkish airline Birgenair for these flights.

In order to continue the charter flights in the next winter season, Öger Tours and Birgenair went into a cooperation with Alas Nacionales in summer 1995. This Dominican airline was founded in Puerto Plata by the Finn Matti Puhakka and six other shareholders earlier that year. The company owned an Air Operator Certificate, but no aircraft at that time. It was agreed that Birgenair organize and operate the flights of Alas Nacionales. In return Matti Puhakka and his business partners were offered a remuneration of 10 DM per registered passenger. After Alas Nacionales received traffic rights to Germany the airline officially leased a Boeing 767-200ER from Birgenair. On October 25, 1995 the Turkish aircraft was registered in the Dominican Republic as HI-660CA. A week later the flights to Germany began, they were carried out by Turkish crews.

Due to a defective hydraulic pump on the Boeing 767, it was not available for Birgenair Flight 301 from Puerto Plata to Frankfurt via Berlin on February 6, 1996, so that this flight was carried out exceptionally with Boeing 757-200 from Birgenair. Due to the shorter range of this type, a refuel stop in Gander was planned. The aircraft crashed shortly after takeoff from Puerto Plata Airport. Birgenair had leased this Boeing 757 in November 1995 to the Argentine airline Servicios de Transportes Aéreos Fueguinos (STAF) and operated it on five flights between the Dominican Republic and Buenos Aires until January 1996. Afterwards the aircraft was not transferred back to Turkey, but remained in Puerto Plata.

Both airlines suspended their operations and eventually vanished in the same year after the crash.

== Fleet ==
- 1 Boeing 757-200 (short time lease from Birgenair. The same aircraft that crashed as Flight 301)
- 1 Boeing 767-200ER (leased from Birgenair)

== Accidents and incidents ==
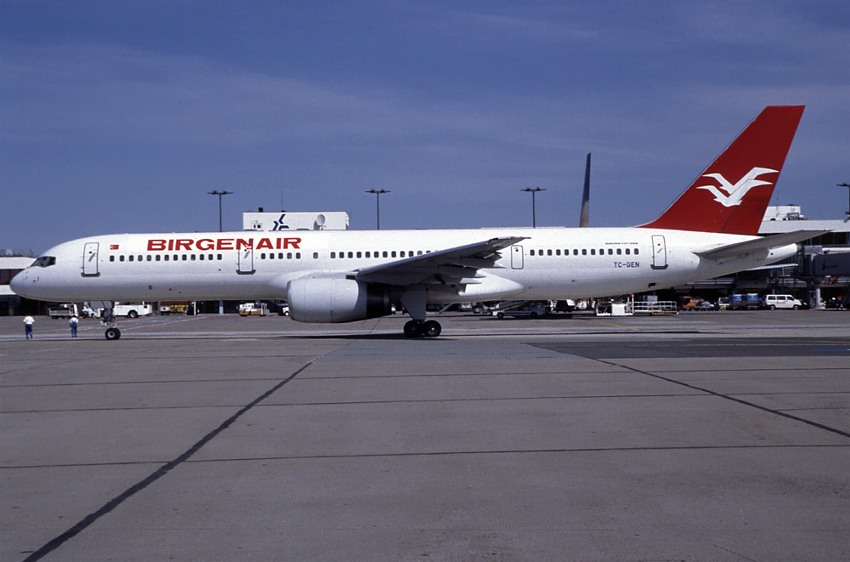
TC-GEN, the aircraft used for Birgenair Flight 301

- On February 6, 1996, Alas Nacionales Flight 301 (Operated by Birgenair) was bound for Frankfurt, Germany but crashed shortly after take-off from Puerto Plata Airport in the Dominican Republic into Atlantic Ocean 26 kilometers off-shore. All 176 passengers and 13 crew members, among them 154 Germans and 9 Polish people, were killed. It was found that one of the air speed indicators of the Boeing 757-200 was not working properly, confusing the pilots about whether the plane's speed was too fast or too slow. Massive negative publicity about Birgenair and other discount flight organizers in Germany following the disaster caused a sharp decline in reservations, and finally the company went into bankruptcy and closed later that same year, 1996.

== See also ==
- List of defunct airlines of the Dominican Republic
