= Marek Wielgus =

Polish politician (1950–1996)

Sejm of the Republic of Poland
- In office 19 September 1993 – 6 February 1996

Personal details
- Born: 20 December 1950 Warsaw, Poland
- Died: 6 February 1996 (aged 45) 26 km (16 mi; 14 nmi) NE of Puerto Plata, Dominican Republic
- Party: Nonpartisan Bloc for Support of Reforms
- Awards: Knight's Cross

Marek Wielgus (20 December 1950 – 6 February 1996) was a Polish sports activist, photographer, and Sejm deputy on his second-term.

He died with Zbigniew Gorzelańczyk on 6 February 1996 on Birgenair Flight 301.

== Biography ==
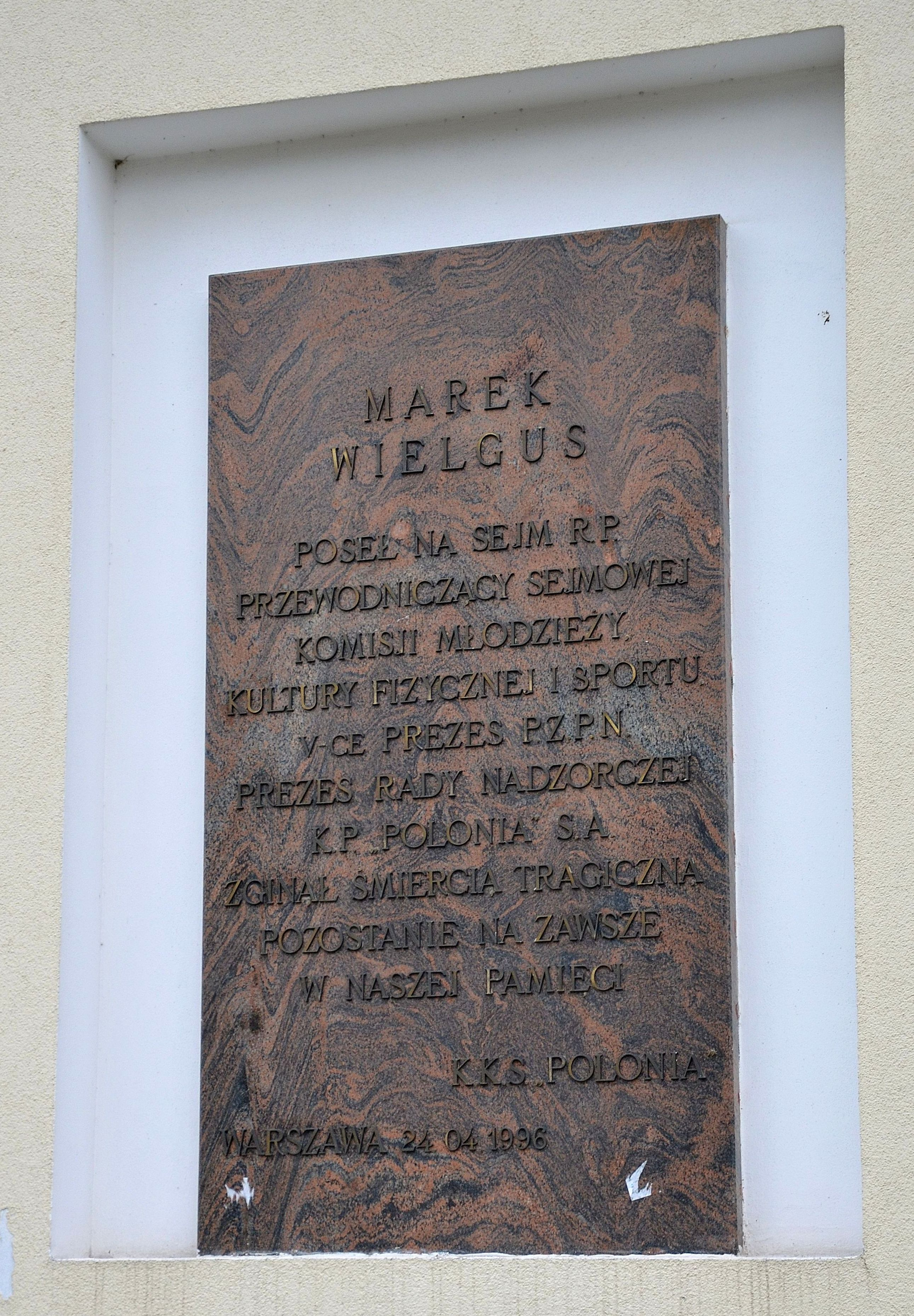
Memorial plaque of Marek Wielgus on the General Kazimierz Sosnkowski Municipal Stadium

Wielgus had a diverse career in sports photography, entrepreneurship, and politics. After graduating from the School of Artistic Crafts in Warsaw in 1970, he began working with publications such as the "Sportowiec" magazine and later established his own magazine called Mecz (Match). His work in sports photography led him to cover the FIFA World Cup on four occasions.

Wielgus also founded the first Laboratory of Professional Photography in Poland. He published several photo albums and curated exhibitions showcasing his own works. In addition to his artistic pursuits, Wielgus was involved in football. From 1993 to 1996, he owned the football section of Polonia Warsaw and served as the chairman of its supervisory board.

Wielgus was involved in politics as well. In the 1991 Polish parliamentary election, he ran as an independent candidate on the Alliance of Democrats' list but was not successful. However, in 1993, he was elected as a second-term deputy from the Nonpartisan Bloc for Support of Reforms. During his time in the Sejm, he directed the Youth Commission, Physical Culture, and Sport.

Wielgus and Lesław Ćmikiewicz played roles in organizing Students' Sports Clubs and mini football tournaments for children associated with UKS. These efforts aimed to promote sports among young people. In 1995, Wielgus became vice-president of the Polish Football Association management board, contributing to the development of football in Poland.

Following the dissolution of the BBWR (Citizens' Movement for Democratic Action), Wielgus joined the Republican Party.

Wielgus, along with parliament member Zbigniew Gorzelańczyk, died in the crash of Birgenair Flight 301 in the Dominican Republic in 1996. Wielgus was posthumously honored with the Knight's Cross by the Order of Polonia Restituta.

A commemorative plaque was installed at the General Kazimierz Sosnkowski Municipal Stadium in 1996 as a tribute to his memory.
