= Zbigniew Gorzelańczyk =

Polish politician (1944–1996)

Sejm of the Republic of Poland
- In office 19 September 1993 – 6 February 1996

Personal details
- Born: 31 July 1944 Leszno, Poland
- Died: 6 February 1996 (aged 51) 26 km (16 mi; 14 nmi) NE of Puerto Plata, Dominican Republic
- Party: Democratic Left Alliance
- Awards: Knight's Cross

Zbigniew Gorzelańczyk (31 July 1944 – 6 February 1996) was a Polish politician, and Sejm deputy for two terms until his death in 1996.

Gorzelańczyk graduated from the Academy of Physical Education in Wroclaw in 1968, and the Political University in Moscow in 1983. He was elected twice in the Leszno-Zielona Góra and Leszno districts of the Democratic Left Alliance.

Gorzelańczyk and parliament member Marek Wielgus were killed in the 1996 crash of Birgenair Flight 301 in the Dominican Republic.

He was posthumously awarded the following:

Knight's Cross of the Order of Polonia Restituta.

== Bibliography ==
- Strona sejmowa posła II kadencji
