= Birgenair =

Turkish charter airline

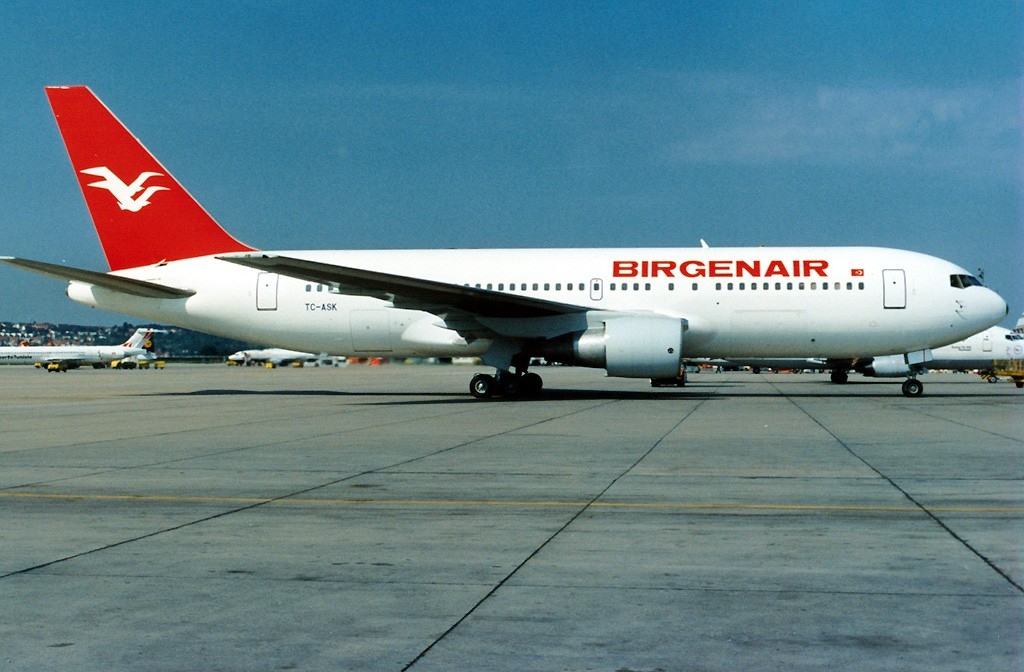
- A Birgenair Boeing 767-200ER
IATA	ICAO	Call sign
KT	BHY	BIRGENAIR
- Founded: 1988; 38 years ago
- Ceased operations: October 1996; 29 years ago
- Hubs: Istanbul Atatürk Airport
- Fleet size: 1 (at time of closure)
- Headquarters: Istanbul, Turkey
- Key people: Çetin Birgen (Founder)

Birgenair was a Turkish charter airline established in 1988 with headquarters in Istanbul, Turkey. It ceased operations in October 1996, following the crash of Birgenair Flight 301.

== History ==
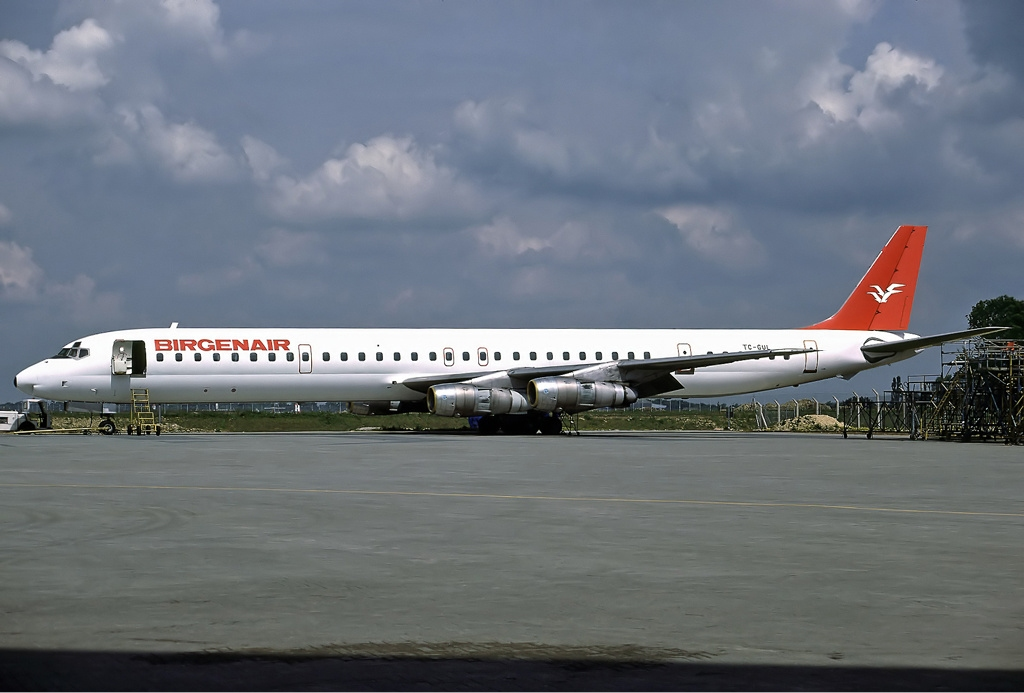
A Birgenair Douglas DC-8-61 at London Stansted Airport in 1989

Birgenair was founded in 1988 and began flight operations in August 1989 with a Douglas DC-8-61. The aircraft initially came on special charter flights for Turkish guest workers. With the increase in mass tourism in Turkey, a close cooperation with the German tour operator developed Öger Tours that allowed the company to expand in the early 1990s. In April 1992, the fleet was expanded with a Boeing 757-200 and in March 1993 with a Boeing 737-300. To improve the utilization of the aircraft, the Boeing 757 was operated temporarily for other airlines in the wet-lease in the winter months with little demand, including for the Caribbean Airways, based in Barbados. The company sold its DC-8 in 1994 to ABX Air and leased successively two Boeing 727-200 from Yemenia and one McDonnell Douglas DC-10-30 from Skyjet.

In order to be able to continue its transatlantic flights in the winter season 1995/96, Öger Tours and Birgenair entered into a cooperation with the newly founded Dominican company Alas Nacionales in 1995. This Puerto Plata-based company held an Air Operator Certificate, but no aircraft. Alas Nacionales applied for route rights for flights to Germany, which should be operated by Birgenair. In return, the shareholders of the Dominican company were offered the prospect of a bonus of 10 DM per passenger carried. After receiving the flight rights, Birgenair transferred its Boeing 767-200ER to the Dominican Republic, where the aircraft was registered with the partner company on October 25, 1995, with the registration HI-660CA. The aircraft officially leased to Alas Nacionales continued to wear the colors of Turkish society except for a changed lettering. Its charter flights between the Dominican Republic and Germany began a week later. In addition, Birgenair rented its Boeing 757-200 to the Argentine airline STAF in November 1995 and used it on five flight pairs between the Dominican Republic and Buenos Aires. After the lease ended in January 1996, the Boeing 757 was parked in Puerto Plata.

Massive negative publicity about Birgenair and other discount flight organizers in Germany following Birgenair Flight 301 caused a sharp decline in reservations. As a result, Birgenair suspended all flights immediately after the crash. It was originally planned to resume flight operations in the following year. However, the company filed for bankruptcy later that year.

== Fleet ==
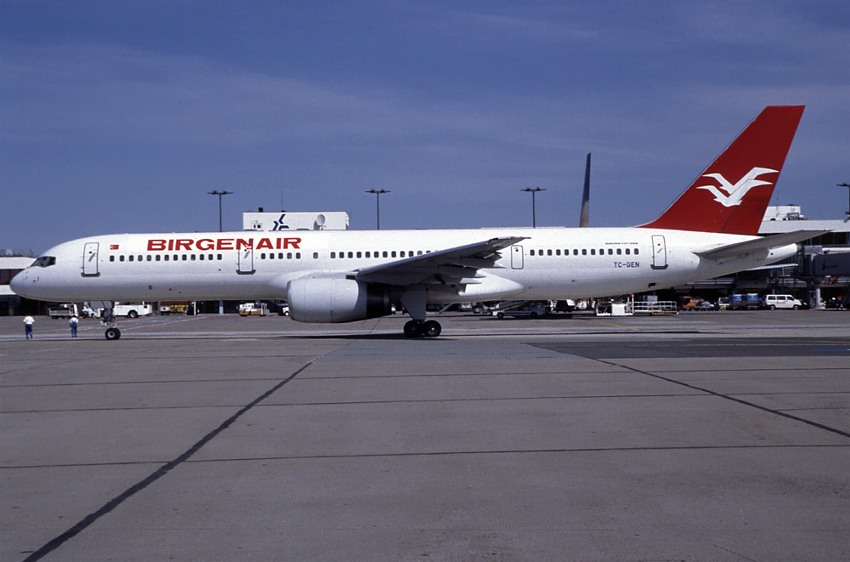
A Birgenair Boeing 757-200 at Berlin Schönefeld Airport in 1995. This aircraft, TC-GEN, would later crash near Puerto Plata in the Dominican Republic as Flight 301.

Over the years, Birgenair operated the following aircraft types:

Birgenair fleet
Aircraft	Total	Introduced	Retired	Notes
Boeing 707-320C	1	1991	1991	Leased from TAROM.
Boeing 727-200	2	1994	1994	Leased from Yemenia.
Boeing 737-300	1	1993	1996	
Boeing 757-200	2	1992	1996	One crashed as Flight 301
Boeing 767-200ER	1	1995	1996	Leased to Alas Nacionales
Douglas DC-8-61	1	1989	1994	
McDonnell Douglas DC-10-30	1	1994	1994	Leased from Skyjet.

== Accidents and incidents ==
On February 6, 1996, Birgenair Flight 301 was bound for Frankfurt, Germany but crashed shortly after take-off from Puerto Plata Airport in the Dominican Republic into Atlantic Ocean 26 kilometres off-shore. All 176 passengers and 13 crew members were killed on impact. It was found that one of the air speed indicators of the Boeing 757-200 was not working properly due to a mud dauber wasp having made a nest in a pitot tube, confusing the pilots about whether the plane's speed was too fast or too slow. The black box, data recorder pointed to error by the captain, because instead of measuring the air speed through one of the working air speed indicators he continued to use the faulty indicator and did not return to the airport. The aircraft was leased due to a problem on the scheduled aircraft for the flight.

== See also ==
- List of defunct airlines of Turkey
