= Sunny Airways =

Thai charter airline

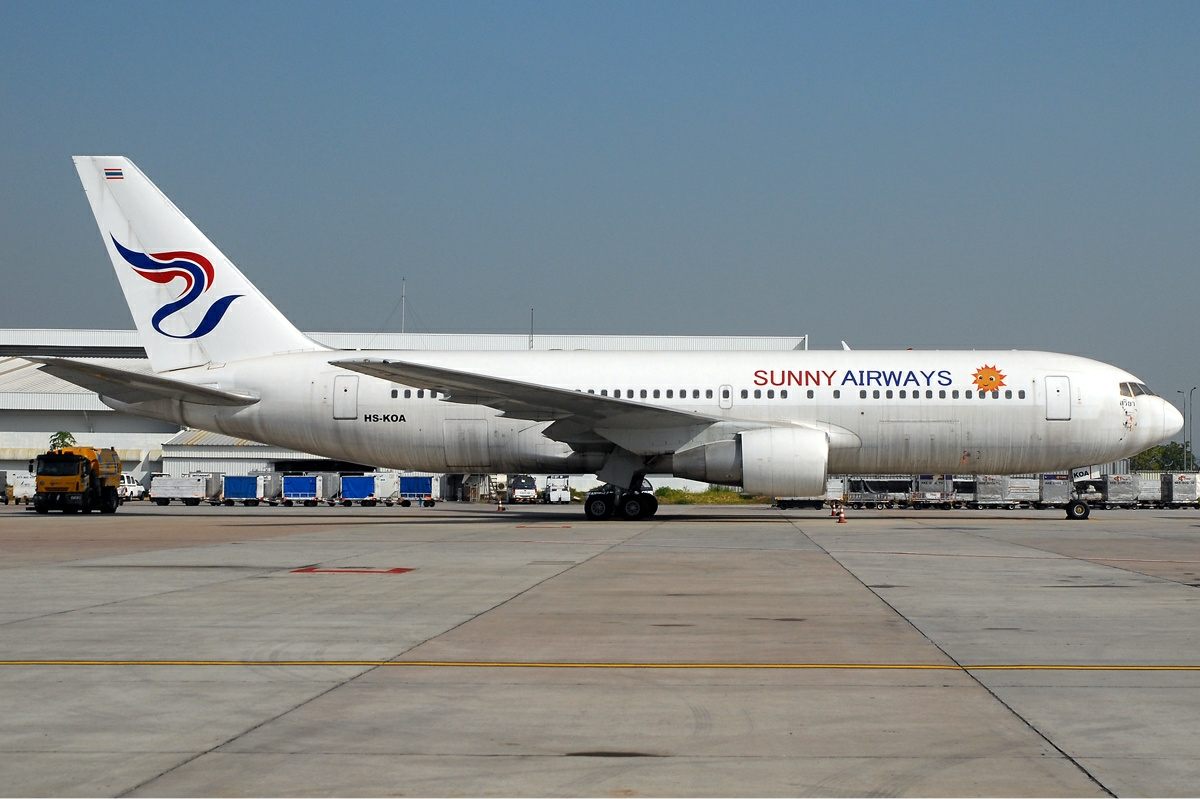
IATA	ICAO	Call sign
2S	SUW	SUNNY
- Founded: 2010
- Commenced operations: September 2011
- Ceased operations: 2012
- Hubs: Suvarnabhumi Airport
- Focus cities: Frankfurt
- Fleet size: 1
- Destinations: 2
- Parent company: Government of Thailand
- Headquarters: Bangkok, Thailand

Sunny Airways Co., Ltd. operating as Sunny Airways, was a short-lived leisure charter airline based in Bangkok, Thailand. Sunny Airways acquired a single Boeing 767-200ER. It began flights in September 2011 and ceased operations in early 2012.

== History ==
Company was established on 30 August 2010, to offer international air transportation services both passenger and cargo. From 16 August 2011, the airline was to start Bangkok-Frankfurt service (routed via Sharjah for refueling), using a Boeing 767 aircraft. The airline intended to capitalize on the growing tourism in Thailand, focusing on the Asian and European markets. Previously the airline was known as Thai Jet Airways.

On January 18, 2012, the airline launched its first inaugural flight between Bangkok, Thailand, and Changchun, Jilin, China. Soon after, the airline ceased operations.
