= Broward County Convention Center =

Convention center in Fort Lauderdale

Coordinates: 26.0985°N 80.1231°W

- Interactive map of Broward County Convention Center
- Address: 1950 Eisenhower Blvd; Fort Lauderdale, FL 33316
- Location: Port Everglades

Construction
- Opened: September 5, 1991
- Construction cost: $48.9 million (1991) $1.3 billion (2025 estimated)

Website
- Venue Website

The Broward County Convention Center or Greater Fort Lauderdale/Broward County Convention Center (sometimes Fort Lauderdale Convention Center) is a convention center located in Fort Lauderdale, Florida, with an adjacent Omni Hotels & Resorts facility. It is located adjacent to the Intracoastal Waterway.

The long-term calendar management for the Convention Center has been the responsibility of The Greater Fort Lauderdale Convention & Visitors Bureau.

== History ==
In January 1985, thirteen sites were considered for a proposed Broward County Convention Center. One of the leading sites was a 25-acre (1,100,000 sq ft; 100,000 m^{2}) parcel that included a 15-acre (650,000 sq ft; 61,000 m^{2}) trailer park near Fort Lauderdale–Hollywood International Airport at U.S. 1 and Northwest 10th Street. By February, the Fort Lauderdale Commission had shortened the list to six official candidates, but the Broward County Tourist Development Council's top choice was a 9.3-acre (410,000 sq ft; 38,000 m^{2}) Port Everglades-owned parcel on Southeast 17th Street near the beach, hotels and other local tourist attractions. In April 1985, Touche Ross filed a preliminary report that stated that Broward County's "resort atmosphere, climate and cost of travel" were favorable toward a dedicated Convention Center, but that its low first-class hotel room count would be a limiting factor to the meetings it could attract. Thus, when Touche Ross submitted an evaluation of 16 potential sites in June 1985, no locations were highly-rated, but the trailer park site was the best alternative. By 1986, development plans included coordinating accommodations to bring major league baseball, basketball and hockey franchises to South Florida. An request for proposal deadline of November 5, 1986 was set. Only 2 of the 5 candidates received support from any of the 20 civic association presidents in January 1987. The final contenders were a site on the beach at East Las Olas Boulevard and Birch Road as well as one at Port Everglades, but homeowners expressed opposition to the former site. The vote to determine the winning plan was set for March 10, 1987 with the Northport plan to develop the port land off the Southeast 17th Street Causeway and Eisenhower Boulevard with a $45 million ($130 million in 2025), 150,000-square-foot convention center plus a $90 million ($255 million in 2025) commercial marketplace the leading contender.

The Broward County Convention Center topped out in July 1990. On Thursday September 5, 1991, the facility had its ribbon cutting ceremony to celebrate the $48.9 ($116 million in 2025) development. The center was completed months (4 or 11, depending on the source) ahead of schedule and $750,000 ($1.77 million in 2025) under budget. At the time, a forthcoming on-site hotel was anticipated. Before it opened, The Broward County Convention Center had over 200 events booked. Its grand opening festivities lasted four days, including a Saturday and Sunday public open house. Broward County Convention Center's first scheduled convention was the September 25–28 Florida Roofing, Sheet Metal and Air Conditioning Contractors Association assembly of its 3,500 members. It also hosted a Fall Home Show two weekends earlier.

Based on the 2013 USA Today rankings for top convention destinations, Ft. Lauderdale ranked 36th (right behind St. Louis) after having lost its largest annual convention in 2012 due to factors that included "lack of meeting space" and the absence of an adjoining hotel after 20 years of hosting the event. In fact, the convention center deficiencies were estimated to cause Broward County to lose $400 million ($544 million in 2025) in business and 960,000 hotel room nights between 2008 and 2016. At the time, the Broward County Convention Center had 600,000 square feet (56,000 m^{2}), including a 200,000 square feet (19,000 m^{2}) exhibit floor. On August 25, 2015, the Broward County Commissioners narrowed the list of potential developers for the renovation of the Convention Center to 5 firms based on financial capacity and capability. Plans for the renovation were announced in April 2017.

Controversially, the Broward County Commissioners decided in 2022 to use $140 million ($154 million in 2025) funds from the American Rescue Plan Act of 2021 for the hotel portion of the convention center despite the fact that the hotel construction was unrelated to public health. The loose objectives of the COVID-19 relief stimulus included helping local governments to "recover from financial distress" and "achieve their own strategies for restoring jobs," according to a United States Treasury spokesperson. The renovation includes roadwork for a bypass road to serve as an alternate to Southeast 17th Street between the Fort Lauderdale beach and U.S. Route 1.

The groundbreaking for the renovation occurred in May 2019. The expansion to a 350,000 square feet (33,000 m^{2}) exhibition floor and addition of an adjacent hotel was initially expected to be completed by 2021, but was two-years behind schedule by 2018 with the construction phase expected to run from 2020 to 2023. Construction was further delayed during the pandemic. The final phase of the renovation had begun by May 2, 2022 with completion expected by the end of 2025 at a total cost of $1.3 billion. On December 13, 2023, the renovation topped out (officially placed the uppermost steel beam) for the expansion building and adjacent 800-room 29-story Omni Fort Lauderdale Hotel.

== See also ==
- List of convention centers in the United States
- List of tallest buildings in Fort Lauderdale
