= Birgenair Flight 301 =

1996 aviation accident in the Atlantic Ocean

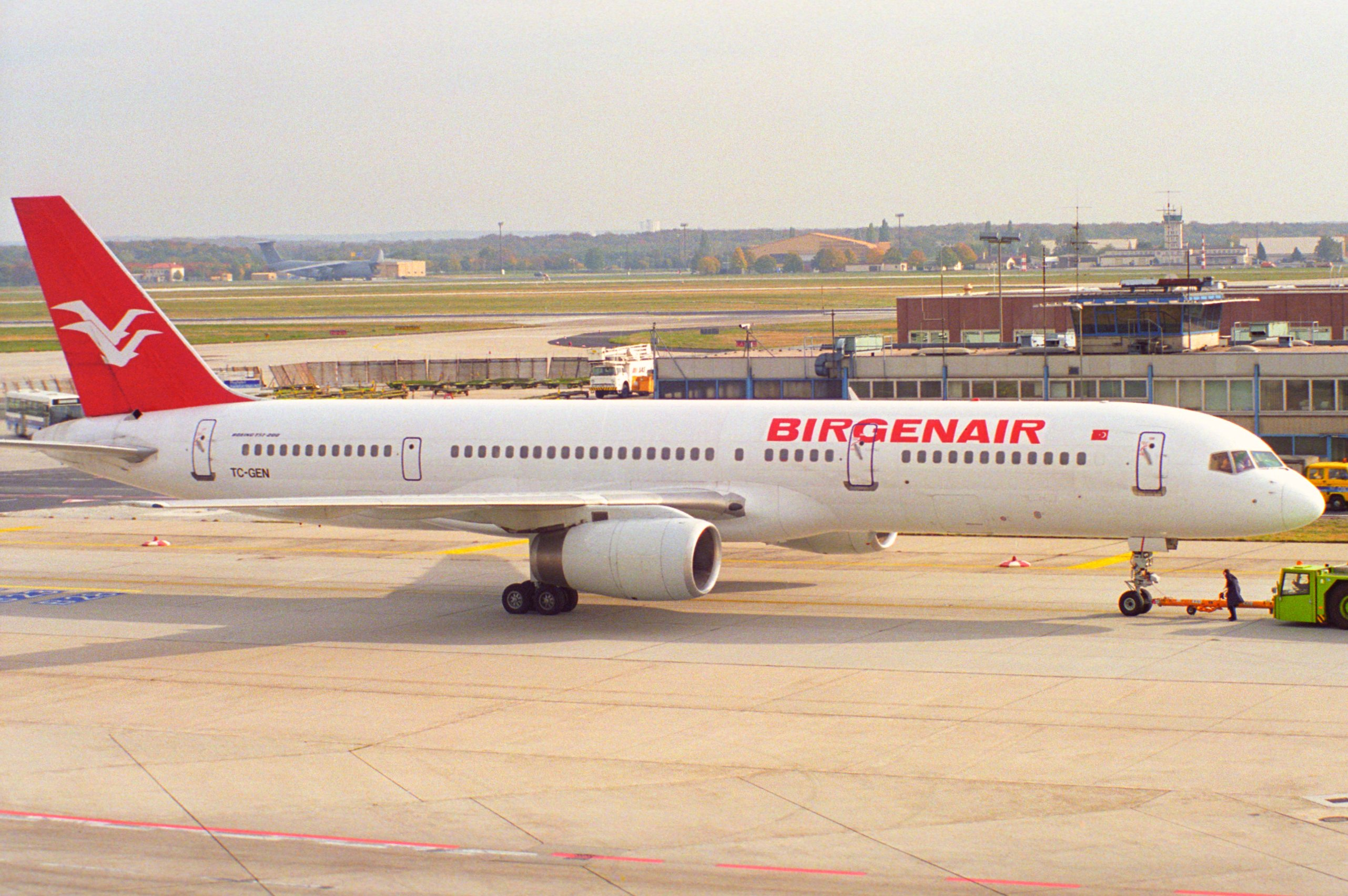
- TC-GEN, the aircraft involved in the accident, pictured in 1994

Accident
- Date: 6 February 1996
- Summary: Stalled and crashed after takeoff due to pitot tube blockage and pilot error
- Site: Atlantic Ocean, 26 km (16 mi; 14 nmi) NE of Gregorio Luperón International Airport Puerto Plata, Dominican Republic; 19°54′50″N 70°24′20″W

Aircraft
- Aircraft type: Boeing 757-225
- Operator: Alas Nacionales on behalf of Birgenair
- IATA flight No.: KT301
- ICAO flight No.: ALW301
- Call sign: ALPHA LIMA WHISKY 301
- Registration: TC-GEN
- Flight origin: Gregorio Luperón International Airport; Puerto Plata, Dominican Republic
- 1st stopover: Gander International Airport; Gander, Newfoundland and Labrador, Canada
- 2nd stopover: Berlin Schönefeld Airport; Berlin, Germany
- Destination: Frankfurt Airport; Frankfurt, Germany
- Occupants: 189
- Passengers: 176
- Crew: 13
- Fatalities: 189
- Survivors: 0

Birgenair Flight 301 was a chartered flight by Turkish-managed Birgenair partner Alas Nacionales from Puerto Plata in the Dominican Republic to Frankfurt, Germany, via Gander, Canada, and Berlin, Germany. On 6 February 1996, the Boeing 757 operating the route crashed shortly after take-off from Puerto Plata's Gregorio Luperón International Airport, killing all 189 people on board. The cause was pilot error after receiving incorrect airspeed information from one of the pitot tubes, which investigators believe was blocked by a wasp nest built inside it. The aircraft had been sitting unused for 20 days, and without pitot tube covers in place for the two days preceding the crash.

Flight 301 is tied with American Airlines Flight 77 as the deadliest aviation incident involving a Boeing 757, having a total of 189 fatalities. Furthermore, Flight 301 is the deadliest aviation accident ever to have occurred in the Dominican Republic.

== Aircraft and crew ==
The aircraft was a 12-year-old Boeing 757-225, registered as TC-GEN, with a manufactured serial number of 22206. The plane's line number was 31. It was powered by two Rolls-Royce RB211-535E4 engines. At the time of the accident, the aircraft had been stationed at Puerto Plata since 12 January 1996, a period of 25 days.

The crew consisted of 11 Turks and 2 Dominicans. The captain was Ahmet Erdem (61), with 24,750 flight hours of experience (including 1,875 hours on the Boeing 757). The first officer was Aykut Gergin (34). He had 3,500 hours of flying experience, though only 71 hours were on the Boeing 757. The relief pilot was Muhlis Evrenesoğlu (51). He had 15,000 flight hours of experience (with 121 of them on the Boeing 757).

== Passengers ==
The passengers consisted mainly of Germans, along with nine Poles including two Members of the Parliament, Zbigniew Gorzelańczyk of the Democratic Left Alliance, and Marek Wielgus of the Nonpartisan Bloc for Support of Reforms (BBWR). Most of the passengers had booked Caribbean package holidays with Öger Tours; Birgenair held 10% of Öger Tours.

Nationality	Passengers	Crew	Total
Germany	167	-	167
Poland	9	-	9
Turkey	-	11	11
Dominican Republic	-	2	2
Total	176	13	189

== Accident ==
National Transportation Safety Board (NTSB) animation of Flight 301's takeoff and accident

During takeoff roll at 23:42 AST (03:42 UTC), the captain found that his airspeed indicator (ASI) was malfunctioning but he chose not to abort the takeoff. The first officer's ASI was functional, though subsequent warning indicators caused the aircrew to question its veracity as well. The aircraft took off normally at 23:42 AST for the first leg of the flight. At 2,500 feet (760 m), the flight switched to main air traffic control and was instructed to climb to flight level 280 (28,000 ft or 8,500 m). The autopilot was engaged 1 minute and 30 seconds into the flight.

Approximately 10 seconds later, two warnings—rudder ratio and Mach airspeed trim—appeared. The crew was at that point becoming increasingly confused because the captain's ASI showed over 300 knots (560 km/h; 350 mph) and increasing, and the first officer's ASI, which was correct, was showing 220 knots (410 km/h; 250 mph) and decreasing.

Then, the captain assumed that both ASI were wrong and decided to check the circuit breakers. When the first circuit breaker was checked, the overspeed warning appeared, as the captain’s ASI, the primary source of the information about airspeed for autopilot, was showing airspeed near 350 knots (650 km/h; 400 mph) and increasing. Then the second circuit breaker was pulled to silence the warning. As the plane was climbing through 4,700 feet (1,400 m), the captain's ASI read 350 knots (650 km/h; 400 mph). The autopilot, which was taking its airspeed information from the same equipment that was providing faulty readings to the captain's ASI, increased the pitch-up attitude and reduced power in order to lower the plane's airspeed. The first officer's ASI was giving a correct reading of 200 knots (370 km/h; 230 mph) and was still decreasing. With all contradictory warnings given by the plane, the confused captain decided to reduce thrust of the plane, believing it was flying too fast.

This action immediately triggered the 757's stick shaker stall alert, warning the confused pilots that the aircraft was flying dangerously slow. Also, the autopilot disengaged. As the plane was close to a stall, its path became unstable and it started descending. Meanwhile, the controller, still unaware of any problems, called the flight, but, as the crew struggled with problems, the first officer said, "Stand by". The first officer and relief pilot, aware of the scale of the problem, were suggesting various methods to recover from the stall, but the confused captain ignored all of them. About 20 seconds before crash, the captain finally attempted to recover from the stall by increasing the plane's thrust to full, but as the aircraft was still in a nose up attitude, the engines were prevented from receiving adequate airflow required to match the increase in thrust. The left engine flamed out, causing the right engine, which was still at full power, to throw the aircraft into a spin. Moments later, the plane inverted. At 23:47 AST, the Ground Proximity Warning System (GPWS) sounded an audible warning, and eight seconds later the plane crashed into the Atlantic Ocean. There were no survivors.

== Investigation and final report ==
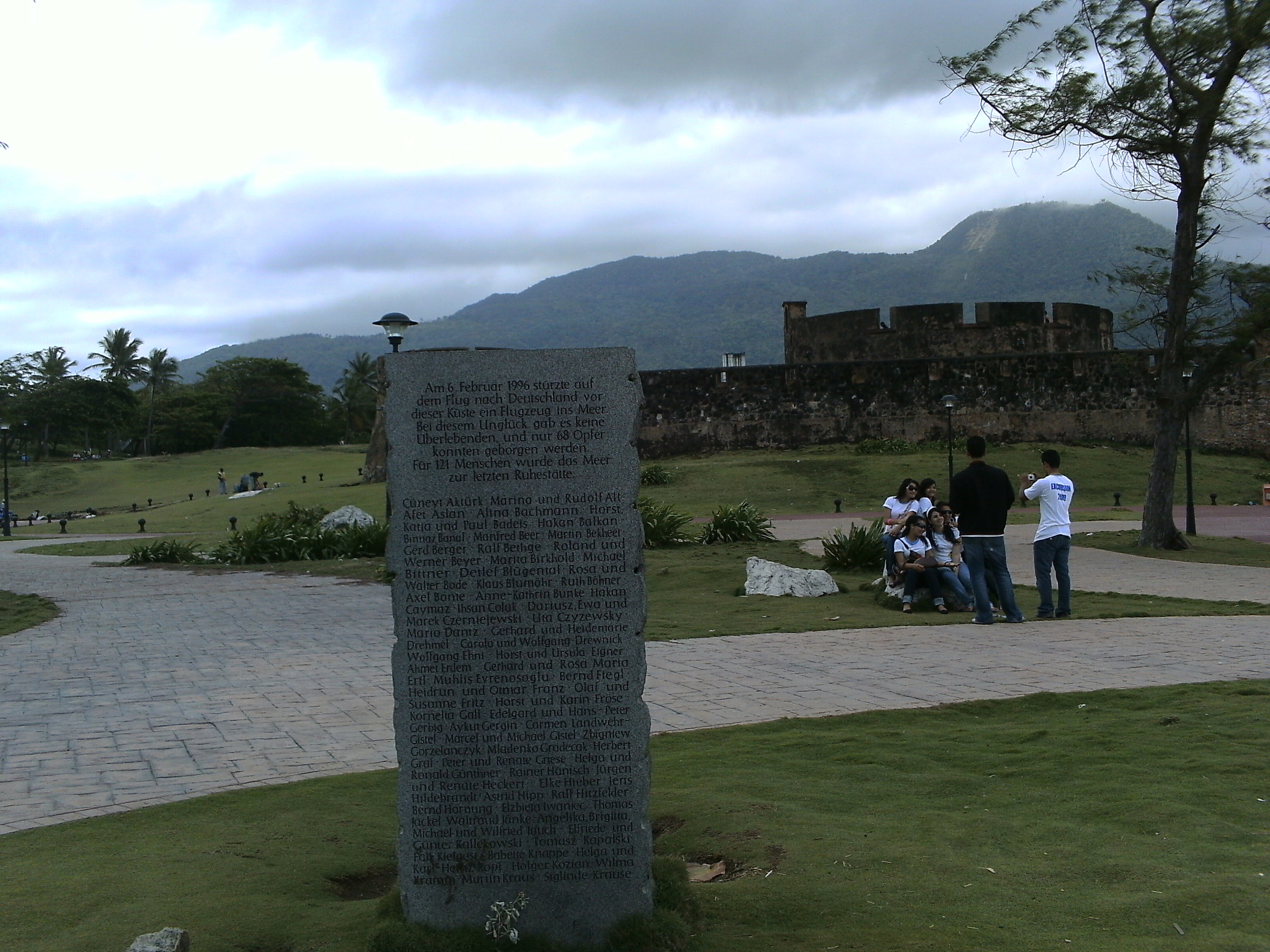
Memorial for the victims of Birgenair Flight 301 in Puerto Plata

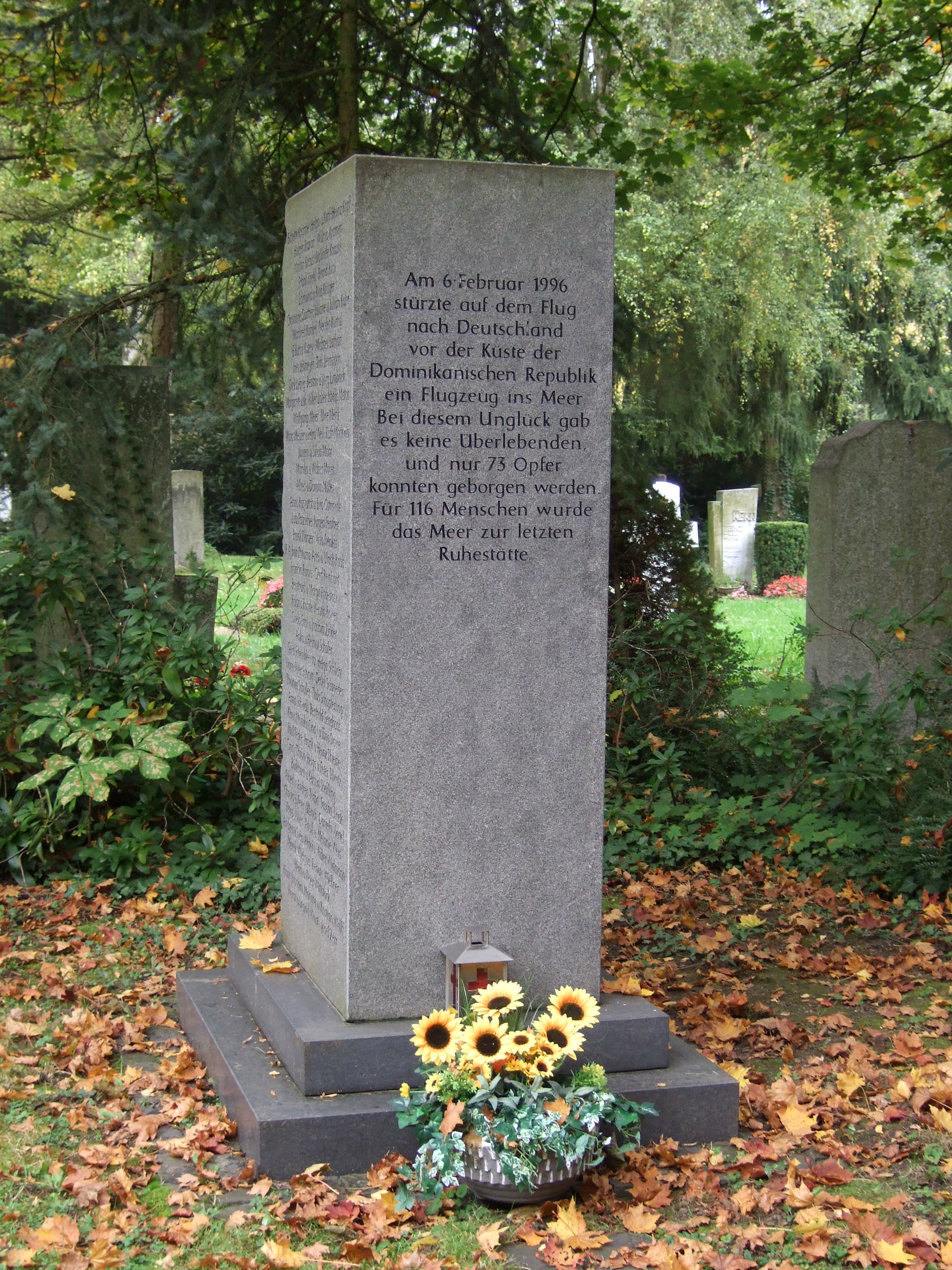
Memorial for the victims of Birgenair Flight 301 in Frankfurt's main cemetery

The Dominican Republic government's General Directorate of Civil Aviation (Spanish: Dirección General de Aeronáutica Civil) (DGAC) investigated the accident and determined the probable cause to be:

The crew's failure to recognize the activation of the stick shaker as a warning of imminent entrance to the stall, and the failure of the crew to execute the procedures for recovery from the onset of loss of control.

Investigations later showed that the plane was actually travelling at 220 knots (410 km/h; 250 mph) at the time of the accident. The investigation concluded that one of the three pitot tubes, used to measure airspeed, was blocked.

None of the pitot tubes were recovered so investigators were unable to determine for certain what caused the blockage. Investigators believe that the most likely culprit was a black and yellow mud dauber (Sceliphron sp.), a type of solitary sphecid wasp well known to Dominican pilots, which makes a cylindrical nest out of mud and tends to establish a nest in artificial, cylindrical structures. According to the final report, section 2.3 – "Aircraft maintenance factors", the aircraft had not flown in 20 days; however, this was not the duration for which pitots remained uncovered, but there was evidently enough time to allow the wasps the opportunity to construct nests in the tubes. According to Cetin Birgen, president and CEO of Birgenair, the pitot covers were removed two days before the accident in order to conduct an engine test run.

The investigation noted a number of other factors and suggested changes. They reconfirmed that the pilots should have followed existing procedures and aborted the takeoff when they found that their airspeed indicators were already in significant disagreement as the plane accelerated down the runway. Results from a number of simulations with experienced pilots found that the combination of the overspeed warning horn and underspeed stick shaker while in flight was an overly confusing contradictory set of messages for many pilots; the FAA issued a directive that pilot training would now include a blocked pitot tube scenario. The FAA research had also revealed that the situation also led to multiple other contradictory warning sounds and warning lights that increased the demands on the pilot to fly the plane. The FAA asked Boeing to change some of those warnings, as well as add a new warning to tell both pilots that their instruments disagree, add the ability for the pilots to silence troublesome alarms, and to modify the system so that the pilots can choose which pitot tube the autopilot uses for airspeed readings.

== Aftermath ==
Shortly after the crash of Flight 301, the airline's overall image and profits became heavily damaged, and some of its planes were grounded at the same time. Birgenair went bankrupt in October of the same year as there were concerns about safety after the accident, causing a decline in passenger numbers. The crash and ensuing negative publicity both contributed to Birgenair's bankruptcy. The crash affected some Turkish charter airlines as well and they closed months after the crash. The crash ended the Tupolev Tu-154 and Yak-42 era in Turkey.

== In popular culture ==
- The events of Flight 301 were featured in "Mixed Signals", a Season 5 (2008) episode of the Canadian TV series Mayday (called Air Emergency and Air Disasters in the U.S. and Air Crash Investigation in the UK and elsewhere around the world). The dramatization was broadcast with the title "The Plane That Wouldn't Talk" in the United Kingdom, Australia and Asia.
- The British television series Survival in the Sky featured the crash in its first episode, titled "Blaming the Pilot" (1996).
- Berlin – Schicksalsjahre einer Stadt (English: Berlin – Fateful Years of the City) Series 4, Episode 6, interviewed the Berlin parents of one of 167 German passengers who died in the flight crash.

== See also ==
- List of accidents and incidents involving commercial aircraft
- Pitot-static system

=== Similar events ===
- Later the same year (1996), Aeroperú Flight 603, also operated with a Boeing 757-200, suffered a similar but far more difficult situation (static ports blocked by tape, rendering all airspeed indicators and pressure altimeters unusable) and crashed in the ocean off Peru, killing all 70 people aboard.
- On June 1, 2009, Air France Flight 447 stalled and crashed over the Atlantic Ocean after pilots mishandled procedures when managing to deal with pitot tubes jammed by ice, causing them to stall the aircraft.
- On 29 October 2018, Lion Air Flight 610 suffered an incorrect airspeed data due to an MCAS design flaw, pilot error, and incorrect maintenance shortly after taking off, crashing into the Java Sea near Jakarta, killing all 189 onboard.
