= Ratioflug Luftfahrtunternehmen =

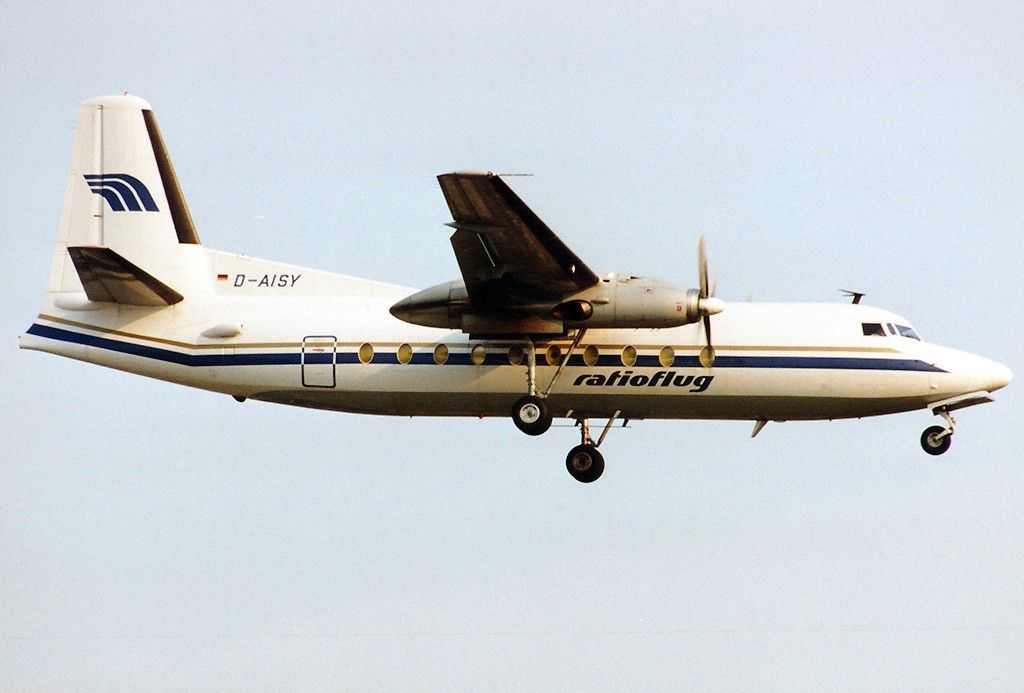
- Fokker 27-600
IATA	ICAO	Call sign
-	RAT	BATMAN
- Founded: November 1981
- Commenced operations: 1982
- Ceased operations: January 1998
- Hubs: Frankfurt Airport
- Parent company: Ratioflug Holding from 1 November 1990
- Key people: Werner Netek Managing Director - Sonja Netek Finance and marketing

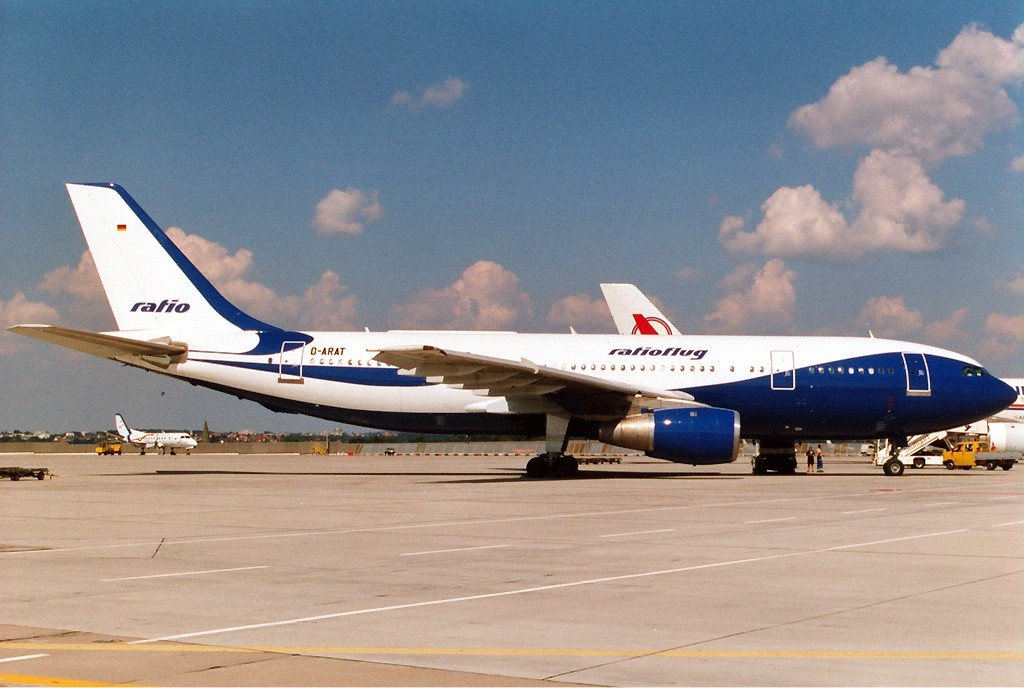
Airbus A300B2

Ratioflug Luftfahrtunternehmen was a German airline based in Cologne

== History ==
Ratioflug was founded in 1981 by Sonja and Werner Netek. In the following year it started operating ad-hoc charter flights from Frankfurt to Brussels, Nuremberg, Munich, Stuttgart, Bern, Zurich, Hamburg and Berlin. The fleet consisted of twin-engine Beechcraft and Cessna aircraft, as well as a few Lear Jets executive jets. Tourist destinations such as Mallorca were also reached. In the late 1980s, it began an all-cargo flight between Munich and Brussels with Fokker 27Fs on Federal Express behalf.

At the beginning of the 1990s, some of the busiest routes became scheduled, namely those from Cologne-Bonn to Basel, Bergamo and Paris. In 1997, an attempt was made to expand operations to include passenger charter flights, for which an Airbus A300 was leased. The initiative was unsuccessful and hastened the demise of the company, which ceased all operations in January of the following year.

== Fleet ==
Ratioflug operated the following aircraft:

- Airbus A300B2
- Beech King Air 200
- Cessna 404
- Cessna 421
- Fokker 27-500
- Fokker 27-600
- Learjet 35
- Learjet 55
