= Fort Lauderdale–Hollywood International Airport =

Airport in Fort Lauderdale, Florida, U.S.

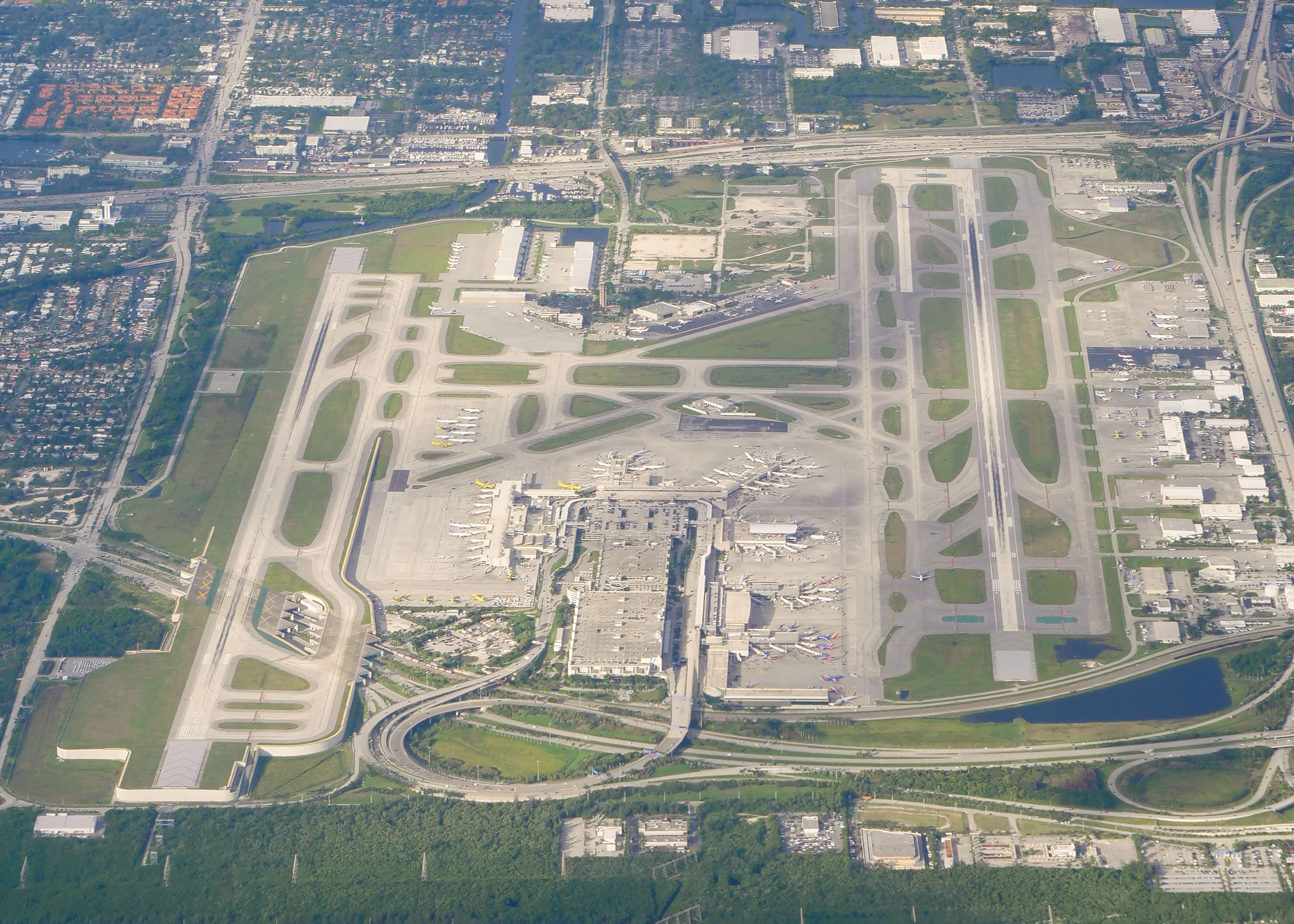
- Aerial view of the airport in 2020
- IATA: FLL; ICAO: KFLL; FAA LID: FLL; WMO: 74783

Summary
- Airport type: Public
- Owner/Operator: Broward County Aviation Department
- Serves: Miami area
- Location: Unincorporated Broward County, Florida, United States
- Opened: May 1, 1929; 97 years ago
- Focus city for: JetBlue
- Operating base for: Allegiant Air
- Elevation AMSL: 65 ft (20 m)
- Coordinates: 26°04′21″N 080°09′10″W
- Website: broward.org/airport

Maps
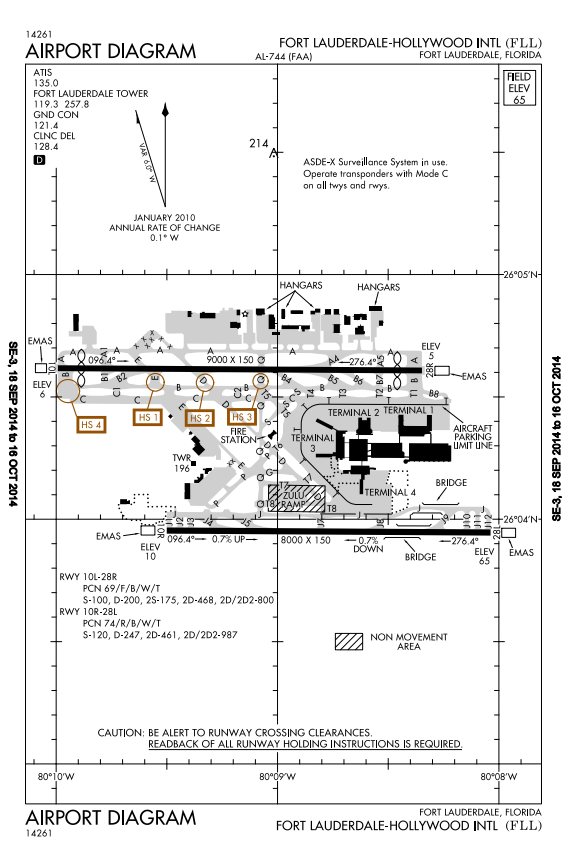
- FAA diagram
- Interactive map of Fort Lauderdale–Hollywood International Airport

Runways
Direction	Length		Surface
Direction	ft	m	Surface
10L/28R	9,000	2,743	Asphalt
10R/28L	8,000	2,438	Concrete

Statistics (2025)
- Total passengers: 32,208,419 ▼8.5%
- Aircraft operations: 302,532
- Total cargo (freight+mail): 105,064.3 tons
- Source: Federal Aviation Administration

Fort Lauderdale–Hollywood International Airport (Note: Also known as Fort Lauderdale Airport, and historically as Merle Fogg Field and Broward County International Airport.) (IATA: FLL, ICAO: KFLL, FAA LID: FLL) is a major public airport located in unincorporated Broward County, Florida, United States, roughly 3 miles (4.8 km) southwest of downtown Fort Lauderdale and 21 miles (34 km) north of Miami. The second busiest of the Miami metropolitan area's commercial airports, it is located off I-595, I-95, Highway 1, SR A1A, and SR 5, and is bounded by the cities of Fort Lauderdale, Hollywood, and Dania Beach.

With over 700 daily flights to 135 domestic and international destinations, the airport has become an intercontinental gateway since the late 1990s, although Miami International Airport still handles most long-haul flights in and out of South Florida. It serves as a primary airport for the Fort Lauderdale and Hollywood areas, and a secondary airport for parts of Miami and areas north of West Palm Beach. The airport is a base for Allegiant Air and JetBlue. It is also the primary South Florida airport for Southwest Airlines. Spirit Airlines had its primary hub at FLL prior to May 2026, when the airline ceased operations.

The airport is classified by the Federal Aviation Administration (FAA) as a "major hub" facility serving commercial air traffic.

== History ==
=== 1926–1959 ===
World War I aviator Merle Fogg purchased an abandoned nine-hole golf course that was destroyed in the 1926 Miami hurricane for $1,200 (about $22,000 in 2025) in 1928. On May 1, 1929, the airport officially opened as Merle Fogg Field, with two criss-cross unpaved runways. At the start of World War II, it was commissioned by the United States Navy and renamed Naval Air Station Fort Lauderdale. The runways were paved, and a control tower was built. The base was initially used for refitting civil airliners for military service before they were ferried across the Atlantic to Europe and West Africa. NAS Fort Lauderdale later became a main training base for Naval Aviators and enlisted naval air crewmen flying the Grumman TBF and TBM Avenger for the U.S. Navy and U.S. Marine Corps aboard aircraft carriers and from expeditionary airfields ashore. NAS Fort Lauderdale was the home base for Flight 19, the five TBM Avengers that disappeared in December 1945, leading in part to the notoriety of the Bermuda Triangle.

NAS Fort Lauderdale closed on October 1, 1946 and was transferred to county control, becoming Broward County International Airport.

Commercial flights began on January 2, 1953 on Mackey Air Transport to Nassau. Domestic flights began in 1958–1959: Northeast Airlines and National Airlines DC-6Bs flew nonstop to New York–Idlewild, and Northeast flew nonstop to Washington–National. In 1959, the airport opened its first permanent terminal building and assumed its current name.

=== 1960–1980 ===
In 1966, the airport averaged 48 airline operations a day; in 1972, it averaged 173 a day.

The Feb 1966 Official Airline Guide shows three nonstop departures to New York–JFK and no other nonstop flights beyond Tampa and Orlando. Five years later, FLL had added nonstop flights to Atlanta, Baltimore, Boston, Buffalo, Chicago–O'Hare, Cleveland, Detroit, Minneapolis/St. Paul, New York–LaGuardia, Newark, Philadelphia, and Pittsburgh. (Northeast's nonstop to Los Angeles had already been dropped.)

By 1974, the airport was served by Braniff International Airways, Delta Air Lines, Eastern Air Lines, National Airlines, Northwest Orient Airlines, Shawnee Airlines and United Airlines. Delta and Eastern were the dominant carriers, with 12 and 14 routes from FLL respectively. By 1979, following deregulation, Air Florida, Bahamasair, Florida Airlines, Mackey International Airlines, Republic Airlines, Trans World Airlines and Western Airlines also served the airport.

=== 1980–2000 ===
Passenger facilities at the airport were expanded in the 1980s. Much of the current terminal complex (present-day Terminals 2, 3, and 4) were built by 1986 to replace the 1959 terminal. Additionally, both U.S. Route 1 and the Florida East Coast Railway at the airport's entrance were shifted further east to make room for the expansion.

Low-cost airline traffic grew in the 1990s, with Southwest opening its base in 1996; Spirit in 1999; and JetBlue in 2000. Spirit Airlines made FLL a hub in 2002. In 2003, JetBlue made FLL a focus city. US Airways also planned a hub at Fort Lauderdale in the mid-2000s as part of its reorganization strategy before its merger with America West Airlines. Eventually, low-cost competition forced several major legacy airlines to cut back service to FLL, with United pulling out of the airport entirely in 2008 and American Airlines moving its New York and Los Angeles services to West Palm Beach in 2013.

=== 2000–2014 ===
In January 2000, South African Airways (SAA) introduced service from Cape Town to Atlanta via Fort Lauderdale on a Boeing 747. The flight from Atlanta to Cape Town operated nonstop. Fort Lauderdale served both as a refueling stop and as a place to pick up passengers. SAA had just started code-sharing with Delta Air Lines, which offered several flights from the airport. Changes to security regulations following the September 11 attacks forced SAA to eliminate the stop.

During the 2005 hurricane season, FLL was affected by Hurricane Katrina and Hurricane Wilma. Katrina struck land in late August as a Category 1 and made landfall on Keating Beach just two miles from the airport (near the border of Broward and Miami–Dade counties) with 80 mph (130 km/h) winds but caused only minor damage; however, the airport was closed for about a 48-hour period. However, when Hurricane Wilma made landfall in October roof damage was reported along with broken windows, damaged jetways, and destroyed canopies. The airport was closed for a period of five days. Hurricane Wilma was a Category 2 when its center passed to the west of FLL. In February 2007, the airport started fees to all users, including private aircraft. FLL is one of the few airports to administer fees to private pilots. A minimum charge of $10 is assessed on landing private aircraft.

In May 2008, Zoom Airlines launched a seasonal link to London's Gatwick Airport via Bermuda. The airline shut down three months later. In May 2010, Condor began a seasonal flight to Frankfurt. Norwegian Air Shuttle introduced routes to Copenhagen and Oslo in November 2013 and to Stockholm the following month. The company expanded its operations in Fort Lauderdale over the next few years. By 2017, Norwegian had established a crew base at the airport and added flights to three more cities in Europe, as well as seasonal service to two Caribbean destinations.

=== 2015–present ===
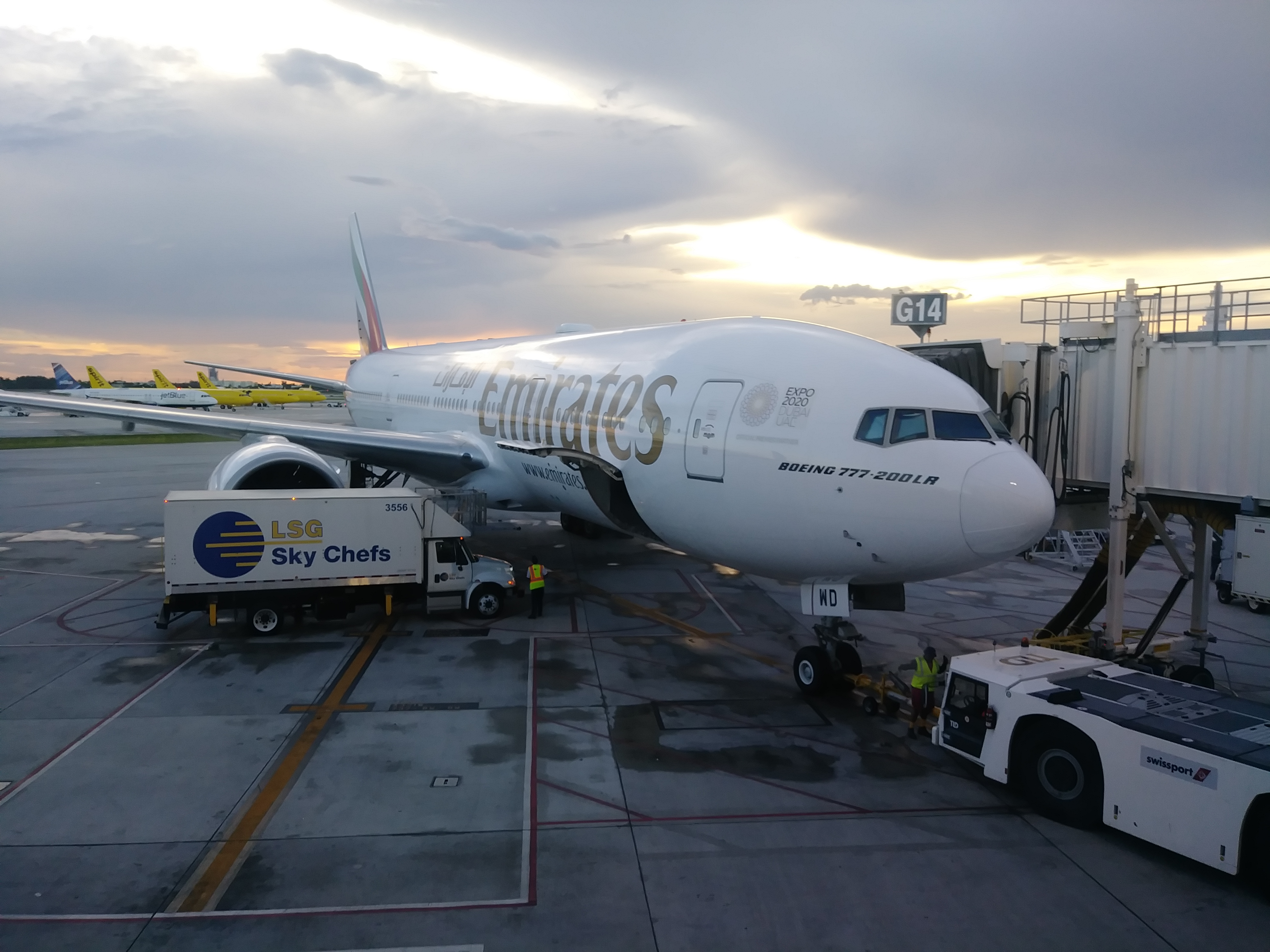
An Emirates jet at the airport in 2018

Emirates launched a flight to Dubai using a Boeing 777-200LR in December 2016. While major airlines tended to prefer flying into Miami, Emirates chose Fort Lauderdale as its gateway to South Florida because of its codeshare agreement with JetBlue and the airport's central location in the region.

On January 6, 2017, a lone gunman opened fire inside Terminal 2 with a semi-automatic handgun, killing five people. The shooter was arrested by a BSO deputy within 85 seconds of when he began shooting. He was sentenced to five consecutive life sentences plus 120 years in prison.

In 2018, NORAD announced that it would be stationing fighter jets at the airport during President Donald Trump's trips to Mar-a-Lago. That same year, the airport had started going through an extensive renovation and expansion project worth approximately $3 billion, adding gates, new parking, stores, and shops. The master plan calls for the construction of an Intermodal center, a people mover, a hotel, an increase in the number of gates from 62 to 95, and widening of the terminal access road.

Emirates ended service to Fort Lauderdale in 2020. In 2021, it began flying to Miami instead, which had more cargo traffic and connecting flights to other countries. In the same year, Norwegian decided to discontinue all of its flights to the United States, leaving the Fort Lauderdale airport without transatlantic service. Norse Atlantic Airways launched a direct flight to Oslo in June 2022.

In April 2023, historic flooding in the area caused severe disruptions at the airport, culminating in a complete closure as rainwater flooded parts of the tarmac and airport property. Norse Atlantic relocated to Miami in pursuit of more passengers and cargo in September 2023. The airline was also flying to London-Gatwick and had a crew base in Fort Lauderdale at the time. In the same month, El Al commenced a seasonal route to Tel Aviv for the Jewish High Holidays. It transitioned to year-round service in April 2024 despite the ongoing Gaza war and an Iranian attack on Israel two days prior. After Miami, Fort Lauderdale was El Al's second destination in South Florida, which has a large Jewish population. In October 2023, one month following El Al's commencement of service at the airport, officials broke ground on FLL's new Terminal 5, which is expected to be completed by mid-2026.

In 2024, Southwest shifted its international flights from Fort Lauderdale to its operating base in Orlando.

In May 2026, Spirit Airlines ceased operations after 34 years.

=== Future ===
Several airport projects are planned or underway as of 2026 and are expected to be completed by the end of the decade, in line with the airport's master plan. These include the construction of airside terminal connections between Terminals 1, 2, and 3, the intermodal center, Terminal 5, and an automated people mover connecting the terminals, garages, and the intermodal center. Additionally, the Palm Garage is to be reconstructed, with an on-site hotel & conference center built adjacent to the reconstructed garage, while Terminal 3 will be rebuilt & expanded and a station on the proposed Broward Commuter Rail section of the FEC Coastal Link is established.

An elevated light rail service known as PREMO Light Rail linking the airport, the Broward County Convention Center, and Port Everglades is also proposed. As of 2024, this first phase of the light rail system is anticipated to be completed by 2028.

== Facilities ==
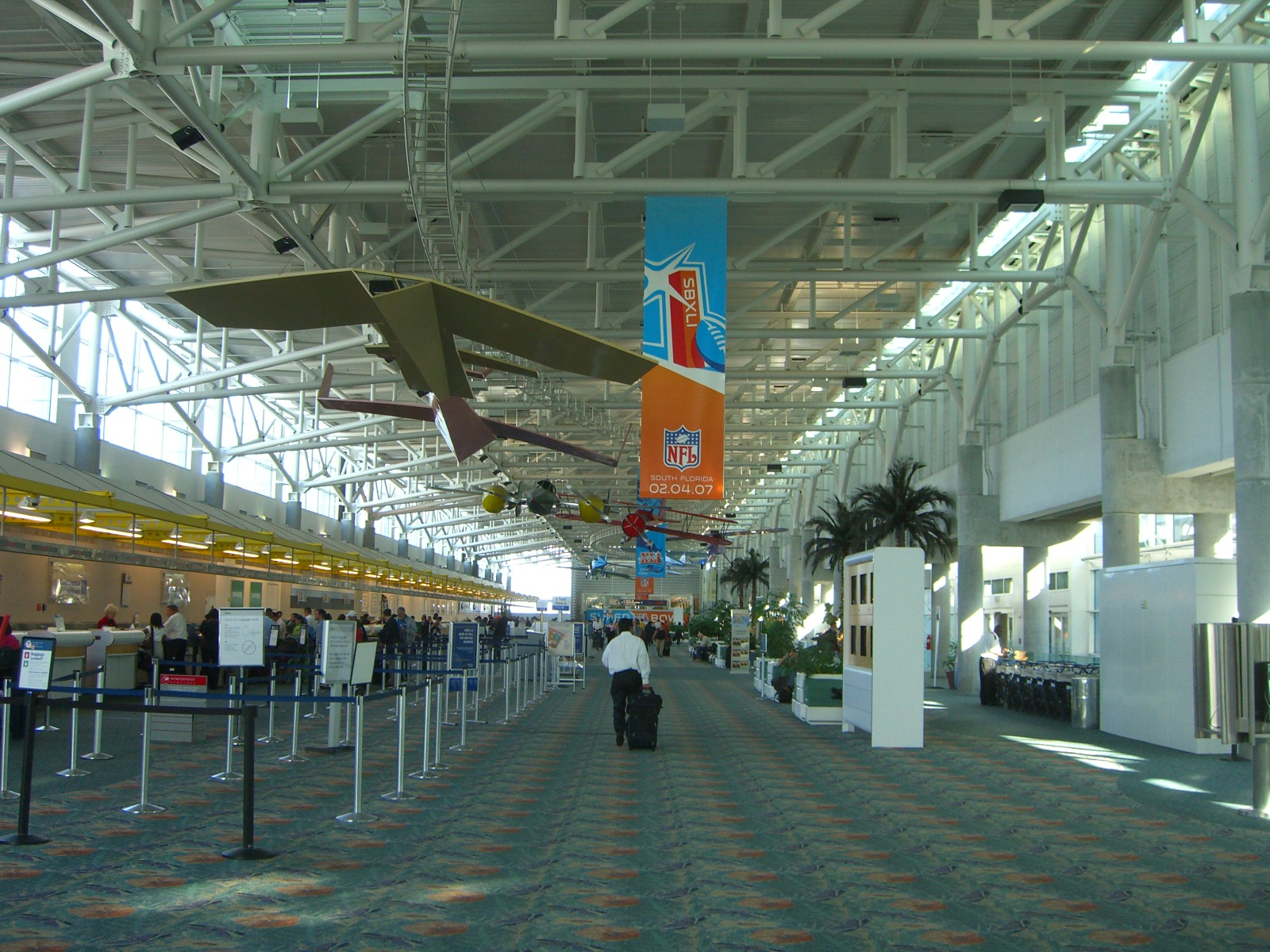
Terminal 1's check-in area in 2007

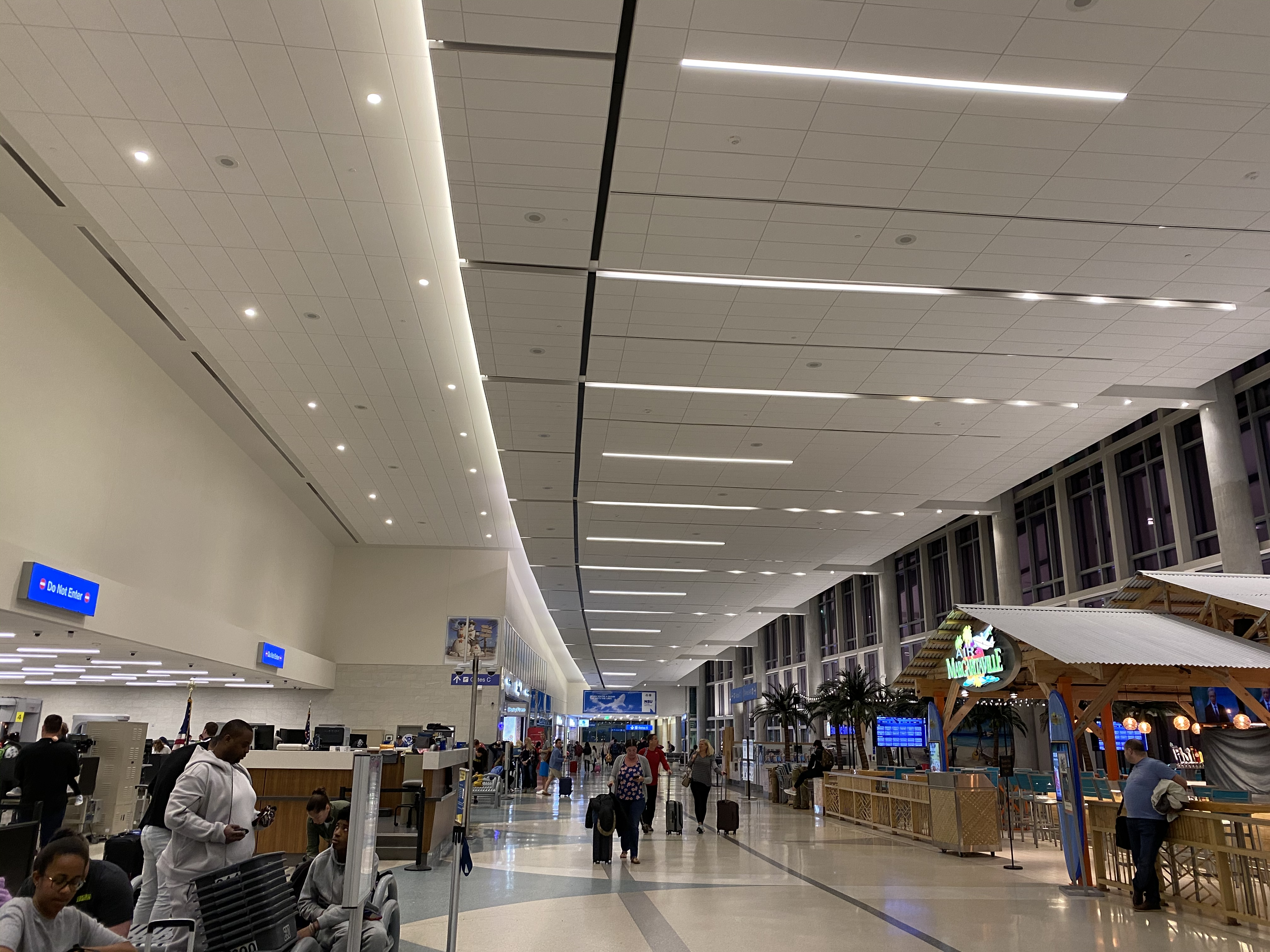
Terminal 1 hallway, just past the security checkpoint

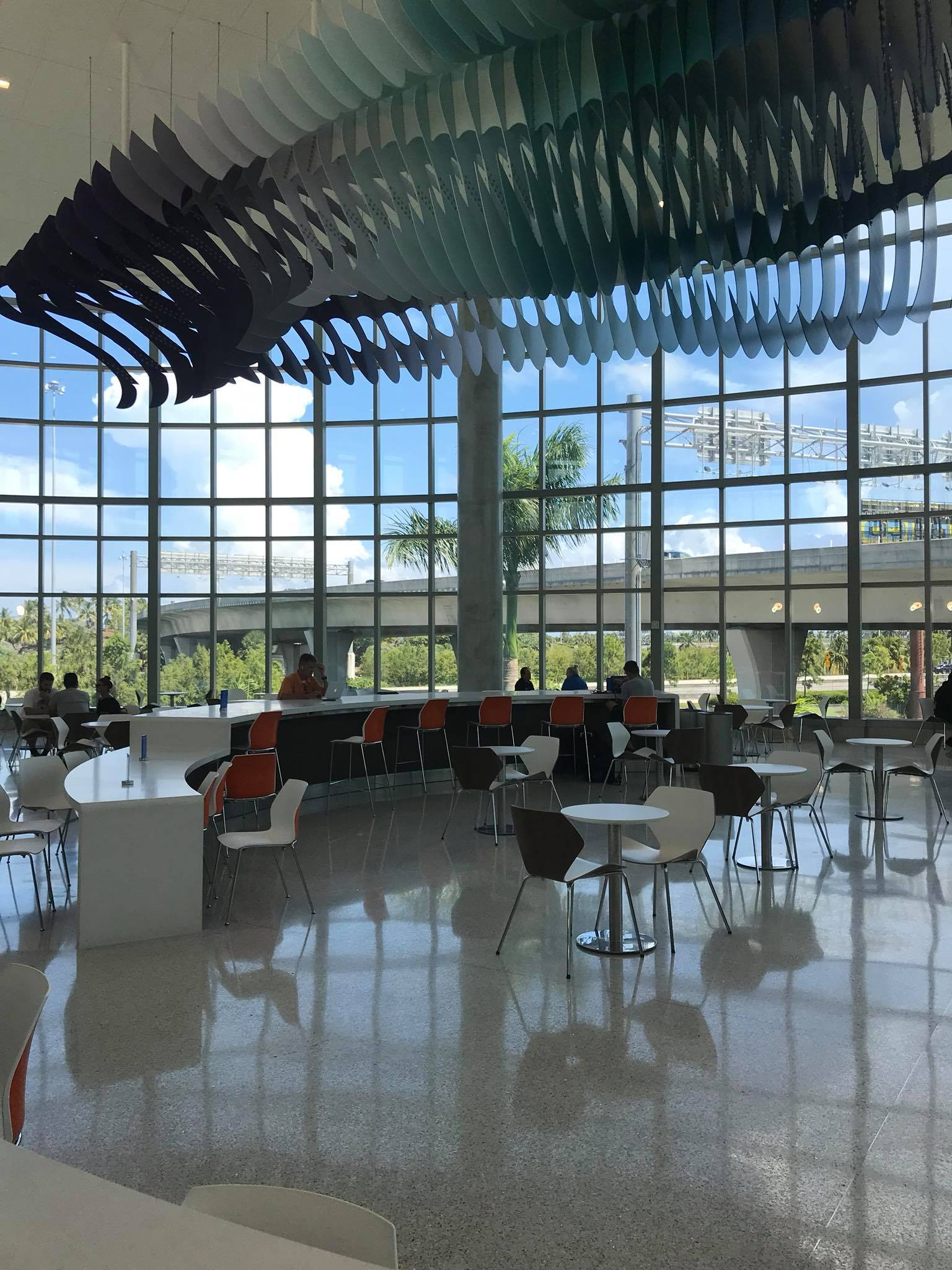
A waiting area in Terminal 1, Concourse A; Terminal Drive is visible in the background

Fort Lauderdale–Hollywood International Airport, located in an unincorporated area, covers 1,380 acres (558 ha) and has two runways:

- 10L/28R: 9,000 x 150 ft (2,743 x 46 m), asphalt
- 10R/28L: 8,000 x 150 ft (2,438 x 46 m), concrete (extension completed September 18, 2014)

The former crosswind runway, 13/31, was closed and decommissioned in 2013 as part of the Airport Expansion Program, which also extended runway 10R/28L to its current length.

Silver Airways previously had its headquarters in Suite 201 of the 1100 Lee Wagener Blvd building. When Chalk's International Airlines existed, its headquarters was on the grounds of the airport in an unincorporated area. Spirit Airlines used to have its headquarters in nearby Dania Beach, using FLL as their primary hub.

=== Terminals ===
Fort Lauderdale–Hollywood International Airport operates four terminals with 67 total gates, with another terminal under construction as of 2024. Terminal 1 was built in phases between 2001 and 2003 and was expanded in 2017. The other three terminals were constructed in the mid 1980s and designed by Reynolds, Smith & Hills as part of a $263 million construction project.

As of 2025, Terminal 5 is under construction and is expected to be completed by 2030.

==== Terminal 1 ====
Terminal 1, previously known as the Yellow Terminal, contains 24 gates on 3 concourses.

- Concourse A contains 7 gates (Gates A1–A7)
- Concourse B contains 8 gates (Gates B2–B9 (Note: Gate B1 was removed during the construction of Concourse A))
- Concourse C contains 9 gates (Gates C1–C9)

Terminal 1 is served by Alaska Airlines, Allegiant Air, Avianca, Bahamasair, Breeze, Caribbean Airlines, Copa Airlines, Frontier Airlines, Southwest Airlines, United Airlines, and Western Air. United Airlines operates a United Club in Concourse C, which originally opened with the new Terminal in May 2001 as a Continental Airlines Presidents Club before United merged with Continental Airlines.

Terminal 1 was designed by Hellmuth, Obata and Kassabaum and Cartaya Associates. The first phase of Terminal 1 opened in April 2001 which included Concourse C. The second phase, which included Concourse B, opened in 2003. Terminal 1 received a $300 million renovation from late 2015 to June 2017 which included a single TSA security checkpoint and concession hall. Concourse A was also built during this renovation which also included a U.S. Customs and Border Protection facility for international flights.

==== Terminal 2 ====
Terminal 2, previously known as the Red Terminal, contains Concourse D and 9 gates (Gates D1–D9). Air Canada and Delta Air Lines operate at Terminal 2. Due to construction in Terminal 1, WestJet currently operates from Terminal 2 as well. Delta Air Lines operates a Sky Club here.

Terminal 2 opened in November 1986 and it was originally known as the North Terminal. By 1989, it was designated as Terminal 1 (with its concourse designated as B). The terminal was renamed Terminal 2 in 1999 when the 1980s terminals and concourses were renamed in preparation for the construction of the current Terminal 1. Terminal 2 was renovated in 2018, which included the expansion of the check-in area, renovations to security screening facilities, new ceilings, flooring, and the inclusion of more concessions, along with the modernization of the Sky Club.

==== Terminal 3 ====
Terminal 3, previously known as the Purple Terminal, contains 20 gates on 2 concourses.

- Concourse E contains 10 gates (Gates E1–E10)
- Concourse F contains 10 gates (Gates F1–F10)

Terminal 3 functions as the operating base for JetBlue, which they use for their domestic flights. Terminal 3 is also used by American Airlines, Avelo Airlines, Azul Brazilian Airlines, Porter Airlines, and Sun Country Airlines. It is also connected to Terminal 4 via a newly built walkway.

Terminal 3 opened in March 1986 and it was originally known as the West Terminal. It was later known as Terminal 2 (with its concourses designated as C and D) until the terminals were renumbered in 1999.

==== Terminal 4 ====
Terminal 4, previously known as the Green Terminal, contains Concourse G with 14 gates (Gates G1–G14). It is primarily used for international flights with JetBlue's international flights also operating from Terminal 4. Terminal 4 is also served by Air Transat, Flair Airlines, and Sunrise Airways.

Terminal 4 opened in August 1985 and it was initially known as the South Terminal. Service was inaugurated by a Concorde on opening day. The terminal originally contained a 10-gate concourse that was perpendicular to the terminal. It also included a ground-level wing on the east end known as the Commuter Terminal for airlines operating smaller propeller aircraft such as Air Sunshine and Cape Air. The terminal was later known as Terminal 3 (with its concourse designated as F). The terminal was renamed Terminal 4 and its concourse was named Concourse H when the terminals were renamed in 1999. Terminal 4 was renovated in the 2010s with the first phase of Concourse G opening in July 2015. Concourse G was complete by 2017 and the perpendicular Concourse H was then demolished. 11 of the 14 gates in Concourse G are international/domestic capable, and one arrival area for bussing operations. Terminal 4 used to be the primary hub of the defunct Spirit Airlines.

==== Future Terminal 5 ====
On October 9, 2023, Broward County officials held a groundbreaking ceremony for the airport's new Terminal 5 (T5). The $404 million, 230,000-square-foot facility will feature five new domestic gates, check-in and baggage areas, security screening, and a variety of retail and food services. T5 will connect to T4 and the Cypress parking garage through pedestrian bridges. The terminal is set for completion by 2030.

=== Ground transportation ===
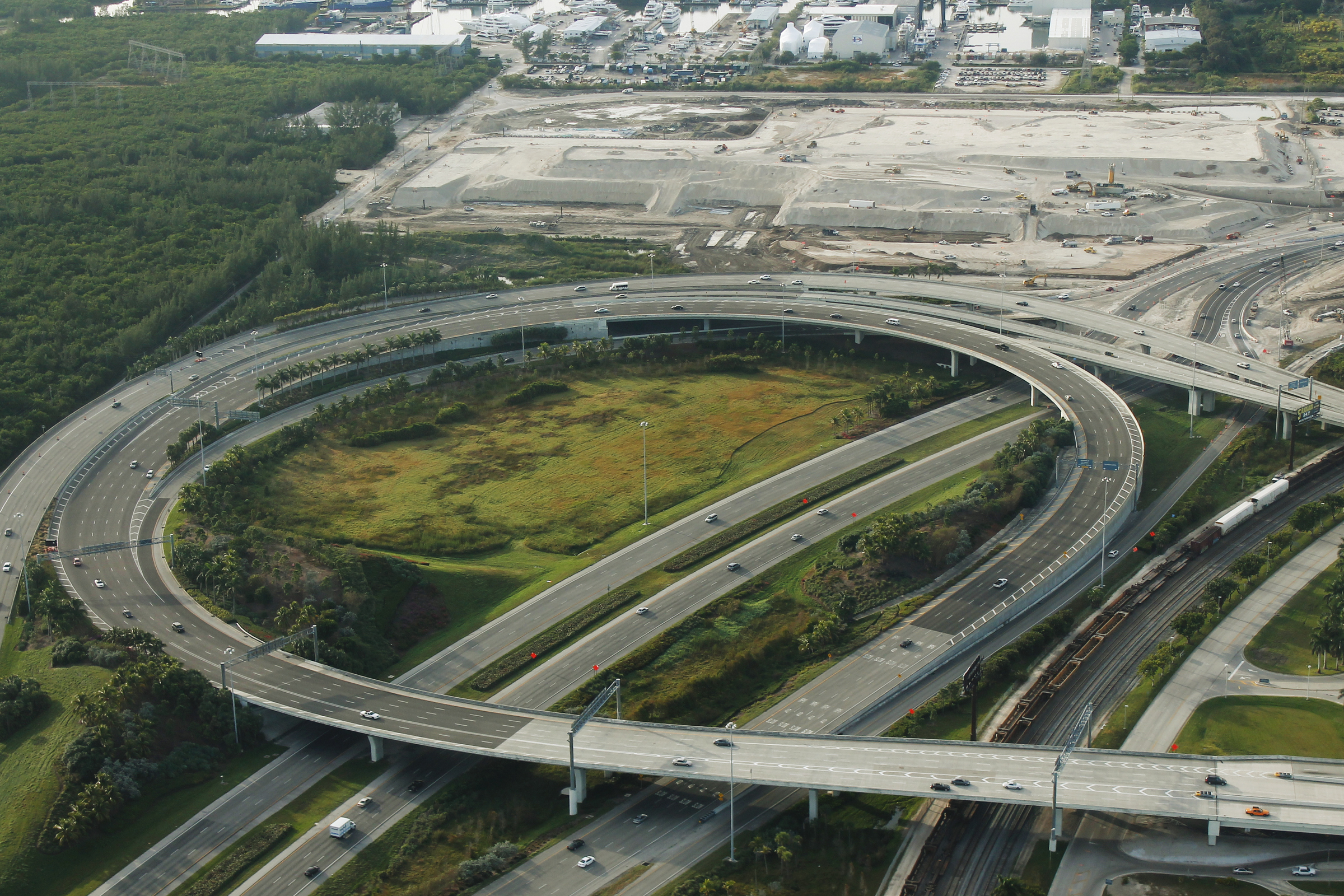
A view of the Terminal Drive loop leading into the airport

Fort Lauderdale–Hollywood International Airport is near the Fort Lauderdale/Hollywood International Airport at Dania Beach train station served by Tri-Rail commuter trains – as well as the Fort Lauderdale station serving Brightline. Both Tri-Rail and Brightline provides a shuttle bus service from their respective stations to three locations at the airport, all on the lower level: the west end of terminal 1, between terminals 2 & 3, and between terminals 3 & 4. The shuttles operate seven days a week; the Tri-Rail shuttle is free for Tri-Rail customers.

The terminals are accessible by Highway 1. Other major roads that border the airport include SR 818, I-95, and I-595. U.S. Route 1 includes an underpass under Runway 10R/28L.

Ride-sharing companies can also be used to and from the airport in designated pickup and drop-off places found between Terminals 1 & 2 and Terminals 3 & 4.

The airport also offers airport parking and operates a consolidated rental car facility which can be accessed directly Terminal 1 and from the other terminals by a free shuttle bus service.

FLL is served by Broward County Transit bus Route 1 which offers connecting service through the Broward Central Terminal in downtown Fort Lauderdale, and also serves to Aventura Mall in Aventura, Florida, in Miami-Dade County.

=== Art ===
Internationally known artist and sculptor Duane Hanson created an installation for his work Vendor with Walkman at the Departure Level of Terminal 3 at the airport. Hanson, who retired and died in nearby Boca Raton, created a seated middle-aged man wearing a red T-shirt, blue pants, and baseball cap, and listening to a walkman during a break. The installation accessories give additional clues to the narrative of the artwork: toy airplane, various signs, and announcements for the shop, janitorial supplies. The artwork has since been moved to Terminal 1 Arrival Level.

== Airlines and destinations ==
=== Passenger ===
Airlines	Destinations	Refs
Aeroméxico	Mexico City (begins January 14, 2027)	
Air Canada	Montréal–Trudeau; Seasonal: Toronto–Pearson	
Air Canada Rouge	Montréal–Trudeau, Toronto–Pearson; Seasonal: Ottawa, Québec City	
Air Transat	Seasonal: Québec City	
Alaska Airlines	Seattle/Tacoma; Seasonal: Portland (OR), San Diego	
Allegiant Air	Akron/Canton, Albany, Allentown, Appleton,Asheville, Atlantic City, Bangor, Belleville/St. Louis, Boston, Cedar Rapids/Iowa City, Charlotte/Concord, Chattanooga, Chicago/Rockford, Cincinnati, Columbus–Rickenbacker, Des Moines, Fayetteville/Bentonville, Fort Wayne, Grand Rapids, Greenville/Spartanburg, Harrisburg, Huntington, Huntsville, Indianapolis, Kansas City, Knoxville, Lexington, Louisville, Memphis, Nashville, Newburgh, Omaha, Peoria, Pittsburgh, Plattsburgh, Rochester (NY), Savannah, Sioux Falls, South Bend, Syracuse, Traverse City, Trenton; Seasonal: Portsmouth (begins February 20, 2027), Providence (begins February 13, 2027)	
American Airlines	Charlotte, Chicago–O'Hare, Dallas/Fort Worth, Philadelphia, Phoenix–Sky Harbor, Washington–National; Seasonal: New York–LaGuardia	
Avelo Airlines	Dallas/McKinney, New Haven, Wilmington (DE)	
Avianca	Barranquilla, Bogotá, Calí, Medellín–JMC	
Azul Brazilian Airlines	Belém, Campinas	
Bahamasair	Freeport, Nassau; Seasonal: George Town, North Eleuthera	
BermudAir	Seasonal: Belize City, Bermuda (resumes December 20, 2026), Providenciales	
Breeze Airways	Akron/Canton, Birmingham (AL), Charleston (SC), Dayton, Greenville/Spartanburg, Huntsville, Jacksonville (FL), Myrtle Beach, Pensacola, Salisbury, Savannah, Tallahassee, Tampa, Wilkes-Barre/Scranton, Wilmington (NC)	
Caribbean Airlines	Port of Spain	
Contour Airlines	Macon/Warner Robins (GA)	
Copa Airlines	Panama City–Tocumen	
Delta Air Lines	Atlanta, Boston, Cincinnati, Detroit, Los Angeles, Minneapolis/St. Paul, New York–JFK, New York–LaGuardia, Raleigh/Durham, Salt Lake City, Seattle/Tacoma	
Flair Airlines	Toronto–Pearson	
Frontier Airlines	Atlanta, Baltimore, Charlotte, Chicago–O'Hare , Cincinnati, Cleveland, Columbus–Glenn, Dallas/Fort Worth, Denver, Detroit, Indianapolis, Houston–Intercontinental, Philadelphia, Raleigh/Durham, San Juan, Washington–Dulles	
JetBlue	Aguadilla, Albany, Aruba, Atlanta, Austin, Baltimore, Barranquilla, Boston, Buffalo, Cali, Cancún, Cartagena, Charleston (SC), Charlotte, Chicago–O'Hare, Cleveland, Columbus–Glenn, Dallas/Fort Worth, Detroit, Grand Cayman (resumes February 23, 2027), Guatemala City, Guayaquil, Hartford, Houston–Intercontinental, Indianapolis, Jacksonville (FL), Kingston–Norman Manley, Las Vegas, Liberia (CR), Long Island/Islip, Los Angeles, Medellín–JMC, Montego Bay, Nashville, Nassau, New Orleans, New York–JFK, New York–LaGuardia, Newark, Norfolk, Orlando, Philadelphia, Pittsburgh, Ponce, Port-au-Prince (suspended), Providence, Punta Cana, Raleigh/Durham, Richmond, San Diego, San Francisco, San Pedro Sula, San José (CR), San Juan, Santiago de los Caballeros, Santo Domingo–Las Américas, St. Maarten, Syracuse, Tampa, Tegucigalpa/Comayagua (begins February 25, 2027), Washington–National, White Plains, Worcester; Seasonal: Hayden/Steamboat Springs, Phoenix–Sky Harbor	
Porter Airlines	Ottawa, Toronto–Pearson; Seasonal: Halifax (begins December 17, 2026), Hamilton (ON), London (ON), Montréal–Trudeau	
Southwest Airlines	Austin, Baltimore, Chicago–Midway, Columbus–Glenn, Dallas–Love, Denver, Houston–Hobby, Indianapolis, Kansas City, Milwaukee, Nashville, New Orleans, Orlando, Pittsburgh, Raleigh/Durham, San Juan, St. Louis, Tampa, Washington–National; Seasonal: Albany, Buffalo, Hartford, Las Vegas, Louisville, Omaha, Phoenix–Sky Harbor, Providence, San Antonio, San Diego	
Sun Country Airlines	Seasonal: Minneapolis/St. Paul	
Sunrise Airways	Cap-Haïtien	
United Airlines	Chicago–O'Hare, Cleveland, Denver, Houston–Intercontinental, Los Angeles, Newark, San Francisco, Washington–Dulles	
Western Air	Freeport, Nassau	
WestJet	Toronto–Pearson; Seasonal: Calgary, Winnipeg	

=== Cargo ===
Airlines	Destinations
FedEx Express	Atlanta, Dallas/Fort Worth, Fort Worth/Alliance, Greensboro, Indianapolis, Jacksonville (FL), Memphis, Newark, Orlando
FedEx Feeder	Key West, Marathon
UPS Airlines	Louisville, Miami

== Statistics ==
=== Top destinations ===
Busiest domestic routes from FLL (September 2025 – August 2026)
Rank	City	Passengers	Airlines
1	Atlanta, Georgia	1,160,980	Delta, Frontier, JetBlue, Spirit
2	New York–LaGuardia, New York	686,985	American, Delta, JetBlue, Spirit
3	Newark, New Jersey	675,171	JetBlue, Spirit, United
4	New York–JFK, New York	540,486	Delta, JetBlue
5	Chicago–O'Hare, Illinois	540,146	American, Frontier, Spirit, United
6	Philadelphia, Pennsylvania	497,308	American, Frontier, JetBlue, Spirit
7	Dallas/Fort Worth, Texas	480,469	American, Frontier, JetBlue, Spirit
8	Charlotte, North Carolina	445,913	American, Frontier, Spirit
9	Boston, Massachusetts	442,159	Delta, JetBlue, Spirit
10	Detroit, Michigan	428,274	Delta, Frontier, Spirit

Busiest international routes from FLL (September 2025 – August 2026)
Rank	City	Passengers	Airlines
1	Toronto–Pearson, Canada	669,285	Air Canada, Air Canada Rouge, Flair, Porter, WestJet
2	Montréal–Trudeau, Canada	488,471	Air Canada, Air Canada Rouge, Air Transat, Porter
3	Kingston, Jamaica	321,030	Caribbean, JetBlue, Spirit
4	Medellín, Colombia	288,628	Avianca, JetBlue, Spirit
5	Nassau, Bahamas	250,672	JetBlue, Western Air
6	Cancún, Mexico	248,824	JetBlue, Spirit
7	Montego Bay, Jamaica	239,533	Caribbean, JetBlue, Spirit
8	Santo Domingo, Dominican Republic	230,913	JetBlue, Spirit
9	Bogotá, Colombia	212,825	Avianca, Spirit
10	Punta Cana, Dominican Republic	211,989	JetBlue, Spirit

=== Airline market share ===
Carrier shares (September 2025 – August 2026)
1. JetBlue, 8,166,005 (26.3%)
2. Spirit, 5,697,713 (18.4%)
3. Delta, 4,065,151 (13.1%)
4. Southwest, 2,910,935 (9.40%)
5. United, 2,508,987 (8.30%)
6. Other, 7,600,000 (24.5%)

Top airlines at FLL (September 2025 – August 2026)
Rank	Airline	Passengers	Percent of market share
1	JetBlue Airways	8,166,005	26.3%
2	Spirit Airlines	5,697,713	18.4%
3	Delta Air Lines	4,065,151	13.1%
4	Southwest	2,910,935	9.4%
5	United Airlines	2,578,014	8.3%
6	Other	7,600,000	24.5%

=== Annual traffic ===
FLL Annual passenger traffic (enplaned + deplaned), 1957–present
Year	Passengers	Year	Passengers	Year	Passengers	Year	Passengers
1957	41,335	1975	3,698,896	1993	9,172,308	2011	23,349,835
1958	48,568	1976	4,101,438	1994	10,571,364	2012	23,569,103
1959	134,773	1977	4,397,858	1995	9,850,713	2013	23,559,779
1960	195,907	1978	5,735,800	1996	11,163,852	2014	24,648,306
1961	213,289	1979	6,221,150	1997	12,277,411	2015	26,941,671
1962	209,629	1980	6,024,879	1998	12,453,874	2016	29,205,002
1963	205,592	1981	5,742,071	1999	13,990,692	2017	32,511,053
1964	185,058	1982	5,845,575	2000	15,860,004	2018	35,963,370
1965	252,040	1983	5,700,612	2001	16,407,927	2019	36,747,622
1966	317,721	1984	6,433,464	2002	17,037,261	2020	16,484,132
1967	495,279	1985	6,752,967	2003	17,938,046	2021	28,076,808
1968	806,679	1986	7,933,054	2004	20,819,292	2022	31,686,404
1969	1,301,668	1987	8,616,609	2005	22,390,285	2023	35,115,485
1970	1,623,473	1988	8,576,814	2006	21,369,787	2024	35,208,611
1971	1,867,877	1989	8,506,353	2007	22,681,903	2025	32,208,419
1972	2,785,744	1990	9,098,124	2008	22,621,698	2026	
1973	3,181,186	1991	8,045,712	2009	21,060,144	2027	
1974	3,438,430	1992	8,344,866	2010	22,412,627	2028	

- From 1957 through 2025, 872,435,278 passengers (domestic+international, enplaned+deplaned) have passed through Fort Lauderdale-Hollywood Int'l Airport, an annual average of 12,643,990 passengers per year.

== Accidents and incidents ==
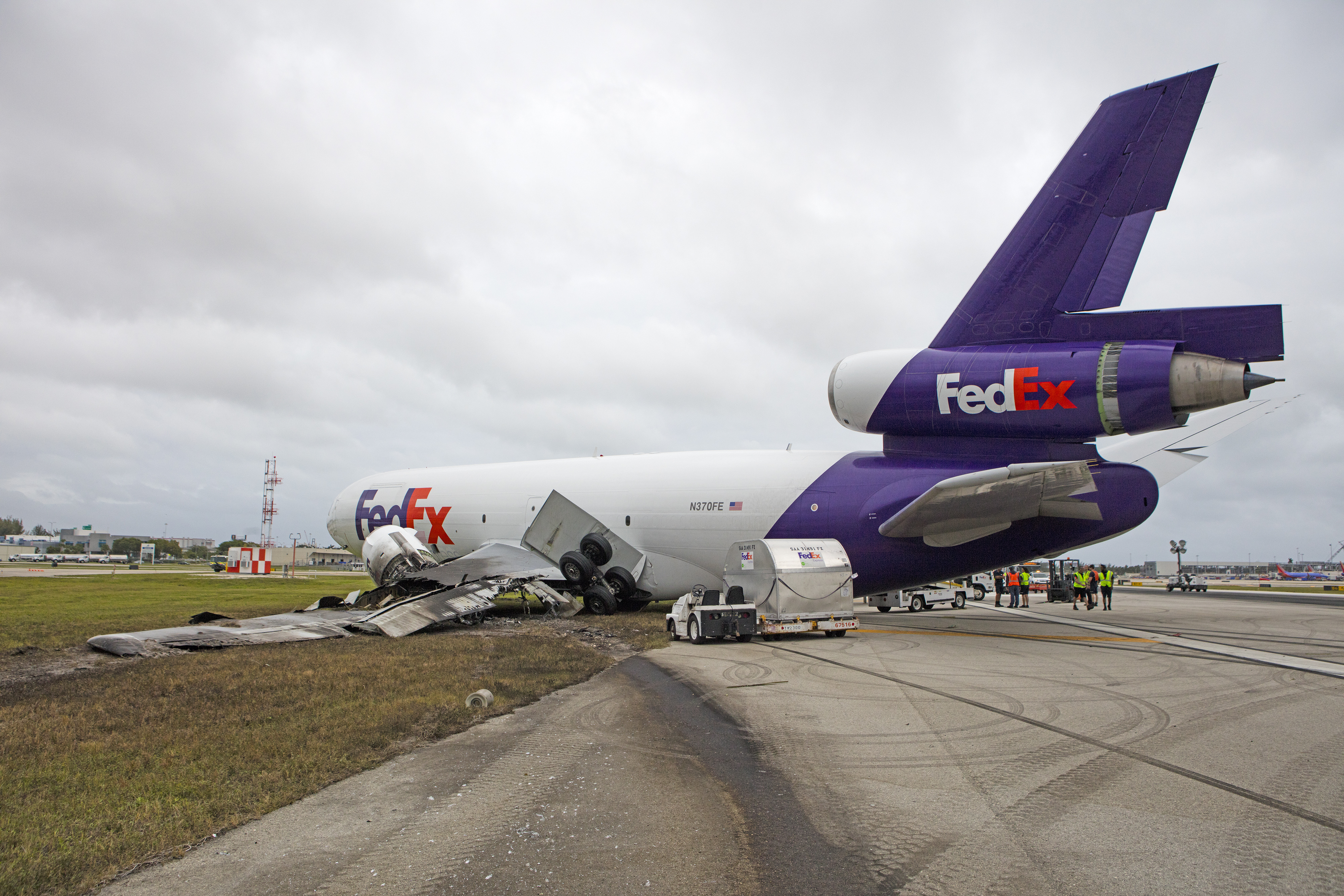
FedEx Express Flight 910 experienced a landing gear malfunction in October 2016.

- On May 18, 1972, an Eastern Air Lines McDonnell Douglas DC-9-31 collapsed its landing gear during landing, causing the tail section to separate. The aircraft then caught fire, but all passengers and crew were able to safely evacuate.
- On May 26, 1979, an Inter Island Shipping Inc. Lockheed Ventura, later converted into a Howard 350, crashed when one engine lost power shortly after takeoff during a forced landing, impacting trees near FLL. Both occupants died. Contaminated fluid was found in the carburetor of the engine.
- On July 7, 1983, Air Florida Flight 8 with 47 people on board was flying from Fort Lauderdale International Airport to Tampa International Airport. One of the passengers handed a note to a flight attendant, saying that he had a bomb, and telling them to fly the plane to Havana, Cuba. He opened a small athletic bag, inside of which was an apparent explosive device. The airplane was diverted to Havana-José Martí International Airport, and the hijacker was taken into custody by Cuban authorities.
- On November 19, 2013, an Air Evac International Learjet 35 crashed shortly after take-off from the airport, impacting the Atlantic Ocean three miles northeast of FLL on its way to Cozumel, Mexico. The aircraft made a mayday, possibly due to engine failure, and was attempting to return to the airport at the time. Four people died.
- On October 29, 2015, Dynamic Airways Flight 405, a Boeing 767-246ER (N251MY), was taxiing to a runway to take off for a flight to Caracas, Venezuela when its left engine caught fire due to a fuel leak. The crew immediately stopped the airplane and fire crews arrived on the scene. All 101 passengers and crew evacuated the aircraft, and 17 passengers were transported to a hospital. All runways were shut down and air operations suspended at the airport for three hours.
- On October 28, 2016, FedEx Express Flight 910, a McDonnell Douglas MD-10-10F suffered a landing gear collapse upon landing. The aircraft subsequently caught fire, which destroyed the left wing and engine. The two crew members on board both survived.
- On July 23, 2023, shortly after take off, an Allegiant Airways Airbus A320 turned into the path of a Gulfstream private plane. The traffic collision avoidance system alarm on both planes activated. Both planes subsequently took evasive action and averted a collision.
