= Servicios de Transportes Aéreos Fueguinos =

Argentine cargo airline, 1985–2005

IATA	ICAO	Call sign
FS	STU	FUEGUINO
- Founded: September 11, 1985
- Ceased operations: 2005
- Fleet size: 2
- Headquarters: Buenos Aires, Argentina

Servicios de Transportes Aéreos Fueguinos S.A. (also known as STAF Airlines) was an Argentinean cargo airline based in Buenos Aires, operating scheduled and chartered flights to destinations throughout the Americas using leased aircraft. The airline went out of business in 2005.

== Fleet ==
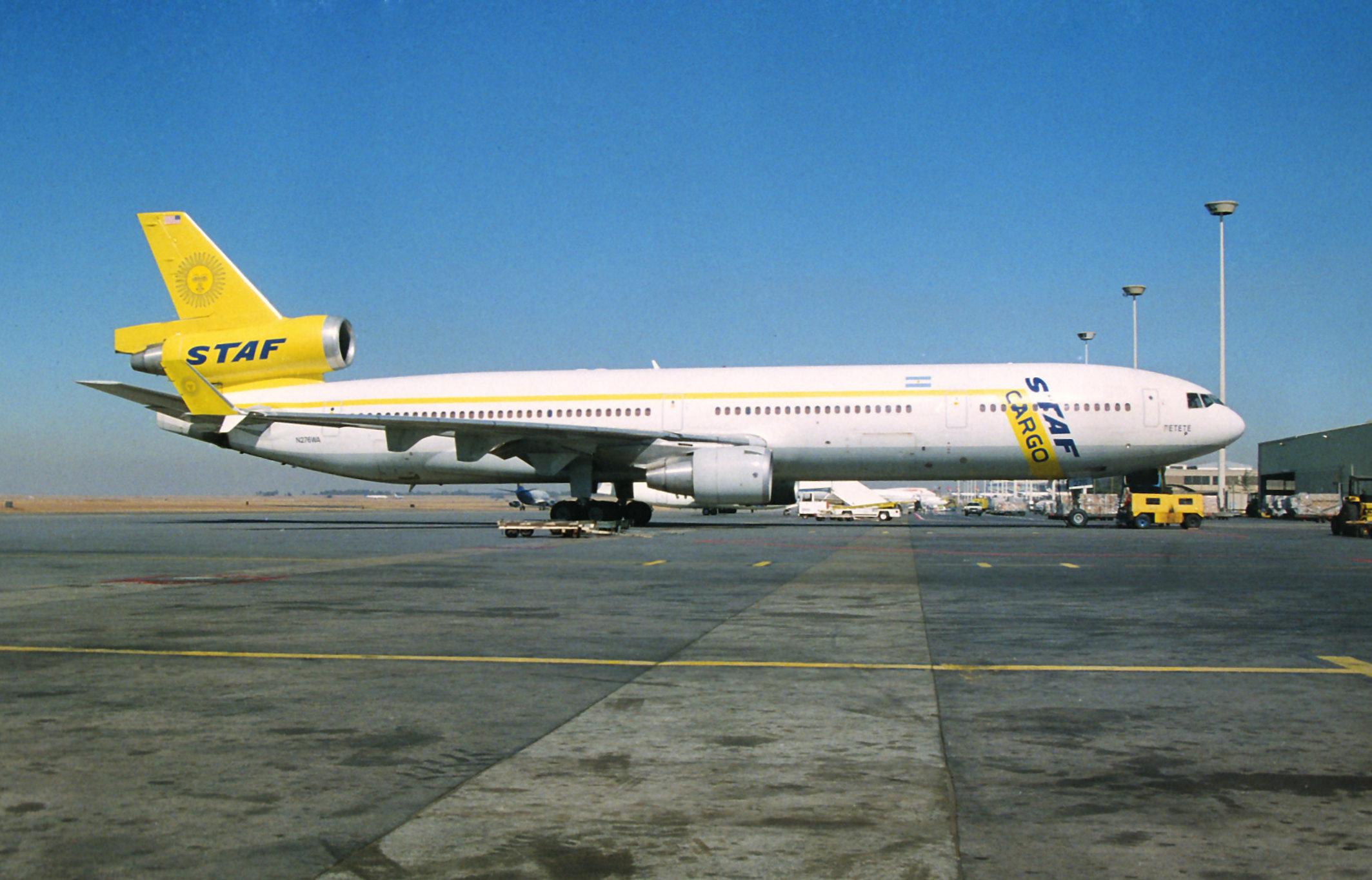
A STAF McDonnell Douglas MD-11CF at O. R. Tambo International Airport in 2001

SATF operated the following aircraft:

STAF fleet
Aircraft	Total	Introduced	Retired	Notes
Boeing 757-200	1	1997	1998	Leased from TAESA Lineas Aéreas
Lockheed L-188C Electra	1	1986	1990	
McDonnell Douglas DC-10-30CF	1	1996	1999	Leased from TAESA Lineas Aéreas
McDonnell Douglas MD-11CF	1	1998	2000	Leased from World Airways

== See also ==
- List of defunct airlines of Argentina
