= Aston Martin Residences =

Skyscraper in Miami

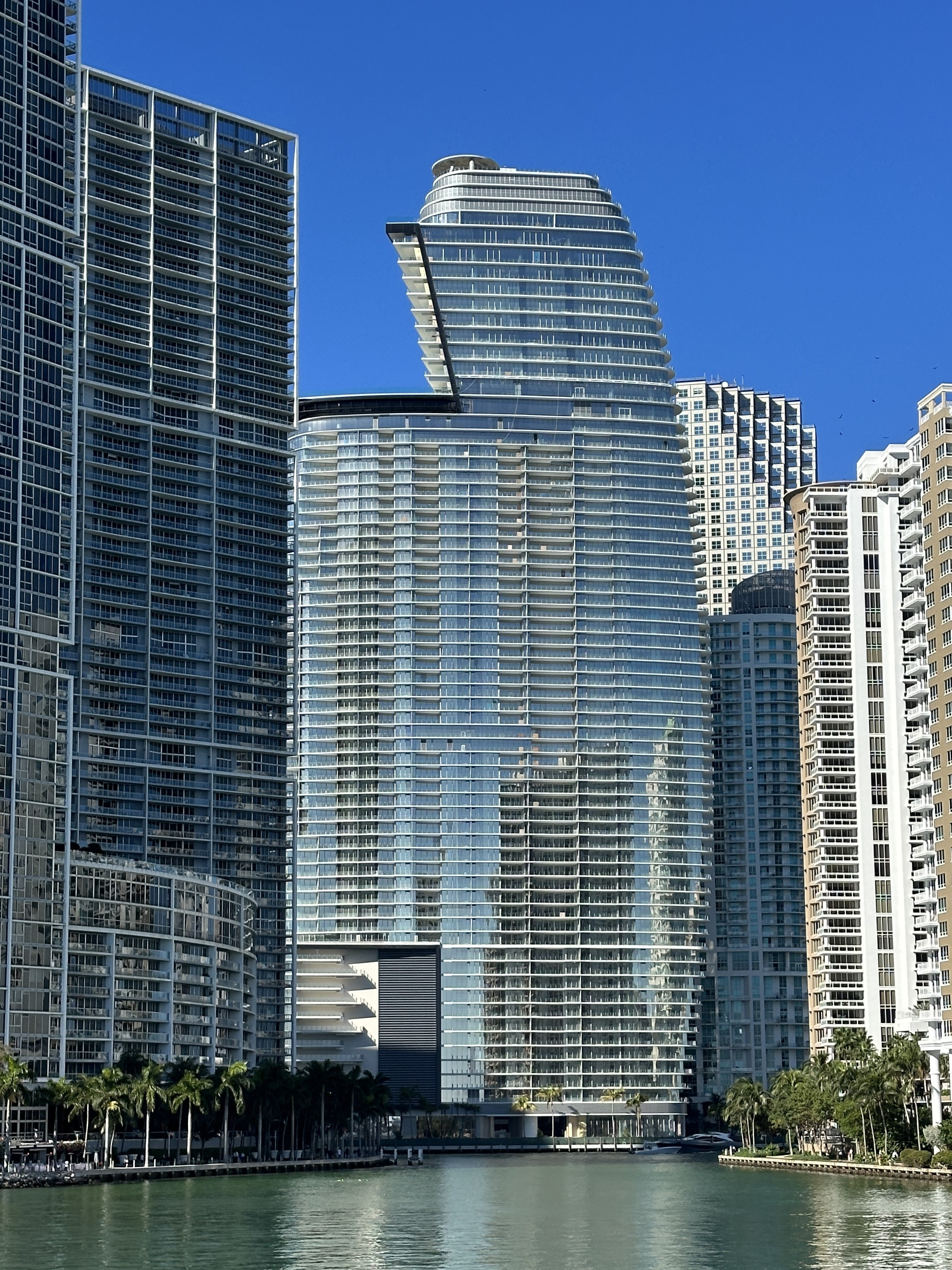
- Aston Martin Residences in 2023
- Interactive map of the Aston Martin Residences area

General information
- Status: Completed
- Type: Residential
- Location: Downtown, Miami, United States
- Coordinates: 25.77077°N 80.18785°W
- Construction started: 2019
- Topped-out: December 1, 2021
- Completed: April 30, 2024

Height
- Roof: 821 ft (250 m)

Technical details
- Floor count: 66

Design and construction
- Architects: Bodas Miani Anger, Revuelta

Website
- astonmartinresidences.com

Aston Martin Residences is a 66-story skyscraper in Miami, Florida, United States, located in Downtown Miami along the Miami River and Biscayne Bay. The building is the third-tallest in Miami and the state of Florida, it features a helipad on the roof and a full-service marina that can accommodate superyachts. The building contains 391 residences, with 99% of those residences have been sold as of May 6, 2024. The only one remaining is the triplex penthouse unit which includes the last ever Aston Martin Vulcan with purchase.

The building topped out in December 2021, becoming the tallest all-residential building south of New York City at the time.Aston Martin Residences is being developed by G&G Business Developments in conjunction with Aston Martin. Miami-based Cervera Real Estate is handling sales of the 66-story tower.

== History ==
The 1.25-acre (0.5-hectare) site was purchased at a record price of US$100 million per acre, selling for US$125 million in 2014. In 2019 concrete for construction was poured over 36 hours, and was expected to be the largest single pour to date in the Miami region. By late 2020, over 30 floors had been built. On December 1, 2021, the building officially topped out as the tallest residential building south of New York City with a fireworks display on the Miami River, commemorating this milestone for the building as the second tallest building in Miami and Florida. Completion of the project also included a section of the Miami Riverwalk that was blocked.

== See also ==
- List of tallest buildings in Miami
- Aston Martin Brochure
