= Ludlam Trail =

Rail trail in Florida, United States

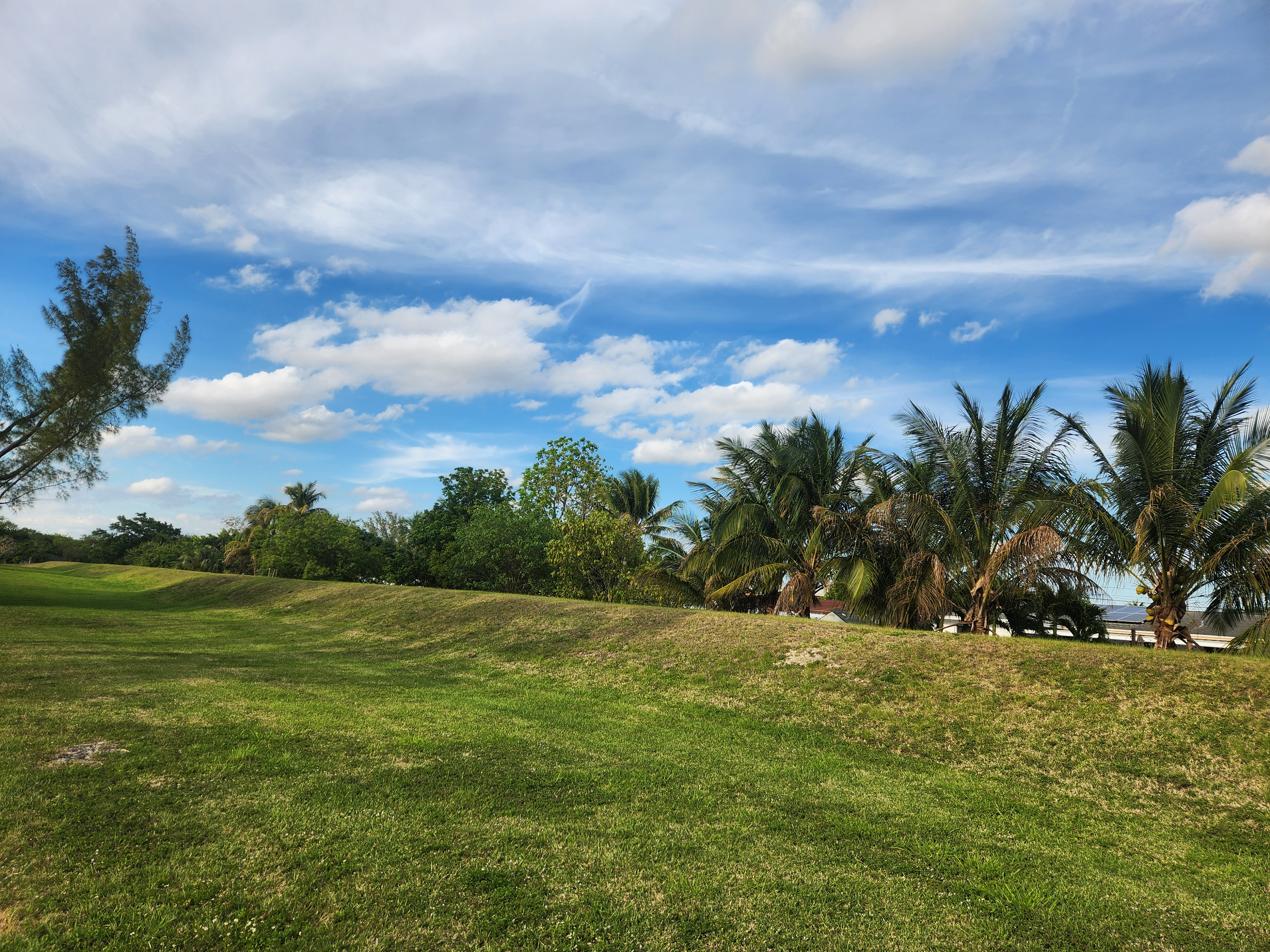
- Ludlam Trail by A.D. (Doug) Barnes Park before construction
- Length: 5.6 mi (9.0 km)
- Location: Miami-Dade, Florida, United States
- Use: Cycling, Walking, Hiking, Jogging
- Season: Year round
- Website: Ludlam Trail
Trail map

The Ludlam Trail is a proposed 5.6-mile (9 km) shared-use linear park rail trail in Miami-Dade County, Florida, that will follow the former Florida East Coast Railway Little River Branch between NW 7th Street and SW 80th Street. The trail is planned to provide safe and direct pathways for walking, running, and cycling, as well as connect schools, parks, transit stops, residences, workplaces, and shopping areas. The trail is envisioned as part of the "Miami Loop", a network of bikeways that also includes the Perimeter Trail, the Miami River Greenway, and The Underline. A groundbreaking ceremony was held October 26, 2021. Construction is anticipated to start fall of 2026.

== History ==
The Ludlam Trail corridor was originally owned by the Florida East Coast Railway (FEC), which operated passenger and freight trains along the line. The FEC abandoned the segment between NW 7th Street and SW 80th Street in 2002, leaving behind a vacant and overgrown right-of-way. In 2003, a group of local residents and advocates formed Friends of Ludlam Trail (FOLT), a non-profit organization dedicated to preserving and transforming the corridor into a linear park and trail. FOLT partnered with Rails-to-Trails Conservancy (RTC), a national organization that promotes the conversion of unused rail corridors into trails, to conduct feasibility studies and community outreach for the project.

In 2014, FOLT and RTC reached an agreement with the FEC to purchase the corridor for $25 million, with the condition that they secure funding from Miami-Dade County and other sources within two years. In 2016, Miami-Dade County approved a $23 million bond issuance to acquire the corridor, with the remaining $2 million coming from private donations and grants. The County completed the purchase of the corridor in 2018 and began the process of planning and designing the trail.

In 2019, Miami-Dade County Parks, Recreation and Open Spaces Department initiated a Project Development and Environment (PD&E) Study for the Ludlam Trail project, which is expected to be completed by late 2023.
