= The Underline =

Linear park trail in Miami, Florida, U.S.

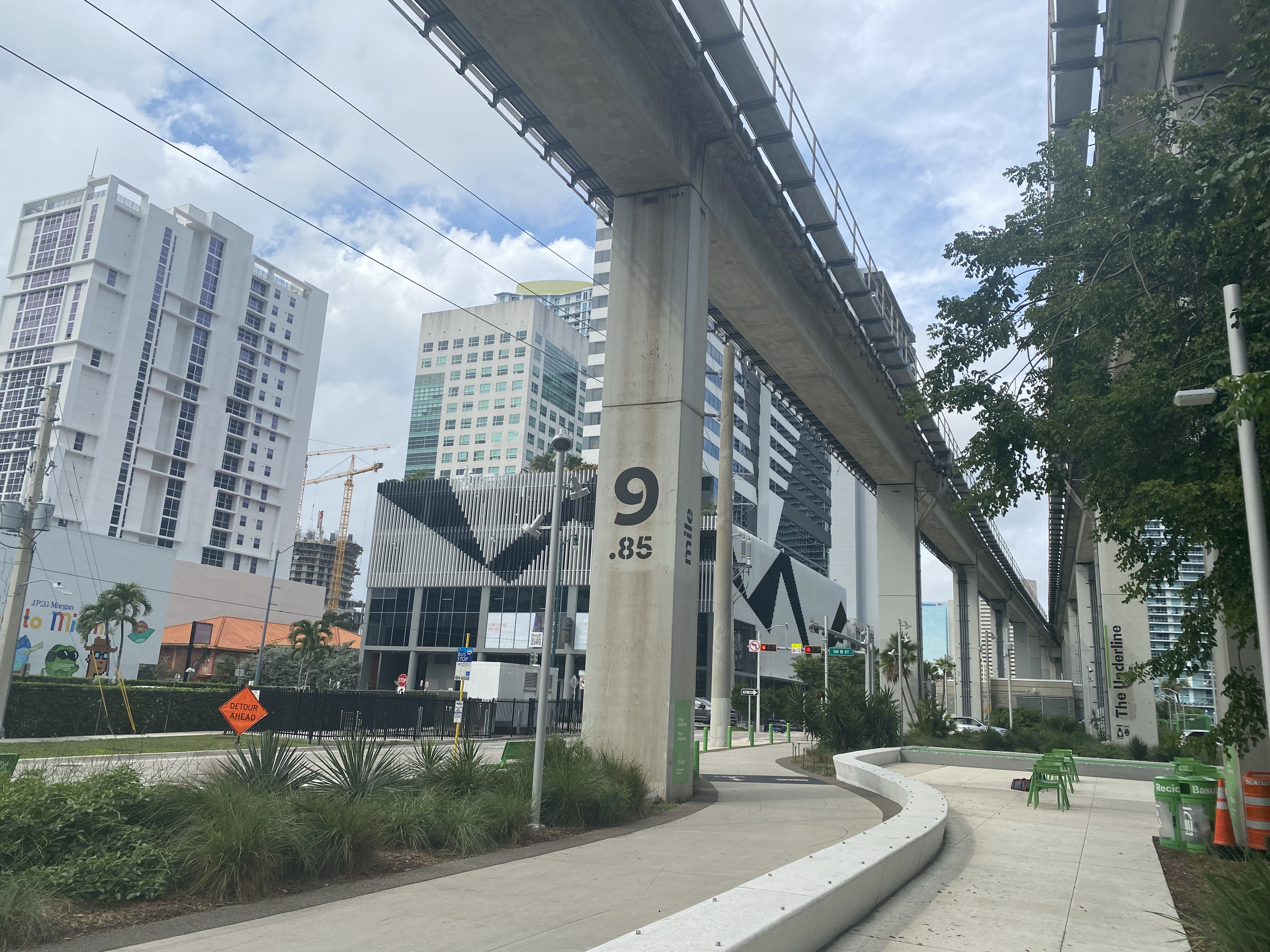
- The Underline, near Brickell station, December 2022
- Length: 10 mi (16 km)
- Location: Miami, Florida, U.S.
- Trailheads: Miami River Greenway; Dadeland South station
- Use: Linear park, shared-use path
- Waymark: Bike Route M
- Surface: Asphalt
- Right of way: Metrorail
- Maintainer: Miami-Dade County
- Website: theunderline.org

The Underline is a 10-mile-long (16 km) linear park under development in Miami-Dade County, Florida. When completed, it will run beneath the county's elevated Metrorail system between the Brickell neighborhood of Downtown Miami and Dadeland South station in Kendall. The project converts a pre-existing bicycle and pedestrian path known as the MetroPath or M-Path. At Dadeland South, the Underline connects with the South Dade Trail forming a continuous corridor extending south to Florida City.

The first phase of The Underline, located in the Brickell area, was completed on February 26, 2021. The second phase, extending from Brickell to just south of Vizcaya station, opened on April 24, 2024. The third and final phase is scheduled for completion in 2026.

== Route ==
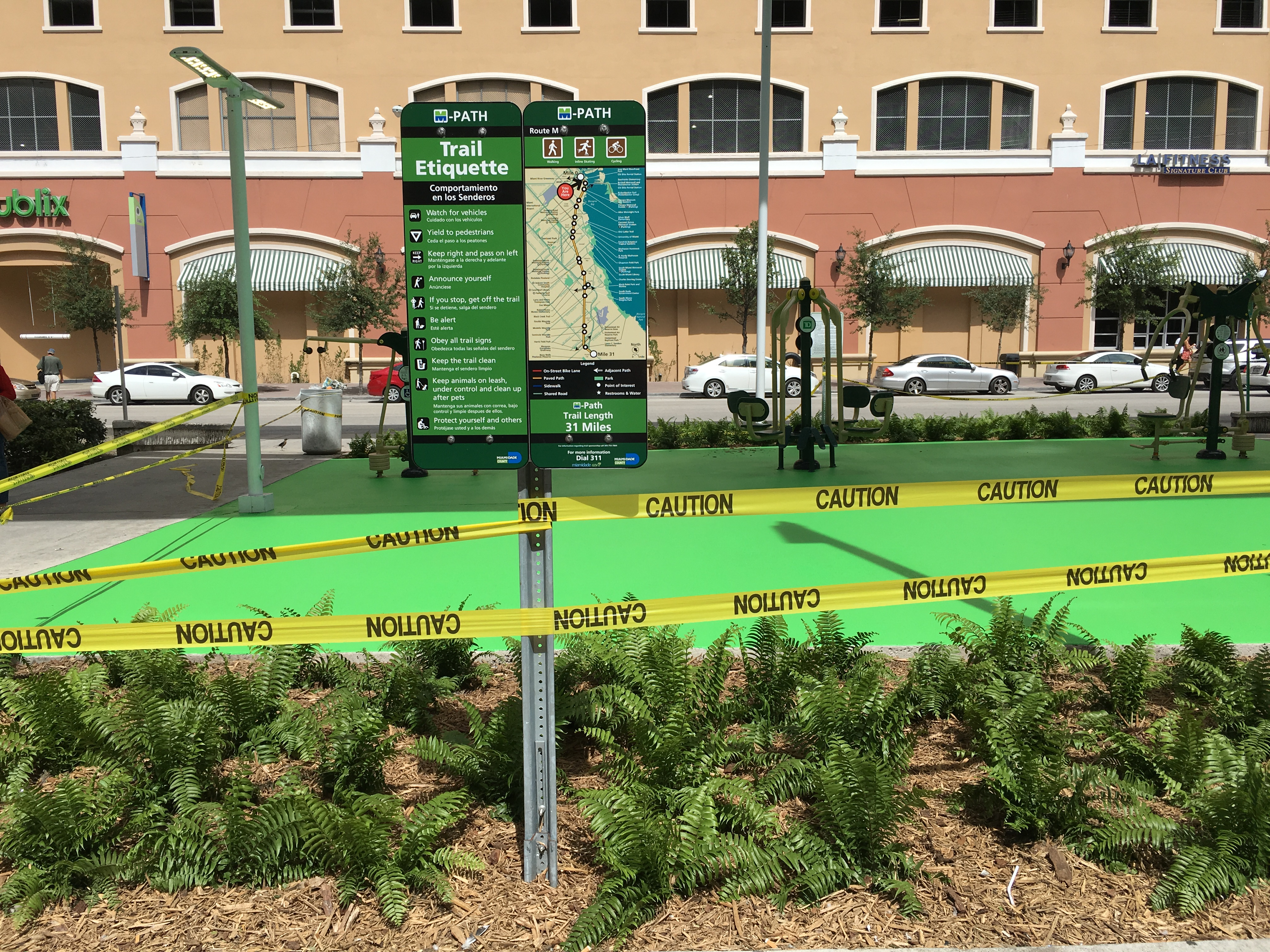
Brickell station exercise park and MetroPath sign opened in 2016

The Underline begins at the Miami River in the Brickell neighborhood of Downtown Miami, where it connects with the Miami River Greenway. From there, it runs south beneath the Metrorail through Brickell, Coral Gables, and Kendall, terminating at Dadeland South station.

At Dadeland South, the Underline is planned to connect with the proposed Ludlam Trail linear park. It also connects with the 22-mile-long (35 km) South Dade Trail, which follows the former Florida East Coast Railway right-of-way along the South Dade TransitWay to Florida City. Together, the two paths form a continuous 32-mile-long (51 km) off-road corridor for pedestrians and cyclists. The routes are included within the East Coast Greenway project to create a 3,000-mile (4,800 km) trail network connecting Maine to Florida.

=== Brickell Backyard ===
The first phase consists of the north end of the line, which is called the Brickell Backyard. The Brickell Backyard is an urban park along The Underline that includes the Typoe Sculpture Garden, a sound stage plaza, Urban Gym with basketball court, workout stations, and a running track, as well as butterfly gardens with native plants that surround gathering spaces.

=== Hammock Trail ===
The second phase consists of a linear trail between the Brickell Backyard and SW 19th Ave. This part of The Underline rehabilitates over 100,000 native plants and trees. It includes the Hammock Playground, Vizcaya Station Plaza, and the Rain Garden. It is also adjacent to Simpson Park Hammock, one of the few remaining pieces of the area's native tropical hardwood hammock along the Miami Rock Ridge.

== History ==
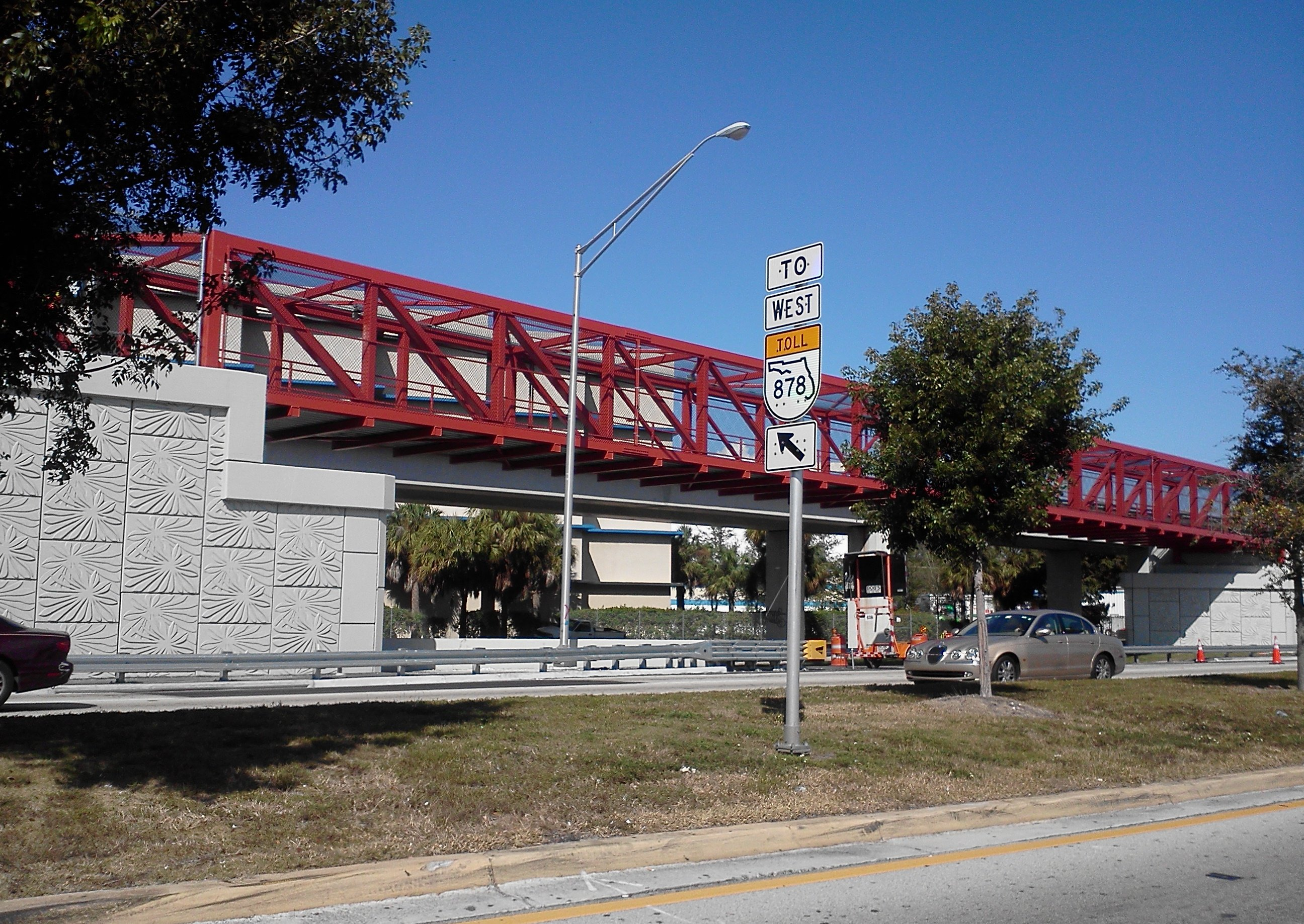
The MetroPath bridge over the entrance to the Snapper Creek Expressway opened in 2011.

The Underline developed from the MetroPath (M-Path), a bicycle and pedestrian path constructed largely alongside the opening of the Metrorail in 1984. The M-Path was originally built as a service road for the Metrorail. The corridor follows the former right-of-way of the Florida East Coast Railway's main line between Miami and Kendall, which was abandoned in 1972 and purchased by Miami-Dade County in 1979.

In late 2011, the M-Path was extended with the addition of a 200-foot (61 m) bridge over the entrance to the Snapper Creek Expressway (State Road 878) near Dadeland North station, completing a continuous route with the exception of several interruptions at major road crossings, including near Coral Way and Douglas Road.

In 2014, proposals were introduced to redevelop the M-Path as a linear park. The concept was advanced by the nonprofit group Friends of the GreenLink, with planning support from the University of Miami. By 2015, the project was formally named The Underline, with design work led by James Corner and recognition by Miami-Dade County.

The first phase of The Underline, called the Brickell Backyard runs a half-mile from the Miami River to SW 13th Street in the Brickell area, opened on February 26, 2021. The second phase, extending the Underline 2.14 miles from SW 13th Street through historic Roads, Shenandoah, and Silver Bluff neighborhoods in the City of Miami to SW 19th Avenue just south of Vizcaya station, opened on April 24, 2024. The third and final phase is a 7.36-mile segment from SW 19th Avenue to Dadeland South station is scheduled for completion in 2026.

In 2025, a free bicycle sharing program began operating along The Underline corridor. The program introduced a network of bicycle stations across the park and was developed in partnership with The Underline and Miami-Dade County as part of efforts to promote active transportation and community engagement along the trail.
