= MetroConnect =

Public ridesharing system in Miami-Dade County

Overview
- Owner: Miami-Dade County
- Area served: Northern Miami-Dade; Northeastern Miami-Dade; Civic Center; Westchester; Kendall; Dadeland; South Miami; West Perrine & South Miami Heights; Cutler Bay; Southern Miami-Dade
- Transit type: Demand-responsive transit; Carpool
- Website: https://city.ridewithvia.com/metroconnect

Operation
- Began operation: 2020
- Operator: Via Transportation

MetroConnect (formerly named GoConnect) is a publicly funded rideshare service and demand-responsive transit system operating in Miami-Dade County. The service is operated by Via Transportation. Riders inside one of several service zones can, by app or phone call, request a MetroConnect vehicle to a public street close to them and ride to a destination within that same service zone. During the trip, the vehicle will pick up other unrelated passengers who have the same destination.

The service is meant to help riders with last mile transportation between mass transit stations in the region and riders' destinations or point-to-point travel within the service zone where fixed-route bus lines can complicate travel.

As of September 2025, 12 distinct service zones exist:

- North Dade.
- Northeast
- Northeast 2, which covers Aventura Mall and a small portion of the surrounding area, including the Aventura Brightline station.
- Westchester, Kendall North, and Kendall South, which overlap slightly along their borders.
- Dadeland North, Dadeland South, and South Miami, which heavily overlap near the Metrorail right-of-way.
- Cutler Bay and Transit Way (which includes a portion of South Miami Heights and all of West Perrine, across the South Dade Transitway from Cutler Bay)
- South Dade

== History ==
MetroConnect launched in 2020 during the COVID-19 pandemic under the name GoConnect to cover gaps in bus service. When it was first rolled out, MetroConnect cost the standard Miami-Dade Transit fare, which was $2.25 at the time. During its first two years of service, MetroConnect saw an average of 5,000 trips per month, and 150,000 total trips by the start of 2023.

On October 2, 2023, GoConnect had its name was changed to MetroConnect and services changed. In the service update, the service zones were expanded, and the service was made completely free. The upgrade coincided with the Better Bus Network, a series of broader service upgrades and route changes to Miami-Dade Transit's Metrobus system, with the service charges partially intended to help the minority of riders whose access to Metrobus was made worse by the route changes. As of 2023, the county reported that MetroConnect service had increased communities within its coverage to 57% more jobs within a 45-minute commute via connection to Miami-Dade Transit hubs; the average MetroConnect user booked 10 trips per month and 65% of riders reported they did not have a car.

In September 2025, county Mayor Daniella Levine Cava reversed a decision to entirely shut down MetroConnect as part of a series of austerity measures planned in response to the county's 400-million-dollar budget deficit. Instead, a compromise was reached: $4.5 million would be taken from a reserve dedicated to future transit projects to fund MetroConnect; MetroConnect was to drop their low-ridership zones, reduce operating hours, place a three-mile cap on trips, and lose its no-fare designation. As of October 1, 2026, MetroConnect costs $3.75 each way for a standard fare and $1.50 for the reduced fare.
