= Miami-Dade Transit =

Public transit agency in Miami, Florida

Miami-Dade Transit Agency

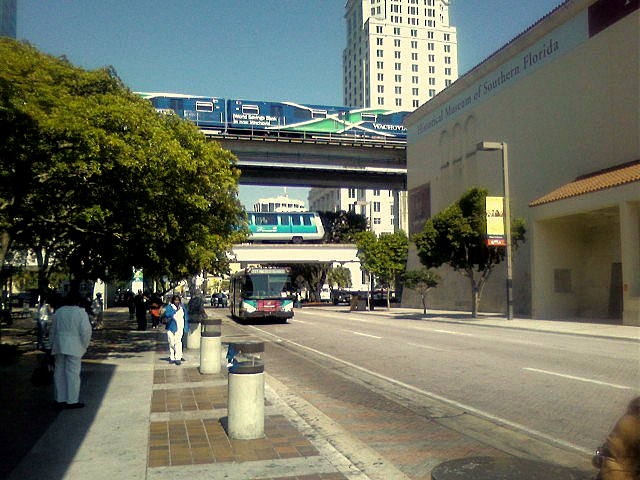
- Metrorail (top), Metromover (middle), and Metrobus (bottom) at Government Center

Overview
- Owner: Miami-Dade County
- Locale: Greater Miami
- Transit type: Bus; Bus rapid transit; Downtown people mover; Rapid transit
- Number of lines: 2 Metrorail lines 3 Metromover loops 79 Metrobus routes 1 Transitway
- Number of stations: 23 (Metrorail); 22 (Metromover); 28 (South Dade Transitway)
- Daily ridership: 254,200 (weekdays, Q2 2026)
- Annual ridership: 80,797,500 (2025)
- Chief executive: Stacy L. Miller, P.E.
- Headquarters: 701 NW 1st Court; Miami, Florida
- Website: www.miamidade.gov/global/transportation/home.page

Operation
- Began operation: August 2, 1960; February 1997
- Operator: Miami-Dade Transit
- Number of vehicles: 817 buses 136 Metrorail cars 42 Metromover cars
System map

Miami-Dade Transit Agency (MDTA) is the primary public transit authority of Miami, Florida and the greater Miami-Dade County area. It is the largest transit system in Florida and the 15th-largest transit system in the United States. As of 2025, the system has 80,797,500 rides per year, or about 254,200 per weekday in the second quarter of 2026. MDT operates the Metrobus with their paratransit STS systems run by LSF. MDT also operates two rail transit systems: Metrorail and Metromover.

Metrobus operates over 93 routes, including the South-Dade Transitway. MDT's main transit stations are Government Center in Downtown, and the Miami Intermodal Center in Grapeland Heights, which can access the Miami International Airport.

Metrorail is composed of two rail lines (Green and Orange lines) with 23 stations radiating from the city center towards outlying neighborhoods north and south of Downtown. Metromover operates throughout the Downtown, Omni, and Brickell neighborhoods, and is composed of three rail loops and 22 stations. The opening of the Metrorail Orange Line in July 2012 significantly increased usage of the system. As of 2013, rail fares collected were $23 million/yr and it cost $78 million/yr to operate the rail system.

Tri-Rail is a separate entity and not controlled by MDT. Tri-Rail, a commuter rail system in the Miami metropolitan area, is directly connected at the Tri-Rail and Metrorail Transfer station, Miami Intermodal Center, and Government Center station.

== History ==
In 1960, the Dade County Commission passed an ordinance creating the Metropolitan Transit Authority (MTA) to unify the different transit operations into one countywide service. This ordinance provided for the purchase, development, and operation of an adequate mass transit system by the County. These companies included the Miami Transit Company, Miami Beach Railway Company, South Miami Coach Lines, and Keys Transit Company on Key Biscayne and would be managed by National City Management Company. National City was dismissed as manager in 1974. Over the years and under various administrations, MTA evolved into the Metro-Dade Transportation Administration, the Metro-Dade Transit Agency, the Miami-Dade Transit Agency, and is now known simply as Miami-Dade Transit (MDT).

Miami-Dade Transit, a county department of more than 4,000 employees, is the largest transit agency in the state of Florida and accounts for more than half of the trips taken on public transit in the state. MDT operates an accessible, integrated system of 93-plus Metrobus routes; the 22-mile (35 km) Metrorail rapid transit system; Metromover, a free Downtown people mover system; and the Paratransit division's Special Transportation Service. Metrobus routes cover more than 35-million miles annually, including limited service to Broward and Monroe counties. In 2004, MDT's Metrorail, Metromover, and Metrobus transported more than 96 million passengers, compared to 85 million the previous year.

=== 2011 federal investigation ===
Miami-Dade Transit was undergoing a federal investigation by the Federal Transit Administration that includes several audits and a criminal investigation of the transit agency due to concerns over money mismanagement within the agency. This caused a freezing of federal funds being granted to the county agency. In late 2010 the county manager claimed that it was 'not fraud' but rather accounting errors, poor management, and erroneous information given to the auditors that triggered the investigation, including a withdrawal of $15 million through the ECHO program that was made by a transit official two hours after a letter arrived in September 2010 from the FTA telling them withdrawals had been restricted. The investigation and lack of funding let to emergency service cuts to Metrorail, Metrobus, and Metromover being considered by the agency by the middle of 2011, six months into the investigation and lack of funding which began in November 2010, causing MDT to lose $185 million in grant money. Assistant county manager Ysela Llort became responsible for Miami-Dade Transit after director Harpal Kapoor left in April 2011. Additionally, funding for the Metrorail airport link was jeopardized by the funding freeze. The FTA decided to continue funding under strict control in order to keep service cuts from happening.

MDT headquarters are located in the Overtown Transit Village in Downtown Miami.

== Services ==
=== Metrorail ===
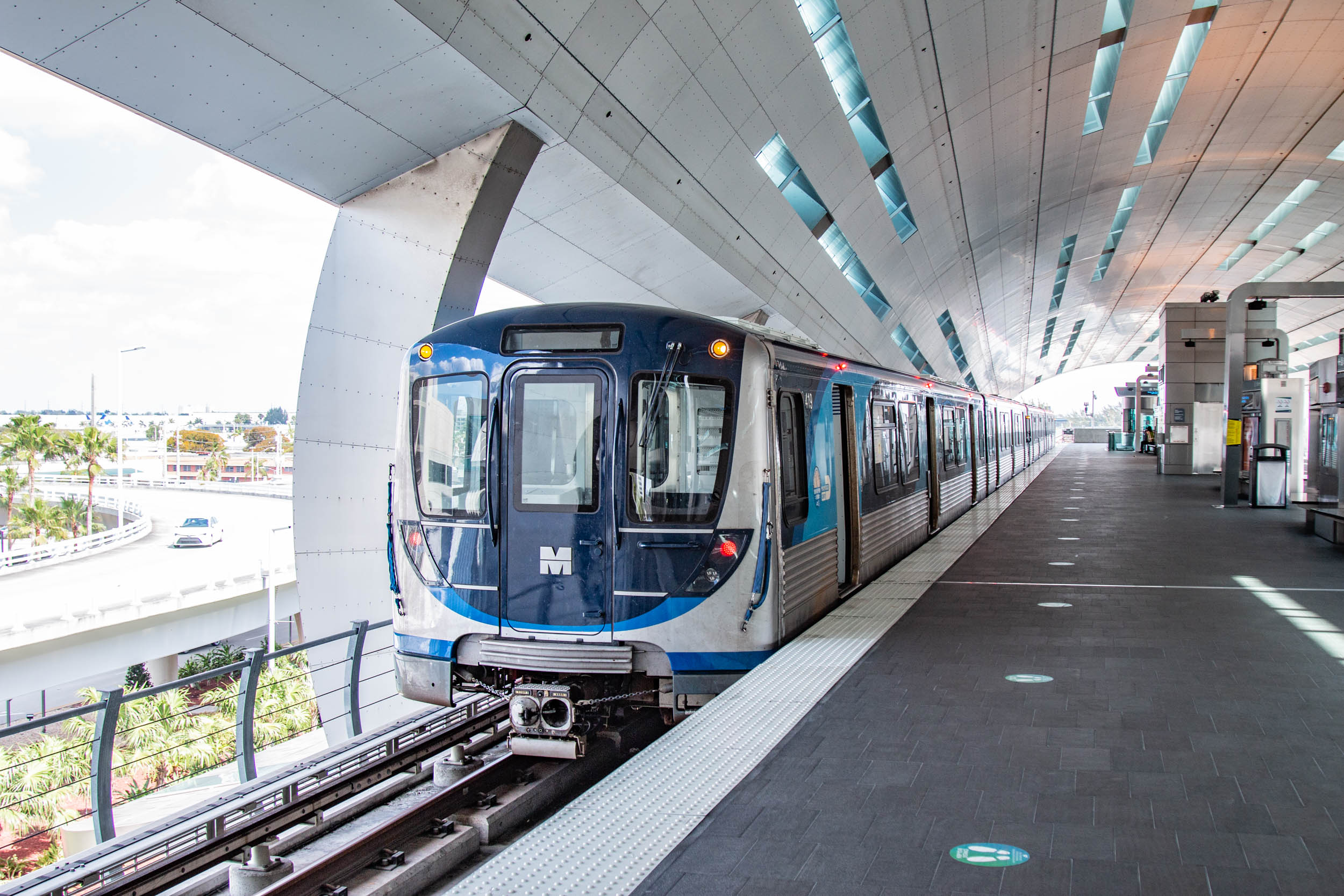
A northbound Orange Line train arriving at Miami International Airport

Metrorail is a rapid transit system in Miami and Miami-Dade County in the U.S. state of Florida. It is operated by Miami-Dade Transit (MDT), a departmental agency of Miami-Dade County. Opened in 1984, it is Florida's only rapid transit metro system and consists of two lines and 23 stations over 24.4 miles (39.3 km) of standard gauge track.

Metrorail serves central Miami and surrounding areas, including Miami International Airport, the Health District, Downtown Miami, and Brickell, as well as the northern communities of Hialeah and Medley. To the south, service extends through The Roads, Coconut Grove, Coral Gables, and South Miami to Dadeland in Kendall. The system connects to the Metromover in Downtown Miami and to Tri-Rail and Brightline services. Metrobus routes serve all stations. In 2025, the system recorded 14,971,300 trips, with an average of 50,100 weekday riders as of the second quarter of 2026.

=== Metromover ===
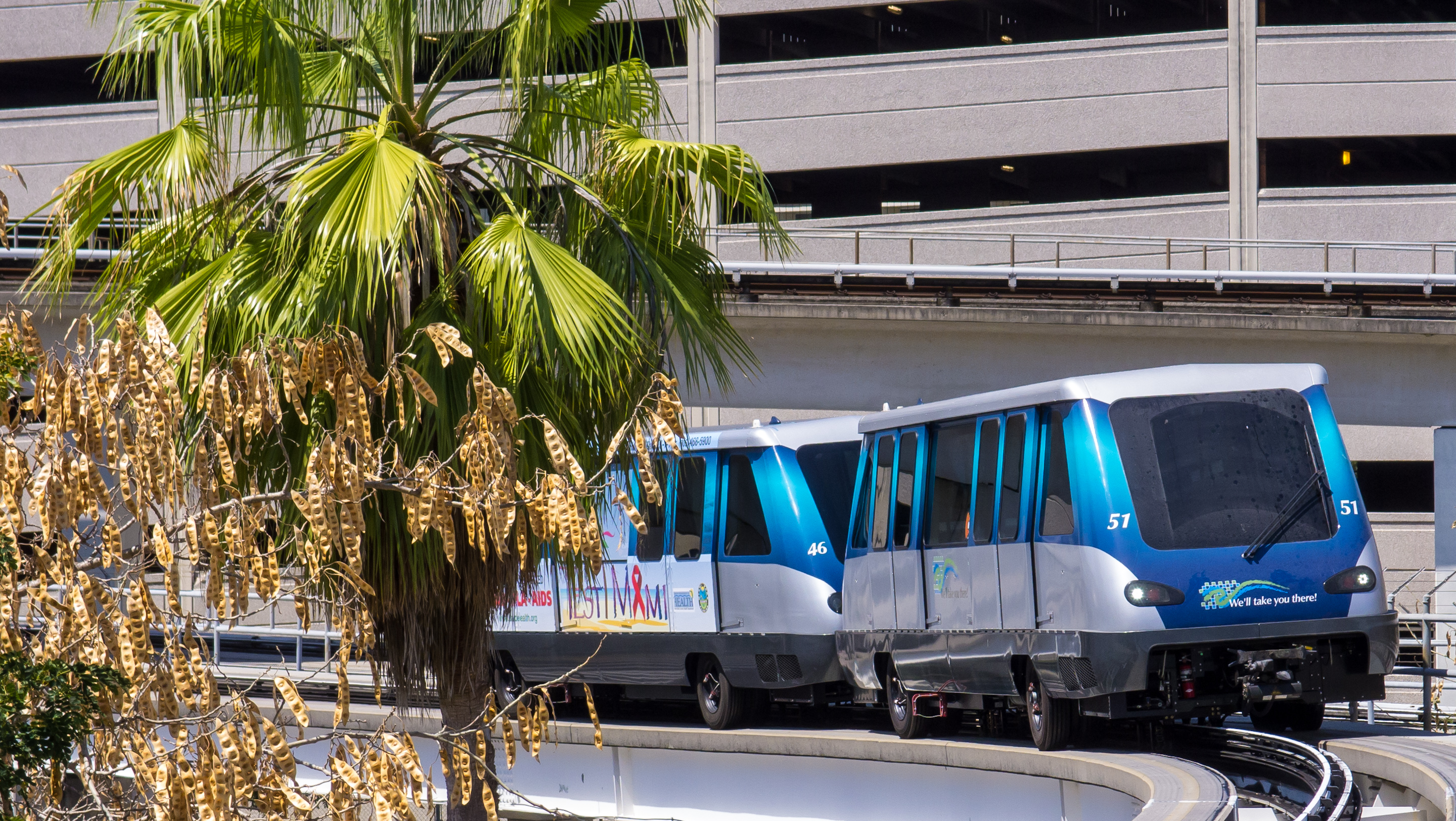
Metromover train in the Arts & Entertainment District

The Metromover is a fare-free automated people mover system operated by Miami-Dade Transit in Miami, Florida, United States. Metromover serves the Downtown Miami, Brickell, Park West and Arts & Entertainment District neighborhoods. Metromover connects directly with Metrorail at Government Center and Brickell stations. It also connects to Metrobus with dedicated bus loops at Government Center and Adrienne Arsht Center station. It originally began service to the Downtown/Inner Loop on April 17, 1986, and was later expanded with the Omni and Brickell Loop extensions on May 26, 1994.

The Metromover serves primarily as an alternative way to travel within the greater Downtown Miami neighborhoods. The system is composed of three loops and 21 stations. The stations are located approximately two blocks away from each other, and connect near all major buildings and places in the Downtown area. As of 2025, the system has 7,683,800 rides per year, or about 25,800 per day in the second quarter of 2026.

Out of three downtown people movers in the United States, the other two being the former Jacksonville Skyway and the Detroit People Mover, the Metromover is by far the busiest in terms of ridership, the only completed system of the three, and considered to be a catalyst for downtown development.

=== Metrobus ===
The Metrobus network is a bus system in Miami-Dade County, Florida, operated by Miami-Dade Transit. It consists of 95 routes connecting most points in the county and part of southern Broward County as well. As of 2025, the system has 56,482,500 rides per year, or about 171,600 per day in the second quarter of 2026.

Seven routes operate around the clock: Routes 3, 11, 27, 77, 79 (No 24-hour service to Hialeah, all trips terminate at Northside Station), 100 and 602. Routes 246 Night Owl & Route 500 Midnight Owl operate from midnight to 5 am. Other routes operate from 4:30 am to 1:30 am. All Metrobuses are wheelchair accessible, in compliance with the Americans with Disabilities Act of 1990 and equipped with Bicycle racks.

Bus route 301 (Dade-Monroe Express) extends into Monroe County, reaching Marathon, where a transfer is available to a Key West Transit bus proceeding further into the Keys. With the appropriate bus transfers, one can travel all the way from Key West to Sebastian entirely on public-transit buses. Metrobus has many connections to Metrorail and Metromover, also operated by Miami-Dade Transit, mainly in the city of Miami.

=== South Dade TransitWay ===
The South Dade TransitWay (originally named the South Miami-Dade Busway) is a bus rapid transit (BRT) corridor, or busway, serving southern Miami-Dade County, Florida, running approximately 20 miles (32 km) between Dadeland South Metrorail station and Southwest 344th Street in Florida City, parallel to U.S. Route 1 (South Dixie Highway) along a former Florida East Coast Railway right-of-way.

Service began on February 3, 1997, on an 8.3-mile (13.4 km) segment between the Dadeland South station of Metrorail and Southplace Mall (then known as Cutler Ridge Mall). The corridor was extended 5 miles (8 km) to Southwest 264th Street on April 24, 2005, followed by a final 6.5-mile (10.5 km) extension to Southwest 344th Street in Florida City on December 16, 2007. Between 2021 and 2025, the corridor was rebuilt with dedicated bus rapid transit stations and supporting infrastructure, supplementing the original busway stops.

=== Paratransit (STS) ===
Paratransit/Special Transportation Services (STS) is available for people with a mental or physical disability who cannot ride Metrobus, Metrorail, or Metromover. For $3.50 per one-way trip, STS offers shared-ride, door-to-door travel in accessible vehicles throughout most of Miami-Dade County, in some parts of south Broward County, and in the middle and northern Keys. STS operates 24 hours a day, 7 days a week, including most holidays. Service is run by private company.

== Future plans ==
=== SMART Program ===
The Strategic Miami Area Rapid Transit (SMART) Program involves the implementation of five rapid transit corridors in Miami-Dade County. It includes new extensions of the current Metrorail and Metromover systems as well as the introduction of new forms of rapid transit, such as bus rapid transit (BRT).

==== North Corridor (Metrorail extension) ====
The North Corridor is an extension of the current Metrorail system along NW 27 Avenue from the Dr. Martin Luther King Jr. Plaza station to the north county line. It will be implemented in two phases. The first phase will extend the Metrorail to a station at the Hard Rock Stadium, with a stop at the Miami-Dade College North Campus. The second phase will include the remainder of the project, with a total of eight new stations added.

==== Northeast Corridor (Commuter rail) ====
The Northeast Corridor will feature commuter rail service (potentially Tri-Rail), extending from MiamiCentral to the Aventura station along the existing Florida East Coast Railway (FEC) tracks. It will have seven stations for the service in Miami-Dade, with both of the terminal stations having access to Brightline. Service could begin as soon as 2032.

==== East-West Corridor (Bus Rapid Transit) ====
The East-West Corridor consists of three BRT routes on dedicated bus lanes running from Tamiami Terminal to the Miami Intermodal Center and Government Center, as well as through the Blue Lagoon area. One of the routes will go on dedicated lanes, mainly along SR 836, and include four stations between Tamiami Terminal and the Miami Intermodal Center.

In April 2023, the Miami-Dade Transportation Planning Organization (TPO) considered commuter rail service instead of BRT as the form of rapid transit for the reason that BRT is "no longer seen as practical" and that commuter rail service on the CSX Lehigh Spur has "become more flexible [on cost]." In January 2024, the TPO moved forward with the commuter rail plan as well as an alternative being Metromover along Flagler Street.

==== Beach Corridor (Metromover extensions and bus/trolley lanes) ====
The Beach Corridor includes three rapid transit projects. The first is an extension of the current Metromover system along Miami Avenue from the School Board station to NW 41st Street. The second, known as BayLink, is another Metromover extension along the southern edge of MacArthur Causeway to Miami Beach, with stations in between. BayLink could begin service as soon as 2028. The third is dedicated bus/trolley lanes along Washington Avenue from 5th Street to the Miami Beach Convention Center.

=== Resilient305 ===
Miami-Dade County's sustainability program, Resilient305, includes a main focus of an overall improvement of the area's public transportation system. The goal is to reduce congestion, cut back on emissions, and offer alternative transport options that are both more efficient and more sustainable. This includes a Transit Development Plan (TDP), which breaks down a ten-year action plan to ensure the city has reliable, safe, and clean transportation. This will be realized through fully recognizing financial resources, financial needs, citizen demands, and standards of service.

== Fares ==
The "EASY Card" system is a regional fare collection system with interoperable smartcards and equipment. The following information is specific to Miami-Dade Transit:

Since October 1, 2009, Miami-Dade Transit has used the EASY Card system for fare collection.

On December 13, 2009 paper-based bus transfers were discontinued, and bus-to-bus transfers are now free only when using an EASY Card or EASY Ticket.

- An EASY Card can be purchased for $2 at EASY Card sales outlets, vending machines in Metrorail stations, calling 3-1-1 in Miami-Dade County, or online. Money can be reloaded on to the card at the same places and locations. The card is durable plastic and lasts for 20 years from first use since 2013.
- Alternatively an EASY Ticket may be purchased with no sales charge. However EASY Tickets are limited to the fare type initially loaded onto it, and expire 60 days after purchase. EASY Tickets also may not be purchased online or via telephone.
- With the change, paper transfers are being eliminated on transit. People paying fares in cash will need to pay full fare when transferring. Transfers will be available only by paying with an EASY Card or Ticket and using the card again within 3 hours of boarding transit.

The current standard fare is $2.25 and reduced fare is $1.10. A standard monthly pass costs $112.50 and $56.25 for reduced fare (College Students). The monthly Metropass is loaded onto the EASY Card. Fare gates at all Metrorail stations does not accept any type of cash, and require an EASY Card/Ticket, contactless device, or contactless debit/credit card to enter and exit the stations.

Reduced fares are available only to Medicare recipients, people with disabilities, and Miami-Dade students in grades K-12. Fare is free to kids below 42 inches (110 cm) tall with fare-paying rider. Full time college students may also purchase a College EASY Ticket to ride Metrobus or Metrorail at $56.25 at their college/university along with a valid Student ID. Miami-Dade County employees can also receive discounted monthly rates and pre-tax savings by enrolling in the Monthly Pass Payroll Deduction program.

All Miami-Dade senior citizens aged 65 years and older and with Social Security benefits ride free with a Golden Passport pass. Veterans residing in Miami-Dade and earning less than $22,000 annually ride free with the Patriot Passport pass.

As of August 21, 2019, and December 23, 2019 riders can use their smartphones/smartwatches and contactless credit/debt cards to board the Metrorail and Metrobus. (Accepting Apple Pay, Google Pay, Samsung Pay, Fitbit Pay etc.).

== Finances ==
In 2018, the annual operating expense was $552 million; annual revenue was $106 million. Each passenger trip cost $6.77. One-way rides on Metrobus and Metrorails cost $2.25; rides on Metromover were free of charge to passengers.

== Passenger ridership ==
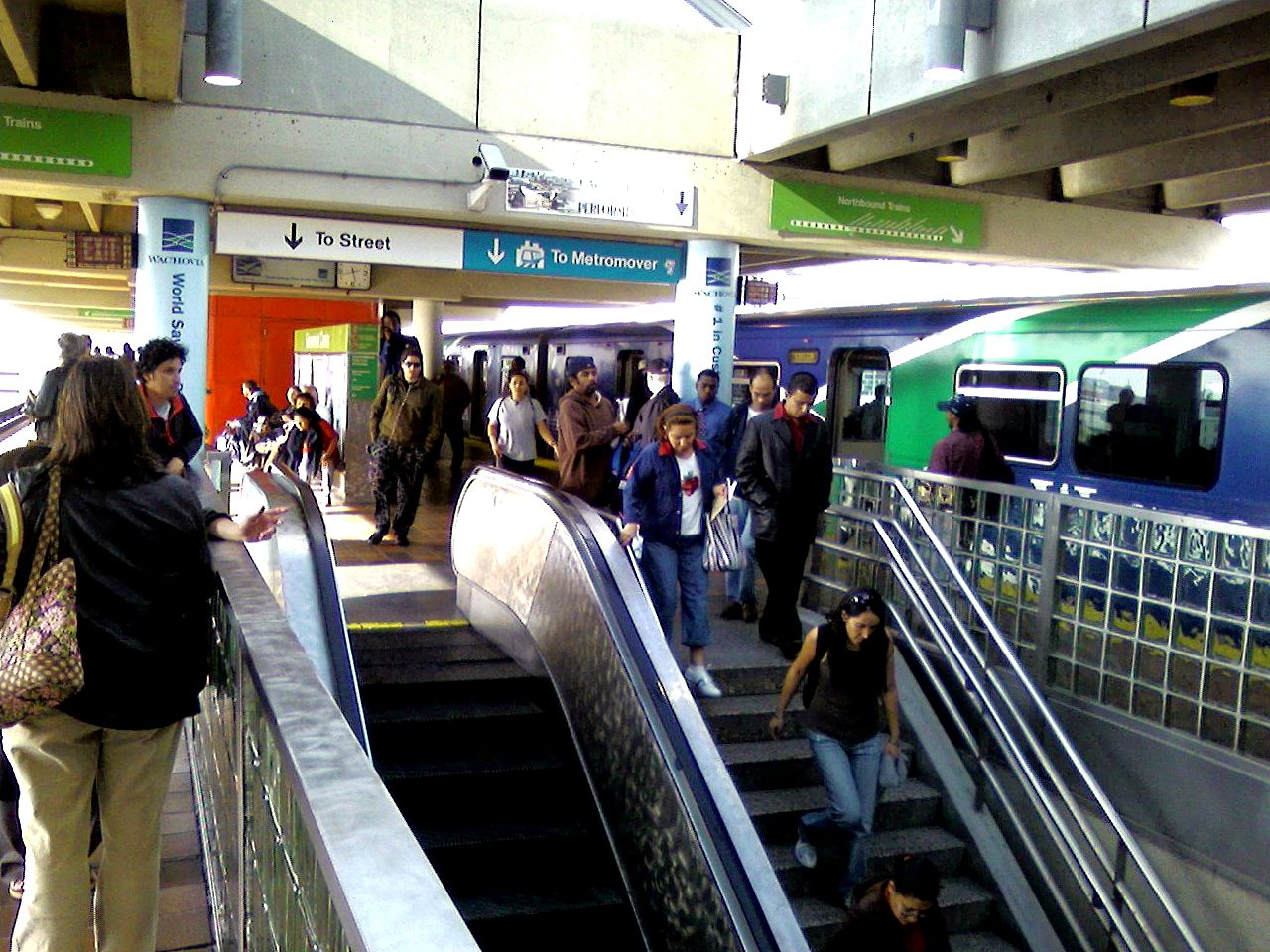
Passengers at Government Center

In February 2011, Miami-Dade Transit ridership totaled 336,067 passengers, including all Metrorail, Metromover and Metrobus lines. With a population of about 2.5 million in Miami-Dade County, Miami-Dade Transit accounts for 15% of the population's daily mode of transportation. Note: This figure does not include Tri-Rail, Miami's commuter rail operator.

Since the debut of Uber in the Miami area ridership has decreased each year, especially on the buses. By 2018, there were fewer riders than in 1999. In 2018, Metrorail and Metromover began to shut down earlier in the evening; the peak in-service fleet was cut by 4%; and service miles were cut by 2 million.

Annual passenger ridership

Year	Metrobus	Metrorail	Metromover	Total ridership
1995	61,516,400	14,445,400	4,168,600	80,130,400
1996	60,466,700	14,245,000	3,847,400	78,559,100
1997	62,344,200	13,923,700	4,175,200	80,443,100
1998	62,358,100	13,298,900	4,064,900	79,721,900
1999	64,252,400	13,769,400	4,069,700	82,091,500
2000	65,689,800	14,023,600	4,256,500	83,969,900
2001	65,067,100	13,678,000	4,951,800	83,696,900
2002	63,423,500	13,932,100	5,171,700	82,527,300
2003	65,046,900	14,318,500	6,978,900	86,344,300
2004	77,909,300	15,987,600	8,686,300	102,583,200
2005	78,373,000	17,001,000	8,537,500	103,911,500
2006	83,080,500	17,388,100	8,389,500	108,858,100
2007	84,218,300	17,672,000	8,838,800	110,729,100
2008	86,409,200*	19,075,900*	8,723,700	114,208,800*
2009	73,104,900	17,792,100	7,986,100	98,883,100
2010	70,942,000	17,438,400	8,121,000	96,501,400
2011	76,858,200	18,295,500	9,219,600*	104,373,300
2016	–	–	–	96,228,800
2018	–	–	–	81,600,000

* Record highs

Weekday passenger ridership averages

Year	Metrobus	Metrorail	Metromover	Total daily passengers
1998	207,048	44,871	13,269	265,188
1999	209,111	46,774	13,880	269,765
2000	212,927	47,256	14,383	274,566
2001	211,823	46,664	16,849	275,336
2002	204,941	47,064	16,444	268,449
2003	215,306	51,248	25,521	292,076
2004	234,109	55,294	28,192	317,595
2005	246,023	59,700	28,473	334,195
2006	259,375	58,358	27,042	344,775
2007	264,467 (record high)	59,708	28,058	352,233 (record high)
2008	259,018	63,710 (record high)	26,682	349,410
2009	233,858	59,992	25,883	319,733
2010	227,883	59,900	27,175	314,958
2011	245,358	62,559	29,775 (record high)	337,692

== See also ==
- Transportation in South Florida
- Tri-Rail
- List of United States rapid transit systems
- MetroConnect
