= Miami Riverwalk =

Pedestrian walkway in Miami, Florida

Coordinates: 25.7691°N 80.1952°W

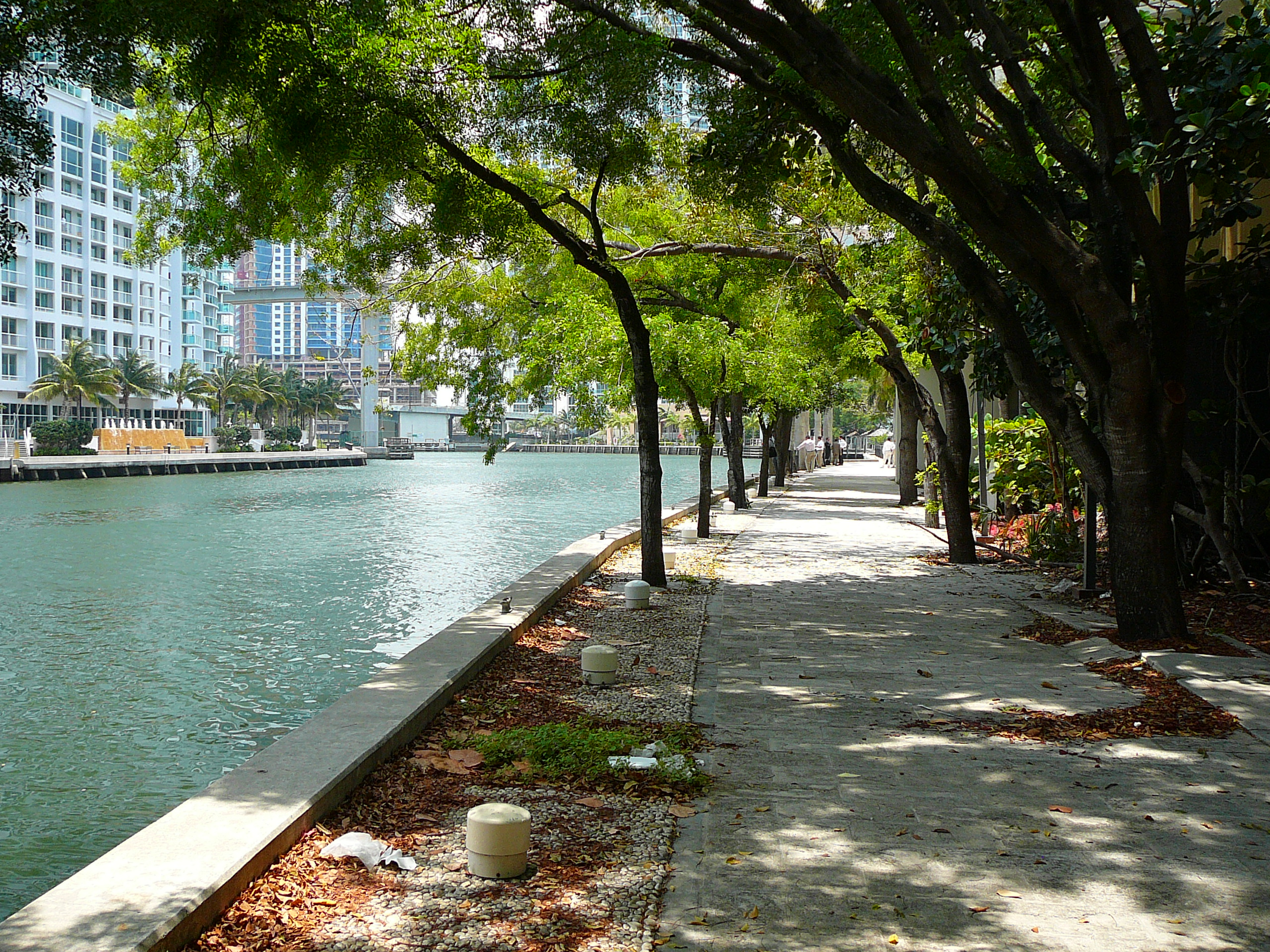
The Miami Riverwalk along the Miami River

The Miami Riverwalk is a pedestrian walkway located in Downtown Miami, Florida. It extends along the north side of the Miami River and the Biscayne Bay. It begins at Bayfront Park and ends one block west of the South West 2nd Street bridge where the path leads back to South West -North River Drive. The Riverwalk for years was blocked at two points along this route by developers, one block at the mouth of the river by a temporary sales office for the former Epic Residences & Hotel 2 Tower, now opened along the Aston Martin Residences. Another block was at the west side of the South Miami Avenue bridge by the One River Point Condo tower site at Riverfront. Similarly the Baywalk is blocked at several properties along Biscayne Bay on the north side of the downtown area. The Riverwalk passes under the Brickell Avenue Bridge, built in 1915, carrying Brickell Avenue, South Miami Avenue Bridge, Miami Metrorail, South West 2nd Street Bridge, and ends under the I-95 overpass. Since 2008, the Miami Riverwalk Festival has been held in November, which includes a lot of free and cultural entertainment. The Riverwalk is a part of a broader project known as the Miami River Greenway which also includes an incomplete greenway along the south side of the river.

== See also ==
- Miami River Greenway
