= South Dade Trail =

Rail trail in Florida, United States

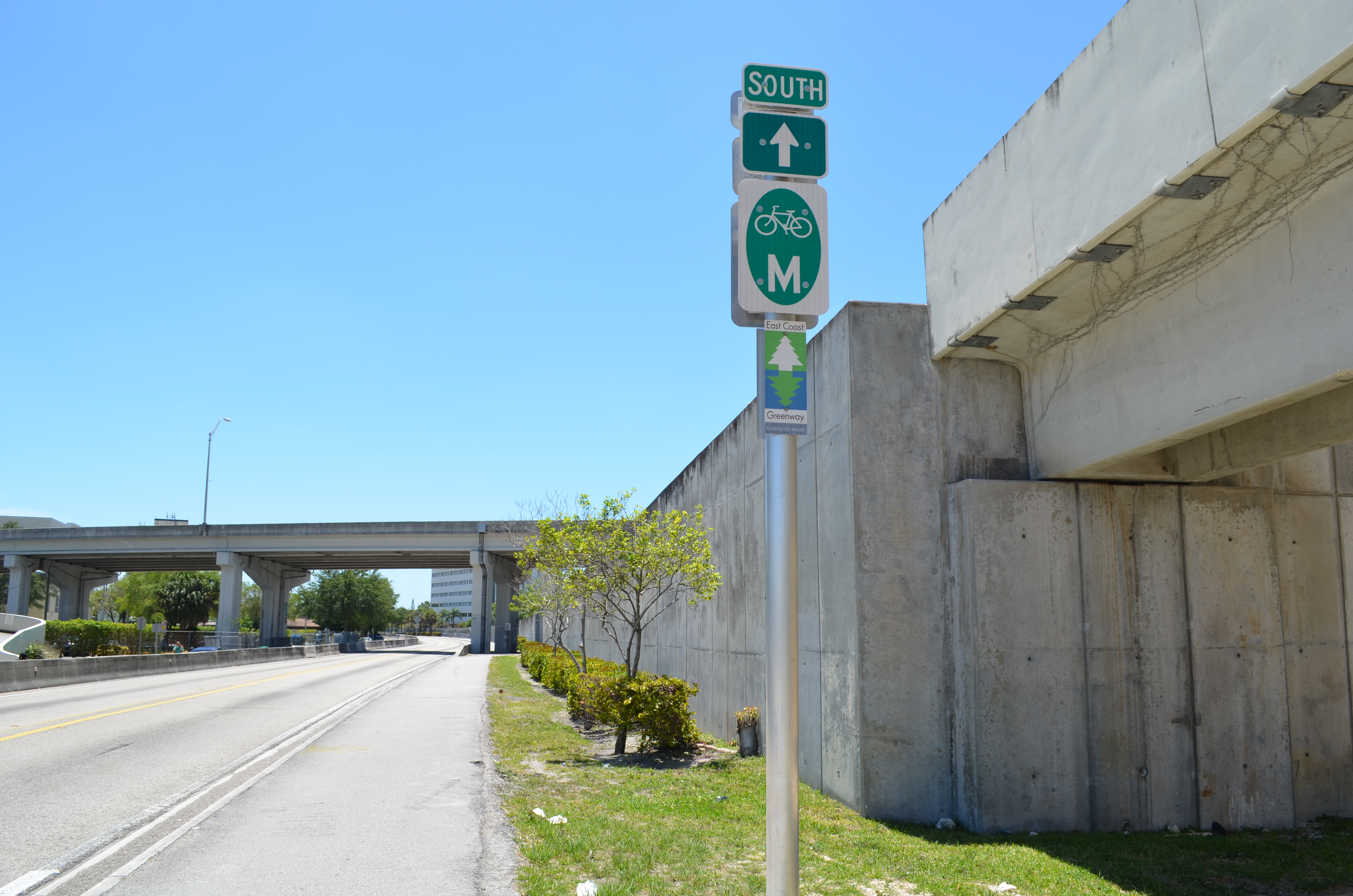
- The northern end of the South Dade Trail, looking south
- Length: 22 mi (35 km)
- Location: South Miami-Dade County, Florida, U.S.
- Trailheads: Dadeland South station 344 St Park & Ride, Florida City
- Use: Shared-use path
- Waymark: Bike Route M
- Surface: Asphalt
- Right of way: South Dade TransitWay
- Maintainer: Miami-Dade County
- Website: https://www.miamidade.gov/global/transportation/public-works/south-dade-trail.page

The South Dade Trail is a 22-mile-long (35 km) rail trail in southern Miami-Dade County. It begins in Dadeland and runs south alongside the South Dade TransitWay, a bus rapid transit corridor, to Florida City.

The northern trailhead is at Dadeland South Metrorail station, where the trail begins on the south side of Datran Drive, while the southern trailhead is at the 344th Street Park & Ride, the southern terminus of the South Dade TransitWay. At its northern end, the trail connects to the MetroPath, a 10-mile-long (16 km) shared-use path extending north to Brickell. MetroPath is scheduled to be fully converted into a linear park known as The Underline in 2026, running beneath the Metrorail guideway from Dadeland South station to Brickell station near the Miami River.

The trail opened in stages between 1997 and 2007 alongside construction of the TransitWay. Initially built as a basic side path for bicycles, it was substantially upgraded as part of the TransitWay reconstruction project that began in 2021. The rebuilt trail is a 10-foot-wide (3 m) shared-use path featuring new paving, lighting, landscaped areas, and shade trees, increasing the corridor's tree canopy by approximately 48%. Additional amenities include seating, water bottle filling stations, trash and recycling bins, and dog waste stations. County officials cited the Atlanta Beltline as an inspiration for the upgraded design.

The South Dade Trail forms part of the East Coast Greenway, a 3,000-mile (4,800 km) trail network connecting Maine to Florida, and is a major segment of the Miami LOOP, an initiative by the Rails-to-Trails Conservancy to create a countywide network of rail trails promoting micromobility in Miami-Dade County.
