= South Dade TransitWay =

Bus rapid transit line in Miami-Dade County, Florida

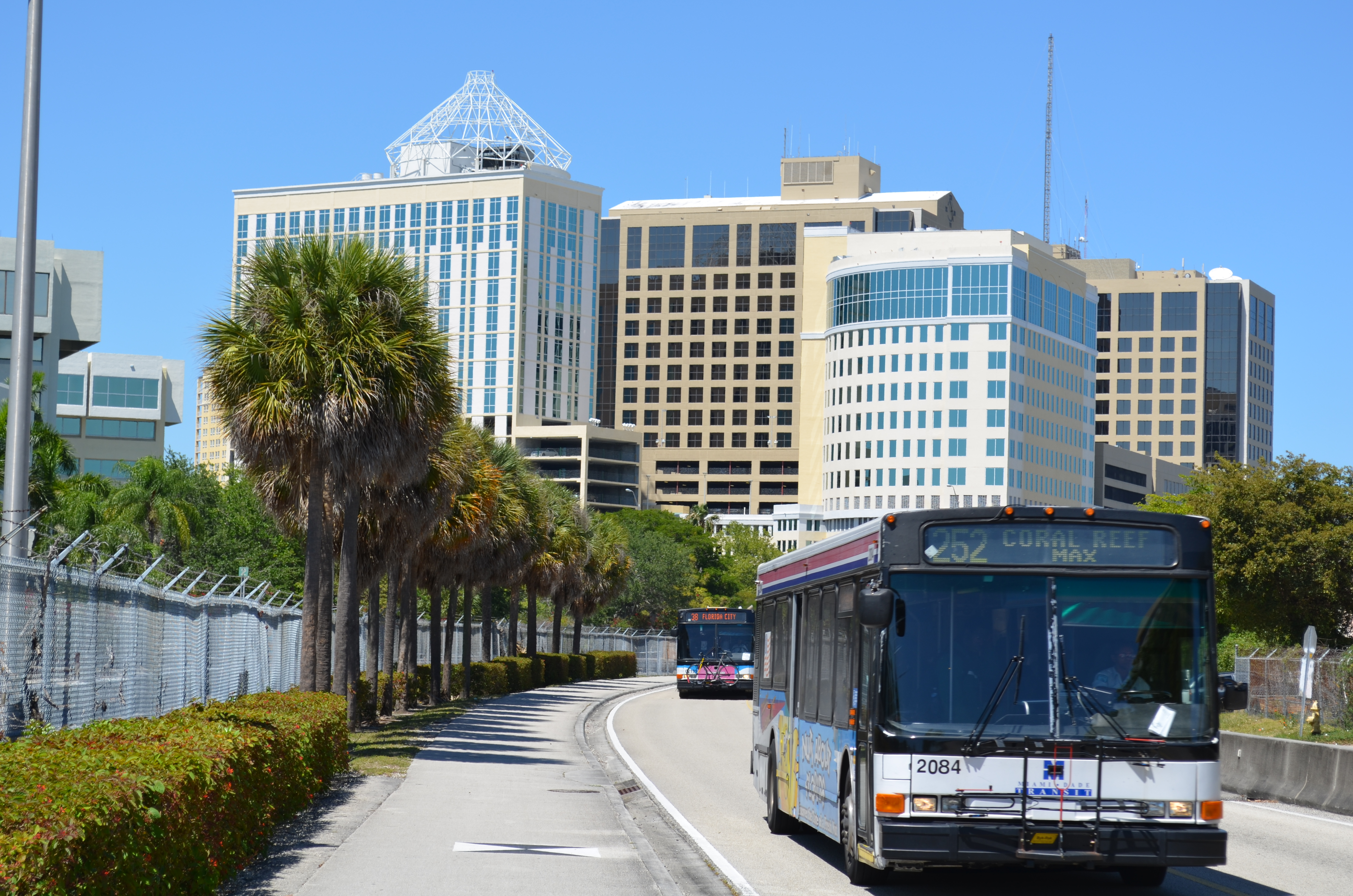
- Southbound buses near the TransitWay's northern terminus

Overview
- Line number: 601 (BRT); 602 (local)
- Locale: Southern Miami-Dade County, Florida
- Termini: Dadeland South; SW 344th St
- Stations: 16
- Website: miamidade.gov/metroexpress

Service
- Type: Bus rapid transit
- System: Miami-Dade Transit
- Depot(s): South Dade Transit Operations Center
- Rolling stock: New Flyer XE60
- Daily ridership: 601: 5,469; 602: 4,064; (as of Nov. 2025)

History
- Opened: February 3, 1997
- Last extension: December 16, 2007
- BRT stations opened: October 27, 2025

Technical
- Line length: 20 mi (32 km)
- Character: At-grade with transit signal priority

The South Dade TransitWay (originally named the South Miami-Dade Busway) is a bus rapid transit (BRT) corridor, or busway, serving southern Miami-Dade County, Florida, running approximately 20 miles (32 km) between Dadeland South Metrorail station and Southwest 344th Street in Florida City, parallel to U.S. Route 1 (South Dixie Highway) along a former Florida East Coast Railway right-of-way.

Service began on February 3, 1997, on an 8.3-mile (13.4 km) segment between the Dadeland South station of Metrorail and Southplace Mall (then known as Cutler Ridge Mall). The corridor was extended 5 miles (8 km) to Southwest 264th Street on April 24, 2005, followed by a final 6.5-mile (10.5 km) extension to Southwest 344th Street in Florida City on December 16, 2007. Between 2021 and 2025, the corridor was rebuilt with dedicated bus rapid transit stations and supporting infrastructure, supplementing the original busway stops.

== History ==
Service began on February 3, 1997, on an 8.3-mile (13.4 km) segment between Dadeland South station of Metrorail and Southplace Mall (then Cutler Ridge Mall). The busway was constructed parallel to U.S. Route 1 (South Dixie Highway) on a former Florida East Coast Railway right-of-way by the Florida Department of Transportation at a cost of US$21 million (equivalent to $42.1 million in 2025), after purchasing the land from the Florida East Coast Railway in 1988 for $35.8 million (equivalent to $97.5 million in 2025). The line included two park-and-ride lots at Cutler Ridge Mall and Southwest 152nd Street and incorporated traffic signal preemption. Despite these measures, buses had to slow to 15 miles per hour (24 km/h) after more than 100 accidents involving transit buses, including four fatalities. End-to-end travel times still reached as little as 25 minutes, matching the fastest speeds of cars on the parallel highway. The corridor was served by a mix of local and express Metrobus routes.

The line was extended 5 miles (8.0 km) to Southwest 264th Street on April 24, 2005, and the final 6.5-mile (10.5 km) southern extension to Southwest 344th Street in Florida City opened on December 16, 2007. Several park-and-ride lots were added, and the total budget for the 11.5-mile extension was approximately $105 million.

In 2018, under the administration of then–Miami-Dade County Mayor Carlos Giménez, the county opted to upgrade the corridor to a bus rapid transit (BRT) system rather than pursue a rail extension, citing ridership levels considered insufficient to justify rail and the high cost of constructing a rail guideway. The decision drew criticism from residents who favored rail-based transit. Construction of the South Dade TransitWay reconstruction project, including new BRT stations and supporting infrastructure, began in early 2021 under the Miami-Dade Department of Transportation and Public Works and was completed on October 27, 2025, at a total cost of approximately US$368 million. The rebuilt corridor was designed to reduce peak-period commuting times—northbound in the mornings and southbound in the afternoons—by roughly half compared with automobile travel on U.S. Route 1.

In the early months of Metro Express service, some riders reported that buses still stopped frequently at traffic signals despite the preemption system, and nearby residents noted that the crossing gate arms, caused delays of 10–15 minutes for vehicles entering U.S. Route 1. The Miami-Dade County Department of Transportation and Public Works implemented a 90-day "optimization" period to refine operations, signal timing, and overall system performance.

== Operations ==
=== Services ===
The South Dade TransitWay underwent major service changes with the launch of Metro Express service in October 2025. Following the restructuring, the corridor is served exclusively by two routes:

- Route 601 – Metro Express serves only the 14 bus rapid transit stations and two terminals along the TransitWay. It operates seven days per week, with service as frequent as every 7.5 minutes during weekday peak periods, every 15 minutes during off-peak weekday periods, and every 30 minutes on weekends. End-to-end travel time is approximately 60 to 70 minutes, depending on the level of priority given to buses.
- Route 602 – TransitWay Local serves the 32 local bus stops and two terminals along the corridor and does not stop at the BRT stations. It operates seven days per week, 24 hours a day, with an end-to-end travel time of approximately 78 minutes.

=== Stations ===
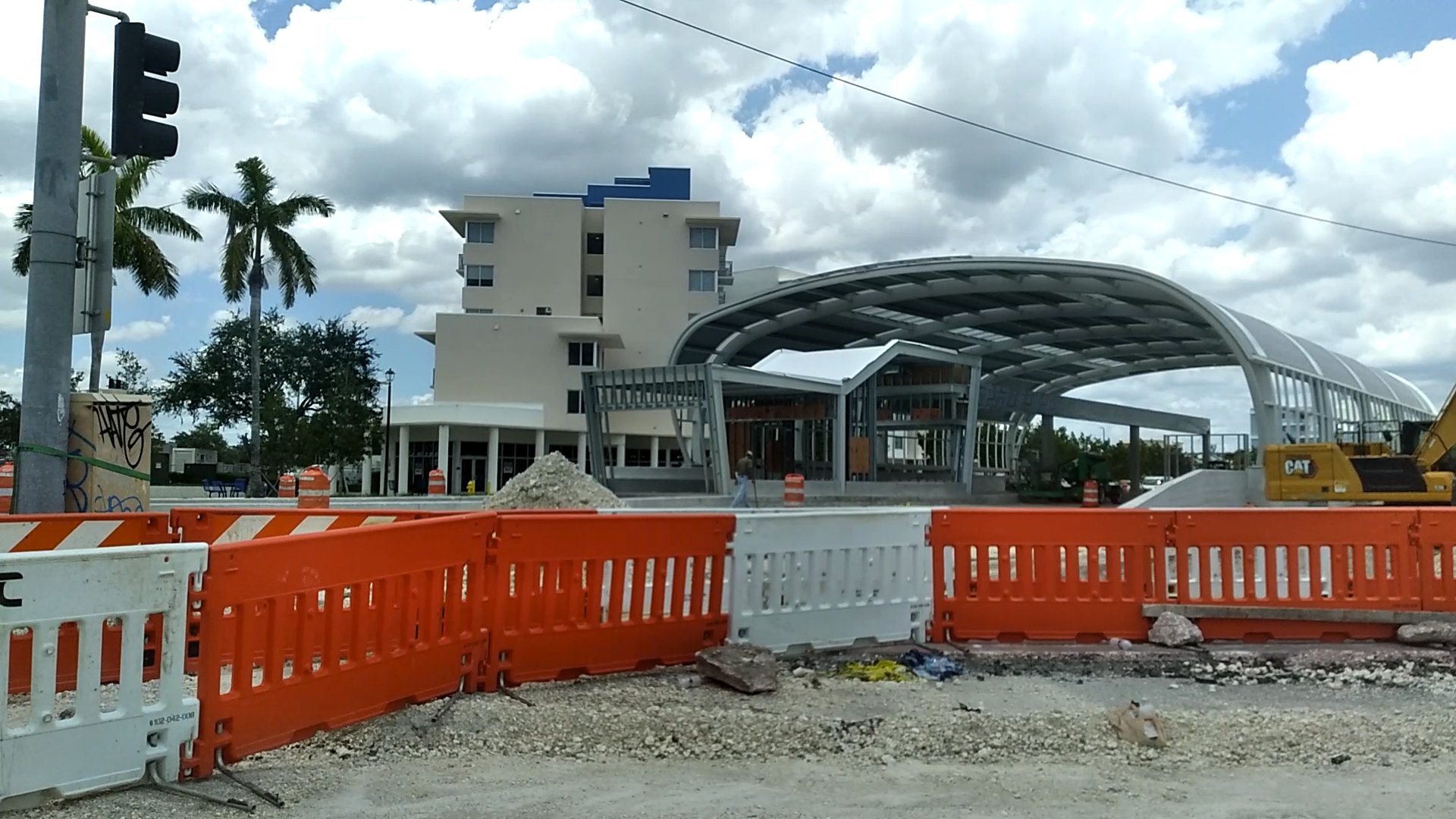
Bauer Drive station under construction

The 14 bus rapid transit stations feature vault-style, hangar-like canopies that provide full weather protection. Stations are designed with raised platforms for level boarding and incorporate off-board fare collection, with fare vending machines and fare gates located at station entrances. Beyond the fare-controlled entrance is an air-conditioned vestibule leading to a large island platform. The features of the stations enable all-door boarding through both the front and rear doors of buses, reducing dwell times and improving operational efficiency.

The stations were designed to allow for potential future conversion to rail service, although the platforms would need to be made taller and longer.

As part of the project, the existing bus stops along the corridor, which continue to be served by Route 602 TransitWay Local, were renovated, and ticket vending machines were added.

=== Signal priority and crossings ===
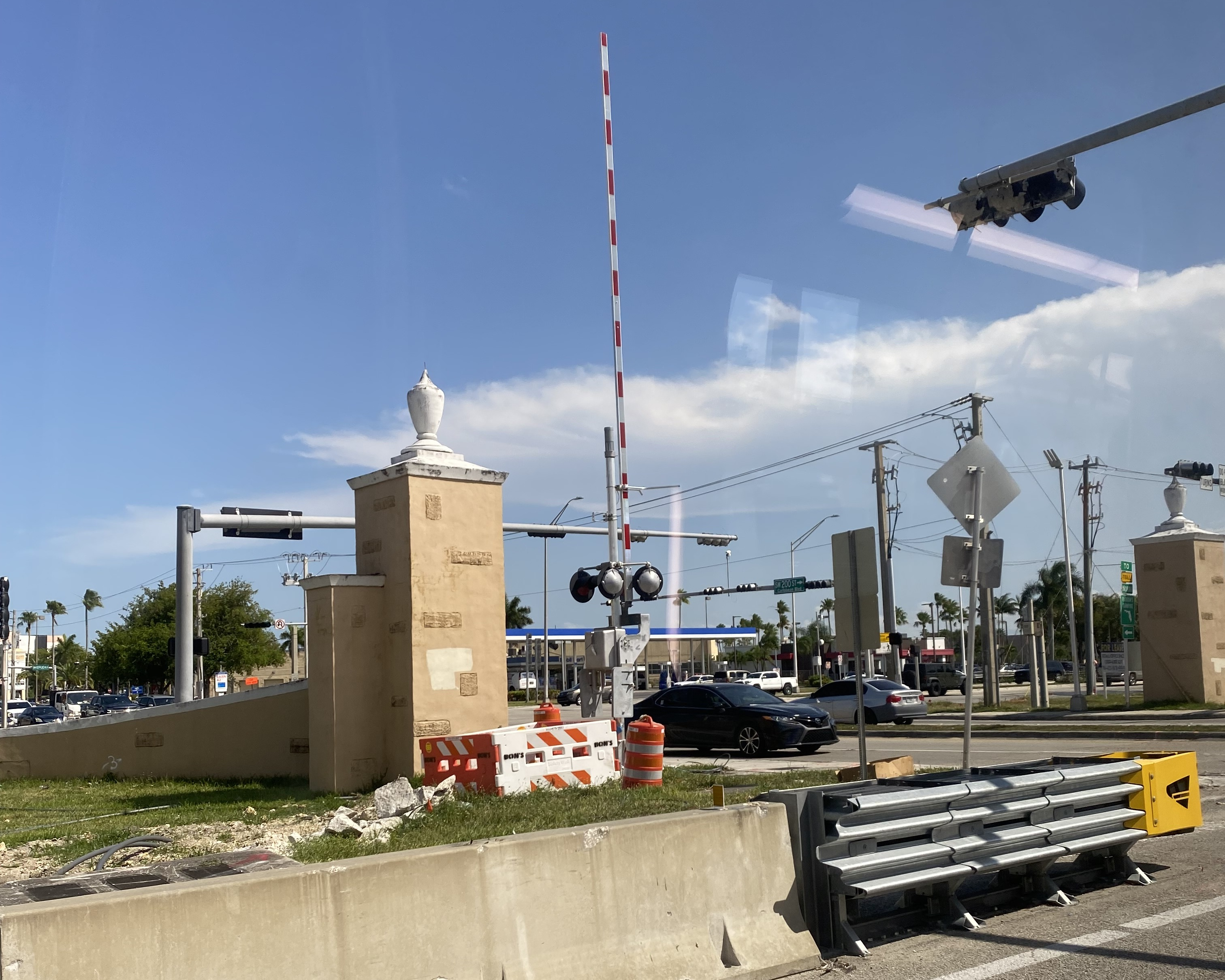
Crossing gate arm at the SW 200th St intersection

To improve travel times and reliability, the TransitWay incorporates traffic signal preemption technology at most intersections along the corridor. Railroad-style crossing gate arms with integrated warning lights were installed at many intersections to maintain separation between express buses and cross traffic. The use of traditional railroad bells has been minimized to reduce noise impacts on adjacent neighborhoods.

During weekday peak periods—6 to 9 a.m. northbound and 3 to 6 p.m. southbound—Metro Express buses are intended to receive continuous priority, allowing non-stop travel between stations and reducing end-to-end travel times from approximately 70 minutes to about 60 minutes. Outside of peak periods, buses continue to receive signal priority over general traffic, though they may still encounter red lights.

=== Fleet ===
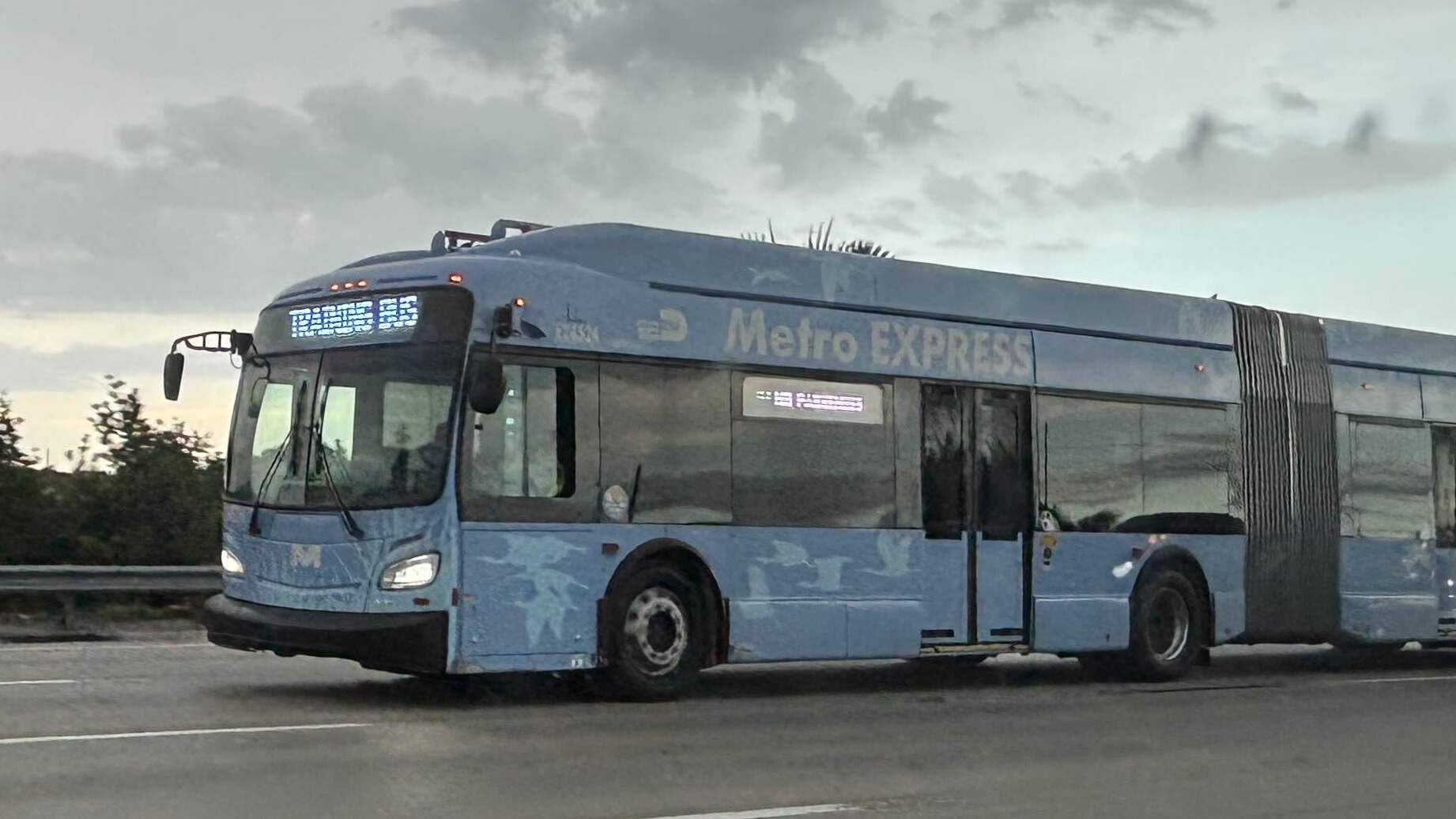
MetroExpress bus during a training run on Florida's Turnpike.

The TransitWay is served by a fleet of 60 all-electric articulated express buses procured at an additional cost of approximately US$96 million. With their introduction, the corridor became the longest all-electric bus rapid transit system in the United States. The fleet consists of 60-foot New Flyer Xcelsior battery-electric buses equipped with left-side doors and small bridge plates for boarding at the raised BRT island platforms.

The buses are operated and maintained at the South Dade Transit Operations Center, constructed as part of the TransitWay project near Homestead Air Reserve Base. The facility is the first all-electric bus maintenance and charging center in Miami-Dade County and is designed to support the TransitWay fleet, with capacity to service and charge up to 100 battery-electric buses.

== Bicycle facilities ==
A 10-foot-wide (3.0 m) shared-use path called the South Dade Trail runs the length of the South Dade TransitWay, providing a continuous north–south corridor for cyclists and pedestrians. While a more basic "side path" for bicycles existed alongside the original busway, it was significantly upgraded as part of the TransitWay reconstruction project, including new paving, landscaped areas, and the addition of shade trees.

At the north end of the TransitWay corridor, the South Dade Trail connects to the MetroPath, a 10-mile-long (16 km) shared-use path heading north to Brickell, which is scheduled to be fully converted into a linear park called The Underline in 2026.

Each bus rapid transit station includes designated bicycle amenities, including standard bike racks and a self-service bicycle repair stand. Stations also feature a separate secured bicycle storage area, along with designated parking for shared bicycles and electric scooters. In addition, TransitWay buses are equipped with two interior bicycle racks.
