= Miami River Greenway =

The Miami River Greenway is an urban greenway project in Miami, Florida located along both banks of the Miami River. The plan is for it to eventually form an uninterrupted walkway from the mouth of the river in Downtown Miami to the Dolphin Expressway near the Civic Center area, and in the long term all the way to Miami International Airport. On the north bank the walkway is currently known as the Miami Riverwalk which currently extends beyond the river through Bayfront Park along Biscayne Bay where it is known as the Bay Walk. Plans are to extend this as far north and south as the Julia Tuttle and Rickenbacker Causeways, respectively.

== See also ==
- Miami Riverwalk
- The Underline
