= Miami River (Florida) =

River in Florida, United States

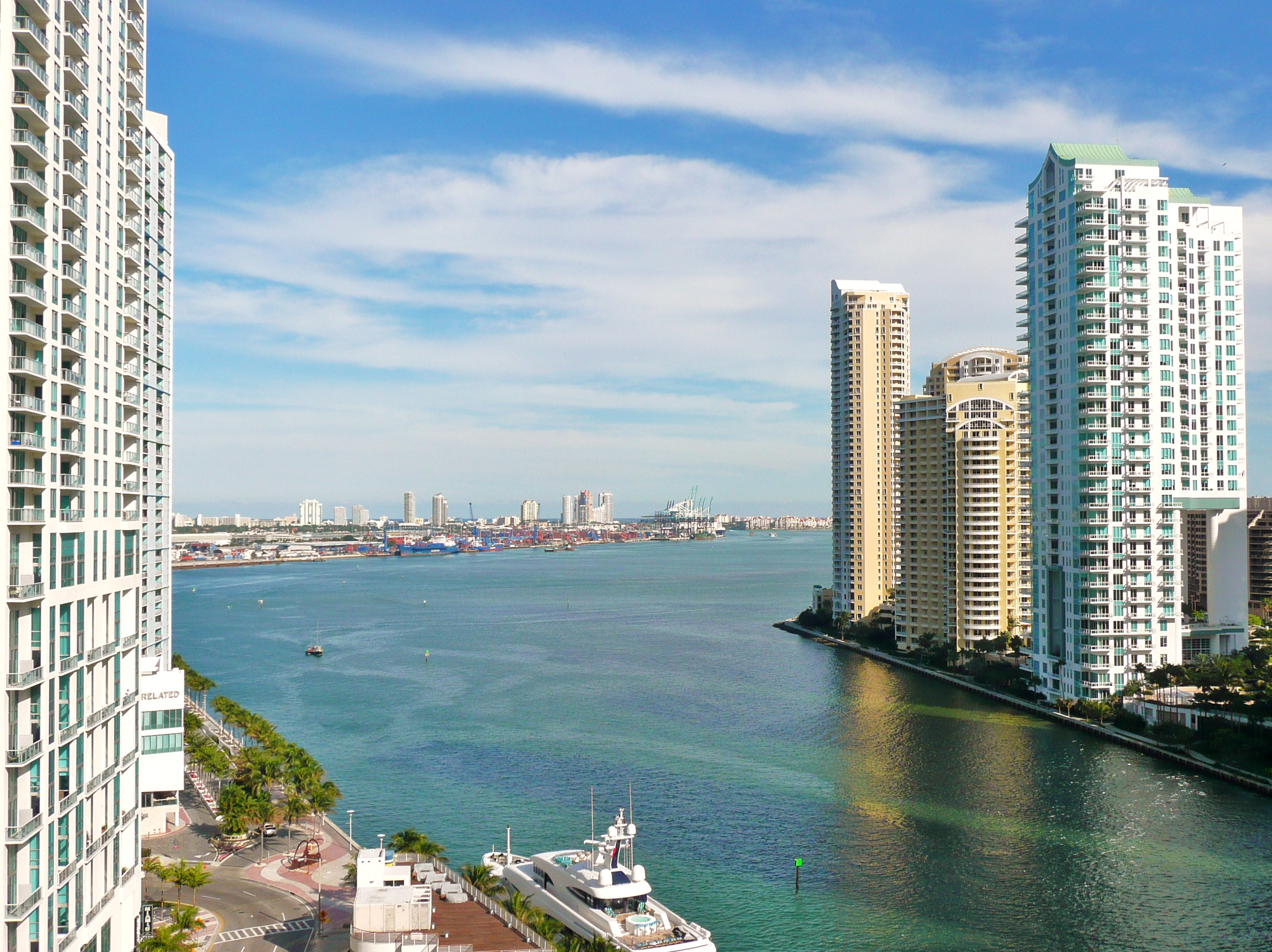
- The mouth of the Miami River at Brickell Key

Location
- Country: United States

Physical characteristics
- Source
  - location: The Everglades
  - elevation: Sea level
- Mouth
  - location: Brickell Point
  - coordinates: 25°46′14″N 80°11′06″W
- Length: 5.5 mi (8.9 km)
- Basin size: 2,800 mi^{2} (7,300 km^{2})
- Discharge
  - average: 50 cu ft/s (1.4 m^{3}/s)

The Miami River is a river in the U.S. state of Florida that drains out of the Everglades and runs through the city of Miami, including the downtown area. The 5.5-mi-long (8.9 km) river flows from the terminus of the Miami Canal at Miami International Airport to Biscayne Bay. It was originally a natural river inhabited at its mouth by the Tequesta Native Americans, but it was dredged and is now polluted throughout its route through Miami-Dade County. The mouth of the river is home to the Port of Miami and many other businesses, whose pressure to maintain it has helped to improve the river's condition.

== Etymology ==
Although the name is widely believed to derive from a Native American word that means "sweet water", the earliest mention of the name comes from Hernando de Escalante Fontaneda, a captive of Native Americans in southern Florida for 17 years, when he referred to what is now Lake Okeechobee as the "Lake of Mayaimi, which is called Mayaimi because it is very large". The Mayaimi people were named after the lake around which they lived. Spanish records include the cacique of "Maimi" in a group of 280 Florida Native Americans who arrived in Cuba in 1710. Reports on a Spanish mission to the Biscayne Bay area in 1743 mention "Maymies" or "Maimíes" living nearby. The river has also been known as the Garband River, Rio Ratones, Fresh Water River, Sweetwater River, and Lemon River. It has been known as the Miami River since the Second Seminole War of 1835–42.

== Natural river ==
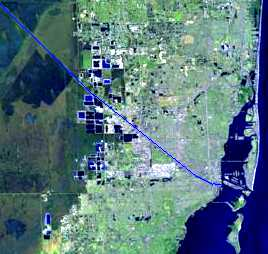
Map of Miami, Florida with the river in blue

In its original natural state, the river started at rapids formed by water from the Everglades flowing over a rocky ledge four miles (6.4 km) from its mouth. Frederick H. Gerdes of the United States Coast Survey reported in 1849 that "[f]rom the upper falls to near its entrance into Key Biscayne Bay… water in the Glades was 6 feet 2.5 inches (1.892 m) above low tide." The rapids were removed when the Miami Canal was dredged in an attempt to drain the wetland.

The river divided into a North Fork and a South Fork about three miles (4.8 km) above its mouth. Each fork extended only one mile (1.6 km) to rapids marking the edge of the Everglades. The North Fork had a greater flow and higher drop over its rapids. A tributary was 1-1/2 miles (2.4 km) above the mouth of the river on the north side, called Wagner Creek, which was about 2 mi (3.2 km) long. The Miami River was also fed by several springs, including some in the bed of the river. The river's flow was variable, and in times of drought, the river did not flow.

== History ==
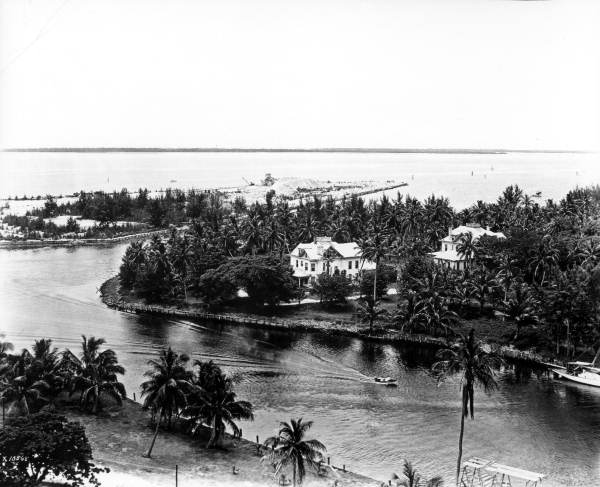
The mouth of the Miami River at Brickell Point, August 1935

The earliest known inhabitants of the area around the Miami River were the Tequestas. Their major town at the time of first European contact was on the north bank of the river near the mouth. Before the intensive development of Miami in the 20th century, mounds built by the Tequesta were located along the river. Spanish missions were briefly established beside the river in 1567–70 and in 1743, but the area was abandoned when Spain turned Florida over to Britain in 1765.

The area around the Miami River attracted settlers throughout the 19th century, with the major exception of the years of the Seminole Wars, but those years had little effect on the river. The United States Army attempted to dig a channel through the sandbar at the mouth of the river in 1856, but stopped when the army decided that Fort Dallas would not be made permanent.

=== Dredging and pollution ===
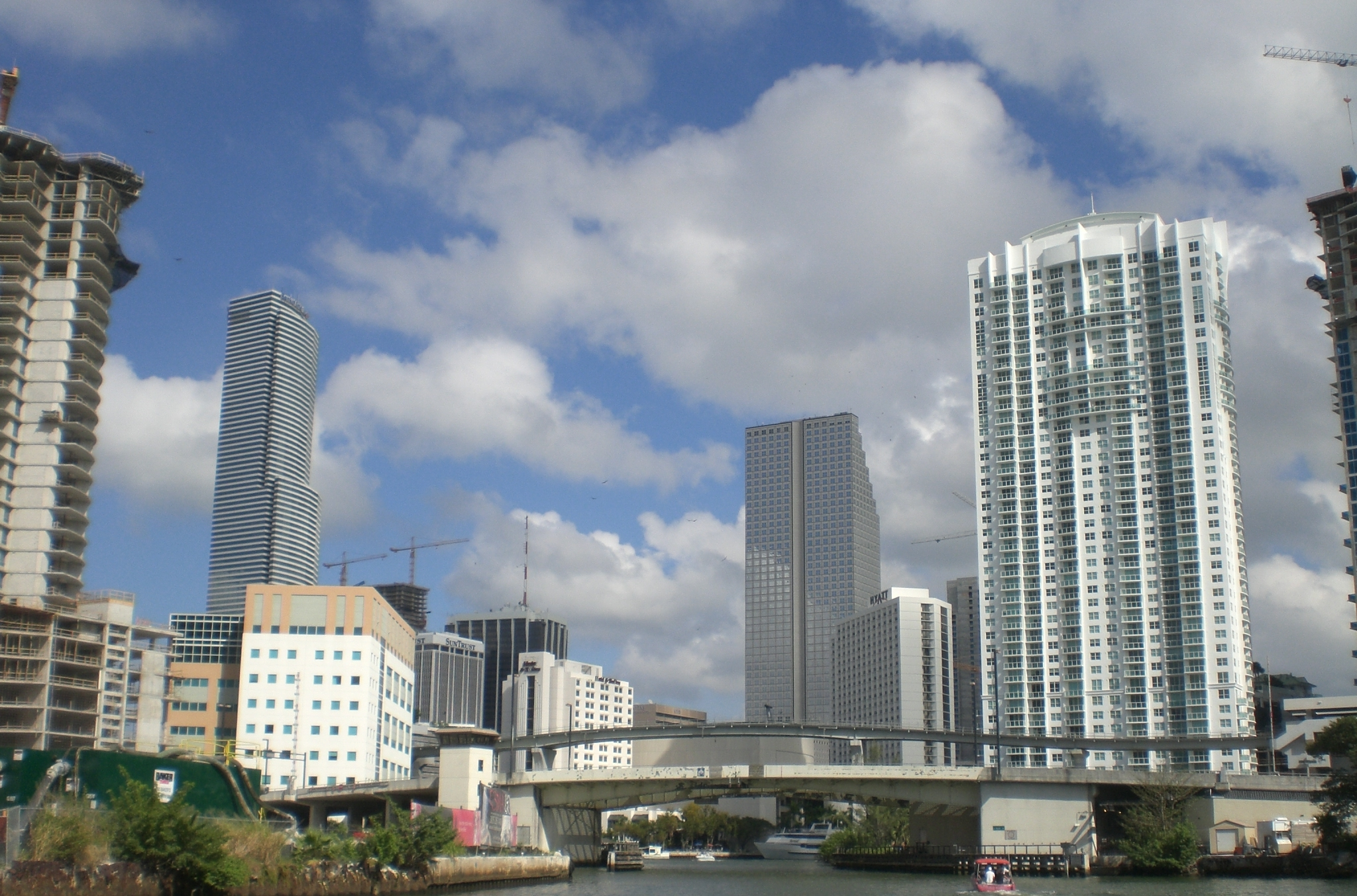
The Miami River in 2007

Modification of the river began in earnest with the arrival of the Florida East Coast Railway in Miami in 1896. Much dredging and filling occurred along the river. The rapids at the head of the South Fork were removed in 1908. From 1909 to 1912, the Miami Canal was dug, bypassing the rapids at the head of the North Fork. The canal was dammed off from the river for most of the construction period. When the canal was opened to the river in March 1912, large amounts of Everglades muck and finely ground stone from the dredging were washed down the river, silting it. As a result, the lower river had to be dredged three times in two years.

Dredging of the river and of the canals connecting to the river continued into the 1930s. Deepening the Miami River (and other streams and canals draining into Biscayne Bay), as well as the drainage of the Everglades, which was a major purpose of the dredging, led to saltwater intrusion in the area, ultimately forcing the abandonment of drinking-water wells on several occasions. By the 1940s, dams were being installed on the canals leading into the Miami River to prevent salt water from traveling inland.

The Miami River also became polluted. In 1897, Miami's first sewer line started emptying directly into the river. By the 1950s, 29 sewers were dumping untreated sewage into the river. Miami-Dade County constructed a sewage treatment plant on Virginia Key in the 1950s and connected sewer lines to it, routing the raw sewage away from the river.

=== Artifact discoveries ===
At a site next to the river, archeologists in 2023 discovered numerous artifacts, "dating back to the dawn of human civilization 7,000 years ago." The discoveries included prehistoric tools and preserved animals and plants. Development of a residential property was put on hold during legal proceedings to determine if the site would be preserved as a protected archeological site.

== Commercial use ==
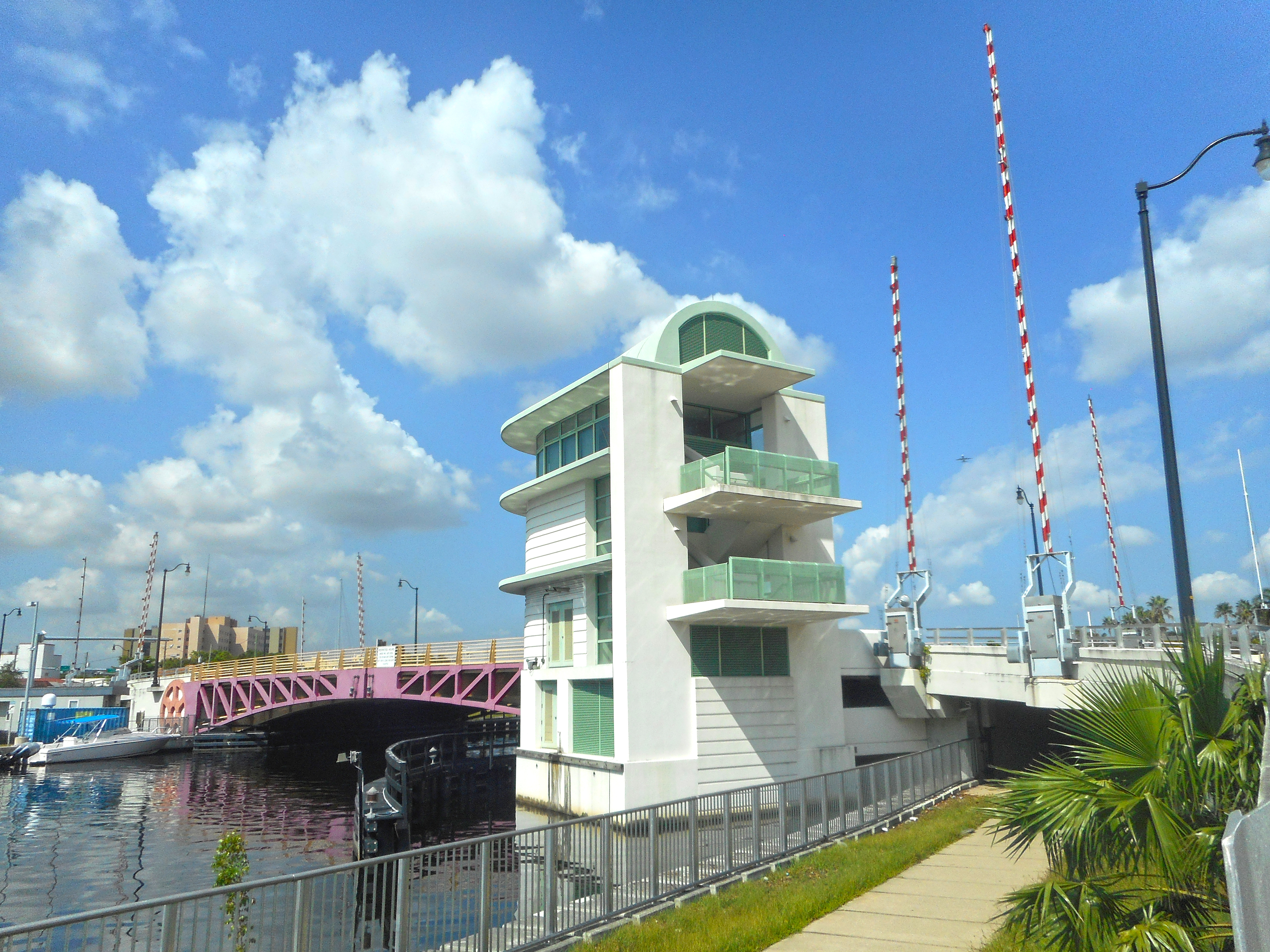
Miami River NW 5th Street Bridge

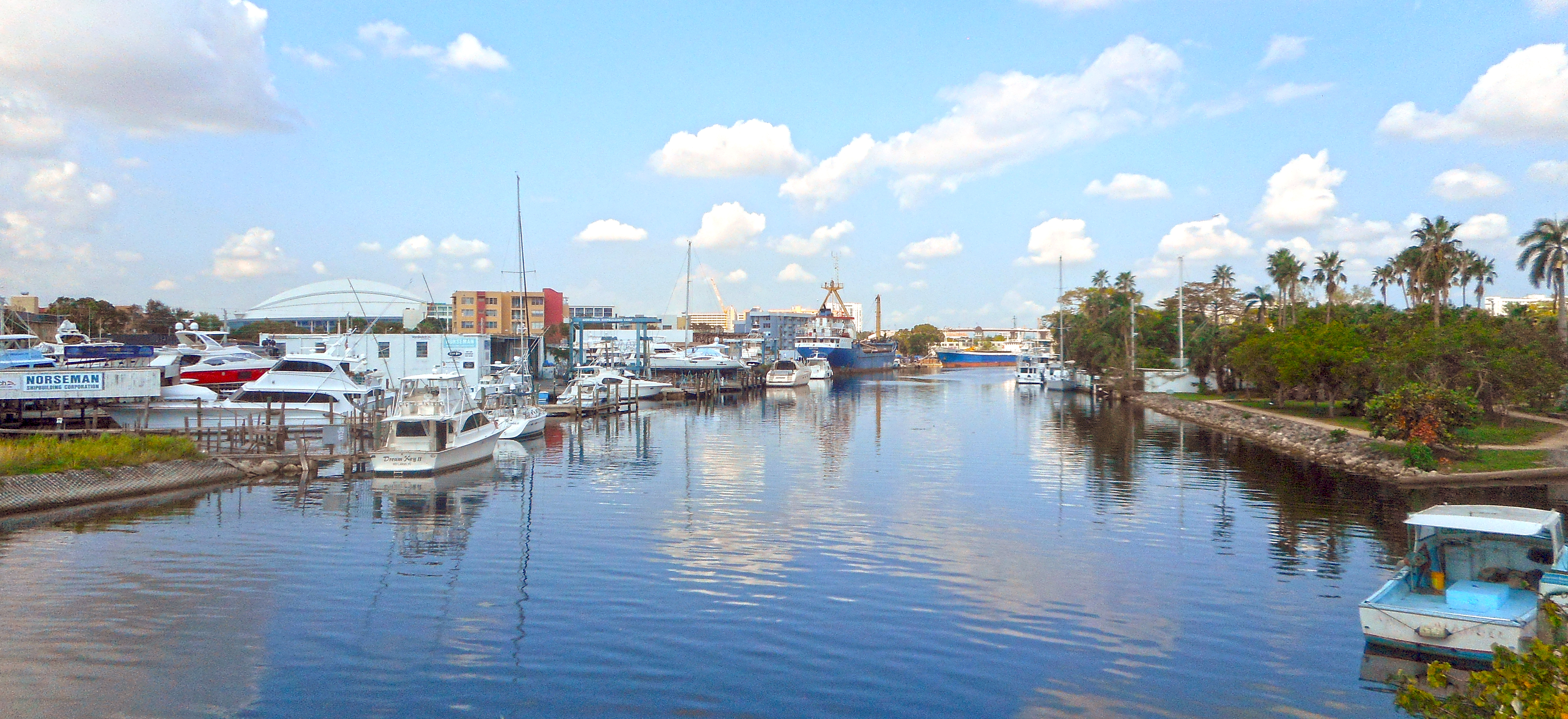
View upriver of the Miami River from NW 5th Street Bridge

The Miami River is likely the shortest working river in the United States. The Center for Urban and Environmental Solutions reported in 2008: "Waterborne commerce through the Miami River port doubled between an annual level of about 250,000 short tons in the early 1970s to about 500,000 in the early years of the new century. Foreign trade accounts for most of the commerce through the Miami River Port. Exports dominate the Port's commerce, accounting for over 75% of the total. In the 1970s, exports had averaged 56% of the total. Most of the Miami River's foreign trade is with the nearby countries of the Caribbean, especially the Dominican Republic, Haiti, and the Bahamas. This reflects the suitability of the Miami River for shallow-draft vessels, which serve the many shallow draft ports in the Caribbean."

The Miami River has long been home to many small cargo terminals, where smaller ships (up to about 230 feet (70 m) in length) call to load cargo, most of which is destined for ports in the Bahamas and various Caribbean nations. It is also an area where all manner of contraband—illegal drugs, undocumented immigrants—have been discharged into the United States. Because of continuing efforts by the United States Coast Guard, U.S. Customs and Border Protection (CBP), DEA and other agencies, the illicit trade has been minimized in recent years.

Although the part of the river from Northwest 36th Street to its mouth is still polluted, this has been mitigated considerably by rigid enforcement of both international and U.S. laws regarding discharge of oil and sewage by ships, as well as of laws addressing industrial dumping. The muddy bottom, however, is still reported to contain undesirable substances in significant quantities.

In years past, many vessels docked in the river at the ends of their last voyages were abandoned and sank alongside the docks, creating eyesores and hazards for navigation. Those derelicts have been removed.

Invoking the authority of Port State Control, the U.S. Coast Guard strongly enforces the numerous international and national regulations regarding safety equipment, construction, maintenance and manning of ships entering all U.S. ports, including the Miami River, and virtually eliminating the many dangerously substandard vessels that had sailed from the U.S. in previous years.

In recent years, realizing they had common interests, various business entities along the river formed the Miami River Marine Group. The group works closely with local law enforcement agencies, the U.S. Coast Guard, ICE, and others to maintain clear channels of communication and cooperation. It now acts much as one port with numerous port facilities and support entities such as agents, surveyors, consultants, naval architects and engineers, and ship and machinery repair businesses.

Many of the ships sailing from the Miami River carry cargo to ports in Haiti including Port-au-Prince, Miragoâne, Cap-Haïtien, Port-de-Paix, Saint-Marc, Gonaïves, and Jacmel. Their cargo typically consist of dry foodstuffs such as beans and rice, canned goods, clothing, household goods and appliances, and used cars, trucks, and buses.

In times past, some of the cargo terminals on the river were areas of lawlessness. Law enforcement and regulatory agencies have eliminated most of that sort of activity. When the International Ship and Port Security Code and the U.S. Maritime Transportation Act of 2002 came into force (and in the prior runup) on July 1, 2004, most opportunities for crime were eliminated.

== Redevelopment ==
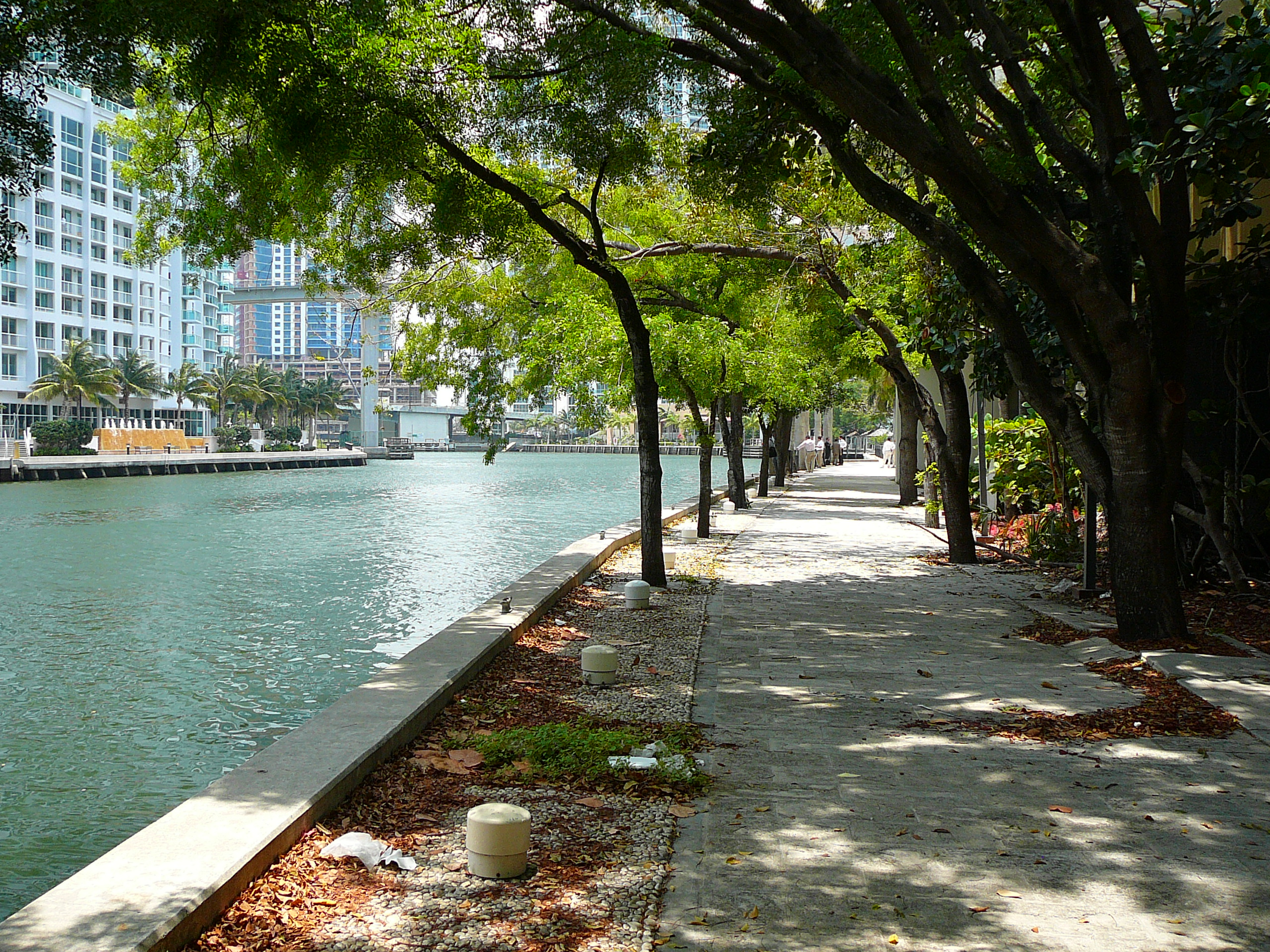
The new Miami Riverwalk as of May 2008, where pedestrians can walk along the river, dine at cafes and shop at boutiques

Some of the terminals and other business related to cargo shipping on the "lower end" of the river near downtown Miami have been eliminated or moved farther upstream because of illicit shipping activities. The "lower end" of the river has been the subject of much renovation and building of high rise offices, hotels, and living structures.

A number of residential and mixed-use projects have been constructed along the Miami River. They include Latitude on the River, Mint at Riverfront, Neo Vertika, River Oaks Marina and Tower, and Terrazas Miami.

Starting in the 2000s, two urban greenway projects known as the Miami Riverwalk and Miami River Greenway were started.

== See also ==
- History of Miami
