= Southland Mall (Miami) =

Shopping mall in Miami-Dade County, Florida, U.S.

Coordinates: 25.574392°N 80.368735°W

Southplace Mall
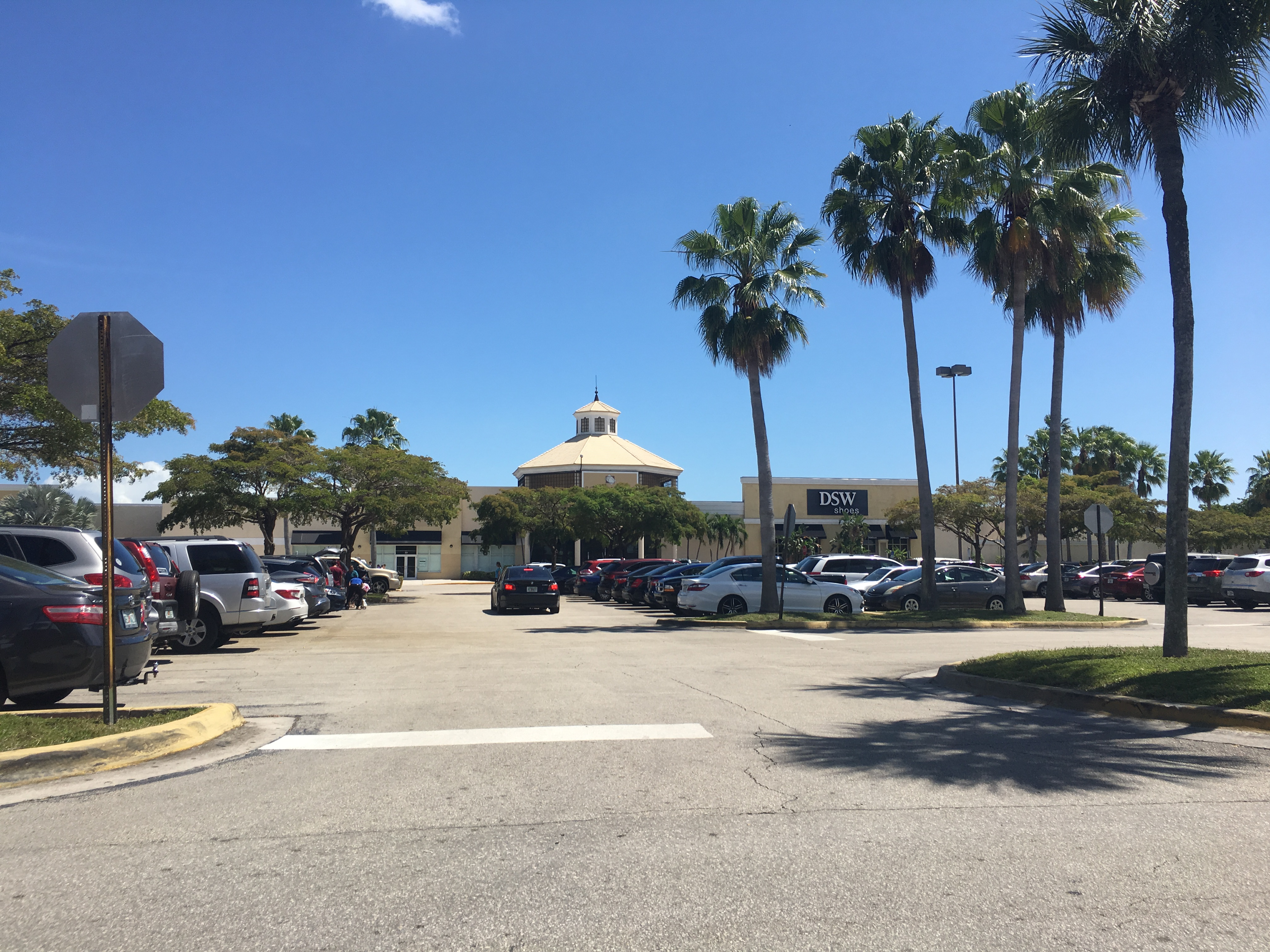
- Southland Mall, March 2019
- Location: Cutler Bay, Florida
- Address: 20505 South Dixie Highway
- Opened: 1960
- Renovated: Completion Date: Q3 2027
- Manager: Urban Retail Properties
- Owner: Gumberg Asset Management Group
- Num. of stores: 154
- Num. of anchor tenants: 4 (2 open, 2 vacant)
- Floor area: 986,514 square feet (91,650.1 m^{2})
- Floors: 1 (2 in Macy's)
- Website: https://www.mysouthlandmall.com/

Southplace Mall, originally known as Cutler Ridge Mall and Southland Mall, is a regional mall in Cutler Bay, Florida. It opened in 1978 as an extension of the Cutler Ridge Shopping Center, which itself was opened in 1960 (shortly after its "grand reopening", Cutler Ridge Mall moniker was subsequently applied to the entire shopping center complex). Subsequent additions extended the mall in the early to mid-1980s.

== History ==
The original shopping center opened in 1960, anchored by Food Fair (Pantry Pride) and Richard's, which later became Burdines. In 1978, it was expanded into a full mall anchored by JCPenney, Jordan Marsh and Lord & Taylor, the last of which opened in 1982. Lord & Taylor closed in 1990 and became Mervyns in 1991. Pantry Pride became a Phar-Mor.

The mall was nearly destroyed by Hurricane Andrew in 1992. When Cutler Ridge Mall reopened the following year, none of the original Cutler Ridge Shopping Center (except Sears) remained standing. The owner, Simon DeBartolo (now Simon Property Group) declared bankruptcy in the late 1990s and ownership was transferred to lender Ocwen Federal Bank. Jordan Marsh became an auxiliary Burdines store for a short time, but after the mall was damaged by the hurricane, Burdines consolidated to the former Jordan Marsh. The former Richard's/Burdines building was torn down for J. Luria and Sons, a local catalog showroom chain, which opened at the mall in 1994. The Luria's building later became Garden Ridge Pottery, while Dillard's took the former Mervyns which closed in 1997. Garden Ridge later closed and became smaller stores. Phar-Mor was torn down for a Kmart.

In 2002, management of the mall was assigned to T/S Development of Miami, Florida, which changed the name of the mall in November 2003 to Southland Mall. Also, the Dillard's store closed and was torn down in 2004 for Regal Cinemas in 2005, and this was also likewise done at Pompano Citi Centre where the Dillard's was also demolished. T/S Development then bought the property in November 2004, and sold their interests to Investcorp International Realty, a global investment group, in December 2006. Investcorp engaged Gumberg Asset Management Corp in Fort Lauderdale to handle the day-to-day management and leasing of Southland Mall.

Southland Mall features JCPenney and Macy's as its anchor stores. The mall also features a movie theater, LA Fitness, DSW Shoe Warehouse, Victoria's Secret, Old Navy, TJ Maxx, Buffalo Wild Wings, and Ulta. Additional businesses on the mall property include Ross Dress for Less, SunTrust, Olive Garden, Applebee's, Regions Bank, Churromania, and Baby Elegant.

In 2015, Sears Holdings spun off 235 of its properties, including the Sears at Southland Mall, into Seritage Growth Properties.

On July 7, 2017, it was announced that Kmart would be closing on October 1 as part of a plan to close 43 Kmart and Sears stores nationwide.

On November 7, 2019, it was announced that Sears would be closing this location a part of a plan to close 96 stores nationwide. The store closed on February 14, 2020.

In 2022, the private real estate equity firm Electra America and private real estate investment and development firm BH Group announced the $1.5 billion renovation of the Southland Mall. The former Sears and Kmart locations will have a residential complex in its current place, while the gazebo in the main entrance will be covered with a steel mesh with the name of the mall on it. The completion date as of March 29, 2025 is Q3 2027.

== Carousel ==
The mall features a full-sized Italian carousel. It was purposely built, featuring imagery of New York, and operated at the Rotterdam Square Mall in Rotterdam, New York from 1988 until it was sold in January 2007.
