= Knollys (surname) =

- Pronunciation: /noʊlz/
- Language: English

Origin
- Language: English
- Meaning: "at the knoll"

Other names
- Variant forms: Knolles, Knoll, Knowles, Knowle, Noll, Noel, Nowell

Knollys is an English surname and variants include Knolles, Knoll, Knowles, and Knowle.

== Surname ==
- Charles Knollys/Knowles (disambiguation)
- David Knollys, 3rd Viscount Knollys (1931–2023), British peer, lawyer and politician (Conservative Party)
- Edward Eardley Knollys (1902–91), British artist
- Elizabeth Knollys, Lady Leighton (1549–c.1605), English courtier under Elizabeth I
- Francis Knollys (disambiguation)
- Hanserd Knollys (1599–1691), English particular Baptist minister
- Henry Knollys (disambiguation)
- Lettice Knollys (1543–1634), British noblewoman
- Louis Frederic Knollys (1847–1902), British colonial police chief in Ceylon and Jamaica
- Richard Knollys (c.1548–96), English MP
- Robert Knollys (disambiguation)
- Sir Thomas Knollys (d.1435), English businessman
- William Knollys (disambiguation)

== See also ==
- Knollys family
- Knollys (disambiguation)
- Baron Knollys, subsidiary title to the Earl of Banbury created in the Peerage of England
- Viscount Knollys, title created in the Peerage of the United Kingdom
- Knollys baronets, two Baronetcies created in the Baronetage of Great Britain
- Knowles (disambiguation)
- Knowles (surname)
