= Knowles (surname) =

- Pronunciation: /noʊlz/
- Language: English

Origin
- Language: English
- Meaning: "At the knoll"

Other names
- Variant forms: Knollys, Knolles, Knoll, Knowle, Noll, Noel, Nowell

Knowles (/noʊlz/) is an English surname of mixed Anglo-Saxon and Norse origins. It is a locality name meaning 'at the knoll', a hill or summit, derived from Old English cnolle and Old Norse knollr 'hilltop' and thus describes a person who lived at such a place.

It can also be an Anglicized version of the Irish name Ó Tnúthghail.

== A ==
- Albert Knowles, British trade union leader
- Albert Knowles (footballer) (1871–1950), English footballer
- Alison Knowles (1933–2025), American artist
- Alison Knowles (rower) (born 1982), British rower
- Angus Knowles-Cutler (born 1962), British politician
- Anne Kelly Knowles (born 1957), American geographer
- Arlene Modeste Knowles, American advocate for diversity in physics

== B ==
- Bernard Knowles (1900–1975), English film director
- Beyoncé Knowles-Carter (born 1981), American R&B singer and actress
- Barry Knowles (born 1965), Liverpool Football Club supporter

== C ==
- Cameron Knowles (born 1982), New Zealand footballer
- Carl Knowles (1910–1981), American basketball player
- Admiral of the White Sir Charles Knowles, 1st Baronet (1704–1777) (see Knowles Baronets)
- Admiral of the Red Sir Charles Knowles, 2nd Baronet (1754–1831)
- Chris Knowles (footballer), English footballer
- Christopher Knowles (poet) (born 1959), American poet
- Christopher Knowles (comics), American comic book artist and writer
- Clayton Knowles, American correspondent
- Conrad Knowles (1810–1844), Australian actor
- Craig Knowles (born 1959), Australian politician
- Cyril Knowles (1944–1991), English football player
- Cyril Knowles (rugby league) (1915–1957), English rugby player, father of the above
- Cyril J. Knowles (1905–1961), British cinematographer

== D ==
- Darold Knowles (born 1941), baseball player
- David Knowles (1896–1974), English Benedictine monk
- Davy Knowles (born 1987), British blues guitarist and singer
- Dick Knowles (1917–2008), British politician
- Durward Knowles (1917–2018), Bahamian sailor

== E ==
- Edward Knowles (Royal Navy officer) (1744 – c. 1761), British naval officer
- Edward P. Knowles (1805–1881), American politician from Rhode Island
- Eric Knowles (born 1953), British antiques expert
- Eric Knowles (cricketer) (1896–1978), Australian cricketer

== F ==
- Frederick John Knowles (1895–1979), Scottish observer ace
- Freeman T. Knowles (1846–1910), American politician

== G ==
- Genny Kim Knowles (born 2000), Canadian and South Korean ice hockey player
- George Knowles (1882–1947), Australian public servant and lawyer
- George Beauchamp Knowles (1790–1862), English botanist
- Graeme Paul Knowles (born 1951), Dean of St. Paul's Cathedral, London
- Guy Knowles (1879–1959), engineer, art collector and benefactor of museum collections

== H ==
- Harriet Knowles (fl. 1845), Australian actress
- Harry Knowles (born 1971), online film critic
- Herbert Knowles (poet) (1798–1817), English poet
- Herbert Bain Knowles (1894–1975), United States Navy officer
- Hiram Knowles (1834–1911), American judge from Montana
- Horace G. Knowles (1863–1937), American attorney
- Horace J Knowles (1884–1954), author and illustrator
- Hugh S. Knowles (1904–1988), American acoustical engineer, inventor, and manufacturer

== J ==
- Jacob Knowles, American lobsterman and social media content creator
- James Knowles (lexicographer) (1759–1840), Irish schoolteacher and lexicographer, father of James Sheridan Knowles
- James Knowles, convicted of murdering Michael Donald in 1981
- James Hinton Knowles (1856–1943), British Missionary to Kashmir
- James Thomas Knowles (1831–1908) (1831–1908), British architect and literary editor
- James Sheridan Knowles (1784–1862), Irish dramatist and actor
- James Thomas Knowles (1806–1884), British architect
- James Knowles (aviator) (1896–1971), American World War I pilot
- Jason Knowles, American investigative journalist
- Jeremy R. Knowles (1935–2008), American chemist
- Jeremy Knowles (swimmer) (born 1981), Bahamian swimmer
- Jesse Knowles (1919–2006), American businessman and politician
- Jo-Anne Knowles (born 1971), English actress
- John Evans Knowles (1914–2011), Canadian politician
- John Knowles (1926–2001), American author
- Julian Knowles (composer) (born 1965), Australian composer

== K ==
- Karen Knowles (born 1964), Australian singer and entertainer
- Kevin Knowles (born 2003), American football player

== L ==
- Sir Lees Knowles, 1st Baronet (1857–1928), British barrister, historian, philanthropist and Conservative politician
- Sir Leonard Joseph Knowles (1915–1999), first Chief Justice of The Bahamas
- Linda Knowles (born 1946), former British high jumper

== M ==
- Mabel Knowles (1875–1949), British romance and children's writer
- Malcolm Knowles (1913–1997), American theorist in adult education
- Malik Knowles (born 2000), American football player
- Mark Knowles (born 1971), professional Bahamian tennis player
- Mark Knowles (born 1984), Australian field hockey player
- Martin Knowles, English dubstep musician known as Emalkay
- Mary Ann Knowles (1946–2017), American politician
- Mary Morris Knowles (1733–1807), was an English Quaker poet and abolitionist
- Mathew Knowles (born 1951), father of Beyoncé and Solange Knowles
- Matilda Cullen Knowles (1864–1933), lichenologist
- Matt Knowles (born 1974), American professional wrestler
- Michael Knowles:
  - Michael Knowles (actor), English actor and scriptwriter, best known for his role as 'Captain Jonathan Ashwood', in the 1970s sitcom 'It Ain't Half Hot Mum'
  - Michael Knowles (political commentator) (born 1990), conservative political commentator on The Daily Wire
  - Michael Knowles (politician) (born 1942), British Conservative Member of Parliament for Nottingham East

== N ==
- Nick Knowles (born 1962), British television presenter

== O ==
- Oliver Knowles, instrumentalist for the music group Snow Ghosts

== P ==
- Patric Knowles (1911–1995), English actor
- Paul John Knowles (1946–1974), American serial killer
- Peter Knowles (born 1945), former English footballer

== R ==
- Ralph Knowles (1945–2016), American attorney
- Ralph Lewis Knowles (1928–2024), American solar access design expert
- Richard Brinsley Knowles (1820–1882), British journalist
- Richard George Knowles (1858–1919), Canadian-American comedian and singer, popular in British music halls
- Robert E. Knowles (1925–1988), American politician
- Ryan Knowles (born 1978), American actor and comedian

== S ==
- Sheena Knowles, Australian children's author
- Solange Knowles (born 1986), pop/soul singer, actress, model (Beyoncé Knowles' younger sister)
- Sonny Knowles (1932–2018), Irish singer
- Stanley Knowles (1908–1997), Canadian politician
- Stan Knowles (1931–2017), Australian politician
- Sydney Knowles, British frogman in World War II
- Sue Knowles (born 1951), retired Australian politician

== T ==
- Tina Knowles, American businesswoman, fashion designer, and mother of Beyoncé and Solange
- Tony Knowles (chemist), former president of the British Columbia Institute of Technology
- Tony Knowles (politician) (born 1943), American Democratic politician
- Tony Knowles (snooker player) (born 1955), English professional snooker player

== V ==
- Valentino Knowles (born 1988), Bahamian boxer
- Vernon Knowles (1899–1968), Australian writer
- Vernon Charles Knowles (1897–1985), Canadian politician
- Victoria Knowles (born 1976), English author and actress

== W ==
- Warren P. Knowles (1903–1993), American lawyer and politician
- William Charles Goddard Knowles (1908–1969), British businessman in Hong Kong
- William David Knowles (1908–2000), Canadian politician
- William Erskine Knowles (1872–1951), Canadian politician
- William Standish Knowles (1917–2012), American chemist

== See also ==
- Knowles Baronets, two Baronetcies created in the Baronetage of Great Britain and the United Kingdom
- Knollys (surname)
- Knollys family
- Knowle (disambiguation), includes list of people with surname Knowle
- Knoll (surname)
- Noll, surname
- Noel (surname)
- Nowell (surname)
