= Francis Knollys =

Francis Knollys or Knowles may refer to:

- Sir Francis Knollys (the elder) (1514–1596), Treasurer of the Royal Household to Queen Elizabeth I of England
- Sir Francis Knollys (admiral) (died 1648), son of above, admiral, MP for Oxford (1575–1589), Berkshire (1604–1611, 1625) and Reading (1640–1648)
- Francis Knollys (MP, died 1643) (c. 1592–1643), son of above, MP for Reading (1624–1629, 1640–1643)
- Francis Knollys (MP, died 1754) (c. 1697–1754), British politician, MP for Oxford (1722–1734)
- Sir Francis Knollys, 1st Baronet of Thame (c. 1722–1772), MP for Reading (1761–1768)
- Sir Francis Charles Knowles, 3rd Baronet (1802–1892), see Knowles baronets
- Francis Knollys, 1st Viscount Knollys (1837–1924), private secretary to Edward VII of England
- Sir Francis Knowles, 5th Baronet (1886–1953), anthropologist
- Francis Gerald William Knowles, 6th baronet (1915–1974), biologist

== See also ==
- Sir Charles Francis Knowles, 7th Baronet (born 1951), see Knowles baronets
- Frank Knowles (1891–1951), English footballer
- Knollys (disambiguation)
- Knowles (disambiguation)
