= Nicholas Knowles, 3rd Earl of Banbury =

Earldom of Banbury
- Azure, crusilly of 12 cross-crossletts, a cross moline, voided or.
- Creation date: 1626
- Peerage: Peerage of England
- First holder: William Knollys
- Last holder: William Knollys, titular 8th Earl of Banbury
- Remainder to: Heirs male of the first earl's body lawfully begotten
- Subsidiary titles: Viscount Wallingford; Baron Knollys
- Seats: Boughton Hall, Harrowden Hall.
- Motto: In utrumque paratus

Nicholas Knowles, Knollis or Knollys, 3rd Earl of Banbury, (3 January 1631 - 14 March 1674) was an English nobleman who sat in the House of Lords but was excluded from the Long Parliament, thus precipitating the famous “Banbury Case” which remains partly unresolved to this day.

The Banbury case was notorious both for its long duration and for the fact that it involved the bastardisation of children without an accompanying Parliamentary divorce. William Knollys, 1st Earl of Banbury, had died apparently childless, aged 85, in 1632. His widow, the Catholic Lady Elizabeth Howard, over thirty years his junior, had quickly married Edward Vaux, 4th Baron Vaux of Harrowden, also a Catholic, and soon after produced two young children who had undoubtedly been born during her first husband's lifetime and who, she claimed, were William's lawful issue. The case fell into abeyance during the English Civil War and the Commonwealth of England, but when Lady Elizabeth's son Nicholas attempted to take his seat in the Convention Parliament (1660) leading up to The Restoration, his legitimacy was successfully challenged by his peers. There followed the presentation and scrutiny of at least eight petitions by Nicholas and his descendants, before their claim of his legitimacy was finally defeated in 1813, although the Committee merely reported that the petitioner had not discharged the burden of proof that lay upon him and so left the way open for a future claim.

== Family and early life ==
Nicholas was born on 3 January 1631, a second son to The Countess of Banbury, at Harrowden Hall in Northamptonshire, the house of Edward Vaux, 4th Baron Vaux of Harrowden. She was the daughter of Thomas Howard, 1st Earl of Suffolk and granddaughter of Thomas Howard, 4th Duke of Norfolk, a second cousin of Queen Elizabeth I.

Her husband was, William Knollys, 1st Earl of Banbury, whose mother, Catherine Carey was a first cousin of Queen Elizabeth I. Some historians believe that Catherine was the illegitimate child of Henry VIII, which would make her also Elizabeth I's paternal half-sister She was also the mother of Lettice Knollys, (married to Robert Dudley, Earl of Leicester, favourite of Elizabeth I) and grandmother of Robert Devereux, Earl of Essex, the last favourite of Elizabeth I.

The Earl of Banbury died the following year on 25 May 1632 when he was about eighty-five or eighty-six years of age. According to a physician, Robert Lloyd, who was present at his death, he died at the house of Dr. Grant, in Paternoster Row in London, whom he had consulted during his last illness Less than five weeks later the widowed countess married Edward Vaux, 4th Baron Vaux of Harrowden, then aged forty-four

It was known that in 1605 Lord Vaux had been on the point of marrying Lady Elizabeth Howard, shortly before she married William Knollys. Indeed, if Vaux's mother can be believed, it was only the Gunpowder Plot that prevented his journey to London to become formally engaged to her; if that be so, she suffered a very sudden change of heart. And in March 1630 Vaux was still visiting her, if no more.

By 1641 the countess herself appears to have been regarded by parliament as a dangerous recusant. In June 1641 The Countess of Banbury and Nicholas obtained a licence to travel abroad and to take with them twelve servants, £200 in money, and such carriages as she needed. On 20 January 1642 the House of Commons ordered four justices of the peace to search the house in Northamptonshire of Lord Vaux who was then abroad, "and such other suspected places, for recusancy, as they shall think fit, in that county, for arms.’ In June 1642, the countess again obtained leave to go abroad, apparently to France, and to take with her six coach-horses and three nags. In 1643 she obtained the Speaker's warrant to go to France once more with twelve servants and her necessary apparel, and that she should have

"a coach and six horses and ten saddle horses to pass to the sea-side, and to return to carry her Ladyship and her servants to the port where she embarks”.

== Assumption of the Earldom ==
Nicholas was known to have travelled to France with his mother in 1644 and may well have been in the party that included his elder brother Edward, the 2nd earl that was robbed in Italy, for John Evelyn notes an entry in his diary for 28 January 1645;

"We dined at Sermoneta, descending all this morning down a stony mountain, unpleasant, yet full of olive trees; and, anon, pass a tower built on a rock, kept by a small guard against the bandetti who infest these parts, daily robbing and killing passengers, as my lord Banbury and his company found to their cost a little before."

His elder brother, the 2nd earl was however killed returning to England in a quarrel on the road between Calais and Gravelines in or before June 1645, and Nicholas, then aged about fifteen, immediately assumed the title of Earl of Banbury, and he was so described in a deed dated 19 October 1646 by which his step-father, Lord Vaux, settled the manor of Harrowden and other property in Northamptonshire, on the countess for life, with remainder to her son Nicholas: the relevant passage is,

“The Right honourable Nicholas now Earl of Banbury son of the said Countess of Banbury heretofore called Nicholas Vaux, or by whichsoever of the said names or descriptions or any other name or description the said Nicholas be or hath been called reputed or known.”

That description is of interest, because the fact that Nicholas was known as Nicholas Vaux seemed to confirm the suspicion that he was not the son of the Earl of Banbury. On the other hand, it could be said that the proceedings in Chancery in February 1641 and the inquisition the following April had established the legitimacy of the children of the countess, a contention that was supported by the fact that during the period of almost twenty years that had elapsed since the adverse finding of the inquisition of 1633, her sons had successively borne the title of Earl of Banbury without any question being raised.

The Countess of Banbury died on 17 April 1658, aged seventy-three, and was buried at Dorking in Surrey. Lord Vaux died on 8 April 1661 without issue.

== The Convention Parliament (1660) ==
The title assumed by Nicholas was questioned for the first time in the Convention Parliament of 1660. Since Charles II had not then been restored to the throne, writs of summons to the parliament could not be issued by the crown. Nine peers met, however, and appointed the Edward Montagu, 2nd Earl of Manchester to be Speaker of the House pro tempore, and then nominated a committee to determine which lords should receive letters requesting their attendance. The committee reported the names of those peers to whom letters should be sent, and a draft of the letter from Lord Manchester, as Speaker, was entered in the journals of the House. It is not clear whether Nicholas received a letter from Lord Manchester, but it is certain that he took his seat in the House on or before 4 June 1660 and was present on 15 June.

The Convention Parliament (1660) had assembled on 25 April 1660 but Nicholas's right to sit in the Lords was not questioned until some twelve weeks later. On13 July the House resolved "that there being a person that now sits in this House as a Peer, viz. the Earl of Banbury, it is ordered that this business shall be heard at the bar by counsel on Monday come se’ennight [23 July]".

On that day he was present in the House and was appointed a member of a committee on a private bill, but no proceedings relating to his peerage took place. He was present on the three following days, and he was again appointed to a committee; he was in his place on twelve days in July and attended the House frequently until the session ended on 13 September; when the next session began on 6 November he was again in regular attendance until the 21st of that month when he obtained leave to be absent from the House. The Convention Parliament (1660) was dissolved on 29 December without having investigated the earl's title, but the leave of absence granted to him appears to be a tacit admission that he had a right to be present.

== The Cavalier Parliament ==
The next parliament, which came to be known as the Cavalier Parliament, was summoned on 18 February 1661 and assembled on 8 May, but no writ was issued to the Earl of Banbury. Nicholas therefore presented a petition to the king, Charles II of England in which he styled himself Earl of Banbury. The petition, after reciting the various titles bestowed on the late earl, the marriage of the late earl to Elizabeth Howard and the birth of her children, stated that Nicholas had sat in the last parliament as Earl of Banbury and had exercised all the privileges accorded to other earls there. The petition concluded with a prayer that a writ of summons might issue to him as Earl of Banbury, and that he might

"enjoy all the precedency and privilege thereunto belonging granted by the letters patent of that dignity.”

The inclusion in the petition of a claim to the precedence granted to the late earl was, as matters turned out, a serious error of judgment. In 1628 the House of Lords had grudgingly acceded to the king's request for precedence for the newly created earl, but had insisted that it should be accorded only during his life and should not go to his heirs. That a claim to that precedence should now be made by a man claiming to be the heir of the first Earl of Banbury naturally excited the antagonism of every earl whose patent of creation was dated between 5 February and 18 August 1626, namely the earls of Berkshire, Cleveland, Monmouth, Danby, Manchester, Mulgrave, Marlborough and Totnes, and holders of all those earldoms save Danby and Totnes were living in 1661. Presumably what excited the hostility of a large body of peers towards Nicholas was his insistence on being granted the precedence accorded to the first earl, to which the House had agreed on the express condition that it should be for the life of the first earl only

The petition was referred by the king to the House of Lords where it was read on 6 June 1661 and referred to the Committee for Privileges. The Committee met on 10 June and on various days thereafter, and heard counsel and witnesses on behalf of Nicholas, and the submissions of the attorney general. The law as it then stood was enshrined in the maxim Pater est quem nuptiae demonstrant, that is, if a child be born in lawful wedlock the law would presume that his father was the husband of his mother. On that basis, Nicholas was the legitimate son of the first Earl of Banbury, and the Committee resolved to report to the House "the matter of fact that "according to the law of the land he is legitimate". Probably because it was thought that that phraseology drew a distinction between "legitimacy in law" and "legitimacy in fact", as if there were two kinds of legitimacy, the report was altered before it was presented to the House, and on 1 July 1661 the Committee reported their conclusion to be That Nicholas Earl of Banbury is a legitimate person.

The House of Lords refused to adopt the report and proceeded, on 9 and 10 July, itself to investigate the matter. Counsel were heard for and against the claim, and "after long debate " the House once more referred the matter to the Committee for Privileges which was ordered to meet on 15 July. After meeting again the Committee reached the opinion that "the Earl of Banbury is, in the eye of the Law, son of the late William Earl of Banbury", and therefore they thought that the king should be advised by the House to issue a writ of summons to him; as to the point of precedence, the committee was of opinion that he should have precedence from the date of his patent.

That report of the committee was presented to the House by the Earl of Northampton on 19 July, and it was ordered to be taken into consideration on the following Monday. The matter was not then considered but on 28 November the House resolved to postpone debate on the report until 9 December. On that day a bill "declaring Nicholas, called Earl of Banbury to be illegitimate was read a first time but, presumably because of the injustice of such a course, the bill was abandoned

Thus the matter rested for some years, but under the date 26 October 1669 the following entry appears in the journals of the House of Lords:

"Upon the calling of the House of Peers this day, the House taking notice that the Earl of Banburie's name is not in the list by which the Lords are called: it is ordered that it be referred to the Committee for Privileges, to examine why the said Earl of Banburye's name is left out of the said list, he having formerly sat as a Peer in this House; and to peruse all former proceedings in this House concerning him, and to make report thereof unto the House."

The report of the committee was made to the House on 25 November 1669 by Arthur Capell, 1st Earl of Essex; after reciting the previous proceedings in the House concerning the Earl and the evidence given by Garter King of Arms, it concluded by stating that "they leave the business to the consideration of the House."

Following that unsatisfactory outcome, Nicholas presented a petition on 23 February 1670 to the House of Lords in which he stated "that he had the honour to be a Peer of this Realm by descent, and is legally entitled by right of inheritance to the dignity and honour of Earl of Banbury", and he prayed that he might receive his writ of summons.

After the petition had been read, the House ordered that it be referred to the Committee for Privileges, but no further proceedings had taken place when Nicholas died less than four years afterwards; he died on 14 March 1674 and was buried at Boughton in Northamptonshire. The parish register recorded the event as follows:

"The Right honourable Nicholas Earl of Banbury departed this life March the 14th, about eleven or twelve o'clock in the night, 1673-4.[23]”

== Family & Issue ==
Nicholas was married twice, firstly to Lady Isabella Blount ( - 1654) dau of Mountjoy Blount, 1st Earl of Newport, (his first cousin) and had

- Anne - baptised 1 May 1653 daughter of Nicholas & Isabella - St Martins in ye fields. m. 1st 18 August 1667 Christopher Fry. 1 s. Mountjoy, 2nd Sir John Briscoe (d. 8 Feb 1724) and had issue 2 dau & Diana m. Rt Rev Dr Welbore Ellis (bishop) Lord Bishop of Meath and issue Welbore Ellis, 1st Baron Mendip. Anne mother of Charles Agar, 1st Earl of Normanton
- Mary - b. 12 Feb 1654, baptised 14th Feb 1654 as Mary Knowles at St James Piccadilly and buried 16th Feb 1654, whose mother Isabella Knowles, Comitissa de Banbury Sepultam Ecclesia, died and was buried 2 March 1654 at St James Piccadilly (died without male issue)

He married secondly Anne Sherard (b. - d. 6 March 1679/80) on 4 October 1655, dau of William Sherard, 1st Baron Sherard of Leitrim and had

- Anna Maria - b between 1655 and 1668 m. 1st Major Walter Littleton killed in a dual 19 December 1688 (2nd son of Sir Edward Littleton, 2nd Baronet of Pillaton Hall) by whom she had a daughter, Anne who died unmarried aged 18, 2nd Capt Philip Lawson killed in a dual 6 oct 1692 (sixth son of Sir John Lawson Bt of Brough in Yorkshire), 3rd Col (Robert? Harvey of Leicestershire.
- Charles 4th Earl of Banbury. 3 June 1662 - 26 Aug 1740
- Abigail d 1668
- Katherine (1669 - 1747) m. Monsieur George Seigneur, and subsequently met the man who was to become the love of her life, John Law (economist) of Lauriston. They had a daughter Mary Katherine who married her first cousin William Knollys (MP for Banbury) Viscount Wallingford, the son of Charles 4th Earl of Banbury.
- Althra buried June 7, 1671 Boughton.

Nicholas's son and heir, Charles, 4th Earl of Banbury soon after attaining his majority, petitioned the House of Lords for a writ of summons, but he had no more success than his father. So matters stood for some years until the claim was again made in unusual circumstances.

Charles killed his brother-in-law, Captain Philip Lawson, in a duel and was indicted for murder on 7 December 1692; the indictment charged him in the name of Charles Knowles, esq. Charles thereupon presented a petition to the House of Lords praying that, as Earl of Banbury, he might be tried by his peers. After counsel had been heard, it was proposed that the judges be consulted on the points of law in the case; that motion was rejected, but immediately afterwards the House resolved that Charles had no right to the Earldom of Banbury and his petition was dismissed. His case was transferred to the Court of King's Bench where, in the spring of 1693 he was granted bail, and in the summer of 1694 John Holt (Lord Chief Justice) quashed the indictment against Charles Knowles esq, and Knowles walked free. His indictment as Charles earl of Banbury still subsisted, and he remained on bail on the charge of manslaughter until the day of his death 46 years later. Charles petitioned for his writ on three further occasions without success and no more was done in the matter for many years.

By 1806 there had not been an earl of Banbury for 180 years when General Sir William Knollys. K.C.B. known as the earl of Banbury renewed the claim and petitioned the crown for his writ of summons. The petition was referred to the attorney-general who made his report in January 1808. The House of Lords then referred the claim to the Committee for Privileges which, after considering the matter for five years, eventually reported to the House "that the Petitioner hath not made out his claim to the Title, Dignity and Honour of Earl of Banbury." When the House considered the committee's report it came to a conclusion that differed materially from the report; on 15 March 1813 it resolved "that the Petitioner is not entitled to the Title, Honour and Dignity of Earl of Banbury." Whereas the Committee merely reported that the petitioner had not discharged the burden of proof that lay upon him and so left the way open for a future claim, the House proceeded to a judgment on the claim and rejected it. Since then no further claim to the earldom has been made

== Viscount Knollys ==
The claimant, General Sir William Knollys’ eldest son, Sir William Thomas Knollys” (1797–1883), styled Viscount Wallingford until 1813, entered the army and served with the Guards during the Peninsular War. From 1862 to 1877 he was comptroller of the household of the Prince of Wales, afterwards King Edward VII. From 1877 until his death on 23 June 1883, he was Gentleman Usher of the Black Rod; he was also a privy councillor and colonel of the Scots Guards. Of his children, one son Francis Knollys, 1st Viscount Knollys (b. 1837), was private secretary to Edward VII and George V (created Baron Knollys in 1902 and Viscount Knollys in 1911); another son, Sir Henry Knollys (1840–1930), became private secretary to King Edward's daughter Maud, Queen of Norway; and daughter, Charlotte, became the Private Secretary and close friend to the Princess of Wales, later Queen Alexandra and died unmarried in 1930.

== See also ==
- Knollys family
- Knowles Baronets
- Sir Charles Knowles, 1st Baronet
- Earl of Banbury
- Knollys Rose Ceremony
