= Charles Knowles =

Charles Knowles is the name of:

- Sir Charles Knowles, 1st Baronet (1704–1777), Royal Navy admiral
- Sir Charles Knowles, 2nd Baronet (1754–1831), Royal Navy admiral
- Sir Charles Knowles, 4th Baronet (1832–1917), Royal Navy admiral
- Charles Knowles (British Army officer) (1835–1924), British general

== See also ==
- Knollys family
- Baron Knollys, subsidiary title to the Earl of Banbury created in the Peerage of England
- Viscount Knollys, title created in the Peerage of the United Kingdom
- Knollys baronets, two Baronetcies created in the Baronetage of Great Britain
- Knowles (disambiguation)
