= Knowles baronets of Lovell Hill (1765) =

Arms of Knowles baronets, of Lovell Hill: Azure a naval crown between four cross-crosslets in cross, all within a cross recercelée disjoined between as many crosses, all or. The naval crown, to honour the admirals, was adopted at some point after the third baronet.

The Knowles baronetcy, of Lovell Hill in the County of Berkshire, was created in the Baronetage of Great Britain on 31 October 1765 for Charles Knowles, Admiral of the White, Rear-Admiral of Great Britain, Governor of Jamaica and Member of Parliament for Gatton.

The 1st Baronet was thought to be the illegitimate son of Charles Knowles or Knollys, titular fourth Earl of Banbury, and therefore a half-brother of William Knollys (1694–1740). The 2nd Baronet was an admiral in the Royal Navy and created GCB. The 3rd Baronet was a mathematician and Fellow of the Royal Society. The 4th Baronet was a vice-admiral in the Royal Navy. The 5th Baronet was a prehistorian of note. The 6th Baronet was a Fellow of the Royal Society, Professor of Comparative Endocrinology at the University of Birmingham and Professor of Anatomy at King's College London. The 7th Baronet is a chartered architect whose London practice was established in 1984 as Charles Knowles Design, Architects.

== Knowles baronets, of Lovell Hill (1765) ==
Lovell Hill (Lovelhill) was the family residence at Cranbourne in Berkshire.

- Sir Charles Knowles, 1st Baronet (1704–1777)
- Sir Charles Henry Knowles, 2nd Baronet (1754–1831)
- Sir Francis Charles Knowles, 3rd Baronet (1802–1892), barrister and director of the Brompton Cemetery
- Sir Charles George Frederick Knowles, 4th Baronet (1832–1917)
- Sir Francis Howe Seymour Knowles, 5th Baronet (1886–1953)
- Sir Francis Gerald William Knowles, 6th Baronet (1915–1974)
- Sir Charles Francis Knowles, 7th Baronet (born 1951)
  - (Charles) William Frederick Lance Knowles (born 1985), heir apparent

Earlier arms of Knowles baronets: Per pale, azure and gules, crusilly of nine cross-crosslets, a cross moline, voided or

== Notes ==
Baronetage of Great Britain
Preceded by Mawbey baronets	Knowles baronets of Lovell Hill; 31 October 1765	Succeeded by Cornish baronets
