= Knollys =

Knollys may refer to:

== People ==
- Knollys (surname)
- Knollys family

== Titles ==
- Knollys baronets, two Baronetcies created in the Baronetage of Great Britain
- Baron Knollys, a subsidiary title to the Earl of Banbury created in the Peerage of England
- Viscount Knollys, a title created in the Peerage of the United Kingdom

== Other uses ==
- Knollys Rose Ceremony, annual event performed by the Company of Watermen and Lightermen of the River Thames.

== See also ==
- Knowles (disambiguation)
- Knowles (surname)
