= Henry Knollys =

Henry Knollys may refer to:

- Sir Henry Knollys (privateer) (c. 1542–1582), English privateer, courtier and MP for Reading and Oxfordshire
- Henry Knollys (Portsmouth MP), MP for Portsmouth in 1547
- Henry Knollys (politician, died 1583), MP for Grampound, New Shoreham, Guildford and Christchurch
- Sir Henry Knollys, 1st Baronet (c. 1611–1648), of the Knollys baronets
- Henry Knollys (St Ives MP) (1689–1747), MP for St Ives 1722–24
- Sir Henry Knollys (British Army officer) (1840–1930), British Army officer and courtier
