= Charlotte Knollys =

English courtier (1835–1930)

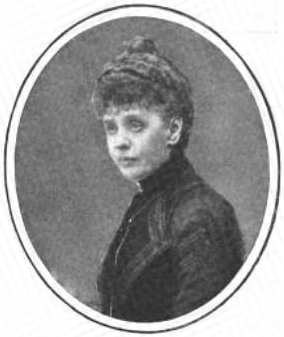
- In The Sketch, 8 January 1902
- Born: Elizabeth Charlotte Knollys; 5 January 1835; London, England
- Died: 24 April 1930 (aged 95); London, England
- Burial place: Highgate Cemetery
- Occupation: Courtier
- Parents: William Thomas Knollys (father); Elizabeth St. Aubyn (mother)

Hon. Elizabeth Charlotte Knollys (5 January 1835 – 24 April 1930) was an English courtier and member of the Knollys family. She was Lady of the Bedchamber, and the first woman private secretary, to Princess Alexandra of Denmark, later Queen Alexandra of the United Kingdom, consort of Edward VII.

== Biography ==
The daughter of Sir William Thomas Knollys, a successful military figure and Comptroller of the Household to Edward VII, when he was the Prince of Wales, and his wife, Elizabeth St. Aubyn, Charlotte Knollys was born in London on 5 January 1835. Her parents lived at 13 Portman St. in Marylebone. At 28, was sent into Alexandra's service as a Lady of the Bedchamber. The Princess of Wales came to rely heavily on her. By the late 1880s she began to perform duties as a private secretary. Alexandra required her services more when she was in mourning, for example when her son, Prince Albert Victor, Duke of Clarence and Avondale, died in 1892.

Upon Edward's ascension to the throne, when Queen Victoria died in 1901, Charlotte was officially installed at Alexandra's side as a Woman of the Bedchamber. The new king Edward VII granted her the style the Honourable and precedence as the daughter of a baron, after her brother became Viscount Knollys. She performed all duties as private secretary and was also in Alexandra's complete confidence. However, this came at the price of having little freedom, a price which grew much more oppressive when Edward died in 1910. Alexandra, now queen dowager, shut herself away in seclusion at Sandringham House, in Norfolk, England, her favourite home. Charlotte wrote in a letter dated a year before Alexandra's death in 1925:

H.M. is so fond of Sandringham...she readily falls in with the doctor's advice that she should not tire herself with all the hurry and bustle of the Season...As far as I'm concerned, I am a "Cockney born and bred", and down here I can never see my friends and relations and seem quite cut off from all the world.

— Letter to an unknown Gentleman; Private Manuscript collection

== Later years ==
Her leave of service came upon Alexandra's death in 1925. During her service, she was credited as the first woman private secretary to the Sovereign, and the first person not of royal blood to enter the Queen's boudoir without invitation. She was presented with a gold medal after saving Alexandra from a fire.

King Edward VIII remembered Charlotte Knollys in his memoirs:

""Miss Charlotte", as she was known in the family, was one of those undefiniable characters that earn the sobriquet "an institution". She was a diplomatic pillar of strength in a Royal Household that was not without its jealousies and intrigues. Miss Knollys was in continuous attendance, had never taken a holiday, and dealt in longhand with all my grandmother's personal correspondance."

== Death ==
She died, aged 95, unmarried, at her flat in South Audley Street, London in 1930. She was buried at Highgate Cemetery.

== See also ==
- Knollys (family)
