= Admiral Knowles =

Admiral Knowles may refer to:

- Sir Charles Knowles, 1st Baronet (c. 1704–1777), British Royal Navy admiral
- Sir Charles Knowles, 2nd Baronet (1754–1831), British Royal Navy admiral
- Sir Charles Knowles, 4th Baronet (1832–1917), British Royal Navy vice admiral
