= William Knollys =

William Knollys may refer to:

- William Knollys, 1st Earl of Banbury (1544–1632), English nobleman
- William Knollys (Oxfordshire MP, died 1664), MP for Oxfordshire, 1663–1664
- William Knollys (Banbury MP) (1694–1740), MP for Banbury, 1733–40, who claimed the courtesy title of Viscount Wallingford
- Sir William Knollys (British Army officer) (1797–1883), British general and courtier

== See also ==
- Knollys family
