= Gibbons baronets =

Set index for Gibbons baronets

There have been two baronetcies created for persons with the surname Gibbons, one in the Baronetage of Great Britain and one in the Baronetage of the United Kingdom. As of 2026, one creation is extant.

- Gibbons baronets of Stanwell Place (1752)
- Gibbons baronets of Sittingbourne (1872): see Sir Sills John Gibbons, 1st Baronet (1809–1876)
