= Robert Knowles =

Robert Knowles may refer to:

- Robert P. Knowles (1916–1985), American politician, member of the Wisconsin Senate
- Robert E. Knowles (1925–1988), American politician, member of the Florida House of Representatives.
- Robert Edward Knowles (1868–1946), Canadian writer and clergyman.
- Robert Knowles (parasitologist) (1883–1936), British parasitologist
- Rob Knowles (born 1947), Australian politician
- Captain Robert Knowles, a fictional character in Bernard Cornwell's Sharpe series
- Robert Knowles (entomologist), see Timeline of entomology since 1900

== See also ==
- Robert Knolles (c. 1325–1407), English knight of the Hundred Years' War
- Robert Knollys (disambiguation), same pronunciation
