= Mawbey baronets =

Escutcheon of the Mawbey baronets of Botleys

The Mawbey baronetcy, of Botleys in the County of Surrey, was a title in the Baronetage of Great Britain. It was created on 30 July 1765 for Joseph Mawbey, Member of Parliament for Southwark and Surrey. The title became extinct on the death of the 2nd Baronet in 1817.

== Mawbey baronets, of Botleys (1765) ==
- Sir Joseph Mawbey, 1st Baronet (1730–1798)
- Sir Joseph Mawbey, 2nd Baronet (c. 1770–1817), was married in 1796 to Charlotte Caroline Maria, daughter of Thomas Henchman of Littleton, but died without male issue. The estate of Botleys was sold shortly afterwards. His widow died in 1832.

Baronetage of Great Britain
Preceded by Major baronets	Mawbey baronets of Botleys; 30 July 1765	Succeeded by Knowles baronets
