= Sir Francis Knowles, 5th Baronet =

British archaeologist (1886–1953)

Sir Francis Howe Seymour Knowles, 5th Baronet (13 January 1886 – 4 April 1953) was an English anthropologist and the fifth of the Knowles baronets.

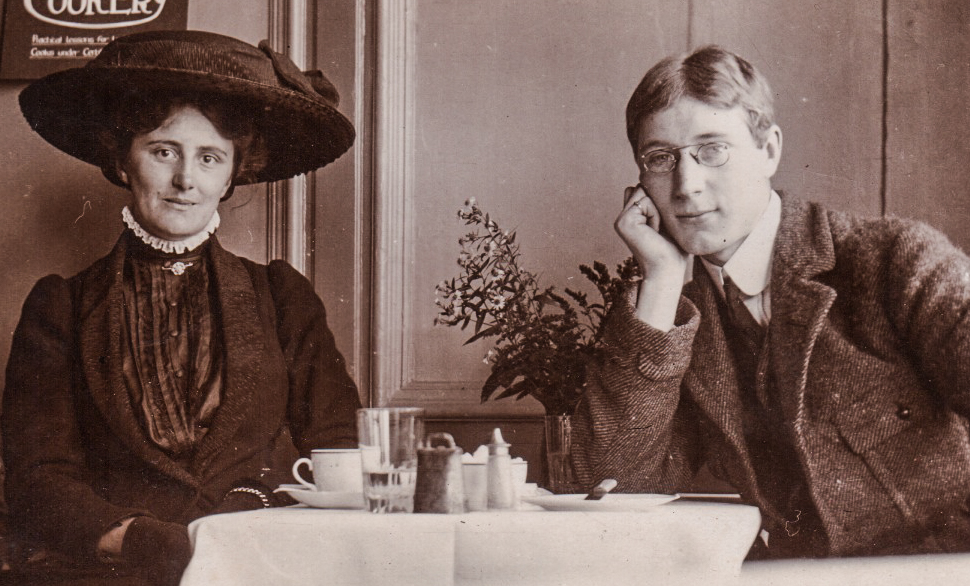
Lady Knowles with Sir Francis

Knowles read Law at Oriel College, Oxford, and turned to anthropology for his post-graduate work. In 1908 he was one of the first two students to be awarded the Diploma in Anthropology, taught at the Pitt Rivers Museum at Oxford University, to which he afterwards added the degree of B.Sc.

== Family and early life ==
This family is descended from Charles Knollys, titular 4th Earl of Banbury temp James 11. He was the fifth of his line since his great-great-grandfather, Sir Charles Knowles, admiral, was created a baronet for purely naval services in 1765. Of the first five holders of the title, three had been named Charles and became admirals. Knowles, like his grandfather, another Francis, pursued a scientific career, as would his own son Francis in turn becoming a Fellow of the Royal Society. His father Vice Admiral Sir Charles Knowles, 4th Baronet whilst stationed on the Newfoundland coast had met his mother, the Canadian Mary Ellen Thomson, the grand daughter of the Hon Joseph Howe, Lt Gov of Nova Scotia, and this may have influenced Knowles' decision to accept a post in Canada in 1912.

== Career ==
In 1909 he was appointed Assistant to the anatomist, Professor Arthur Thomson, specifically to carry out teaching and research in physical anthropology, the first post of its kind at Oxford University. During the next three years he catalogued and recorded two large collections of skulls: the Rolleston and the Williamson Collections. He collaborated with Sir Arthur Keith in reports on various skeletal remains, including a paper on Palaeolithic teeth from St. Brelade’s cave, Jersey. At the request of William Johnson Sollas he examined the bones of the so-called Red Lady of Paviland in 1913. From 1912 to 1919 he held the post of Physical Anthropologist for the Anthropological Division of the Geological Survey of Canada (now part of the Canadian Museum of Civilisation). In 1912 Knowles started fieldwork among the Iroquois of the Six Nations Reserve in southern Ontario and the Seneca (Iroquoian) people of the Tonawanda Reservation in western New York State. Supplementing his measurements of facial and physical characteristics, he also took an extensive series of photographic portraits. His portraits of the Iroquois are an unexpected and compassionate portrait of a people, transcending the scientific basis with which he began. A trained sculptor, he had the eye of an artist, as evidenced in his portrait composition and his mastery of the photographic craft. His field notes say little about his photographic interests, however, instead describing a passion for the sculpting of clay busts, an art studied in England. His monographs On the Glenoid Fossa in the skull of the Eskimo and The Physical Anthropology of the Roebuck Iroquois were published by the National Museum of Canada. Typhoid, contracted in Canada, forced him to give up his career as a physical anthropologist and he returned to England.

Knowles then settled in Oxford, and took up the study of the methods used by Stone Age peoples in making their tools and weapons. He studied the collections in the Pitt Rivers Museum, and developed skills in the manufacture of stone tools for experimental archaeology. He arranged a series of exhibition cases for the Pitt Rivers Museum, showing the techniques employed in stone-working from prehistory to the gun-flint-makers of Brandon, and illustrated with his own illustrations. His book The Stone-Worker’s Progress (1953) summarized this research, as did a number of papers, including ‘The Manufacture of a Flint Arrowhead by Quartzite Hammer-stone.’ Although by no means a wealthy man, his work at the Pitt Rivers Museum until his death was purely voluntary, due to continued periods of ill health stemming from his contracting typhoid. Having established a private collection of stone implements by 1904, he collected and donated many hundreds of stone tools, gunflints, stone tool technology and equipment as well as ethnographic objects including boomerangs to the museum over the years until his death. On the death of his son in 1974, most of the remainder of his collection were also given to the museum. In addition to his principal interests in stone tools, techniques and weaponry he contributed to museum documentation which appears to be so much better than others; “It has long been recognised that the quality of the ethnological records at the PRM are second to none, worldwide.....”Pole(evaluation) 2002. Not only did he donate artifacts, but also his time to the teaching of students until at least 1949.

The Curator, T. K. Penniman wrote a short account of Knowles' life for the introduction to Knowles' second Occasional Paper, published just after his death in 1953. In it he states: “...he was most generous in the gift of his time and knowledge, and of a character to develop in his pupils affection, respect and a desire for hard work. Both he and Lady Knowles always followed the work of the Museum, of whatever sort, with the greatest and most helpful interest, and knew all of the Staff to the youngest apprentice, and noted their progress with approval. ... All his work, both in the Museum, and in his publications, was based on exact observation and experiment. His work will endure, and his example will live in those he taught, and will be passed on...” [Knowles, 1953: 10]

== Family and issue ==
Knowles married Kathleen Constance Averina Lennon. He succeeded to the baronetcy on the death of his father in 1917 and died at Oxford on 4 April 1953 and is buried in Wolvercote Cemetery there. He was succeeded as baronet by his only son, Francis Gerald William Knowles.

== See also ==
- Knowles Baronets

Baronetage of Great Britain
Preceded by Charles Knowles	Baronet (of Lovell Hill); 1917–1953	Succeeded by Francis Knowles
