= Edward Knollys, 2nd Viscount Knollys =

British peer, public servant and businessman

The Right Honourable The Viscount Knollys GCMG MBE DFC
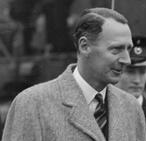
- Knollys, in 1943

Governor of Bermuda
- In office 1941–1943

Personal details
- Born: Edward George William Tyrwhitt Knollys; 16 January 1895
- Died: 3 December 1966 (aged 71) London, England
- Relations: Lord Berners (cousin); Vashon James Wheeler (cousin)
- Parent(s): Francis Knollys, 1st Viscount Knollys; Hon. Ardyn Mary Tyrwhitt
- Education: Harrow School
- Alma mater: New College, Oxford

Edward George William Tyrwhitt Knollys, 2nd Viscount Knollys, GCMG, MBE, DFC (16 January 1895 – 3 December 1966) was a British peer, public servant, and businessman. He was Governor of Bermuda from 1941 to 1943.

== Early life ==
The eldest son of Francis Knollys, 1st Viscount Knollys, Private Secretary to the Sovereign, and of Lady Knollys (formerly the Honourable Ardyn Mary Tyrwhitt, daughter of Sir Henry Tyrwhitt, 3rd Baronet and Harriet Tyrwhitt, 12th Baroness Berners).

Knollys was educated at Harrow School and New College, Oxford. He was a page of honour to King Edward VII from 1904 to 1910 and to King George V from 1910 to 1911, carrying the King's train at the latter's coronation in 1911.

== Career ==
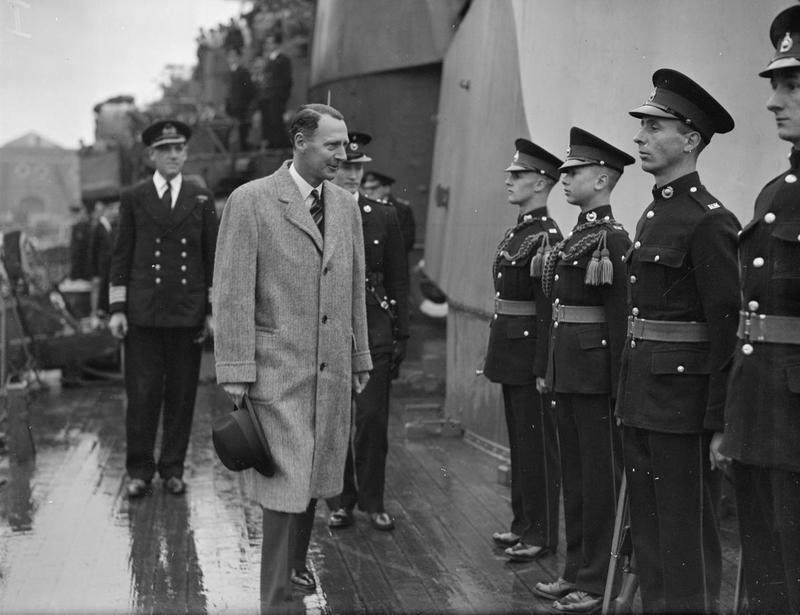
Knollys on board HMS Bermuda, 22 April 1943

He fought in the World War I, gaining the rank of Captain in the Queen's Westminsters of the Territorial Army (part of the British Army).

Upon the death of his father on 15 August 1924, he succeeded as the 2nd Viscount Knollys, of Caversham, and 2nd Baron Knollys, of Caversham. The Viscounts Knollys are members of the prominent Knollys family (pronounced "Nohlz") and are descended in the senior male line from William Knollys, 1st Earl of Banbury.

From 1941 to 1943, he served as the Governor and Commander-in-Chief of Bermuda, after which he served as chairman of the British Overseas Airways Corporation between 1943 and 1947. He was a director of Barclays Bank and was chairman of Vickers between 1956 and 1962, also serving as chairman of Employer's Liability Assurance Corporation in 1960.

=== Awards and honours ===
Lord Knollys was awarded the Croix de Guerre, the Distinguished Flying Cross, was appointed a Member of the Order of the British Empire and a Knight Commander of the Order of St Michael and St George in 1941 and Knight Grand Cross of the Order of St Michael and St George in 1952. He was awarded by the Netherlands with a Grand Officer in the Order of Orange-Nassau by Royal Decree no. 34 of 13 January 1947 ("in recognition of services to Netherlands interests during the war"). For this he retained British permission to accept and wear on 19 January 1948.

== Personal life ==
On 11 October 1928, he was married to Margaret Mary Josephine Coats, daughter of Sir Stuart Coats, 2nd Baronet and Jane Muir Greenlees. Her brother, James Coats, married Lady Amy Gordon-Lennox (eldest daughter of Charles Gordon-Lennox, 8th Duke of Richmond). Together they were the parents of:

- Hon. Ardyne Mary Knollys (b. 1929), who married Ronald James Owen, son of James Richard Owen, in 1958.
- David Francis Dudley Knollys, 3rd Viscount Knollys (1931–2023), who married Hon. Sheelin Virginia Maxwell, daughter of Lt.-Col. Hon. Somerset Arthur Maxwell (heir apparent to Arthur Maxwell, 11th Baron Farnham) and Angela Susan Roberts, in 1959.

Lord Knollys died at a nursing home in London on 3 December 1966. He was succeeded in his titles by his only son, David.
