= Henry Knollys (British Army officer) =

British Army officer and Private Secretary to Princess Maud of Wales (1840–1930)

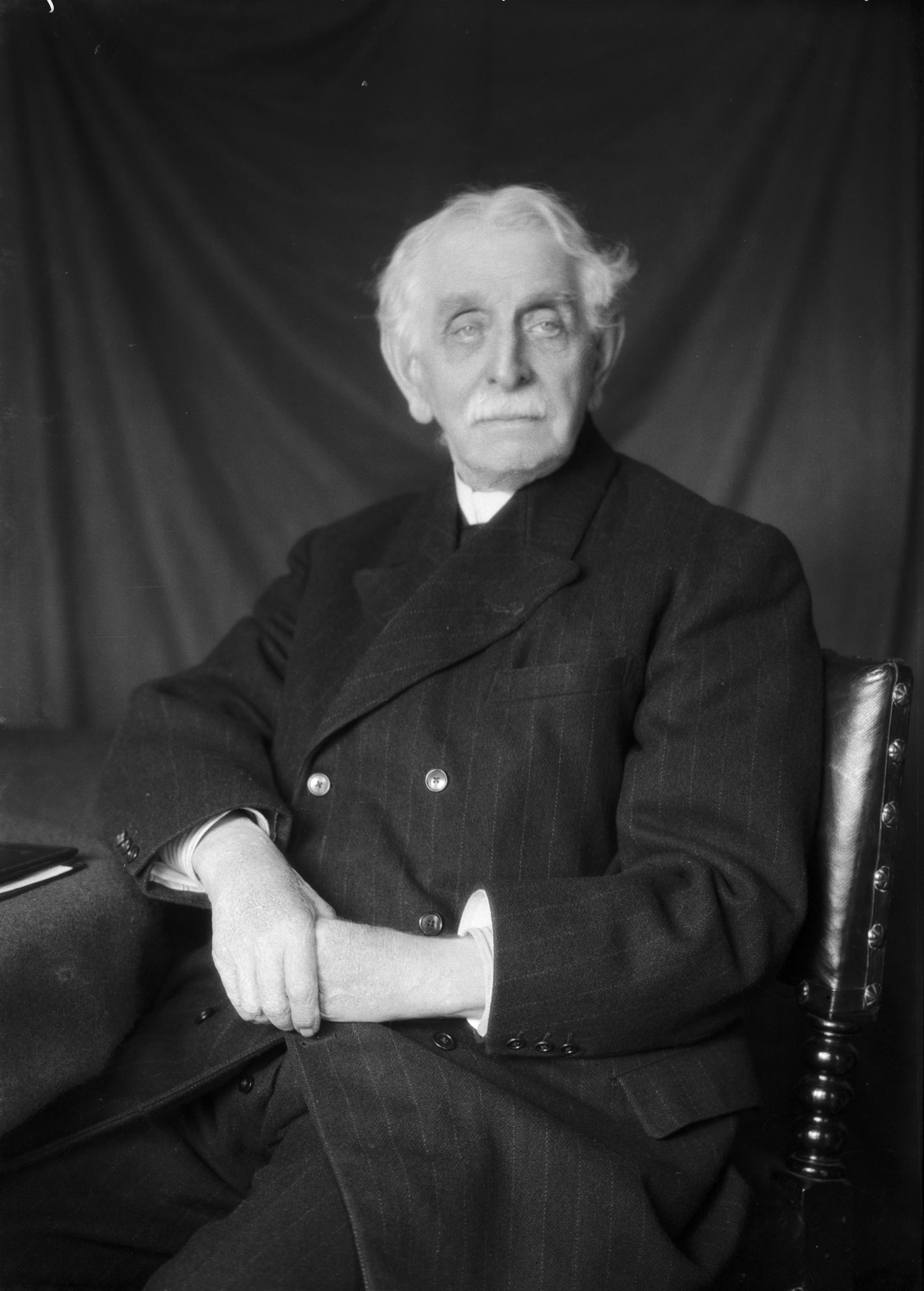
Knollys in 1927

Sir Henry Knollys KCVO (20 June 1840 – 1 March 1930) was an officer in the Royal Artillery, British Army, and from 1896 to 1919 a private secretary to Princess Maud of Wales (from 1905 Queen of Norway).

== Family ==
Knollys was the third and last surviving son of General The Right Hon. Sir William Thomas Knollys and grandson of General William Knollys, titular Earl of Banbury, who discontinued the use of the title in 1813, in consequence of a resolution in the House of Lords adverse to his claim. His elder brother Francis Knollys, 1st Viscount Knollys (1837–1924) was for many years Private Secretary successively to King Edward VII and to King George V; and his sister the Honourable Charlotte Knollys (1835–1930) was for years the devoted friend and servant of Queen Alexandra.

He married first, in 1876, Louisa Elizabeth Eyre (who died in 1888), daughter of Reverend E Eyre; and second, in 1909, Flora Goodeve, daughter of Louis Arthur Goodeve. There were no children of either marriage.

== Early life and military career ==
Henry Knollys was born on 20 June 1840. He was educated at Westminster School and joined the Royal Artillery from Woolwich, in 1860. He was on the staff of General Sir James Scarlett and of General Sir Hope Grant, and was subsequently Brigade Major, R.A., Aldershot, and Deputy Adjutant Quartermaster General., Northern District. From 1889 to 1891 he commanded the R.A. in South Africa.

== Courtier ==
In 1896 he was appointed Private Secretary and Comptroller in Britain to the Princess Maud of Wales on her marriage to Prince Charles of Denmark, and continued in that office when her Royal Highness became Queen of Norway upon her husband's election as such in November 1905. He retired in 1919. He was created a Member of the Royal Victorian Order (MVO) in August 1901, promoted to a Commander (CVO) in 1905, and knighted as a Knight Commander (KCVO) during the visit of the Norwegian royal couple to the UK in 1906. He also held the Danish Order of the Dannebrog and the Royal Norwegian Order of St. Olav.

== Author ==
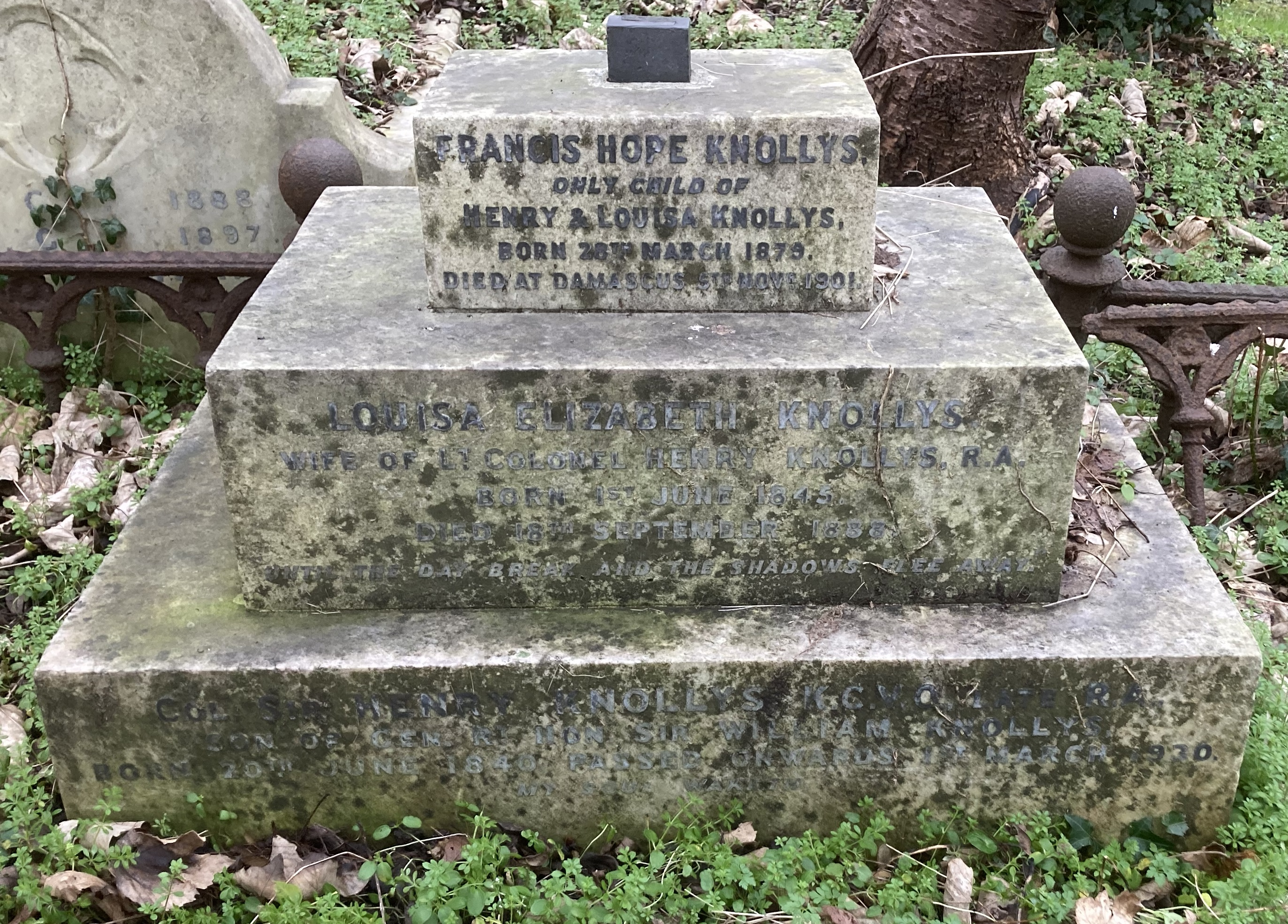
Family grave of Sir Henry Knollys in Highgate Cemetery

Sir Henry Knollys was the biographer of his old chief, Sir Hope Grant, with whom he wrote "Incidents in the Sepoy War" and "Incidents in the China War." He was also the author of "From Sedan to Saarbruck," "Sketches of Life in Japan," and "English Life in China." From time to time Sir Henry Knollys contributed interesting letters to The Times, notably one to the discussion on the circumstances of the French Prince Imperial's death. He related that he had seen the Prince's mount, a grey gelding about 15.3 hands high, then in the possession of Colonel Southey, who explained that the unusual height of the horse had prevented the Prince from mounting quickly enough.

Colonel Sir Henry Knollys, died at Bournemouth, Hampshire, on 1 March in his 90th year. The funeral service was held at Holy Trinity, Brompton, on Friday 7 March, and the interment was on the eastern side of Highgate Cemetery.
