= Sills John Gibbons =

Sir Sills John Gibbons, 1872 portrait

Sir Sills John Gibbons (1809–1876) was a London merchant and Lord Mayor of London in 1871.

== Life ==
He was born the son of Richard Gibbons of Chatham, Kent and became a hop merchant. He was a member of the Metropolitan Board of Works for the City of London (1868–71). He was elected an Alderman for Castle Baynard ward in 1862 and appointed a Sheriff of London for 1865–66 and 543rd Lord Mayor of London for 1871–72.

Escutcheon of the Gibbons baronets of Sittingbourne

Gibbons was created a baronet (of Sittingbourne) in 1872. He died bankrupt in Hastings in 1876 and was buried in Hastings cemetery. He had married Ann, the daughter of William Crookes; the baronetcy became extinct on his death.

Civic offices
Preceded by Sir Thomas Dakin	Lord Mayor of London; 1871–1872	Succeeded by Sir Sydney Waterlow, Bt
Baronetage of the United Kingdom
New creation	Baronet (of Sittingbourne); 1872–1876	Extinct
