= Arlene Modeste Knowles =

American advocate for diversity in physics

Arlene Modeste Knowles is an American advocate for diversity in physics. She is project manager for TEAM-UP Together (the Task Force to Elevate African American representation in Undergraduate Physics and Astronomy), a scholarship and diversity program of the American Institute of Physics (AIP) and American Physical Society (APS).

== Education and career ==
As a pre-med student at Cornell University, Knowles majored in human development. Rather than continuing a medical education, she began working for the American Physical Society, where she managed diversity-related programs including its Scholarship Program for Minority Undergraduate Physics Majors and its National Mentoring Community. Beyond race-related diversity issues, she has also been a strong advocate for programs within the APS to address LGBT+ issues and awareness. Outside of the AIP and APS, she has also worked with the American Association of Physics Teachers (AAPT), as 2020 chair of their Committee on Diversity in Physics, and with the American Association for the Advancement of Science, as a leader of their STEMM Equity Achievement Change Physics Project and in their astronomy awards program. In 2020, a task force led by Knowles called for US physics societies to create a $50M endowment for scholarships for students of color in physics and astronomy. She became the project manager for TEAM-UP Together in 2022, when the project was announced.

== Recognition ==
Knowles was elected as a Fellow of the American Physical Society in 2021, after a nomination from the APS Forum on Diversity and Inclusion, "for decades of advocacy, mentorship, and exemplary work to promote equity, diversity, and inclusion in physics, so that marginalized students can thrive". Sigma Pi Sigma, the physics and astronomy honor society, gave Knowles their 2022 Outstanding Service Award, "for a career of steadfast dedication to supporting student with an interest in physics and astronomy as they find their home, for her work on inclusion within the community, and a devotion to the Sigma Pi Sigma pillars of fellowship and service". She was named as a 2024 Fellow and a 2025 Black History Month Honoree of the National Society of Black Physicists, "for decades of visible and invisible advocacy, mentorship, and exemplary work around equity, diversity, and inclusion in physics learning spaces so that Black and other marginalized people, particularly students, can flourish and thrive".
