= Earl of Banbury =

Title in the Peerage of England

Earldom of Banbury
- Azure, crusilly of 12 cross-crossletts, a cross moline, voided or
- Creation date: 1626
- Peerage: Peerage of England
- First holder: William Knollys
- Last holder: William Knollys, titular 8th Earl of Banbury
- Remainder to: Heirs male of the first earl's body lawfully begotten
- Subsidiary titles: Viscount Wallingford; Baron Knollys

Earl of Banbury was a title in the Peerage of England. It was created in 1626 for William Knollys. He had already been created Baron Knollys in 1603 and Viscount Wallingford in 1616, both in the Peerage of England. However, the paternity of his sons was challenged, leading to hundreds of years of dispute.

In May 1804, King George III intended to confer the titles of Earl of Banbury, Viscount Wallingford and Baron Reading on the outgoing Prime Minister Henry Addington. However, Addington refused the honour and chose to remain in the Commons until 1805, when he joined Pitt's government as Lord President of the Council with the lesser title of Viscount Sidmouth.

== Peerage without right of summons ==
The first Earl of Banbury had two sons, Edward and Nicholas; however neither was mentioned in his will, prompting credible questions raised as to their paternity. In 1641, the law courts decided that Edward acceded to the Earldom. When Edward was killed in battle in June 1645, his brother Nicholas inherited the title. In the Convention Parliament of 1660, some objection was taken to the earl sitting in the House of Lords, and in 1661 he was not summoned to parliament; he had not succeeded in obtaining his writ of summons when he died on 14 March 1674.

Nicholas's son Charles, the 4th earl, had not been summoned to parliament when in 1692 he killed Captain Philip Lawson in a duel. The House of Lords declared that he was not a peer and therefore not entitled to have his case heard by them, but the Court of King's Bench released him from his imprisonment on the ground that he was the Earl of Banbury rather than a commoner. Nevertheless, the House of Lords refused to move from its position, and Knollys had not received a writ of summons when he died in April 1740. His son Sir Charles Knollys, vicar of Burford, Oxfordshire, and his grandsons, Sir William Knollys and Sir Thomas Woods Knollys, were successively titular Earls of Banbury, but they took no steps to prove their title.

Sir Thomas Woods Knollys' son General William Knollys, the titular eighth earl, laid claim to the title. He was forced to discontinue the use of the title in 1813, after the House of Lords passed a resolution rejecting his claim.

== Earls of Banbury ==
- William Knollys, 1st Earl of Banbury (1547–1632)
- Edward Knollys, 2nd Earl of Banbury (1627–1645)
- Nicholas Knowles, 3rd Earl of Banbury (1631–1674)
- Charles Knowles, 4th Earl of Banbury (1662–1740)
- Charles Knollys, titular 5th Earl of Banbury (1703–1771)
- William Knollys, titular 6th Earl of Banbury (1726–1776)
- Thomas Woods Knollys, titular 7th Earl of Banbury (1727–1793)
- William Knollys, titular 8th Earl of Banbury (1763-1834)

== Line of succession ==
- William Knollys, 1st Earl of Banbury (1547–1632)
  - Edward Knollys, 2nd Earl of Banbury (1627–1645)
  - Nicholas Knowles, 3rd Earl of Banbury (1631–1674)
    - Charles Knowles, 4th Earl of Banbury (1662–1740)
      - Sir Charles Knowles, 1st Baronet (c.1704–1777)
        - Knowles Baronets
      - Charles Knollys, titular 5th Earl of Banbury (1703–1771)
        - William Knollys, titular 6th Earl of Banbury (1726–1776)
        - Thomas Woods Knollys, titular 7th Earl of Banbury (1727–1793)
          - William Knollys, titular 8th Earl of Banbury (1763-1834)
            - Sir William Knollys (1797–1883)
              - William Knollys (1833–1904)
              - Francis Knollys, 1st Viscount Knollys (1837–1924)
                - Edward Knollys, 2nd Viscount Knollys (1895–1966)
                  - David Knollys, 3rd Viscount Knollys (1931–2023)
                    - Patrick Knollys, 4th Viscount Knollys (b. 1962)
                      - (1) Hon. Alexander Knollys (b. 2000)
                    - (2) Hon. Christopher Knollys (b. 1964)
                      - (3) Edmund Knollys (b. 2000)
                    - (4) Hon. Michael Knollys (b. 1968)

== See also ==
- Viscount Knollys
- Knollys Baronets
- Knowles Baronets
- Viscount Sidmouth
- William Knollys (1694–1740)
