= Sir Charles Knowles, 4th Baronet =

British Naval officer (1832–1918)

Vice-Admiral Sir Charles Knowles Bt
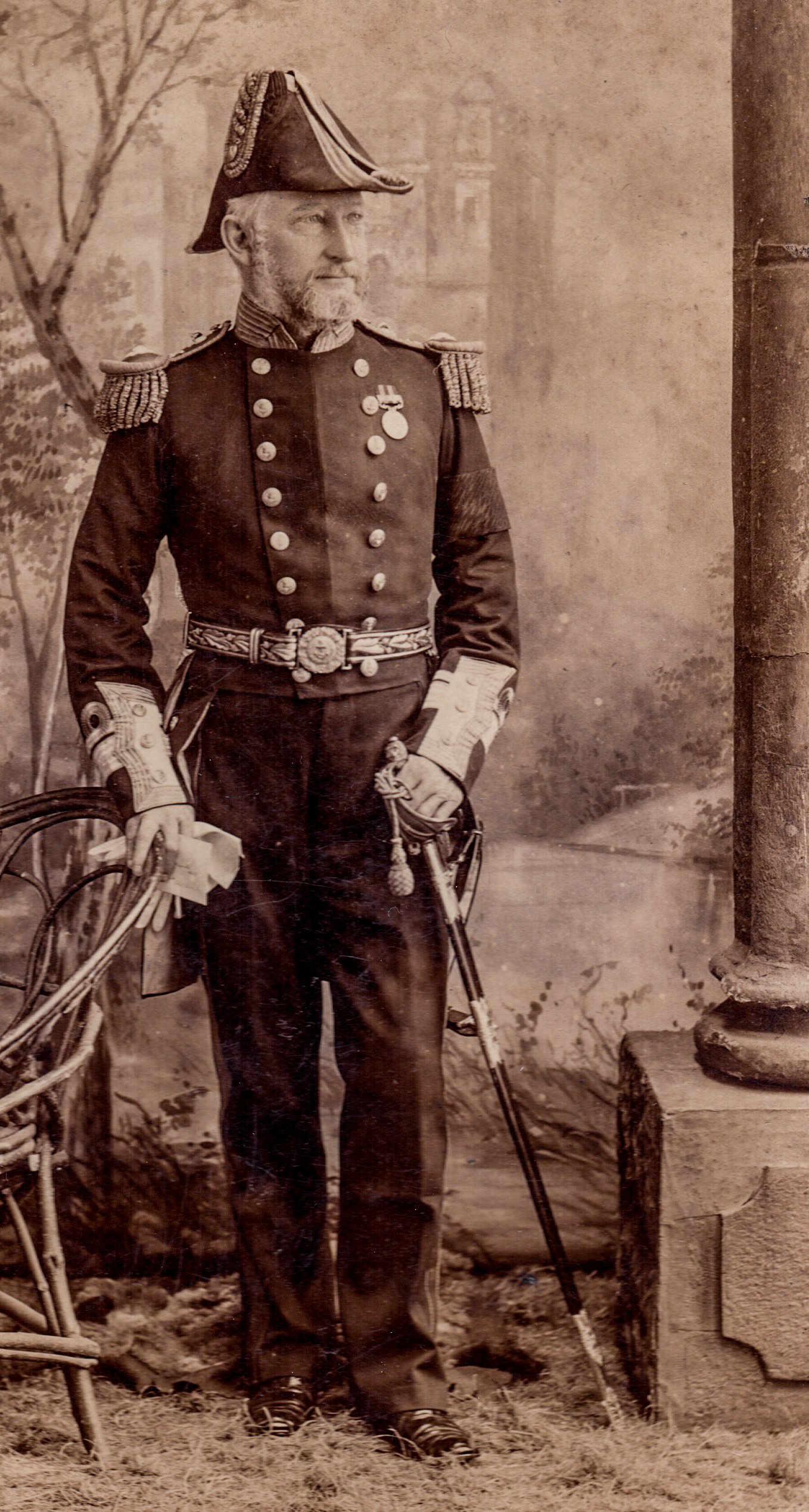
- Vice-Admiral Sir Charles G F Knowles
- Born: 14 March 1832; Vaynor Park, Berriew
- Died: 3 March 1918 (aged 85); Oxford
- Relatives: Francis Knowles (son)
- Military career
- Allegiance: United Kingdom of Great Britain and Ireland
- Branch: Royal Navy
- Service years: 1845-1887
- Rank: Vice-Admiral (United Kingdom)
- Commands: HMS Investigator; HMS Lapwing; HMS Blanche; HMS Shannon

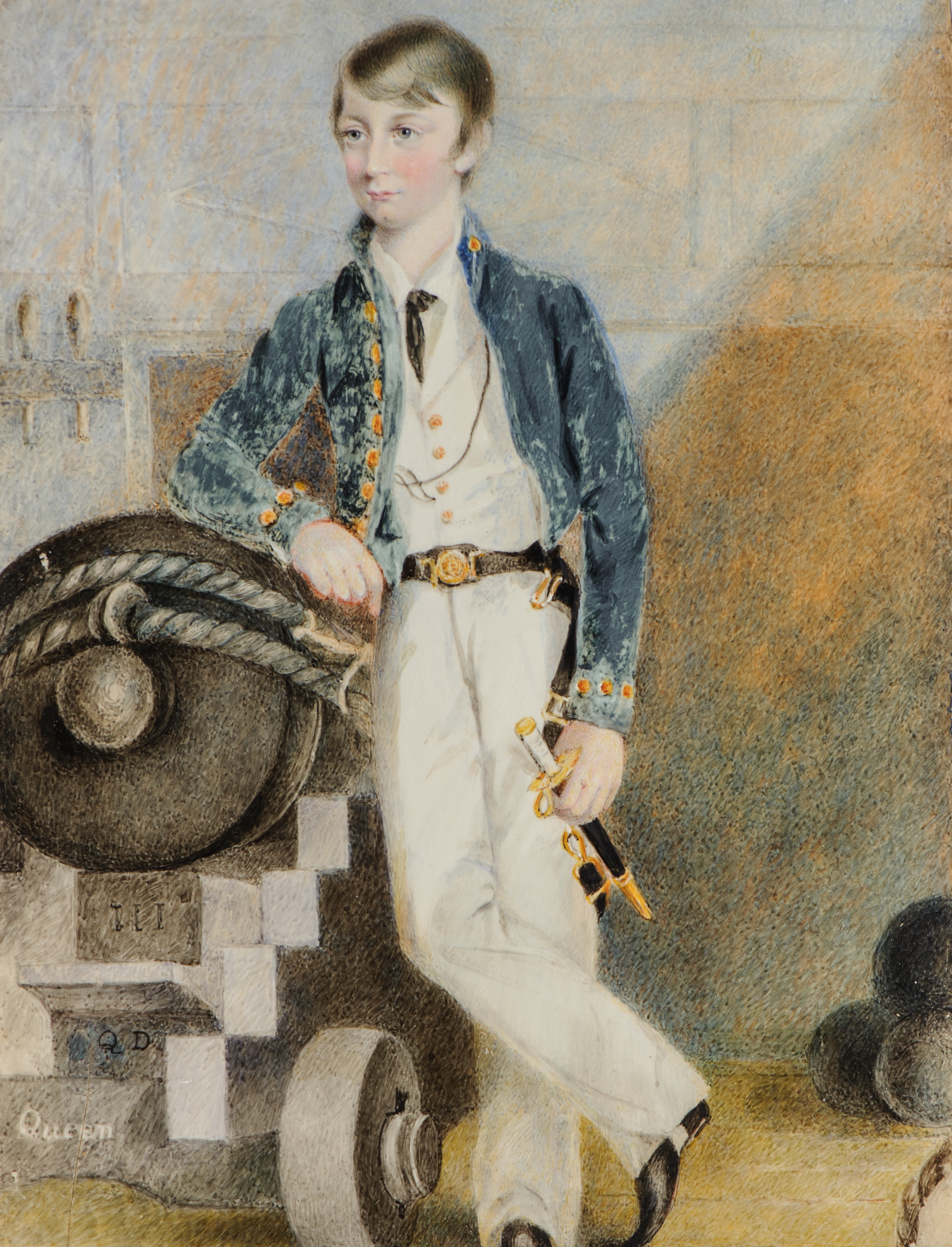
Charles G F Knowles as Midshipman on HMS Queen

Vice-Admiral Sir Charles George Frederick Knowles, 4th Baronet (14 March 1832 – 3 March 1918) was an officer of the Royal Navy, who saw service during the Second Burmese War and was in command of the Niger expedition and quelling uprising at Santa Cruz, eventually rising to the rank of vice-admiral.

== Family and early life ==
This family is descended from Charles Knollys, titular 4th Earl of Banbury temp James II. Knowles was born on 14 March 1832 at Vaynor Park, Berriew, Montgomeryshire, Wales, the son of Sir Francis Charles Knowles 3rd Baronet and his wife Emma Pocock, daughter of Sir George Pocock, 2nd Baronet. He was the fourth of his line since his great grandfather, Sir Charles Knowles, admiral, was created a baronet for purely naval services in 1765. His grandfather, Sir Charles Knowles, followed his own father's career, rising to Admiral, though his son, Knowles' father Sir Francis Charles Knowles, discarded a life in the service to devote himself to the pursuit of science, and succeeded in attaining the blue ribbon of the scientific world - a fellowship of the Royal Society in 1830. On the maternal side also, Knowles had a very distinguished naval pedigree, for his mother was the granddaughter of Admiral Sir George Pocock, the victor of the Havanna, who had been shipmate with the first Sir Charles Knowles whilst midshipmen at the defeat of the Spanish fleet at Cape Pissaro 1718, commanded by his kinsman, Admiral Lord Torrington. It was into a century of general peace that the third admiral of his line was to pursue a more peaceful naval career than that of his forebears. With a fleet larger than any two rivals combined, there were to be no major battles fought, just localised military action buttressed by the Royal Navy.

== Naval Service ==
Knowles joined the navy on 21 May 1845 at the age of fourteen as a midshipman and served as a naval cadet in HMS Queen from 21 May 1845 – 22 August 1846, HMS Constance from 23 August 1846 – 8 December 1849 and the sloop HMS Contest from 9 December 1849 – 21 May 1851 when appointed acting mate whilst in Shanghai, aged twenty, six years since joining, and mate; He was promoted an acting lieutenant in a death vacancy in HMS Fox on 8 October 1852 under the command of Commodore (later Admiral Sir) George Lambert during the latter part of the Second Burmese war of 5 April 1852 – 20 December 1852; Burmese Medal;

He was appointed Lieutenant 7 February 1853; serving in the East Indies, joining HMS Wolverene at Chatham 17 June 1854 – 26 November 1855; HMS Sappho on the west coast of Africa 22 January 1856 – 10 March 1856 when discharged from hospital; HMS Raven as Lt Commander 20 March 1856 – 17 May 1856; HMS Prometheus on the west coast of Africa 18 May 1856 – 15 Sept 1857; HMS Archer at Woolwich 21 May 1858 – 9 June 1859; He received the thanks of the admiralty for the salvage of HMS Ardent when stranded on the west coast of Africa in 1858; HMS Royal Adelaide at Devonport 6 April – 25 June 1860; HMS Terrible in the Mediterranean 26 June 1860 – 20 May 1861; HMS St Vincent a 120 gun first rate ship of the line used as a training ship at Portsmouth 27 August 1861 – 20 January 1864;

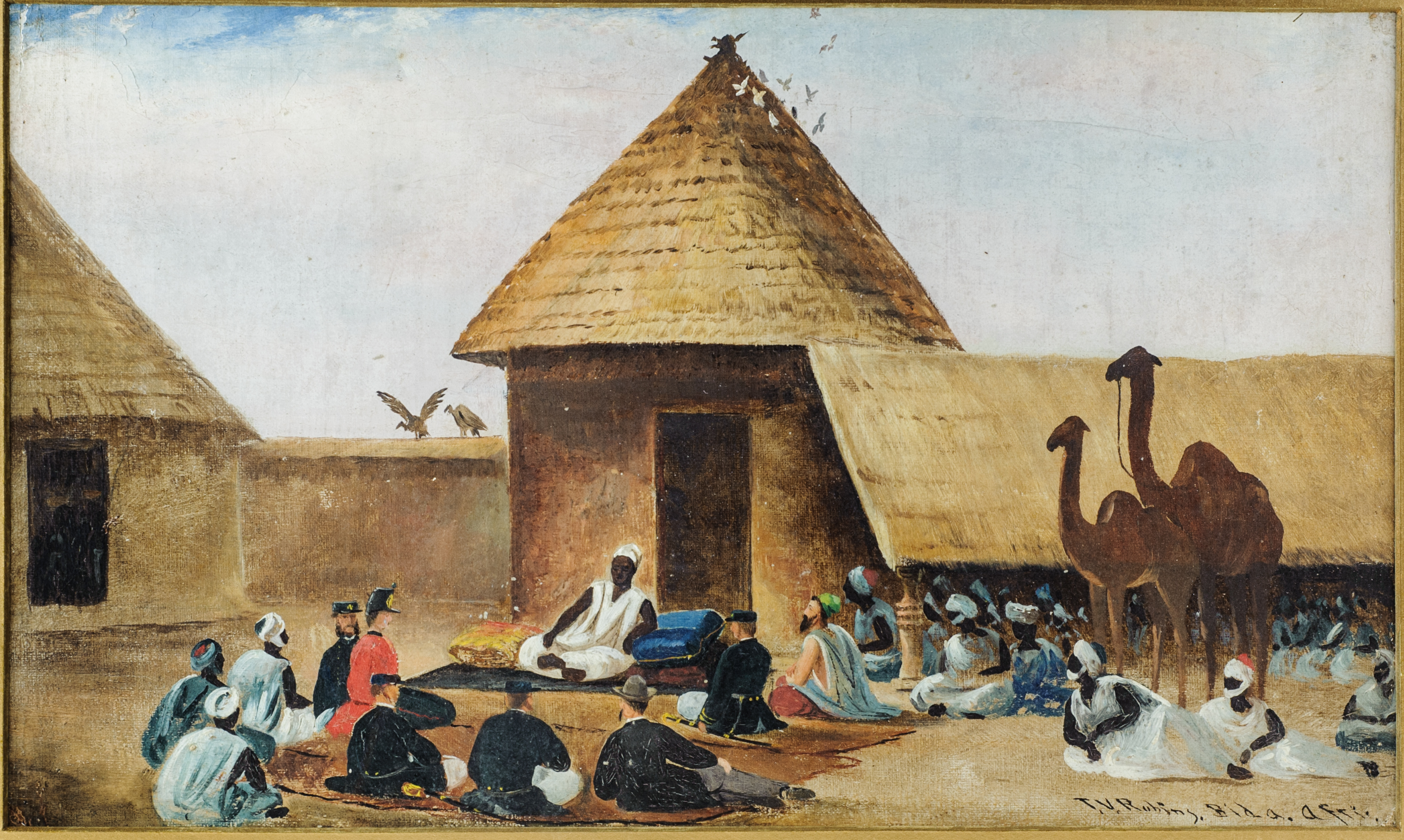
At Bida on the Niger 1864, Knowles is the officer in the flat cap seated on the left of the chief with an interpreter in a green turban; T.V. Robins artist

Command of a "gunboat" in the nineteenth century provided valuable experience for the Royal Navy's junior officers and he was put in command of HMS Investigator, a 149-ton wooden paddle survey vessel with two gun armaments launched on 16 November 1861, in the ascent of the Niger of August–October 1864; to meet with the explorer Dr, William Balfour Baikie and was invalided from Ascension Island 1864; He kept a detailed journal in which he recorded the places visited, a study of the people met and a narrative of the voyage. A resume was published in the Royal Geographical Society Journal in January 1865 and Part of "The Journal of Lieutenant Charles Knowles in the river Niger, 1864" published in The Naval Miscellany; On 1 March 1865 he was appointed Commander, and on 11 Sept 1865 he was appointed Inspecting Commander of the South Yarmouth Division of the Coastguard in HMS Irresistible.

On 29 November 1872 he was appointed captain and given command of HMS Lapwing, a plover class wooden screw gunvessal. On 3 June 1870, engaged in the protection of the Newfoundland fisheries until 14 Nov 1872. He gained the thanks of the admiralty dated 4 April 1872 for service on the coast of Cuba during the Cuban insurrection of 1870–71, and received the thanks dated 31 May 1873 of the Colonial Service for fishery service off the coast of Newfoundland when in command of the Lapwing.

Knowles joined at Sheerness as Senior Naval Officer of the Barbados Division in the West Indies in command of HMS Blanche, a 1760-ton, 6 gun Eclipse class wooden screw sloop (launched in 1867 and sold off for breaking in 1886), from 4th Sept 1877 - 26 November 1881; He was thanked by the admiralty for services in quelling the uprising in the Danish Island of Santa Cruz in 1880; then appointed Captain in command of HMS Shannon, the first British armoured cruiser and last Royal Navy ironclad to be built with a retractable propeller to reduce drag when under sail (launched 1875 and scrapped 1899), ship of first reserve, coastguard, Greenock on the north coast of Ireland from 4 August 1885; He finally retired from active service on 14 March 1887, having spent a total of fourteen years and two hundred and twenty days at sea; Rear-Admiral 1 January 1889; Vice-Admiral 18 January 1894.

== Family and issue ==
Knowles married firstly Elizabeth Chapman in 1861 and had two sons and three daughters. He married secondly Mary Ellen Thomson on 11 June 1882, the grand daughter of the Hon Joseph Howe, Lt Gov of Nova Scotia. They had three sons and two daughters. He succeeded to the baronetcy on the death of his father in 1892 and died aged 85 at Oxford on 3 March 1918 and is buried at Ryde on the Isle of Wight. He was succeeded as baronet by his eldest son from the second marriage, Francis Knowles.

== See also ==
- Knowles Baronets

== Notes ==
Baronetage of Great Britain
Preceded by Francis C Knowles	Baronet (of Lovell Hill); 1892–1917	Succeeded by Francis HS Knowles
