= Jason Knowles =

American investigative journalist

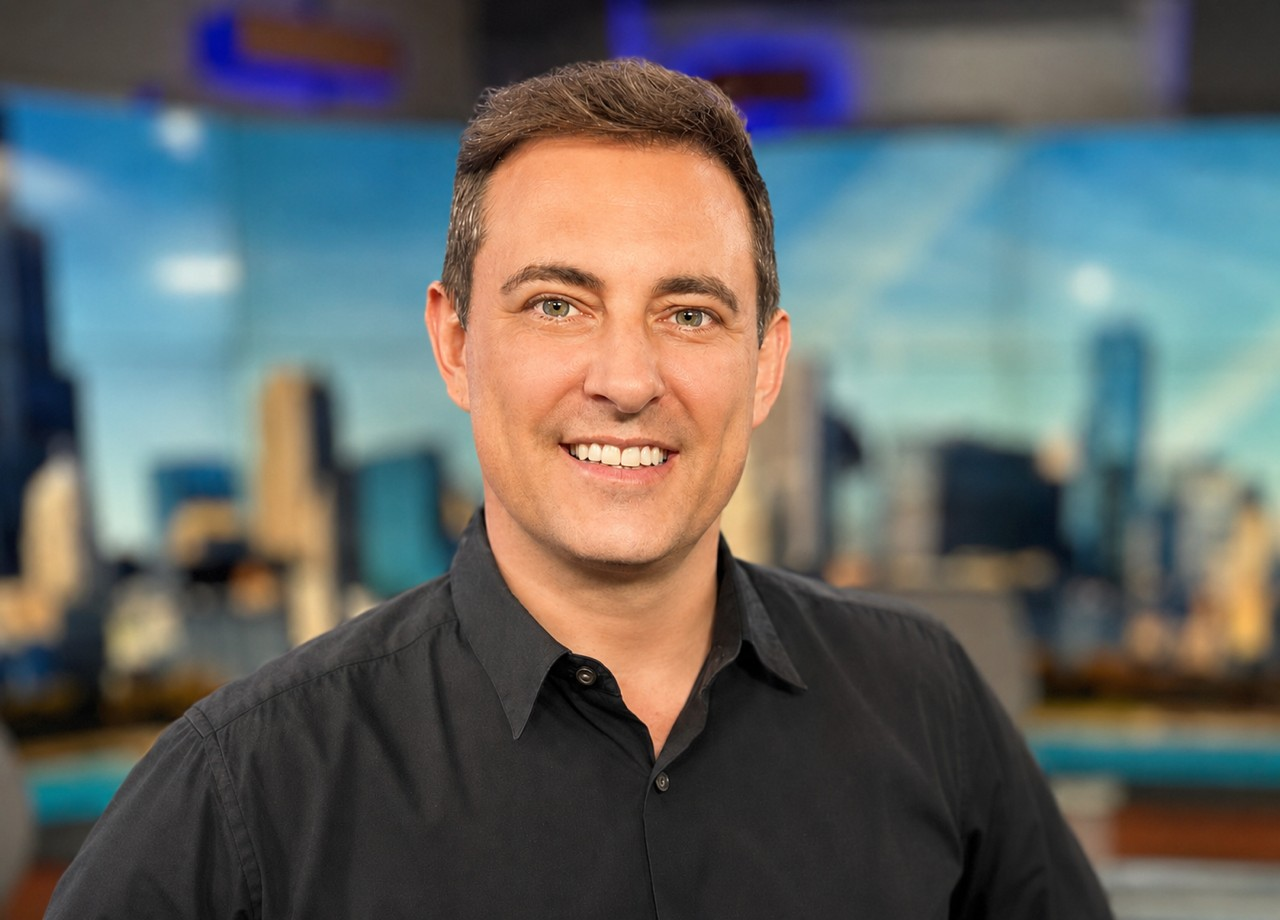
- Jason Knowles
- Born: Cleveland, Ohio, U.S.
- Education: Bowling Green State University
- Occupation: Investigative journalist
- Employer: ABC 7 Chicago

Jason Knowles is an American investigative journalist and consumer investigative reporter. He launched the consumer investigative unit for the I-Team at ABC 7 Chicago in 2014. He has won multiple Chicago/Midwest Emmy Awards for his investigative reports and news coverage.

== Early life and education ==
Knowles is a native of Cleveland, Ohio. He attended Bowling Green State University (BGSU), where he graduated with a degree in Communications and Journalism.

== Career ==
Knowles began his broadcasting career as a reporter and weekend anchor at WKAG-TV in Hopkinsville, Kentucky. He later worked at WTVG (13 ABC) in Toledo, Ohio from 1997 to 2004, where he developed consumer and investigative stories as an on-air reporter.

In June 2004, Knowles relocated to Chicago to join WLS-TV (ABC 7) as a special projects producer. In 2009, he became an on-air general assignment reporter for the station.

On January 20, 2014, Knowles was named a full-time consumer investigative reporter, joining Chuck Goudie's I-Team unit. He focuses mainly on uncovering scams, safety recalls, data breaches, and holding public officials and companies accountable. Knowles' reporting has led to substantial government action. For example, his investigation into wait times for DNA testing at crime labs led the Illinois State Police to significantly revamp their facilities.

He has also reported extensively on consumer and environmental issues, including the cardboard footprint of online shopping, the increase in styrofoam and plastic waste from takeout containers during the COVID-19 pandemic, and the risks that chip credit cards pose to their users. Knowles has also been a guest in programs for WLS-AM and WGN Radio.

In 2009, Knowles won a Chicago/Midwest Emmy Award for his contributions to WLS-TV's coverage of the 2009 presidential inauguration of Barack Obama. In 2023, Knowles received a 2022–2023 Chicago/Midwest Emmy Award for Outstanding Achievement for News Gathering - Environment/Science for his investigative report, "Plastic Bags Tracked."

In 2019, Knowles reported that some Chicago red light camera intersections gave drivers significantly shorter green and yellow lights, reducing the time they had to legally cross and increasing their chances of being ticketed. Additionally, he has uncovered square footage assessment errors and massive refund delays within the Cook County Assessor's Office.

== Personal life ==
Knowles is a member of the National Lesbian and Gay Journalists Association (NLGJA). He is active in ABC 7 Chicago's year-round "Pride 365" programming and has reported live from the Chicago Pride Parade.
