= Conrad Knowles =

(1810–1844) actor and manager

- Born: 1810
- Died: 1844 (aged 33–34)

Conrad Theodore Knowles (1810 – 19 May 1844), born in England, was an Australian actor and theatre manager. With no formal training, he became a versatile and accomplished actor, and his roles included several Shakespearian parts; he was the first actor in the country to play Hamlet and King Lear.

== Early years in Australia ==
Knowles was born in England in 1810. His father John Knowles, a Wesleyan minister, "was induced to let his son indulge his natural disposition for travel and adventure"; Knowles was an early emigrant to the Swan River Colony (later Perth). The colony experienced difficulties and in April 1830 he arrived in Hobart Town, where he was a tutor of drawing and languages.

He later moved to Sydney, where distant relatives lived. The Theatre Royal opened in 1832 and, although he had no theatrical experience, he became an actor at the theatre. He was unwilling to lose the friendship of his Wesleyan relatives, and at first appeared as Mr Cooper, but eventually he left the Methodist church. From the second season he used his own name; he was acting manager, and played melodramatic, tragic and comic roles. He played major Shakespearian roles; he was Australia's first Hamlet and King Lear.

He was a favourite with Sydney audiences. Although he was criticized for not closely studying his parts, it was acknowledged that he played many roles and had managerial duties. He had a relationship with Harriet Jones, an actress who had appeared in Sydney since 1826; from 1839 she was usually known as Mrs Knowles.

In May 1837 he sailed for England to join his brother's legal firm; he returned, for his health, in October 1838. Having seen William Macready and other notable actors in London, his subsequent acting was more refined.

== Rival theatres in Sydney ==
In 1838 the Royal Victoria Theatre opened in Sydney, and Knowles performed there, in 1840 becoming stage manager. He wrote a play, Salathiel, a dramatization of Leila; or, The Siege of Granada by Edward Bulwer-Lytton, and it was produced in 1842, being performed twice.

In 1842 the Olympic Theatre, an elaborate tent created by Luigi Dalle Case for his circus performances, opened in Hunter Street. Knowles and Harriet moved there, and Knowles soon became manager After a few months they returned to the Victoria Theatre, where there was a new leading player with a professional background, F. Nesbitt McCrone. In May 1843 he moved to the Royal City Theatre, a small theatre in Market Street opened by Joseph Simmons, an actor-manager; however it closed after a few weeks.

== Final year ==
Later that year Knowles, in Melbourne, opened a temporary 500-seat theatre, The Pavilion, in Bourke Street. On 4 September he produced Othello, the first Shakespeare play performed in the colony.

Knowles died on 19 May 1844, after a short illness. An obituary commented that since he began his acting career, "he has laboured... to advance the interests of the profession, of which he was so distinguished an ornament, with credit to himself and gratification to the play-going public, who have now to regret the loss of a sterling actor, and an accomplished but unfortunate gentleman."
