= Francis Gerald William Knowles =

British biologist (1915–1974)

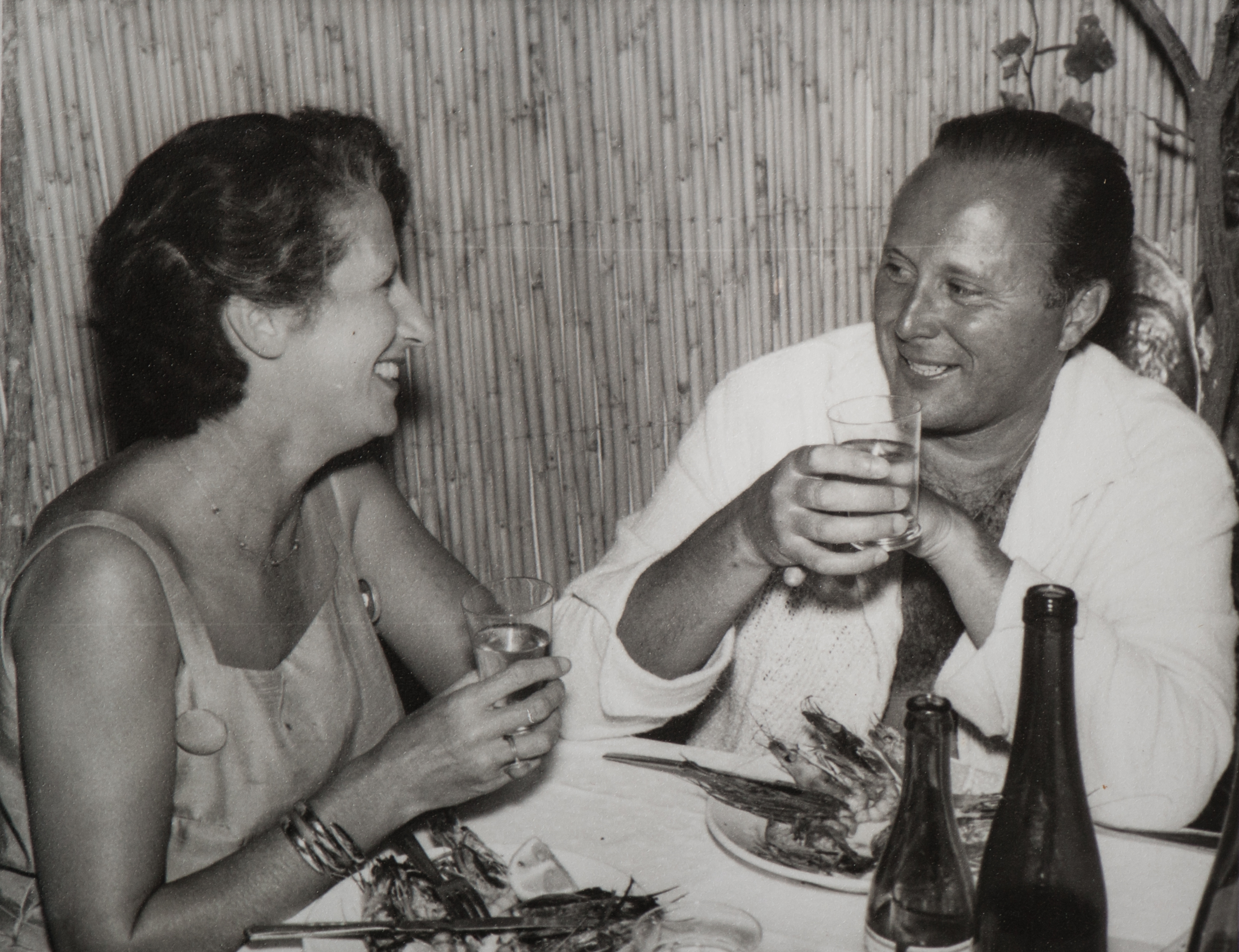
Sir Francis & Lady Knowles often based themselves on Capri when he was undertaking research work in Naples from 1939 until his death

Sir Francis Gerald William Knowles, 6th baronet (9 March 1915 – 13 July 1974) was a distinguished British research biologist and zoologist, a Fellow of the Royal Society, who held the chair of anatomy at King's College London where he was Dean, to which he had come by a somewhat unorthodox route. He was, as The Times put it, "a fundamental scientist of outstanding calibre".

== Family and early life ==
Knowles was born at Ottawa, Ontario, Canada, where his father Francis Howe Seymour Knowles, 5th baronet (1886–1953) held the post of Physical Anthropologist for the Anthropological Division of the Geological Survey of Canada (now part of the Canadian Museum of Civilisation) from 1912 to 1919, when he returned to England on his succession to the baronetcy.

Knowles was educated back in England, at Radley College and at Oriel College, Oxford, reading zoology and graduating in 1936. Following graduation, he was awarded the Oxford University Naples scholarship, which enabled him to carry out research at the Stazione Zoologica, Italy, in 1937–8, where he began investigating the role of hormones in the regulation of colour change in lampreys and crustaceans. He was awarded his MA and PhD in 1939.

== Career ==
After his scholarship ended in 1938, Knowles took up the post of senior biology master at Marlborough College in Wiltshire. Whilst at Marlborough he published several biological texts, including Man and other Living Things (1945), Diagrams of Human Biology (1950), Biology and Man (1950), Freshwater and Salt-water Aquaria (1953), and Endocrine Control in Crustaceans (1959, with David B. Carlisle). He also continued his researches on crustacean colour change, working during school holidays at marine biological laboratories with support from the Royal Society and the Nuffield Foundation. During this period he published many papers, most of them dealing specifically with the control of pigment movement and colour change. The choice of crustaceans as his experimental animals (made, as he remarked, because no Home Office licence was required for invertebrates) was a happy one. These activities gave his pupils an insight into scientific research that would have been found in very few other schools during this period.

In his later years at Marlborough, Knowles became aware of the new perspectives that had been opened in comparative endocrinology through the discovery of neurosecretion: the process by which certain nerve cells secrete hormones into the bloodstream. He was quick to exploit this concept, making skilful use of a variety of new techniques, including use of the electron microscope, which became his special interest. Meanwhile, by 1939, he had both an M.A. and D.Phil., and in 1949 was awarded the Browne Fund Scholarship of the Royal Society. He then spent a sabbatical term in Bermuda, and in 1953 received a Nuffield Foundation Scholarship.

1958 was to be a crucial year for Knowles. Professor Sir Solly (later Solly Zuckerman, Baron Zuckerman), whilst chairing a biological meeting at Cold Spring Harbor in the United States, had been deeply impressed by the quality of Knowles' contributions. Zuckerman had known Knowles from when he had been an undergraduate in Oxford, and was already familiar with his work on invertebrate neurosecretion. He asked Knowles whether Marlborough could offer opportunities for carrying on his work. When Knowles replied that it could not, Zuckerman undertook to try to persuade the medical faculty at the University of Birmingham to appoint him to a lectureship in the Department of Anatomy there. As Knowles knew nothing of human gross anatomy (although a lot about comparative micro-anatomy) such an appointment was, to say the least, exceptional. It is greatly to the credit of the Birmingham medical faculty of that time that faith in the Department of Anatomy was sufficient to gain acceptance of Zuckerman's views, and Knowles moved from Marlborough to take up a university appointment.

Quickly establishing himself as a dynamic biologist, satisfied with nothing less than perfection in technique, Knowles expanded his researches to include the study of neurosecretory pathways in the brain and pituitary gland of the dogfish and, later, of the rhesus monkey. His observations and his manner of presenting them provided a strong (and sometimes provocative) stimulus to the many biologists who had also discovered the fascination of neurosecretory systems. His papers at scientific meetings were remembered as clear expositions of his theses, and usually gave rise to lively discussion. His flair for organization also showed itself in 1962, when he was largely responsible for the planning behind a NATO Advanced Study Institute on Techniques in Endocrine Research which was held at Stratford upon Avon. His studies brought him a Readership in 1963, and "for his great contributions to science", election as Fellow of the Royal Society in 1966 and a personal Chair, with the title of Professor of Comparative Endocrinology, in 1967. In that year, however, he moved to the University of London as professor of anatomy at King's College London.

At King's, Knowles soon abandoned primate research and turned once again to fish, despite the obvious difficulties of working on these animals from a London base. He took a full share in administration, serving with distinction as dean. It was perhaps during these last years that his skill as a chairman of committees became truly apparent, and he played a significant role in college affairs. He was also a member of several Royal Society Committees, including the Browne Research Fund Committee, and the Naples Zoological Station Committee (from its establishment in 1960). He represented the Royal Society on the Scientific Research in Schools Committee from 1971, and was the representative of the Nuffield Foundation on the Royal Society Commonwealth Bursaries Committee from June 1972. He was Chairman of the Biological Sciences Committee of the Science Research Council and a member of the Council of the Marine Biological Association of the United Kingdom. One of his major concerns was the furthering of research links between young biologists in Britain and other European countries.

In September 1973 he organized the sixth international symposium on neurosecretion, which was held in London. He took particular pleasure in the task, for this was the twentieth anniversary of the first symposium, where he had presented the results of his pioneering crustacean studies. He opened the programme with a retrospective address on "Twenty Years of Neuroscretion".

He died suddenly in 1974 at the comparatively young age of 59, before completing the editorial work on the volume summarising the proceedings of the symposium (Neurosecretion – the final endocrine pathway). In a tribute from his fellow editors at Springer-Verlag, they recalled " a highly distinguished investigator, a scholar with unusually broad interest, a man with a keen, analytical mind and critical judgement who enjoyed life to the fullest. His vibrant personality radiated warmth and excitement: his presence always added lustre to a scientific gathering."

== Personal life ==
In 1948 Knowles married Ruth Jessie Brooke-Smith, the daughter of the Rev Arthur Brooke-Smith. They had one son, Charles Francis (b. 1951) who succeeded to the baronetcy, and three daughters, as well as a stepdaughter born to Ruth and her first husband, Dickie Hulse, an RAF fighter pilot killed in action during the Second World War.

In 1953 he succeeded to the baronetcy on the death of his father, and in 1955 purchased Avebury Manor from Alexander Keiller, whose excavations of the Avebury stone circle had been ended by the outbreak of war in 1939. Restoration of the house became an absorbing love. "Many would remember Francis as a most excellent host, whether in the elegantly furnished rooms of his house in Edgbaston or in later years at his flat in Mayfair. Particularly memorable, however, was his hospitality at his beautiful Elizabethan house at Avebury, where he and his wife, Ruth, entertained so many people". The house was opened to the public in May 1956, but also served as a grand family home. Set against this background, remote from academic biology, he appeared to one of his colleagues as "a fascinating man who would really have been more at home in the eighteenth century". To another he gave proof that "one could be both a distinguished scholar and a warm vibrant person".

Knowles died in London on 13 July 1974. He is buried in the churchyard of St James, Avebury, next to the house he had restored.

== See also ==
- Knowles Baronets

Baronetage of Great Britain
Preceded by Francis Knowles	Baronet (of Lovell Hill); 1953–1974	Succeeded by Charles Francis Knowles
