= Albert Knowles (footballer) =

English footballer

Personal information
- Full name: Albert Knowles
- Date of birth: 1 June 1871
- Place of birth: Wiswell, England
- Date of death: 1950 (aged 78–79)
- Position: Goalkeeper

Senior career*
| Years | Team | Apps | (Gls) |
| 1893–1894 | Clitheroe | | |
| 1894–1896 | Whalley & District | | |
| 1897–1900 | Blackburn Rovers | 31 | (0) |
| Total | | 31 | (0) |
- * Club domestic league appearances and goals

Albert Knowles (1 June 1871 – 1950) was an English footballer who played in the Football League for Blackburn Rovers.
