= Harriet Knowles =

Australian stage actor and singer

Harriet Jones (died after 1845), also known under her stage names Mrs Love (1826–1839) and Mrs Knowles (1839–1845) was an Australian stage actress and singer. She was the first female professional performer in Australia.

== Life ==
Harriet Jones arrived in Sydney in Australia in 1825. She is known to have performed as a singer in amateur concerts in Sydney from 1826 onward.

She played the main female role of Susan in Douglas Jerrold's Black Eyed Susan on the temporary stage of Barnett Levey's Theatre Royal, Sydney at the Royal Hotel on 26 December 1832. This was the inauguration performance of the first theater of Australia, the Theatre Royal (which was given its own building the following year), and the first professional theater performance in Australia, thereby making Harriet Jones (then known as "Mrs Love") the first professional actress in Australia alongside the two other actresses participating in the performance: a "Mrs Ward" and a "Mrs Weston" (Frances Mackay, later known as Mrs Laverty, Mrs Mackay, Mrs Arabin).

Harriet Jones was from the beginning lovers with her colleague and co-player Conrad Theodore Knowles (1810-1844), who acted in the inauguration play with her, and she was from 1839 onward known as Mrs Knowles, though the never formally married. They both belonged to the first pioneer generation of professional Australian actors at the Theatre Royal, the first theater in the colony. When the Olympic Theatre opened in February 1842, she followed Knowles there with other leading players, but they returned just three months later. In 1843, she followed Knowles to Melbourne, where she is known to have been active until at least 1845.
