= Gibbons baronets of Stanwell Place (1752) =

Baronetcy

Escutcheon of the Gibbons baronets of Stanwell Place

The Gibbons baronetcy, of Stanwell Place in the County of Middlesex, was created in the Baronetage of Great Britain on 21 April 1752 for Sir William Gibbons, a planter in Barbados and Speaker of its House of Assembly.

The 2nd Baronet sat as Member of Parliament for Stockbridge and Wallingford. The 5th Baronet was High Sheriff of Middlesex in 1891.

== Gibbons baronets, of Stanwell Place (1752) ==
- Sir William Gibbons, 1st Baronet (died 1760)
- Sir John Gibbons, 2nd Baronet (c. 1717–1776)
- Sir William Gibbons, 3rd Baronet (1749–1814)
- Sir John Gibbons, 4th Baronet (1774–1844)
- Sir John Gibbons, 5th Baronet (1825–1893)
- Sir Charles Gibbons, 6th Baronet (1828–1909)
- Sir Alexander Doran Gibbons, 7th Baronet (1873–1956)
- Sir John Edward Gibbons, 8th Baronet (1914–1982)
- Sir William Edward Doran Gibbons, 9th Baronet (born 1948)

The heir apparent is the present holder's son Charles William Edwin Gibbons (born 1983).

== Extended family ==
- Frederick Kenrick Colquhoun Gibbons (1865–1954), son of Captain Frederick Gibbons, brother of the 5th Baronet, was a captain in the Royal Navy.
- Sir William Kenrick Gibbons (1876–1957), son of Sir William Gibbons, grandson of Robert Gibbons, fourth son of the 2nd Baronet, was Clerk of the House of Commons.

== Notes ==
Baronetage of Great Britain
| Preceded by Vanneck baronets | Gibbons baronets of Stanwell Place; 21 April 1752 | Succeeded by Knollys baronets |
