= Robert Knollys =

Robert Knollys may refer to:

- Robert Knolles (c. 1320–1407), also known as Knollys, English soldier of the Hundred Years' War
- Robert Knollys (courtier) (died 1521), also known as Knolles, English courtier in the service of Henry VII and Henry VIII of England
- Robert Knollys (MP for Breconshire) (1547–1619), MP for Reading and Breconshire and grandson of the above
- Robert Knollys (politician, died 1626), MP for Reading (UK Parliament constituency)
- Robert Knollys (politician, died 1659) (1588–1659), MP for Abingdon and Wallingford and nephew of Robert Knollys (died 1619)

== See also ==
- Robert Knowles (disambiguation), same pronunciation
