= Michael Knowles =

Michael Knowles may refer to:

- Michael Knowles (actor) (born 1937), English actor and scriptwriter
- Michael Knowles (politician) (born 1942), British Conservative Member of Parliament
- Michael Knowles (film producer), English film producer
- Michael Knowles (rugby league) (born 1987), English rugby player
- Michael Knowles (political commentator) (born 1990), American author and conservative political commentator
- Michael Knowles, American film director of The Trouble with Bliss
- David Knowles (scholar) (Michael Clive Knowles, 1896–1974), English monk and scholar
