= Viscount Knollys =

Viscountcy in the Peerage of the United Kingdom

Viscountcy Knollys
- Per pale gules and argent on a chevron three roses counterchanged barbed and seeded proper
- Creation date: 4 July 1911
- Created by: King George V
- Peerage: Peerage of the United Kingdom
- First holder: Francis Knollys, 1st Baron Knollys
- Present holder: Patrick Knollys, 4th Viscount Knollys
- Heir apparent: Hon. Alexander Knollys
- Remainder to: Heirs male of the first viscount's body lawfully begotten
- Seat: Bramerton Grange
- Motto: In utrumque paratus ("Ready for both")

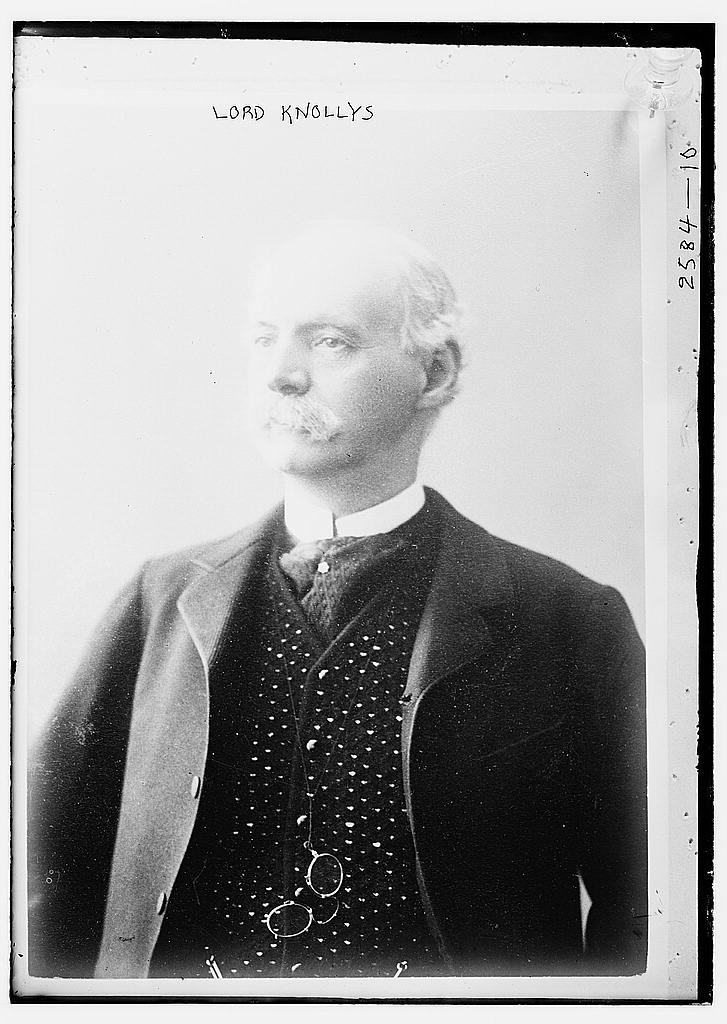
Francis Knollys, 1st Viscount Knollys

Viscount Knollys (/noʊlz/), of Caversham in the County of Oxford, is a title in the Peerage of the United Kingdom. It was created in 1911 for the court official Francis Knollys, 1st Baron Knollys, Private Secretary to the Sovereign from 1901 to 1913. He had been previously created Baron Knollys, of Caversham in the County of Oxford, on 21 July 1902. His son, the second Viscount, served as Governor of Bermuda. As of 2023 the titles are held by the latter's grandson, the fourth Viscount, who succeeded in 2023. The third Viscountess Knollys (d. 2022) was a sister of Baron Farnham: she served as Vice Lord-Lieutenant of Norfolk.

The Viscounts Knollys are members of the prominent Knollys family (pronounced "Nohlz") and are descended in the senior male line from William Knollys, 1st Earl of Banbury. This earldom is considered to have become extinct on the first Earl's death but the extinction has been contested up to the present day. For more information on this, see the Earl of Banbury.

The family seat is Bramerton Grange, near Norwich, Norfolk.

== Viscounts Knollys (1911) ==
- Francis Knollys, 1st Viscount Knollys (1837–1924)
- Edward George William Tyrwhitt Knollys, 2nd Viscount Knollys (1895–1966)
- David Francis Dudley Knollys, 3rd Viscount Knollys (1931–2023)
- Patrick Nicholas Mark Knollys, 4th Viscount Knollys (born 1962)

== Line of succession ==
- Francis Knollys, 1st Viscount Knollys (1837–1924)
  - Edward Knollys, 2nd Viscount Knollys (1895–1966)
    - David Knollys, 3rd Viscount Knollys (1931–2023)
      - Patrick Knollys, 4th Viscount Knollys (b. 1962)
        - (1) Hon. Alexander Knollys (b. 2000)
      - (2) Hon. Christopher Knollys (b. 1964)
        - (3) Edmund Knollys (b. 2000)
      - (4) Hon. Michael Knollys (b. 1968)

== See also ==
- Earl of Banbury
- Knollys family
- Knollys Baronets
- Knowles baronets
