= Knowles =

Knowles may refer to:

== People ==
- Knowles (surname)

== Places in the United States ==
- Knowles, California
- Knowles, Oklahoma
- Knowles, Wisconsin

== See also ==
- Knowles Baronets, two Baronetcies created in the Baronetage of Great Britain and the United Kingdom
