= Sir Francis Knollys, 1st Baronet =

Escutcheon of the Knollys baronets of Thame

Sir Francis Knollys, 1st Baronet (1721/2–1772) was an English politician, Member of Parliament for Reading from 1761 to 1768.

== Life ==
He was the son of Richard Knollys and his wife Elizabeth Thayer, and nephew of Francis Knollys. He matriculated at St John's College, Oxford in 1739, aged 17, graduating M.A. in 1744.

Knollys was created a baronet on 1 April 1754, some months before his uncle died. He was awarded the DCL degree by the University of Oxford in 1756, and was High Sheriff of Oxfordshire in 1757, when his seat was at Thame. At some point after 1751, when it was in the Clayton family, he bought Fernhill Park, Berkshire. John Brooke noted that, at this period, Members of Parliament for Reading "were almost invariably neighbouring landowners". The manor of Battle in Reading was a long-standing Knollys property (or, more precisely, the messuages there were).

== Family ==
Knollys married in 1756 Mary Cater, daughter and heiress of Sir Robert Kendall Cater (died 1738, shortly after being knighted) of Kempston. The couple had no children. Sir Francis Knollys was the last in the direct male line. The property at Battle passed to Francis Prankard, who took the surname Knollys, after claiming through a female line. On Mary's death in 1791, Fernhill Park passed to a kinsman Francis Weldale, who took the surname Knollys.

== Notes ==
Baronetage of Great Britain
Preceded by Gibbons baronets	Knollys baronets of Thame; 1 April 1754	Succeeded by Lamb baronets
