= Robert E. Knowles =

American politician

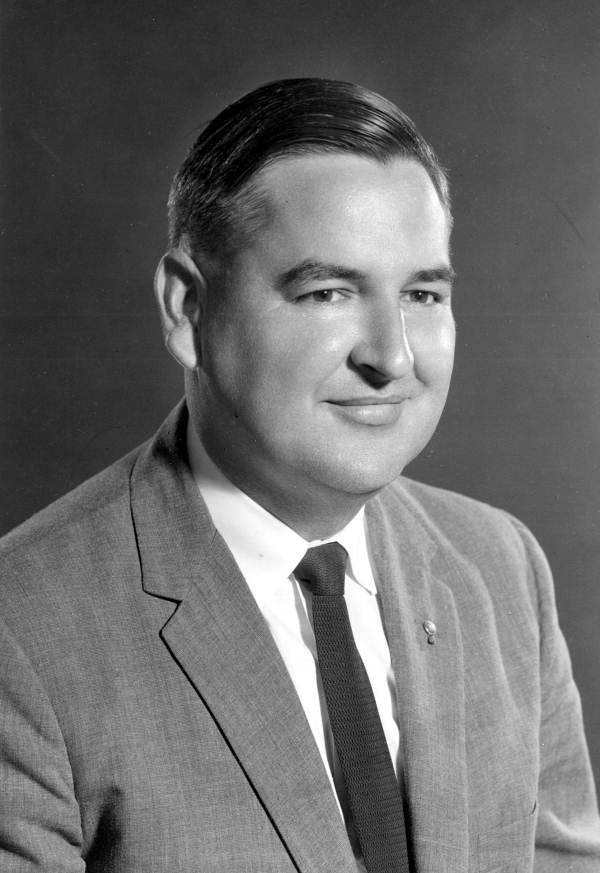
- Knowles in 1961

Member of the Florida House of Representatives from Manatee County
- In office 1959–1963

Personal details
- Born: April 4, 1925 Bradenton, Florida, U.S.
- Died: May 14, 1988 (aged 63)
- Party: Democratic
- Education: Princeton University; University of Florida; Stetson Law School

Robert E. Knowles (April 4, 1925 – May 14, 1988) was an American politician. He served as a Democratic member of the Florida House of Representatives.

== Life and career ==
Knowles was born in Bradenton, Florida. He attended Princeton University, the University of Florida and Stetson Law School.

Knowles served in the Florida House of Representatives from 1959 to 1963.

Knowles died in May 1988, at the age of 63.
