= Knollys baronets =

There have been two baronetcies created for persons with the surname Knollys (/noʊlz/), one in the Baronetage of England and one in the Baronetage of Great Britain. Both creations became extinct on the death of the first holder.

The Knollys Baronetcy, of Grove Place in the County of Southampton, was created in the Baronetage of England on 6 May 1642 for Henry Knollys. The title became extinct on his death in 1648.

The Knollys Baronetcy, of Thame in the County of Oxford, was created in the Baronetage of Great Britain on 1 April 1754 for Francis Knollys, subsequently Member of Parliament for Reading. The title became extinct on his death in 1772.

== Knollys baronets, of Grove Place (1642) ==
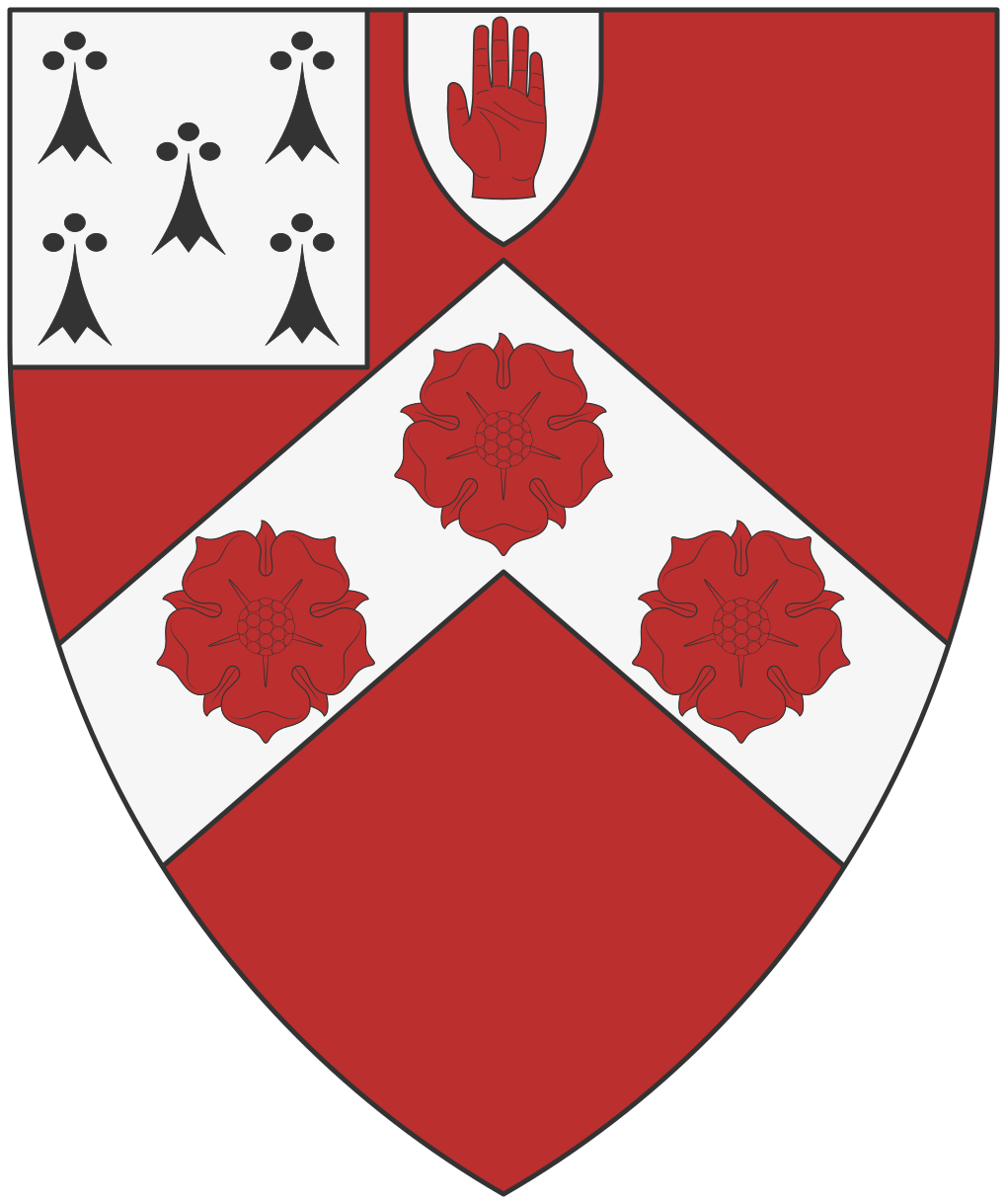
The coat of arms of Knollys of Grove Place, Baronets.

- Sir Henry Knollys, 1st Baronet (c. 1611–1648)

== Knollys baronets, of Thame (1754) ==
Escutcheon of the Knollys baronets of Thame

- Sir Francis Knollys, 1st Baronet (c. 1722–1772)

== See also ==
- Knollys (disambiguation)
- Knollys (surname)
- Knowles baronets
