= William Knollys (British Army officer) =

British Army general (1797–1883)

General The Right Honourable Sir William Knollys KCB
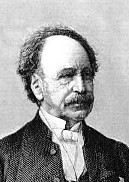
- Born: 1 August 1797
- Died: 23 June 1883 (aged 85)
- Military career
- Allegiance: United Kingdom
- Branch: British Army
- Rank: General
- Commands: Guernsey; Aldershot Division
- Conflicts: Peninsular War
- Awards: Knight Commander of the Order of the Bath

General Sir William Thomas Knollys KCB PC (1 August 1797 – 23 June 1883) was a British Army officer who reached high office in the 1860s.

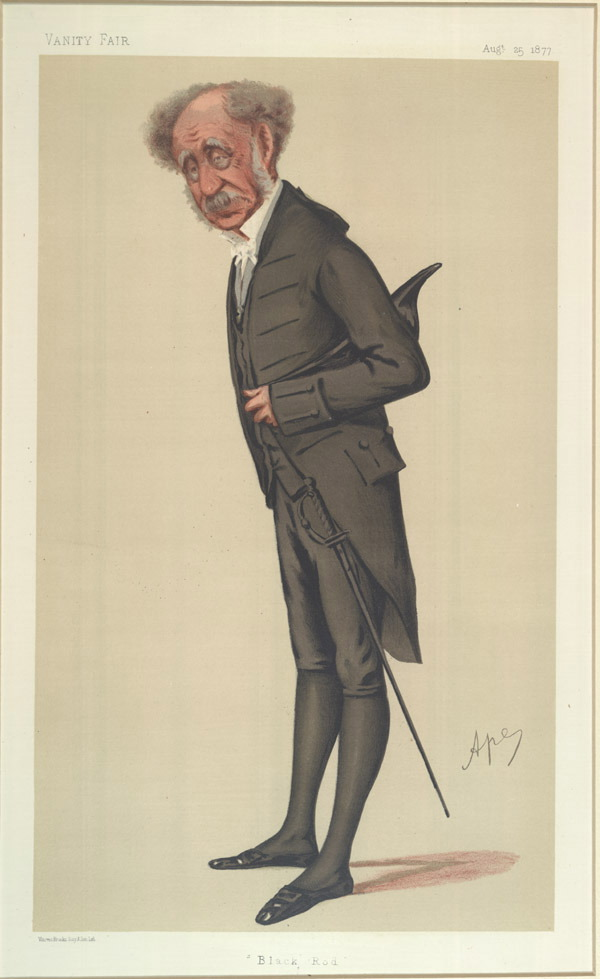
Knollys caricatured by Ape in Vanity Fair, 1877

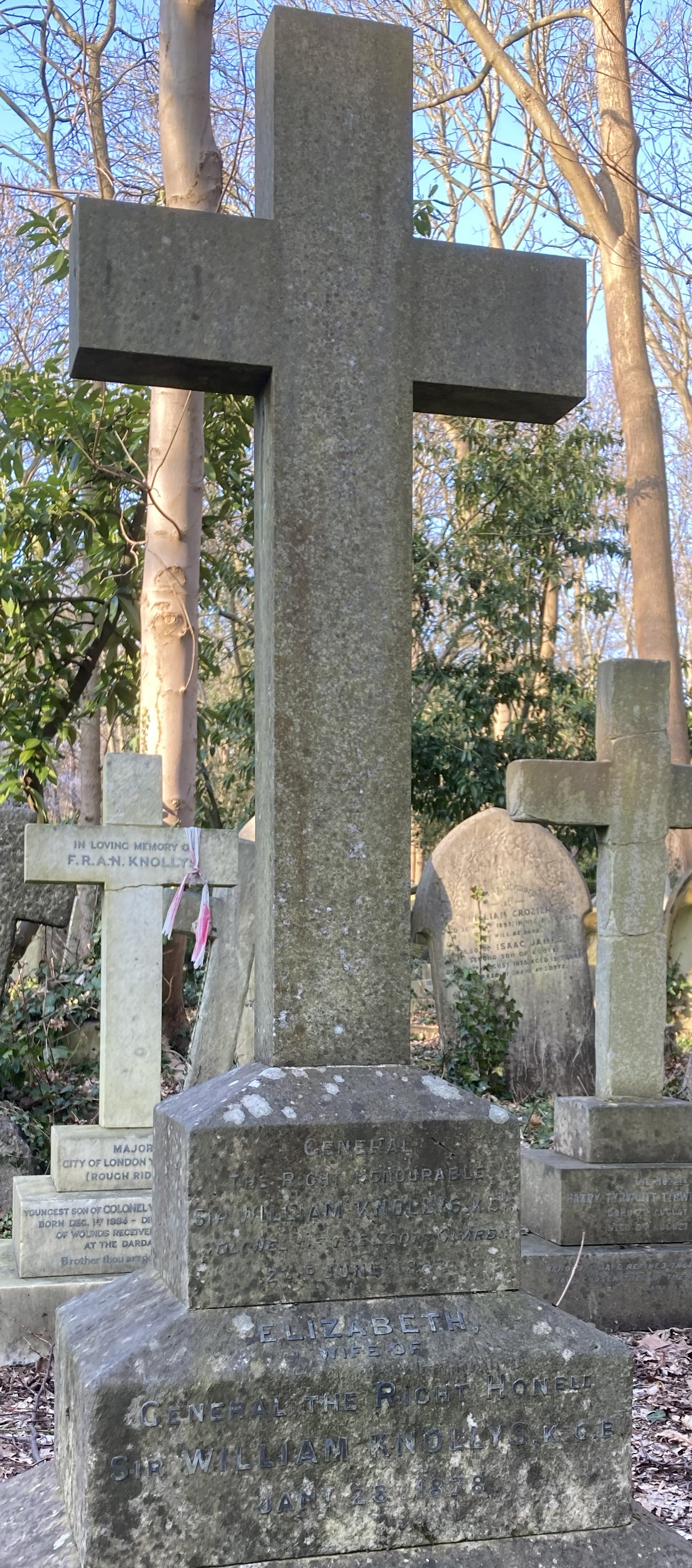
Family grave of Sir William Knollys in Highgate Cemetery (east)

== Military career ==
Born into the Knollys family, he was the son of General William Woods Knollys and Charlotte Martha Blackwell. He was educated at Harrow School and the Royal Military Academy Sandhurst. He was styled Viscount Wallingford until 1813, when his father's claim to the Earldom of Banbury was rejected.

Knollys was commissioned by purchase into the 3rd Foot Guards in 1813 and fought in the Peninsular War later that year. In 1854 he was appointed Lieutenant Governor of Guernsey and then in 1855 he became the first general officer commanding Aldershot Division and was allocated the task of organising his troops into divisions and brigades. Having achieved this task he was made president of the Council of Military Education in 1861.

He held the colonelcy of the 62nd (Wiltshire) Regiment of Foot from 1858 until its amalgamation into the Duke of Edinburgh's (Wiltshire Regiment) in 1881, after which he was colonel of the 1st Battalion of the new regiment. He transferred as colonel to the Scots Guards in 1883 but died later the same year.

In 1862 he was appointed treasurer and comptroller to the Household of Prince of Wales, later King Edward VII. He was sworn in as Privy Counsellor in 1872 and in 1877 made Gentleman Usher of the Black Rod.

He was promoted to full general on 17 June 1866 and made a Knight Commander of the Order of the Bath (KCB) in 1867.

After his death in 1883 at the House of Lords he was buried at Highgate Cemetery (east side).

== Family ==
In 1830 he married Elizabeth St Aubyn, daughter of Sir John St Aubyn, 5th Baronet, and together they went on to have five sons and three daughters.

One of his sons, Francis Knollys, 1st Viscount Knollys (1837–1924), was private secretary to Edward VII and George V and created Baron Knollys in 1902 and Viscount Knollys in 1911. Another son, Sir Henry Knollys (1840–1930), became private secretary to King Edward's daughter Maud, Queen of Norway.

Government offices
| Preceded by Sir John Bell | Lieutenant Governor of Guernsey; 1854–1856 | Succeeded by Sir George Harding |
Military offices
| New title New Post | GOC-in-C Aldershot Division; 1857–1860 | Succeeded by Sir John Pennefather |
Government offices
| Preceded by Sir Augustus Clifford | Gentleman Usher of the Black Rod; 1877–1883 | Succeeded by Sir James Drummond |
Military offices
| Preceded by The Lord Rokeby | Colonel of the Scots Guards; 1883 | Succeeded by The Duke of Connaught and Strathearn |
| Preceded by New Regiment | Colonel of the 2nd Battalion Wiltshire Regiment; 1881–1883 | Succeeded by Sir John Alexander Ewart |
| Preceded by Thomas Lightfoot | Colonel of the 62nd (Wiltshire) Regiment of Foot; 1858–1881 | Succeeded by Amalgamated into the Duke of Edinburgh's (Wiltshire) Regiment |
