= Francis Knollys, 1st Viscount Knollys =

Private secretary to King Edward VII and George V (1837–1924)

The Right Honourable The Viscount Knollys GCB GCVO KCMG ISO PC
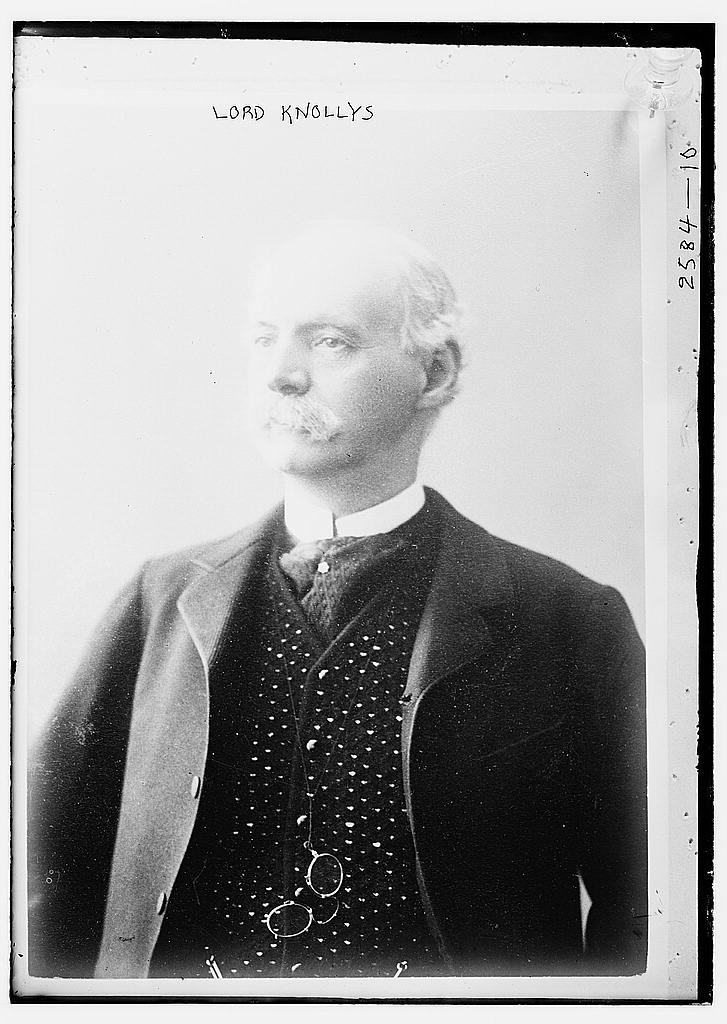

Private Secretary to the Sovereign
- In office 1901–1913 Serving with Lord Stamfordham (Between 1910-1913)
- Monarchs: Edward VII (1901–1910); George V (1910–1913)
- Preceded by: Sir Arthur Bigge
- Succeeded by: Lord Stamfordham

Personal details
- Born: 16 July 1837
- Died: 15 August 1924 (aged 87)
- Parent(s): William Thomas Knollys; Elizabeth St Aubyn
- Education: Royal Military College, Sandhurst

Francis Knollys, 1st Viscount Knollys, GCB, GCVO, KCMG, ISO, PC (16 July 1837 – 15 August 1924) was a British courtier. He served as Private Secretary to the Sovereign from 1901 to 1913.

== Background and education ==
Knollys was the son of Sir William Thomas Knollys (1797–1883), of Blount's Court at Rotherfield Peppard in Oxfordshire, and was educated in Guernsey. He entered the Royal Military College, Sandhurst, in 1851, and was commissioned into the 23rd Foot as an ensign in 1854.

== Career ==
In the following year, however, Knollys joined the Department of the Commissioners of Audit as a junior examiner. In 1862, he became Secretary to the Treasurer to the Prince of Wales. In 1870, he was appointed Private Secretary to the Prince of Wales, an office he held until the Prince, Edward, became King in 1901. He was also Groom-in-Waiting to the Prince of Wales from 1886 to 1901. Knollys then became Private Secretary to the Sovereign, an office he filled until 1913 (jointly with Arthur Bigge, 1st Baron Stamfordham, from 1910). He therefore acted as Edward's Private Secretary for a total of forty years, 1870–1910. He was known for his loyalty and discretion in this role. He was also Gentleman Usher to Queen Victoria from 1868 to 1901, and a Lord-in-waiting to Queen Mary from 1910 to 1924.

== Personal life ==
Lord Knollys married the Honourable Ardyn Mary Tyrwhitt, daughter of Sir Henry Thomas Tyrwhitt, 3rd Baronet, and Harriet Tyrwhitt, 12th Baroness Berners. They had two children: Edward (1895–1966) and Louvima Alexandra (1888–1958). Louvima was a godchild of the three Wales princesses and her name was composed of their three names (Princess Louise, Princess Victoria and Princess Maud).

== Death ==
Lord Knollys died in August 1924, aged 87, and was buried at Highgate Cemetery. His titles were inherited by his eldest son, Edward George William Tyrwhitt Knollys, 2nd Viscount Knollys (1895–1966).

== In popular culture ==
After his appointment as Private Secretary to the Sovereign, Lord Knollys was well known as the public face of the Court, and is often mentioned in memoirs and fiction of the period. In his 1911 novel C.Q., or in the Wireless House, Arthur Train wrote of his fixing a scandal (fictitious, this time):

"She was still spoken of as one of the most beautiful women in the world; but the exquisite hour of her perfection had passed. Then, perhaps feeling that her supremacy was no longer undisputed, a sense of pique at younger and fresher women had led her into certain too flagrant indiscretions that could not be overlooked.

Lord Knollys had intimated that a knighthood might please her husband; and the directorate of the Royal Bank of Edinburgh, of which he was the London manager, by a coincidence no less extraordinary than it was timely, had proposed that he should open a similar branch in New York and temporarily become its resident agent. In other words, royalty had politely indicated that, although it was deeply pained to do so, it must, for policy's sake, at least, withdraw that intimacy which it had previously been pleased to extend".

== Honours ==
Knollys was created a Companion of the Order of the Bath (CB) in 1876, and promoted to Knight Commander (KCB) in 1897 and to Knight Grand Cross (GCB) in 1908. He was also made a Knight Grand Cross of the Royal Victorian Order (GCVO) in 1901, a Knight Commander of the Order of St Michael and St George (KCMG) in 1886, and awarded the Imperial Service Order (ISO) in 1903. It was announced in the 1902 Coronation Honours that he would receive a barony, and he was raised to the peerage as Baron Knollys, of Caversham in the County of Oxford, on 15 July 1902. He took the oath and his seat in the House of Lords the following month, on 7 August. He became a Privy Councillor in 1910, and in 1911 he was further honoured when he was made Viscount Knollys, of Caversham in the County of Oxford.

- GCB: Knight Grand Cross of the Order of the Bath – 1908 (Knight Commander – KCB 1897; Companion – CB, 1876)
- GCVO: Knight Grand Cross of the Royal Victorian Order – 2 February 1901
- KCMG : Knight Commander of the Most Distinguished Order of St Michael and St George – 1886
- ISO: Imperial Service Order – 1903

Court offices
| Preceded by Sir Arthur Bigge | Private Secretary to the Sovereign; 1901 – 1913 | Succeeded by Sir Arthur Bigge |
Peerage of the United Kingdom
| New creation | Viscount Knollys; 1911 – 1924 | Succeeded by Edward Knollys |
| New creation | Baron Knollys; 1902 – 1924 | Succeeded by Edward Knollys |
