= Knollys family =

English aristocratic family

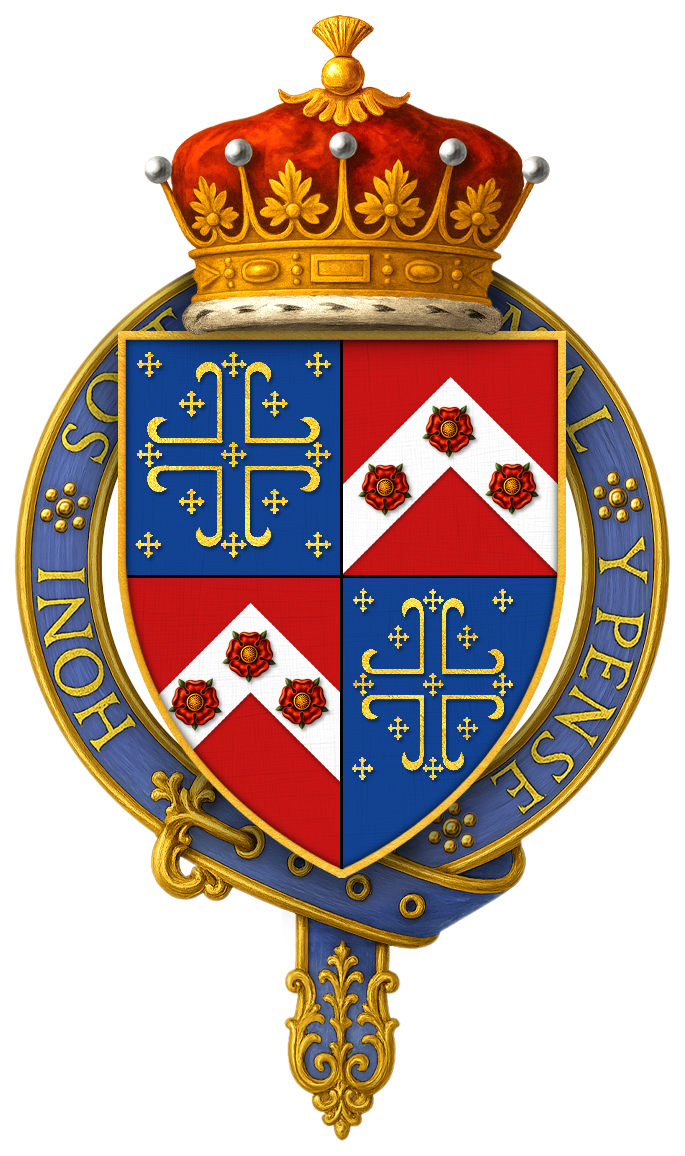
Coat of arms of William Knollys, 1st Earl of Banbury

The Knollys family, Knolles or Knowles (/noʊlz/), is an English noble family descended from Sir Thomas Knollys (died 1435), Lord Mayor of London, possibly a kinsman of the celebrated general Sir Robert Knolles. The next distinguished member of the family was Sir Francis Knollys or Knowles (c. 1514–1596), English statesman, son of Sir Robert Knollys, or Knolles (died 1521), a courtier in the service and favour of Henry VII and Henry VIII. Robert had also a younger son, Sir Henry, who took part in public life during the reign of Elizabeth I and who died in 1583. Lettice Knollys was considered the most prominent member of the family, from her birth in 1543 until her death in 1634.

From the time of Sir Francis, the family were associated with Greys Court at Rotherfield Greys and Caversham Park, then in Oxfordshire, as well as the nearby town of Reading in Berkshire. The family's private chapel could once be seen in St Laurence's Church in Reading, and Great Knollys Street in the town is named after them.

== Sir Francis Knollys (c.1514–1596) ==
Francis Knollys, who entered the service of Henry VIII before 1540, became a member of parliament in 1542 and was knighted in 1547 while serving with the English army in Scotland. He became custodian of Wallingford Castle in 1551. A strong and somewhat aggressive supporter of the reformed doctrines, he retired to Germany soon after Mary became queen, returning to England to become a privy councillor, vice-Chamberlain of the royal household and a member of parliament under Queen Elizabeth, whose cousin Catherine Carey (died 1568), daughter of William Carey and niece of Anne Boleyn, was his wife. After serving as governor of Plymouth, Knollys was sent in 1566 to Ireland, his mission being to obtain for the queen confidential reports about the conduct of the lord-deputy Sir Henry Sidney.

Approving of Sidney's actions, he came back to England, and in 1568 was sent to Carlisle to take charge of Mary, Queen of Scots, who had just fled from Scotland; afterwards he was in charge of the queen at Bolton Castle and then at Tutbury Castle. He discussed religious questions with his prisoner, although the extreme Protestant views which he put before her did not meet with Elizabeth's approval, and he gave up the position of guardian just after his wife's death in January 1569. In 1584 he introduced into the House of Commons, where since 1572 he had represented Oxfordshire, the bill legalising the national association for Elizabeth's defence, and he was treasurer of the royal household from 1572 until his death on 19 July 1596.

His monument may still be seen in the church of Rotherfield Greys. Knollys was repeatedly free and frank in his objections to Elizabeth's tortuous foreign policy; but, possibly owing to his relationship to the queen, he did not lose her favour and he was one of her commissioners on such important occasions as the trials of Mary Queen of Scots, of Philip Howard, earl of Arundel, and of Anthony Babington. An active and lifelong Puritan, his attacks on the bishops were not lacking in vigour and he was also very hostile to heretics. He received many grants of land from the queen, and was chief steward of the city of Oxford and a Knight of the Garter.

It would seem that his son Sir Francis Knollys the Younger, in earlier years a pirate and soldier was Elizabeth's Vice-Chamberlain, who may be associated with The Lord Chamberlain's Men – Shakespeare's company – through Carey family connections to Sir Francis the Elder. In either case, Franklin's or Francolin's – an anagram of Francis Knollys – substitutes for Chamberlain's as a pun in the company's title.

== Children of Sir Francis Knollys the Elder ==
Sir Francis's sons Sir Henry (died 1583), Sir Edward (died 1580), Sir Robert (died 1625), Sir Richard (died 1596), Sir Francis (died 1648) and Sir Thomas, were all courtiers and served the queen in parliament or in the field. Richard's family continued to live at Rotherfield Greys, while Francis Junior's descendants held Battle Manor in Reading. The latter's daughter, Lettice (died 1666), was the second wife of the parliamentarian, John Hampden. Francis Senior's daughter, Lettice (1540–1634), married Walter Devereux, 1st Earl of Essex and then Robert Dudley, 1st Earl of Leicester. She was the mother of Elizabeth's favourite, Robert Devereux, 2nd Earl of Essex.

Sir Francis Knollys's second son William (c. 1547–1632) served as a member of parliament and a soldier during the reign of Queen Elizabeth and was knighted in 1586. William inherited his father's estates in Oxfordshire (his eldest brother Henry having died without sons in 1583) and became in 1596 a privy councillor and comptroller, and subsequently treasurer, of the royal household. Sir William enjoyed the favour of the new king, James I, whom he had visited in Scotland in 1585, and was made Baron Knollys in 1603 and Viscount Wallingford in 1616. But in this latter year his fortunes suffered a temporary reverse. Through his second wife Elizabeth Howard (1586–1658), daughter of Thomas Howard, 1st Earl of Suffolk, William was related to Frances, Countess of Somerset, and when this lady was tried for the murder of Sir Thomas Overbury her relatives were regarded with suspicion; consequently Lord Wallingford resigned the treasurership of the household and two years later the mastership of the Court of Wards, an office which he had held since 1614. However, he regained the royal favour, and was created earl of Banbury in 1626. He died in London on 25 May 1632.

Some of Sir Francis Knollys's letters are in T. Wright's Queen Elizabeth and Her Times (1838) and the Burghley Papers, edited by S. Haynes (1740); and a few of his manuscripts are still in existence. A speech which Knollys delivered in parliament against some claims made by the bishops was printed in 1608 and again in W. Stoughton's Assertion for True and Christian Church Policie (London, 1642).

== Earls of Banbury ==
The Earl of Banbury's wife, Elizabeth Howard, who was nearly forty years her husband's junior, was the mother of two sons, Edward (1627–1645) and Nicholas (1631–1674), whose paternity has given rise to much dispute. Neither is mentioned in the earl's will, but in 1641 the law courts decided that Edward was Earl of Banbury, and when he was killed in June 1645 his brother Nicholas took the title. In the Convention Parliament of 1660 some objection was taken to the earl sitting in the House of Lords, and in 1661 he was not summoned to parliament; he had not succeeded in obtaining his writ of summons when he died on 14 March 1674.

Nicholas's son Charles (1662–1740), the 4th earl, had not been summoned to parliament when in 1692 he killed his brother-in-law, Captain Philip Lawson, in a duel. This raised the question of his rank in a new form. Was he, or was he not, entitled to trial by the peers? The House of Lords declared that he was not a peer and therefore not so entitled, but the Court of King's Bench released him from his imprisonment on the ground that he was the Earl of Banbury and not Charles Knowles, a commoner. Nevertheless, the House of Lords refused to move from its position, and Knowles had not received a writ of summons when he died in April 1740. He seems to have been the classic Restoration rake, dissolute and riotous. He dissipated an estate of £20,000 a year and appears to have had so loose a grasp of the concept of marriage that the word bigamous did not even begin to describe his conjugal exploits. He was legitimately married twice and left children, all of whom were baptised Knowles, and whose descendants are alive today. His son Charles (1703–1771), vicar of Burford, Oxfordshire, and his grandsons, Sir William (1726–1776) and Sir Thomas Woods (1727–1793), were successively titular Earls of Banbury, but they took no steps to prove their title. His natural son Admiral Sir Charles Knowles Bt ( 1704–1777) rose to become Rear Admiral of Great Britain and was created a baronet in 1765 of Lovell Hill, and from whom descends the present holder of the baronetcy. The Naval Chronicle of 1799 stated that "…he was the natural son of an earl of Bambury….and a French gentlewoman of rank and uncommon beauty, whom he seduced: circumstances made her case to be pitied and she was much noted by Lord and Lady Wallingford."

However, in 1806, Sir Thomas Woods's son Sir William (1763–1834), who attained the rank of general in the British army, asked for a writ of summons as Earl of Banbury, but in 1813 the House of Lords decided against the claim. Several peers, including the great Lord Erskine, protested against this decision, but General Knollys himself accepted it and ceased to call himself Earl of Banbury. He died in Paris on 20 March 1834. His eldest son, Sir William Thomas Knollys (1797–1883), entered the army and served with the Guards during the Peninsular War. Remaining in the army after the conclusion of the peace of 1815 he won a good reputation and rose high in his profession. He lived at Blount's Court at Rotherfield Peppard in Oxfordshire. From 1855 to 1860 he was in charge of the military camp at Aldershot, then in its infancy, and in 1861 he was made president of the council of military education. From 1862 to 1877 he was comptroller of the household of the Prince of Wales, afterwards King Edward VII. From 1877 until his death on 23 June 1883, he was Gentleman Usher of the Black Rod; he was also a privy councillor and colonel of the Scots Guards. Of his children, one son Francis Knollys, 1st Viscount Knollys (born 1837), was private secretary to Edward VII and George V (created Baron Knollys in 1902 and Viscount Knollys in 1911); another son, Sir Henry Knollys (1840–1930), became private secretary to King Edward's daughter Maud, Queen of Norway; and daughter, Charlotte, became the Private Secretary and close friend to the Princess of Wales, later Queen Alexandra and died unmarried in 1930.

== See also ==
- Knowles Baronets
