= Knowles baronets =

Set index for Knowles baronets

There have been two baronetcies created for the Knowles family, originally a branch of the Knollys family known as Knollys of Stanford. One is in the Baronetage of Great Britain, which is extant, and one was in the Baronetage of the United Kingdom, and is extinct.

- Knowles baronets of Lovell Hill (1765)
- Knowles baronets of Westwood and Turton Tower (1903): see Sir Lees Knowles, 1st Baronet (1857–1928)
