= Noel (surname) =

Noel or Noël is the surname of the following:

- Bill Noël (1914–1987), American oil industrialist and philanthropist from Texas
- Brandon Noel, American basketball player
- Cecilia Noël (fl. 1990s–2020s), Peruvian-born Latin music artist
- Christian Noël (born 1945), French fencer
- Claude Noël (born 1955), Canadian hockey player and coach
- David Noel (born 1984), American basketball player
- Don Noel (born 1929), American racing driver
- Edmond Noel (1856–1927), American politician from Mississippi
- Edward Noel (Indian Army officer) (1886–1974), British soldier and spy
- Ellen Kyle Noel (1815–1873), Irish Canadian novelist
- Evan Noel (1879–1928), British rackets player
- Fabrice Noël (born 1985), Haitian football player
- Fania Noël, Franco-Haitian author and activist
- Gladys Noel Bates (née Gladys Winnie Noel; 1920–2010) American civil rights pioneer, teacher
- Gerard Noel (disambiguation), several people
- Iván Noel (1968–2021), Argentine producer and director
- Jaylin Noel (born 2002), American football player
- Jhonkensy Noel (born 2001), Dominican baseball player
- Jimmy Noel (1903–1985), American actor and stuntman
- John Noel (disambiguation), several people
- Jules Achille Noël (1815–1881), French landscape and maritime painter
- Magali Noël (1931–2015), Turkish-French actress and singer
- Nerlens Noel (born 1994), American basketball player
- Nate Noel (born 2002), American football player
- Paul Noel (1924–2005), American basketball player
- Philip Noel (born 1931), American politician
- Rico Noel (born 1989), American baseball player
- Roden Noel (1834–1894), English poet
- Sofía Noel, adopted name of the Belgian-born Spanish soprano Sophie Heyman (1915–2011)
- Suzanne Noël (1878-1954), French plastic surgeon, world's first female plastic surgeon
- Tom Cecil Noel (1897–1918), British infantry officer turned aerial observer

== Fictional ==
- Tessa Noël, character in the television series Highlander: The Series

== See also ==
- Nowell (surname)
- Noll, surname
- Knoll (surname)
- Knowle (disambiguation), includes list of people with surname Knowle
