= El Portal, Florida =

- Village
- Village of El Portal
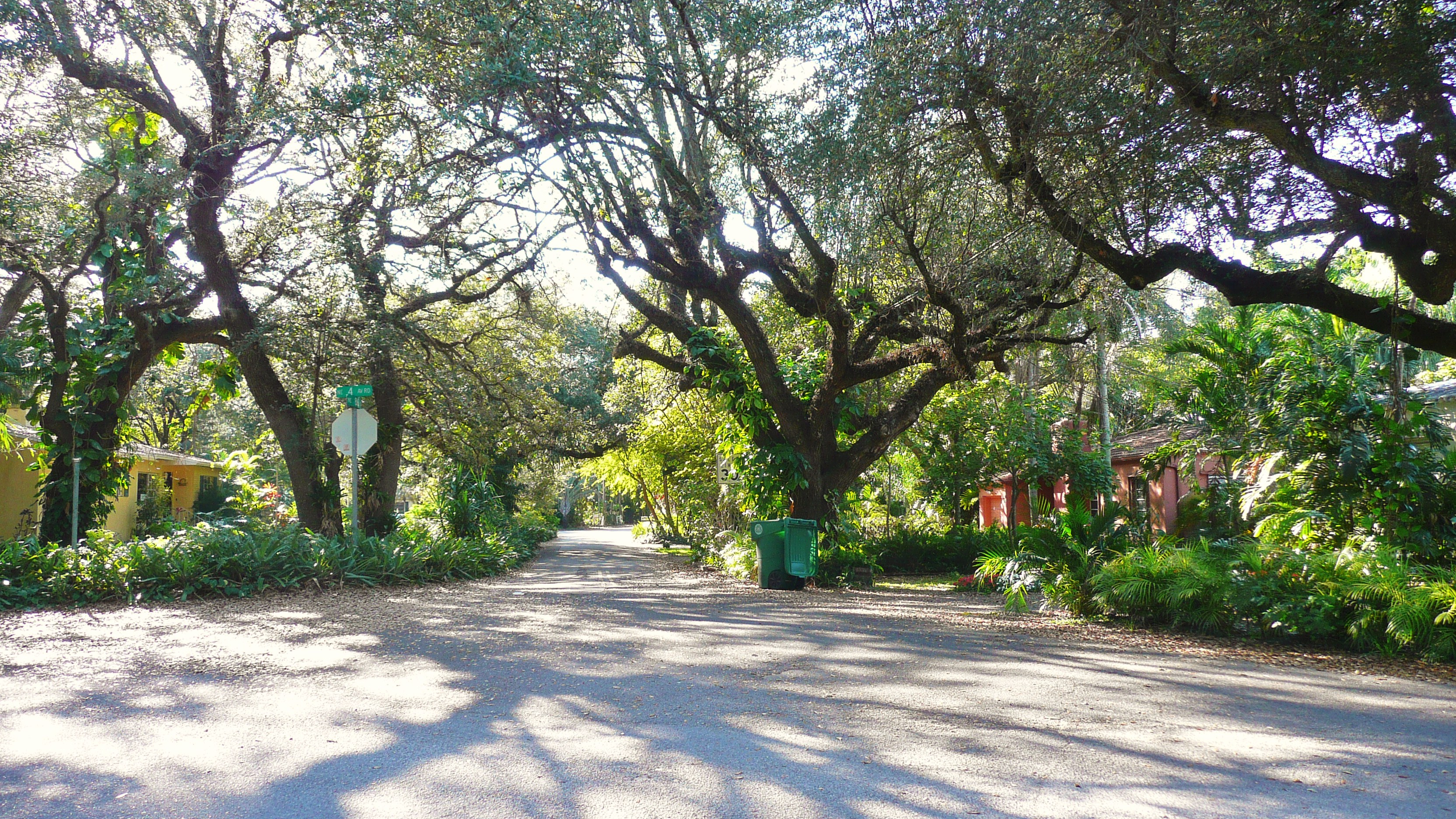
- Typical street in El Portal

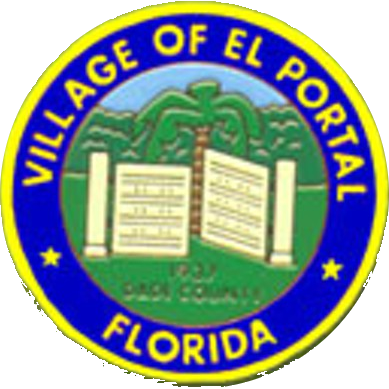
- Seal

- Location in Miami-Dade County and the state of Florida

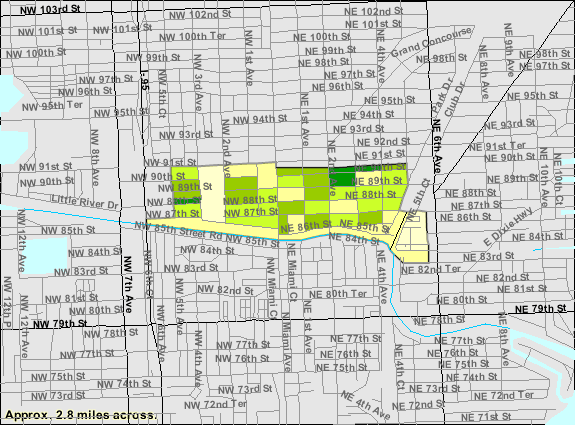
- U.S. Census Bureau map showing village boundaries
- Coordinates: 25°51′20″N 80°11′43″W
- Country: United States
- State: Florida
- County: Miami-Dade
- Settled: c. 200 AD
- Resettled: 1843
- Miami neighborhood: 1925–1932
- Unincorporated: 1932
- Incorporated: December 6, 1937

Government
  - Type: Council–Manager
  - Mayor: Omarr C. Nickerson
  - Vice Mayor: Darian Martin
  - Councilpersons: Dr. Anna E. Lightfoot-Ward, Charles Winters, and Anders Urbom
  - Village Manager: David A. Rosemond
  - Village Clerk: Yenise Jacobi

Area
  - Total: 0.42 sq mi (1.09 km^{2})
  - Land: 0.42 sq mi (1.08 km^{2})
  - Water: 0.0039 sq mi (0.01 km^{2})
- Elevation: 10 ft (3.0 m)

Population (2020)
  - Total: 1,986
  - Density: 4,776.8/sq mi (1,844.35/km^{2})
- Time zone: UTC-5 (EST)
  - Summer (DST): UTC-4 (EDT)
- ZIP Codes: 33138, 33150
- Area codes: 305, 786, 645
- FIPS code: 12-20650
- GNIS feature ID: 2407449
- Website: www.elportalvillage.com

El Portal is a village in Miami-Dade County, Florida, United States. The name is derived from the Spanish term for "the gate", after two wooden gates that once stood as a gateway to the village. It's part of the Miami metropolitan area of South Florida. As of the 2020 census, the population of El Portal was 1,986, down from 2,325 in 2010.

== History ==
The Village of El Portal is a small, diverse enclave between Miami Shores and Miami. The enclave was originally the capital of the Tequesta tribal area, and was visited by Pedro Menéndez de Avilés in the 1560s.

Nearly three centuries later, in 1848, the community was resettled by settlers, and was eventually annexed into the city of Miami, briefly becoming a neighborhood of Miami from 1925 to 1932. Because of the financial damage done during the Great Depression and the 1926 Miami hurricane, in 1932, Miami decided to disincorporate its jurisdiction over El Portal to cut the city's expenses, and instead, it was officially incorporated as a separate municipality of its own on December 6, 1937.

Three small subdivisions (now neighborhoods)—Sherwood Forest, El Jardin (Spanish for "The Garden"), and El Portal—merged into the Village of El Portal. Its borders include 91st Street on the north, the Little River Canal on the south, Northeast Fifth Avenue on the east and Northwest Fifth Avenue on the west.

The village's name is a Spanish term meaning "the gate," referring to two huge wooden gates on Northeast Second Avenue that were taken down in the 1940s.

The village has been designated as a bird sanctuary by the State of Florida since the 1950s, which means that the birds and trees cannot be harmed in any way. A nature trail winds its way through the village. El Portal also boasts links to prehistoric Native American life at the Little River Mound, a four-foot-high, man-made structure that looks like a grassy knoll, but is actually an ancient burial ground dating back to 600 AD, while the precolonial Native American village itself dates back to 200 AD. The Little River Mound, located in the Sherwood Forest neighborhood, was the first archaeological site to be publicly recognized and preserved in Miami-Dade County.

== Geography ==
El Portal is located 6 miles (10 km) north of downtown Miami. It is bordered to the south and east by the city of Miami, to the north by the village of Miami Shores, and to the southwest by unincorporated West Little River.

According to the United States Census Bureau, the village has a total area of 0.4 square miles (1.0 km^{2}), of which 0.005 square miles (1.3 ha), or 1.19%, are water.

=== Surrounding areas ===
Miami Shores
Unincorporated Miami-Dade County Miami Shores
Unincorporated Miami-Dade County, Pinewood Miami Shores, Miami
West Little River Miami
West Little River, Miami

=== Climate ===
The Village of El Portal has a tropical climate, similar to the climate found in much of the Caribbean. It is part of the only region in the 48 contiguous states that falls under that category. More specifically, it generally has a tropical savanna climate (Köppen climate classification: Aw), bordering a tropical monsoon climate (Köppen climate classification: Am).

== Demographics ==
Historical population
Census	Pop.	Note	%±
1940	365		—
1950	1,371		275.6%
1960	2,079		51.6%
1970	2,068		−0.5%
1980	2,055		−0.6%
1990	2,457		19.6%
2000	2,505		2.0%
2010	2,325		−7.2%
2020	1,986		−14.6%
U.S. Decennial Census

=== Racial and ethnic composition ===
El Portal village, Florida – Racial and ethnic composition Note: the US Census treats Hispanic/Latino as an ethnic category. This table excludes Latinos from the racial categories and assigns them to a separate category. Hispanics/Latinos may be of any race.
Race / Ethnicity (NH = Non-Hispanic)	Pop 2000	Pop 2010	Pop 2020	% 2000	% 2010	% 2020
White alone (NH)	399	441	480	15.93%	18.97%	24.17%
Black or African American alone (NH)	1,482	1,106	684	59.16%	47.57%	34.44%
Native American or Alaska Native alone (NH)	1	3	4	0.04%	0.13%	0.20%
Asian alone (NH)	20	28	43	0.80%	1.20%	2.17%
Native Hawaiian or Pacific Islander alone (NH)	0	1	3	0.00%	0.04%	0.15%
Other race alone (NH)	5	23	23	0.20%	0.99%	1.16%
Mixed race or Multiracial (NH)	116	58	73	4.63%	2.49%	3.68%
Hispanic or Latino (any race)	482	665	676	19.24%	28.60%	34.04%
Total	2,505	2,325	1,986	100.00%	100.00%	100.00%

=== 2020 census ===
As of the 2020 census, El Portal had a population of 1,986. The median age was 42.6 years. 18.3% of residents were under the age of 18 and 16.3% of residents were 65 years of age or older. For every 100 females there were 98.4 males, and for every 100 females age 18 and over there were 96.6 males age 18 and over.

100.0% of residents lived in urban areas, while 0.0% lived in rural areas.

There were 771 households in El Portal, of which 35.7% had children under the age of 18 living in them. Of all households, 43.8% were married-couple households, 19.1% were households with a male householder and no spouse or partner present, and 29.3% were households with a female householder and no spouse or partner present. About 21.6% of all households were made up of individuals and 8.0% had someone living alone who was 65 years of age or older.

There were 847 housing units, of which 9.0% were vacant. The homeowner vacancy rate was 1.3% and the rental vacancy rate was 6.9%.

In the 2020 American Community Survey 5-year estimates, there were 451 families residing in the village.

=== 2010 census ===
As of the 2010 United States census, there were 2,325 people, 836 households, and 581 families residing in the village.

=== 2000 census ===
In 2000, 33.8% had children under the age of 18 living with them, 39.2% were married couples living together, 21.7% had a female householder with no husband present, and 32.5% were non-families. 24.7% of all households were made up of individuals, and 6.2% had someone living alone who was 65 years of age or older. The average household size was 2.98 and the average family size was 3.59.

In 2000, the village population was spread out, with 25.4% under the age of 18, 9.3% from 18 to 24, 30.6% from 25 to 44, 24.4% from 45 to 64, and 10.4% who were 65 years of age or older. The median age was 36 years. For every 100 females, there were 97.1 males. For every 100 females age 18 and over, there were 96.7 males.

In 2000, the median income for a household in the village was $39,681, and the median income for a family was $41,029. Males had a median income of $27,222 versus $22,409 for females. The per capita income for the village was $14,782. About 16.3% of families and 22.2% of the population were below the poverty line, including 28.9% of those under age 18 and 9.3% of those age 65 or over.

As of 2000, speakers of English was spoken as a first language by 51.96% of residents, while speakers of French Creole made up 23.72% of the populace, Spanish at 22.38%, French 1.08%, and Jamaican Patois was the mother tongue for 0.86% of the population.

== Religion ==
As of 2017, 38.34% of residents were religious. Catholicism was the most practiced faith group in El Portal at 24.60%, followed by 4.55% who practiced Judaism, 3.48% who were Baptists, 2.45% nondenominational Christians, 1.00% Pentecostal worshipers, and 0.56% of villagers who were practicing Methodists. The rest of El Portal's 38.34% religious groups were under half a percent.

The Rader Methodist church was built in the 1920s, and was considered the oldest church in El Portal. In early 2016, two developers have plans to convert the church into mixed-used space to offer tenants affordable rent.

== Gallery ==
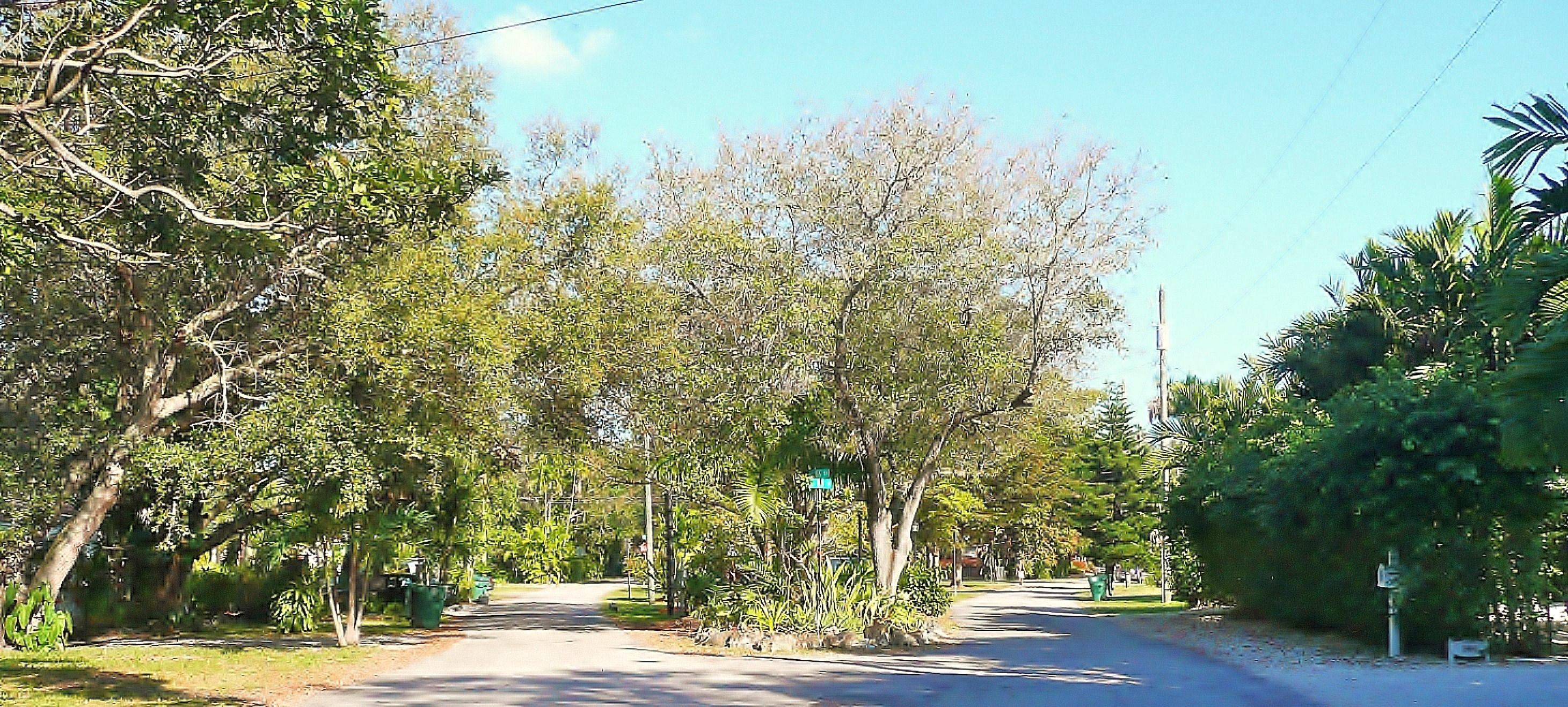
Typical street in El Portal

== See also ==
- History of Florida
- Pedro Menéndez de Avilés
