= List of United Kingdom locations: Kip-Kz =

The United Kingdom

This is part of the list of United Kingdom locations: a gazetteer of place names in the United Kingdom showing each place's locality and geographical coordinates.

== Ki (continued) ==
=== Kip–Kiz ===
Location	Locality	Coordinates (links to map & photo sources)	OS grid reference
Kip Hill	Durham	54.87°N 01.68°W	NZ2053
Kiplin	North Yorkshire	54.36°N 01.58°W	SE2797
Kiplingcotes	East Riding of Yorkshire	53.90°N 00.60°W	SE9245
Kippax	Leeds	53.76°N 01.37°W	SE4130
Kippen	Stirling	56.12°N 04.17°W	NS6594
Kippford	Dumfries and Galloway	54.86°N 03.82°W	NX8354
Kippilaw	Scottish Borders	55.54°N 02.73°W	NT5428
Kippilaw Mains	Scottish Borders	55.55°N 02.73°W	NT5429
Kipping's Cross	Kent	51.12°N 00.34°E	TQ6439
Kippington	Kent	51.26°N 00.17°E	TQ5254
Kirbister (near Kirkwall)	Orkney Islands	58.94°N 03.11°W	HY3607
Kirbister (near Stromness)	Orkney Islands	59.00°N 03.32°W	HY2414
Kirbuster	Orkney Islands	59.10°N 03.25°W	HY2825
Kirby	Isle of Man	54.15°N 04.51°W	SC3676
Kirby Bedon	Norfolk	52.59°N 01.36°E	TG2805
Kirby Bellars	Leicestershire	52.74°N 00.94°W	SK7117
Kirby Cane	Norfolk	52.48°N 01.48°E	TM3793
Kirby Corner	Warwickshire	52.38°N 01.57°W	SP2976
Kirby Cross	Essex	51.83°N 01.22°E	TM2220
Kirby Fields	Leicestershire	52.62°N 01.23°W	SK5203
Kirby Green	Norfolk	52.49°N 01.49°E	TM3794
Kirby Grindalythe	North Yorkshire	54.09°N 00.62°W	SE9067
Kirby Hill (Richmondshire)	North Yorkshire	54.44°N 01.80°W	NZ1306
Kirby Hill (Harrogate)	North Yorkshire	54.06°N 01.40°W	SE3868
Kirby Knowle	North Yorkshire	54.27°N 01.29°W	SE4687
Kirby-le-Soken	Essex	51.84°N 01.22°E	TM2221
Kirby Misperton	North Yorkshire	54.20°N 00.82°W	SE7779
Kirby Muxloe	Leicestershire	52.63°N 01.24°W	SK5104
Kirby Row	Norfolk	52.47°N 01.48°E	TM3792
Kirby Sigston	North Yorkshire	54.34°N 01.37°W	SE4194
Kirby Underdale	East Riding of Yorkshire	54.01°N 00.78°W	SE8058
Kirby Wiske	North Yorkshire	54.25°N 01.43°W	SE3784
Kirdford	West Sussex	51.02°N 00.56°W	TQ0126
Kirkabister (Bressay)	Shetland Islands	60.125°N 01.117°W	HU4938
Kirkabister (near Neap)	Shetland Islands	60.30°N 01.11°W	HU4958
Kirkabister (near Vidlin Voe)	Shetland Islands	60.37°N 01.13°W	HU4866
Kirkandrews	Dumfries and Galloway	54.80°N 04.19°W	NX5948
Kirkandrews-on-Eden	Cumbria	54.91°N 03.01°W	NY3558
Kirkapol	Argyll and Bute	56.52°N 06.81°W	NM0447
Kirkaton	Shetland Islands	60.80°N 00.80°W	HP6514
Kirkbampton	Cumbria	54.89°N 03.09°W	NY3056
Kirkbean	Dumfries and Galloway	54.91°N 03.60°W	NX9759
Kirkborough	Cumbria	54.71°N 03.47°W	NY0536
Kirk Bramwith	Doncaster	53.59°N 01.07°W	SE6111
Kirkbride	Cumbria	54.89°N 03.21°W	NY2256
Kirkbridge	North Yorkshire	54.30°N 01.61°W	SE2590
Kirkburn	East Riding of Yorkshire	53.98°N 00.50°W	SE9855
Kirkburn	Scottish Borders	55.63°N 03.12°W	NT2938
Kirkburton	Kirklees	53.60°N 01.71°W	SE1912
Kirkby	North Yorkshire	54.44°N 01.18°W	NZ5306
Kirkby	Knowsley	53.47°N 02.89°W	SJ4198
Kirkby	Lincolnshire	53.41°N 00.40°W	TF0692
Kirkby Fenside	Lincolnshire	53.13°N 00.02°W	TF3261
Kirkby Fleetham	North Yorkshire	54.34°N 01.57°W	SE2894
Kirkby Green	Lincolnshire	53.09°N 00.38°W	TF0857
Kirkby-in-Ashfield	Nottinghamshire	53.09°N 01.25°W	SK5056
Kirkby-in-Furness	Cumbria	54.22°N 03.19°W	SD2282
Kirkby la Thorpe	Lincolnshire	52.99°N 00.37°W	TF0945
Kirkby Lonsdale	Cumbria	54.19°N 02.59°W	SD6178
Kirkby Malham	North Yorkshire	54.04°N 02.16°W	SD8961
Kirkby Mallory	Leicestershire	52.59°N 01.33°W	SK4500
Kirkby Malzeard	North Yorkshire	54.16°N 01.64°W	SE2374
Kirkby Mills	North Yorkshire	54.25°N 00.92°W	SE7085
Kirkbymoorside	North Yorkshire	54.26°N 00.94°W	SE6986
Kirkby on Bain	Lincolnshire	53.14°N 00.14°W	TF2462
Kirkby Overblow	North Yorkshire	53.93°N 01.51°W	SE3249
Kirkby Stephen	Cumbria	54.46°N 02.35°W	NY7708
Kirkby Thore	Cumbria	54.61°N 02.57°W	NY6325
Kirkby Underwood	Lincolnshire	52.83°N 00.41°W	TF0727
Kirkby Wharfe	North Yorkshire	53.85°N 01.24°W	SE5040
Kirkby Woodhouse	Nottinghamshire	53.08°N 01.26°W	SK4954
Kirkcaldy	Fife	56.10°N 03.17°W	NT2791
Kirkcambeck	Cumbria	55.00°N 02.73°W	NY5368
Kirkcolm	Dumfries and Galloway	54.96°N 05.09°W	NX0268
Kirkconnel	Dumfries and Galloway	55.38°N 04.00°W	NS7312
Kirkcowan	Dumfries and Galloway	54.91°N 04.62°W	NX3261
Kirkcudbright	Dumfries and Galloway	54.82°N 04.05°W	NX6850
Kirkdale	Liverpool	53.43°N 02.99°W	SJ3493
Kirk Deighton	North Yorkshire	53.94°N 01.40°W	SE3950
Kirk Ella	East Riding of Yorkshire	53.74°N 00.45°W	TA0229
Kirkfieldbank	South Lanarkshire	55.66°N 03.81°W	NS8643
Kirkforthar Feus	Fife	56.22°N 03.16°W	NO2804
Kirkgunzeon	Dumfries and Galloway	54.97°N 03.78°W	NX8666
Kirk Hallam	Derbyshire	52.95°N 01.33°W	SK4540
Kirkham	North Yorkshire	54.07°N 00.88°W	SE7365
Kirkham	Lancashire	53.78°N 02.88°W	SD4232
Kirkhamgate	Wakefield	53.69°N 01.56°W	SE2922
Kirk Hammerton	North Yorkshire	53.98°N 01.29°W	SE4655
Kirkhams	Bury	53.54°N 02.28°W	SD8105
Kirkharle	Northumberland	55.13°N 01.98°W	NZ0182
Kirkheaton	Northumberland	55.08°N 01.98°W	NZ0177
Kirkheaton	Kirklees	53.65°N 01.72°W	SE1818
Kirkhill	Highland	57.47°N 04.41°W	NH5545
Kirkhill	Angus	56.73°N 02.52°W	NO6860
Kirkhill (Penicuik)	Midlothian	55.82°N 03.23°W	NT2360
Kirkhill (Broxburn)	West Lothian	55.93°N 03.49°W	NT0772
Kirkhill (Newton Mearns)	East Renfrewshire	55.76°N 04.31°W	NS5555
Kirkholt	Rochdale	53.59°N 02.16°W	SD8911
Kirkhope	Scottish Borders	55.49°N 02.98°W	NT3823
Kirkhouse	Cumbria	54.92°N 02.68°W	NY5659
Kirkibost	Highland	57.17°N 06.07°W	NG5417
Kirkibost Island	Western Isles	57.55°N 07.42°W	NF757647
Kirkinner	Dumfries and Galloway	54.82°N 04.46°W	NX4251
Kirkintilloch	East Dunbartonshire	55.93°N 04.16°W	NS6573
Kirk Ireton	Derbyshire	53.04°N 01.61°W	SK2650
Kirkland (Copeland)	Cumbria	54.54°N 03.43°W	NY0717
Kirkland (Eden)	Cumbria	54.68°N 02.55°W	NY6432
Kirkland (Allerdale)	Cumbria	54.82°N 03.15°W	NY2648
Kirkland	Dumfries and Galloway	55.19°N 03.88°W	NX8090
Kirkland	Fife	56.18°N 03.03°W	NO3600
Kirkland Dam	Fife	56.18°N 03.04°W	NO3500
Kirkland Guards	Cumbria	54.74°N 03.27°W	NY1840
Kirk Langley	Derbyshire	52.93°N 01.58°W	SK2838
Kirkleatham	Redcar and Cleveland	54.58°N 01.08°W	NZ5921
Kirklees	Bury	53.60°N 02.33°W	SD7812
Kirklevington	Stockton-on-Tees	54.47°N 01.35°W	NZ4209
Kirkley	Suffolk	52.45°N 01.72°E	TM5391
Kirklington	North Yorkshire	54.22°N 01.52°W	SE3181
Kirklington	Nottinghamshire	53.10°N 01.00°W	SK6757
Kirklinton	Cumbria	54.99°N 02.89°W	NY4367
Kirkliston	City of Edinburgh	55.95°N 03.41°W	NT1274
Kirkmaiden	Dumfries and Galloway	54.68°N 04.91°W	NX1236
Kirk Merrington	Durham	54.67°N 01.59°W	NZ2631
Kirkmichael	Perth and Kinross	56.72°N 03.50°W	NO0860
Kirkmichael	South Ayrshire	55.33°N 04.61°W	NS3408
Kirk Michael	Isle of Man	54.27°N 04.59°W	SC3190
Kirkmichael Mains	Dumfries and Galloway	55.16°N 03.55°W	NY0187
Kirkmuirhill	South Lanarkshire	55.66°N 03.92°W	NS7943
Kirknewton	Northumberland	55.56°N 02.14°W	NT9130
Kirknewton	West Lothian	55.88°N 03.42°W	NT1167
Kirkney	Aberdeenshire	57.37°N 02.81°W	NJ5132
Kirk of Shotts	North Lanarkshire	55.83°N 03.85°W	NS8462
Kirkoswald	South Ayrshire	55.32°N 04.77°W	NS2407
Kirkoswald	Cumbria	54.76°N 02.70°W	NY5541
Kirkpatrick	Dumfries and Galloway	55.19°N 03.72°W	NX9090
Kirkpatrick Durham	Dumfries and Galloway	55.01°N 03.90°W	NX7870
Kirkpatrick-Fleming	Dumfries and Galloway	55.01°N 03.14°W	NY2770
Kirk Sandall	Doncaster	53.55°N 01.08°W	SE6107
Kirksanton	Cumbria	54.20°N 03.33°W	SD1380
Kirkshaws	North Lanarkshire	55.84°N 04.04°W	NS7263
Kirk Smeaton	North Yorkshire	53.63°N 01.23°W	SE5116
Kirkstall	Leeds	53.81°N 01.60°W	SE2635
Kirkstead	Scottish Borders	55.50°N 03.17°W	NT2624
Kirkstyle	Highland	58.63°N 03.13°W	ND3472
Kirkthorpe	Wakefield	53.67°N 01.45°W	SE3620
Kirkton	Aberdeenshire	57.31°N 02.59°W	NJ6425
Kirkton (Tealing, near Dundee)	Angus	56.52°N 02.97°W	NO4037
Kirkton (Arbroath)	Angus	56.56°N 02.60°W	NO6342
Kirkton (Forfar)	Angus	56.60°N 02.94°W	NO4246
Kirkton	Dumfries and Galloway	55.11°N 03.61°W	NX9781
Kirkton (Newport-on-Tay)	Fife	56.41°N 03.03°W	NO3625
Kirkton (Burntisland)	Fife	56.06°N 03.23°W	NT2386
Kirkton (Golspie)	Highland	57.95°N 04.04°W	NH7998
Kirkton (Strathcarron)	Highland	57.41°N 05.48°W	NG9141
Kirkton (Kyle)	Highland	57.28°N 05.60°W	NG8327
Kirkton	Scottish Borders	55.40°N 02.72°W	NT5413
Kirkton	Stirling	56.16°N 04.40°W	NN5100
Kirkton	West Lothian	55.87°N 03.55°W	NT0366
Kirktonhill	Renfrewshire	55.93°N 04.59°W	NS3874
Kirkton of Auchterhouse	Angus	56.53°N 03.07°W	NO3438
Kirkton of Auchterless	Aberdeenshire	57.45°N 02.48°W	NJ7141
Kirkton of Craig	Angus	56.68°N 02.49°W	NO7055
Kirkton of Culsalmond	Aberdeenshire	57.37°N 02.60°W	NJ6432
Kirkton of Cults	Fife	56.26°N 03.06°W	NO3409
Kirkton of Durris	Aberdeenshire	57.05°N 02.38°W	NO7796
Kirkton of Glenbuchat	Aberdeenshire	57.22°N 03.04°W	NJ3715
Kirkton of Glenisla	Angus	56.72°N 03.29°W	NO2160
Kirkton of Kingoldrum	Angus	56.67°N 03.09°W	NO3354
Kirkton of Largo (or Upper Largo)	Fife	56.21°N 02.93°W	NO4203
Kirkton of Lethendy	Perth and Kinross	56.56°N 03.41°W	NO1342
Kirkton of Lude	Perth and Kinross	56.79°N 03.80°W	NN9068
Kirkton of Maryculter	Aberdeenshire	57.08°N 02.24°W	NO8599
Kirkton of Menmuir	Angus	56.76°N 02.77°W	NO5364
Kirkton of Monikie	Angus	56.53°N 02.79°W	NO5138
Kirkton of Oyne	Aberdeenshire	57.31°N 02.53°W	NJ6825
Kirkton of Rayne	Aberdeenshire	57.36°N 02.51°W	NJ6930
Kirkton of Skene	Aberdeenshire	57.15°N 02.33°W	NJ8007
Kirkton of Tough	Aberdeenshire	57.20°N 02.64°W	NJ6113
Kirktoun	East Ayrshire	55.62°N 04.52°W	NS4140
Kirktown (Peterhead)	Aberdeenshire	57.50°N 01.80°W	NK1246
Kirktown of St Fergus (or Kirktown)	Aberdeenshire	57.54°N 01.85°W	NK0951
Kirktown of Alvah	Aberdeenshire	57.62°N 02.55°W	NJ6760
Kirktown of Deskford	Moray	57.63°N 02.83°W	NJ5061
Kirktown of Fetteresso	Aberdeenshire	56.95°N 02.24°W	NO8585
Kirktown of Mortlach	Moray	57.43°N 03.13°W	NJ3239
Kirkurd	Scottish Borders	55.68°N 03.40°W	NT1244
Kirkwall	Orkney Islands	58.97°N 02.95°W	HY4510
Kirkwhelpington	Northumberland	55.15°N 02.01°W	NY9984
Kirkwood	Dumfries and Galloway	55.06°N 03.37°W	NY1275
Kirkwood	North Lanarkshire	55.84°N 04.06°W	NS7163
Kirk Yetholm	Scottish Borders	55.54°N 02.28°W	NT8228
Kirmington	North Lincolnshire	53.58°N 00.33°W	TA1011
Kirmond le Mire	Lincolnshire	53.41°N 00.22°W	TF1892
Kirn	Argyll and Bute	55.95°N 04.91°W	NS1877
Kirriemuir	Angus	56.66°N 03.01°W	NO3853
Kirstead Green	Norfolk	52.52°N 01.37°E	TM2997
Kirtlebridge	Dumfries and Galloway	55.03°N 03.20°W	NY2372
Kirtleton	Dumfries and Galloway	55.10°N 03.16°W	NY2680
Kirtling	Cambridgeshire	52.17°N 00.45°E	TL6856
Kirtling Green	Cambridgeshire	52.16°N 00.45°E	TL6855
Kirtlington	Oxfordshire	51.86°N 01.28°W	SP4919
Kirtomy	Highland	58.53°N 04.16°W	NC7463
Kirton	Suffolk	52.00°N 01.30°E	TM2739
Kirton	Lincolnshire	52.92°N 00.06°W	TF3038
Kirton	Nottinghamshire	53.21°N 00.96°W	SK6969
Kirton Campus	West Lothian	55.87°N 03.55°W	NT0366
Kirton End	Lincolnshire	52.94°N 00.09°W	TF2840
Kirton Holme	Lincolnshire	52.95°N 00.12°W	TF2641
Kirton in Lindsey	North Lincolnshire	53.47°N 00.60°W	SK9398
Kiskin	Cumbria	54.26°N 03.39°W	SD0986
Kislingbury	Northamptonshire	52.22°N 00.99°W	SP6959
Kitbridge	Devon	50.82°N 02.99°W	ST3003
Kitchenroyd	Kirklees	53.57°N 01.65°W	SE2309
Kitebrook	Oxfordshire	51.97°N 01.65°W	SP2431
Kite Green	Warwickshire	52.29°N 01.76°W	SP1666
Kite Hill	Isle of Wight	50.72°N 01.22°W	SZ5592
Kites Hardwick	Warwickshire	52.30°N 01.31°W	SP4768
Kit Hill	Dorset	50.97°N 02.22°W	ST8419
Kitlye	Gloucestershire	51.73°N 02.16°W	SO8904
Kit's Coty	Kent	51.32°N 00.49°E	TQ7461
Kitt Green	Wigan	53.54°N 02.68°W	SD5505
Kittisford	Somerset	50.99°N 03.32°W	ST0722
Kittle	Swansea	51.58°N 04.06°W	SS5789
Kitt's End	Hertfordshire	51.66°N 00.20°W	TQ2498
Kitt's Green	Birmingham	52.48°N 01.78°W	SP1587
Kitt's Moss	Stockport	53.35°N 02.18°W	SJ8884
Kittwhistle	Dorset	50.82°N 02.86°W	ST3903
Kittybrewster	City of Aberdeen	57.15°N 02.13°W	NJ9207
Kitwood	Hampshire	51.09°N 01.05°W	SU6633
Kivernoll	Herefordshire	51.98°N 02.78°W	SO4632
Kiveton Park	Rotherham	53.34°N 01.26°W	SK4983

== Kn ==
Location	Locality	Coordinates (links to map & photo sources)	OS grid reference
Knaith	Lincolnshire	53.34°N 00.76°W	SK8284
Knaith Park	Lincolnshire	53.35°N 00.73°W	SK8485
Knaphill	Surrey	51.31°N 00.62°W	SU9658
Knapp	Hampshire	51.00°N 01.43°W	SU4023
Knapp	Perth and Kinross	56.46°N 03.17°W	NO2831
Knapp	Somerset	51.02°N 02.99°W	ST3025
Knapp	Wiltshire	51.02°N 01.97°W	SU0225
Knapp Hill	Dorset	51.04°N 02.21°W	ST8527
Knapthorpe	Nottinghamshire	53.11°N 00.89°W	SK7458
Knaptoft	Leicestershire	52.49°N 01.08°W	SP6289
Knapton	York	53.96°N 01.14°W	SE5652
Knapton	Norfolk	52.85°N 01.41°E	TG3034
Knapton Green	Herefordshire	52.16°N 02.82°W	SO4452
Knapwell	Cambridgeshire	52.24°N 00.05°W	TL3362
Knaresborough	North Yorkshire	54.00°N 01.46°W	SE3557
Knarsdale	Northumberland	54.87°N 02.51°W	NY6753
Knarston	Orkney Islands	59.06°N 03.22°W	HY3020
Knatts Valley	Kent	51.32°N 00.23°E	TQ5661
Knaven	Aberdeenshire	57.47°N 02.18°W	NJ8943
Knave's Ash	Kent	51.33°N 01.14°E	TR1964
Knaves Green	Suffolk	52.24°N 01.10°E	TM1265
Knavesmire	York	53.93°N 01.11°W	SE5849
Knayton	North Yorkshire	54.27°N 01.34°W	SE4387
Knebworth	Hertfordshire	51.86°N 00.18°W	TL2520
Knedlington	East Riding of Yorkshire	53.74°N 00.89°W	SE7328
Kneep	Western Isles	58.21°N 06.95°W	NB0936
Kneesall	Nottinghamshire	53.16°N 00.95°W	SK7064
Kneesworth	Cambridgeshire	52.07°N 00.04°W	TL3444
Kneeton	Nottinghamshire	53.00°N 00.94°W	SK7146
Knelston	Swansea	51.57°N 04.22°W	SS4688
Knenhall	Staffordshire	52.93°N 02.12°W	SJ9237
Knettishall	Suffolk	52.38°N 00.89°E	TL9780
Knightacott	Devon	51.13°N 03.94°W	SS6439
Knightcote	Warwickshire	52.18°N 01.43°W	SP3954
Knightcott	North Somerset	51.32°N 02.89°W	ST3859
Knightley	Staffordshire	52.82°N 02.28°W	SJ8125
Knightley Dale	Staffordshire	52.80°N 02.28°W	SJ8123
Knighton	Devon	50.33°N 04.07°W	SX5249
Knighton	Dorset	50.90°N 02.55°W	ST6111
Knighton	Poole, Dorset	50.78°N 01.93°W	SZ0497
Knighton	City of Leicester	52.60°N 01.13°W	SK5901
Knighton	Oxfordshire	51.58°N 01.59°W	SU2887
Knighton	Powys	52.34°N 03.05°W	SO2872
Knighton	Shropshire	52.95°N 02.41°W	SJ7240
Knighton	Somerset	51.19°N 03.16°W	ST1944
Knighton	Wiltshire	51.43°N 01.58°W	SU2971
Knighton	Worcestershire	52.21°N 01.94°W	SP0356
Knighton Fields	City of Leicester	52.60°N 01.13°W	SK5901
Knighton on Teme	Worcestershire	52.32°N 02.54°W	SO6370
Knightor	Cornwall	50.37°N 04.77°W	SX0356
Knightsbridge	Gloucestershire	51.93°N 02.16°W	SO8926
Knightsbridge	Royal Borough of Kensington and Chelsea	51.49°N 00.17°W	TQ2779
Knight's End	Cambridgeshire	52.52°N 00.06°E	TL4094
Knight's Enham	Hampshire	51.23°N 01.48°W	SU3648
Knight's Hill	Lambeth	51.44°N 00.10°W	TQ3273
Knightsmill	Cornwall	50.58°N 04.72°W	SX0780
Knightsridge	West Lothian	55.90°N 03.53°W	NT0469
Knightswood	City of Glasgow	55.89°N 04.36°W	NS5269
Knightwick	Worcestershire	52.19°N 02.41°W	SO7255
Knill	Herefordshire	52.23°N 03.04°W	SO2960
Knipe Fold	Cumbria	54.38°N 03.01°W	SD3499
Knipoch	Argyll and Bute	56.35°N 05.48°W	NM8523
Knipton	Leicestershire	52.87°N 00.78°W	SK8231
Knitsley	Durham	54.82°N 01.83°W	NZ1148
Kniveton	Derbyshire	53.04°N 01.70°W	SK2050
Knock	Moray	57.55°N 02.77°W	NJ5452
Knock	Cumbria	54.63°N 02.51°W	NY6727
Knockan (Sutherland)	Highland	58.04°N 05.03°W	NC2110
Knockan (Mull)	Argyll and Bute	56.32°N 06.20°W	NM4023
Knockandhu	Moray	57.29°N 03.31°W	NJ2123
Knockando	Moray	57.45°N 03.35°W	NJ1941
Knockarthur	Highland	58.02°N 04.11°W	NC7506
Knockbog	Moray	57.57°N 02.78°W	NJ5354
Knockbreck	Highland	57.54°N 06.58°W	NG2660
Knockbrex	Dumfries and Galloway	54.81°N 04.21°W	NX5849
Knockdown	Gloucestershire	51.59°N 02.24°W	ST8388
Knockenbaird	Aberdeenshire	57.35°N 02.61°W	NJ6329
Knockenkelly	North Ayrshire	55.49°N 05.10°W	NS0427
Knockentiber	East Ayrshire	55.61°N 04.55°W	NS3939
Knockerdown	Derbyshire	53.05°N 01.65°W	SK2351
Knockfarrel	Highland	57.58°N 04.51°W	NH5058
Knockglass	Highland	58.54°N 03.63°W	ND0563
Knockglass	Dumfries and Galloway	54.87°N 05.05°W	NX0458
Knockhall	Kent	51.44°N 00.28°E	TQ5974
Knockholt	Kent	51.31°N 00.12°E	TQ4859
Knockin	Shropshire	52.79°N 02.99°W	SJ3322
Knockin Heath	Shropshire	52.78°N 02.96°W	SJ3521
Knockinlaw	East Ayrshire	55.61°N 04.51°W	NS4239
Knockintorran	Western Isles	57.57°N 07.47°W	NF7367
Knocklaw	Northumberland	55.30°N 01.90°W	NU0601
Knockline	Western Isles	57.57°N 07.45°W	NF7467
Knockmill	Kent	51.32°N 00.25°E	TQ5761
Knockrome	Argyll and Bute	55.87°N 05.91°W	NR5571
Knocksharry	Isle of Man	54.23°N 04.65°W	SC2785
Knodishall	Suffolk	52.19°N 01.53°E	TM4261
Knole	Somerset	51.02°N 02.74°W	ST4825
Knollbury	Monmouthshire	51.58°N 02.82°W	ST4388
Knoll Green	Somerset	51.14°N 03.10°W	ST2339
Knolls Green	Cheshire	53.30°N 02.30°W	SJ8079
Knoll Top	North Yorkshire	54.08°N 01.71°W	SE1965
Knolton	Shropshire	52.93°N 02.93°W	SJ3738
Knolton Bryn	Wrexham	52.94°N 02.93°W	SJ3739
Knook	Wiltshire	51.16°N 02.10°W	ST9341
Knossington	Leicestershire	52.66°N 00.81°W	SK8008
Knotbury	Staffordshire	53.20°N 01.98°W	SK0168
Knott	Highland	57.49°N 06.37°W	NG3853
Knott End-on-Sea	Lancashire	53.92°N 02.99°W	SD3548
Knotting	Bedfordshire	52.25°N 00.53°W	TL0063
Knotting Green	Bedfordshire	52.24°N 00.53°W	TL0062
Knottingley	Wakefield	53.70°N 01.25°W	SE4923
Knott Lanes	Oldham	53.50°N 02.12°W	SD9201
Knott Oak	Somerset	50.92°N 02.89°W	ST3714
Knotts	Lancashire	53.97°N 02.36°W	SD7653
Knotty Ash	Liverpool	53.41°N 02.90°W	SJ4091
Knotty Corner	Devon	51.00°N 04.26°W	SS4125
Knotty Green	Buckinghamshire	51.61°N 00.65°W	SU9392
Knowbury	Shropshire	52.36°N 02.63°W	SO5774
Knowe	Dumfries and Galloway	55.00°N 04.64°W	NX3171
Knowefield	Cumbria	54.90°N 02.93°W	NY4057
Knowes	East Lothian	55.98°N 02.62°W	NT6177
Knowesgate	Northumberland	55.15°N 02.03°W	NY9885
Knowes of Elrick	Aberdeenshire	57.56°N 02.67°W	NJ6053
Knowetop	North Lanarkshire	55.77°N 03.99°W	NS7555
Knowl Bank	Staffordshire	53.03°N 02.34°W	SJ7749
Knowle (Braunton)	Devon	51.12°N 04.15°W	SS4938
Knowle (Copplestone)	Devon	50.79°N 03.73°W	SS7801
Knowle (Cullompton)	Devon	50.85°N 03.42°W	ST0007
Knowle (Budleigh Salterton)	Devon	50.63°N 03.34°W	SY0582
Knowle	Shropshire	52.35°N 02.60°W	SO5973
Knowle	Solihull	52.38°N 01.73°W	SP1876
Knowle	Somerset	51.14°N 02.95°W	ST3339
Knowle	Wiltshire	51.33°N 01.77°W	SU1660
Knowle	City of Bristol	51.42°N 02.57°W	ST6070
Knowle Fields	Worcestershire	52.21°N 01.94°W	SP0457
Knowlegate	Shropshire	52.35°N 02.60°W	SO5973
Knowle Green	Surrey	51.41°N 00.50°W	TQ0470
Knowle Green	Lancashire	53.83°N 02.56°W	SD6338
Knowle Grove	Solihull	52.37°N 01.75°W	SP1775
Knowle Hill	Surrey	51.38°N 00.59°W	SU9866
Knowle Park	Bradford	53.85°N 01.92°W	SE0540
Knowle Sands	Shropshire	52.51°N 02.41°W	SO7291
Knowles Hill	Devon	50.52°N 03.62°W	SX8571
Knowle St Giles	Somerset	50.89°N 02.93°W	ST3411
Knowl Green	Essex	52.03°N 00.59°E	TL7841
Knowl Hill	Berkshire	51.50°N 00.81°W	SU8279
Knowlton	Dorset	50.88°N 01.97°W	SU0210
Knowlton	Kent	51.23°N 01.26°E	TR2853
Knowl Wall	Staffordshire	52.94°N 02.22°W	SJ8539
Knowl Wood	Calderdale	53.69°N 02.10°W	SD9322
Knowsley	Knowsley	53.44°N 02.85°W	SJ4395
Knowsthorpe	Leeds	53.78°N 01.53°W	SE3132
Knowstone	Devon	50.99°N 03.68°W	SS8223
Knox Bridge	Kent	51.13°N 00.54°E	TQ7840
Knoxes Reef	Northumberland	55.62°N 01.65°W	NU217367
Knoydart	Highland	57.06°N 05.56°W	NG842027
Knucklas	Powys	52.35°N 03.10°W	SO2574
Knuston	Northamptonshire	52.28°N 00.63°W	SP9366
Knutsford	Cheshire	53.29°N 02.37°W	SJ7578
Knutton	Staffordshire	53.02°N 02.25°W	SJ8347
Knuzden Brook	Lancashire	53.73°N 02.44°W	SD7127
Knypersley	Staffordshire	53.10°N 02.18°W	SJ8856

== Kr ==
Location	Locality	Coordinates (links to map & photo sources)	OS grid reference
Krumlin	Calderdale	53.65°N 01.92°W	SE0518

== Ku ==
Location	Locality	Coordinates (links to map & photo sources)	OS grid reference
Kuggar	Cornwall	50.00°N 05.18°W	SW7216

== Ky ==
Location	Locality	Coordinates (links to map & photo sources)	OS grid reference
Kyleakin	Highland	57.26°N 05.73°W	NG7526
Kyle of Lochalsh	Highland	57.27°N 05.71°W	NG7627
Kylepark	South Lanarkshire	55.82°N 04.09°W	NS6961
Kylerhea	Highland	57.21°N 05.67°W	NG7820
Kylesku	Highland	58.25°N 05.03°W	NC2233
Kylestrome	Highland	58.25°N 05.05°W	NC2134
Kymin	Herefordshire	52.10°N 02.61°W	SO5845
Kymin	Monmouthshire	51.80°N 02.69°W	SO5212
Kynaston	Herefordshire	51.93°N 02.67°W	SO5427
Kynaston	Shropshire	52.77°N 02.96°W	SJ3520
Kynnersley	Shropshire	52.74°N 02.49°W	SJ6716
Kyre	Worcestershire	52.26°N 02.55°W	SO6263
Kyre Green	Worcestershire	52.25°N 02.58°W	SO6062
Kyre Park	Worcestershire	52.26°N 02.55°W	SO6263
Kyrewood	Worcestershire	52.29°N 02.58°W	SO6067
