= Knoll =

In geography, knoll is another term for a knowe or hillock, a small, low, round natural hill or mound.

Knoll may also refer to:

== Places ==
- Knoll Camp, site of an Iron Age hill fort Hampshire, England, United Kingdom
- Knoll Lake, Leonard Canyon, Arizona, United States
- The Knoll, a knoll on Ross Island, near Antarctica
- The Knoll, an estate in Hove, England, United Kingdom, (see Hangleton)
- Lambs Knoll, Utah, USA

== Brands and enterprises ==
- Knoll (company), an industrial design and office furniture manufacturing company
- Knoll Pharmaceuticals, a German drug development company taken over by Abbott Laboratories in 2002

== Other uses ==
- Knoll (oceanography), an underwater geological feature
- Knoll (surname)
- Knolls Atomic Power Laboratory, a US government research and development facility
- Knoll, a part of a ski jumping hill slope between the take-off and the landing zone

== See also ==
- Grassy Knoll (disambiguation)
- Green Knowe
- Greenknowe Tower
- Gnoll (disambiguation)
- Knol (disambiguation)
- Knole House, a stately home in Kent, England
- Knowle (disambiguation)
- Knowles (disambiguation)
