= Noll =

Noll is a surname, and may refer to:

- Chuck Noll (1932–2014), American football player and coach
- Emil Noll (born 1978), German-Congolese footballer
- Greg Noll (1937–2021), surfer
- Hans Noll (1885–1969), Swiss ornithologist and teacher
- Helmut Noll (1934–2018), German rower
- Ingrid Noll (born 1935), German thriller writer
- João Gilberto Noll (1946–2017), Brazilian writer
- John F. Noll (1875–1956), American Catholic bishop
- K. L. Noll, American biblical scholar and historian
- Kip Noll (1958–2001), American pornographic actor
- Landon Curt Noll (born 1960), American mathematician and politician
- Lou B. ("Bink") Noll (1927–1986), American poet
- Mark Noll (born 1946), American history professor and evangelical author
- A. Michael Noll (born 1939), American professor in engineering and telecommunications
- Michaela Noll (born 1959), German lawyer and politician
- Nahuel Noll (born 2003), German footballer
- Richard Noll (born 1959), American author and clinical psychologist
- Roger Noll (born 1940), American economist
- Shannon Noll (born 1975), Australian singer-songwriter
- Walter Noll (1925–2017), German-American mathematician

== See also ==
- Knoll (surname)
- Noel (surname)
- Nowell (surname)
- Knowle (disambiguation), includes list of people with surname Knowle
