= Miami Shores, Florida =

- Village
- Miami Shores Village
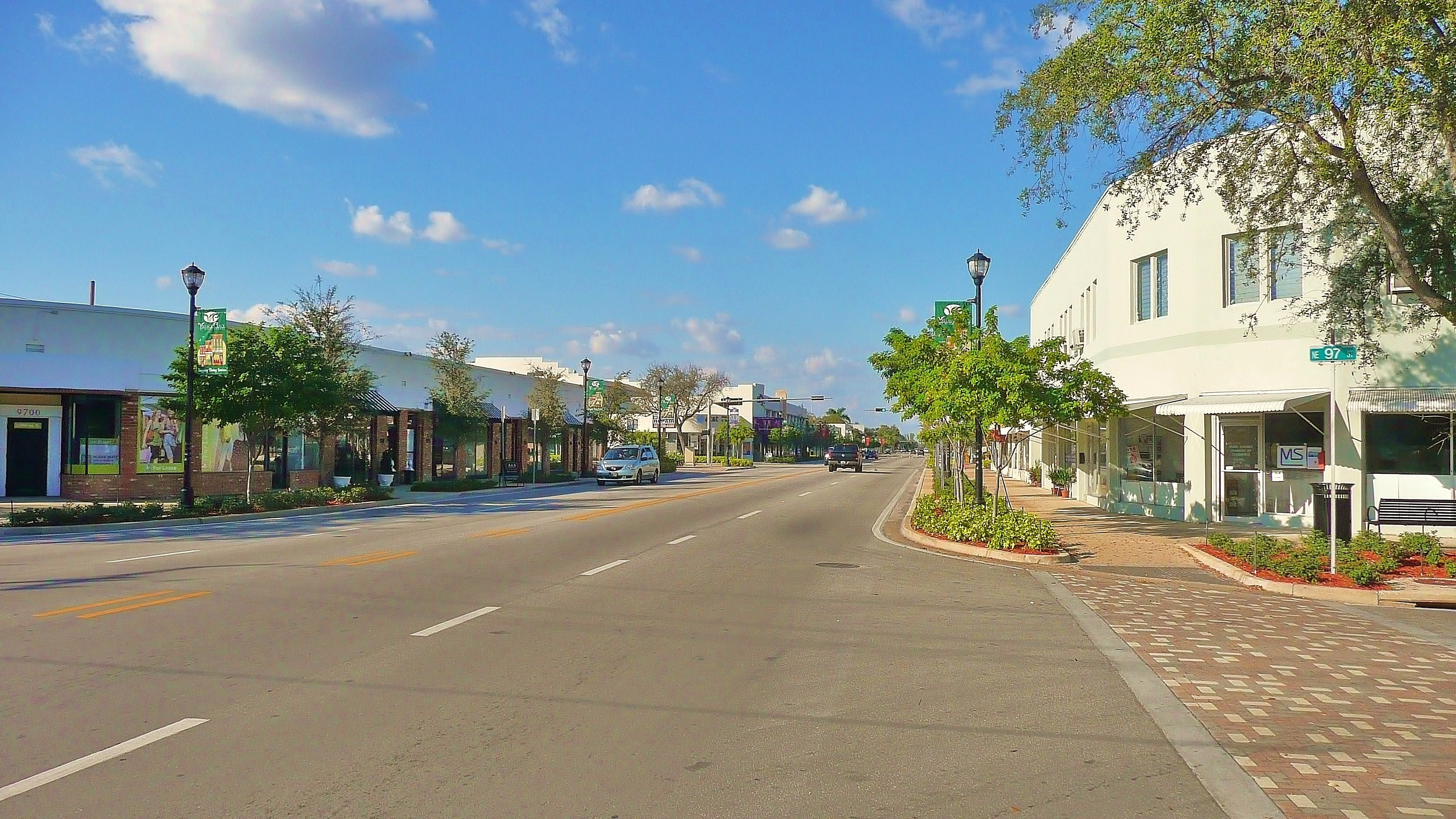
- Downtown Miami Shores

- Flag Seal
- Nickname: The Shores
- Motto: Viventes In Sole
- Location in Miami-Dade County and the state of Florida

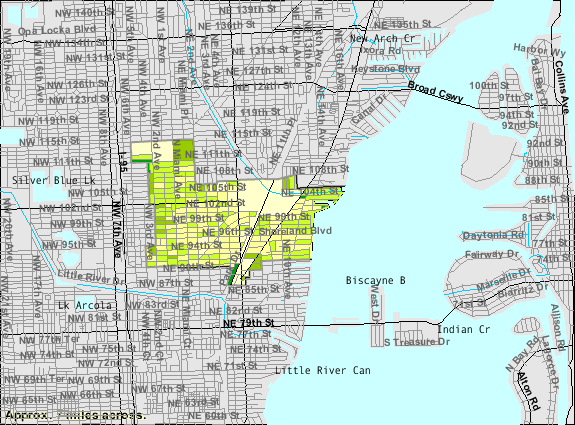
- U.S. Census Bureau map showing village boundaries
- Coordinates: 25°52′21″N 80°11′19″W
- Country: United States
- State: Florida
- County: Miami-Dade
- Incorporated: January 2, 1932

Government
  - Type: Council-Manager

Area
  - Total: 3.78 sq mi (9.79 km^{2})
  - Land: 2.49 sq mi (6.44 km^{2})
  - Water: 1.29 sq mi (3.35 km^{2})
- Elevation: 7 ft (2.1 m)

Population (2020)
  - Total: 11,567
  - Density: 4,651.5/sq mi (1,795.97/km^{2})
- Time zone: UTC-5 (EST)
  - Summer (DST): UTC-4 (EDT)
- ZIP Codes: 33138, 33150, 33153, 33161, 33168
- Area codes: 305, 786, 645
- FIPS code: 12-45175
- GNIS feature ID: 2407502
- Website: www.msvfl.gov

Miami Shores, officially Miami Shores Village, is a village in Miami-Dade County, Florida. The village is part of the Miami metropolitan area of South Florida. As of the 2020 census, the population was 11,567, up from 10,493 in 2010.

== History ==
By the early 1900s, the area encompassing today's Miami Shores was occupied by a starch (coontie) mill, a tomato packing plant, a saw mill, a pineapple plantation and a grapefruit grove. These were the various enterprises in which the early pioneers were engaged, and with the coming of the railroad and its stop at the Biscayne station, they were able to live off the land. Two of the most successful growers were Major Hugh Gordon and T.V. Moore. T.V. Moore owned the land in what is today's commercial district, while the Gordon Tract bordered the bay. By 1922, Lee T. Cooper, who had amassed his wealth from a patent medicine by the name of Tanlac, purchased T.V. Moore's land holdings. Cooper planned to develop the area and named it "Bay View Estates". In 1924, the Shoreland Company purchased the Gordon Tract, Bay View Estates and other scattered acreage in order to create Miami Shores, "America's Mediterranean".

Hugh M. Anderson, president of the Shoreland Company, and its board of directors were experienced real estate developers. They had previously completed the successful development of the Venetian Islands in Miami Beach, and they decided that their new project would be similar – residences of Italian-inspired architecture within a landscape associated with water. The master development plan for Greater Miami Shores included 9,000 building sites, 5 2/3 miles of bay frontage, four miles of inland waterways and ten miles of main roadways. The plans also called for the construction of a causeway to Miami Beach, a golf course, a country club, a yacht club, a business district, apartment buildings, hotels, a school and churches, a railroad station and beautifying features such as parks, plazas and entryways.

A total of 118 upscale Mediterranean homes were built by the Shoreland Company. These homes have great historic value, and 25 have been designated on the National Register of Historic Places so far. The commercial building program was in progress, sidewalks and roadways were being laid out, and lighting and landscape work was well underway. Record-setting sales and resales of property were being recorded. Unfortunately, on September 18, 1926, all plans for the community came to a halt with the arrival of a devastating hurricane. This and other factors contributed to the Shoreland Company's bankruptcy in 1927.

In 1928, the New Miami Shores Corporation purchased the Shoreland Company's holdings. This corporation was controlled by Bessemer Properties, part of the interests of the Wolstenholme family of New York. Roy H. Hawkins, the general manager of Bessemer Properties, proceeded with the plans for the community. He is credited as being the "principal founder" of Miami Shores. In 1931, under his leadership, a request to grant a charter creating the Miami Shores Village was presented in the state legislature.

The present Miami Shores roughly corresponds with the original "Biscayne" neighborhood of the city of Miami. With the arrival of the Great Depression, Miami gave up its jurisdiction and the area incorporated under the name "Miami Shores Village" in 1932. Previously, part of the area that now comprises the city of North Miami had been known as Miami Shores. Under the leadership of Roy H. Hawkins, a request to grant a charter creating Miami Shores Village was presented in the state legislature. On January 2, 1932, the village became official at a council meeting. The charter named the following five members to the first council: Hugh H. Gordon, a banker whose father had owned the Gordon Tract; Frank O. Pruitt, who was in the insurance business; John M. Carlisle, president of the Eli Witt Cigar Company; W.F. Andes, a prominent dentist; and M.R. Harrison, a general contractor, who constructed much of Biscayne Boulevard. At this first meeting, Pruitt was elected mayor, and other appointments were made including Village Manager Miller Williams, Village Attorney George E. Holt, and a single policeman, Ed Badger.

In the decades that followed its incorporation, growth was steady. A variety of architectural styles were introduced, yet the community emerged as the type of development the Shoreland Company had envisioned. The community retains many of its original characteristics – well situated and served by major highways, having tree-lined streets and wide roads, a downtown area, well-maintained homes provided with efficient services. and a variety of community activities.

Miami Shores is primarily a bedroom community for those working in the Miami metropolitan area, and it also has a sizable retired population. The village is mostly single family residential homes, with very few multi-family units and only two small commercial areas along Northeast 2nd Avenue and Biscayne Boulevard.

While it is frequently referred to as Miami Shores or the Village of Miami Shores, the municipality's official name under its charter is Miami Shores Village.

== Geography ==
Miami Shores is located in northeastern Miami-Dade County and is bordered to the north by Biscayne Park, to the west by unincorporated Pinewood, to the southwest by El Portal, to the south by the city of Miami, to the east by Biscayne Bay and, across the bay, by the city of Miami Beach.

According to the United States Census Bureau, the village has a total area of 3.78 square miles (9.79 km^{2}). 2.49 sq mi (6.45 km^{2}) of it are land, and 1.29 sq mi (3.34 km^{2}) of it (34.19%) are water.

== Demographics ==
Historical population
Census	Pop.	Note	%±
1930	612		—
1940	1,956		219.6%
1950	5,086		160.0%
1960	8,865		74.3%
1970	9,425		6.3%
1980	9,244		−1.9%
1990	10,084		9.1%
2000	10,380		2.9%
2010	10,493		1.1%
2020	11,567		10.2%
U.S. Decennial Census

=== 2020 census ===
Miami Shores racial composition (Hispanics excluded from racial categories) (NH = Non-Hispanic)
Race	Number	Percentage
White (NH)	4,243	36.68%
Black or African American (NH)	2,072	17.91%
Native American or Alaska Native (NH)	12	0.10%
Asian (NH)	288	2.49%
Pacific Islander or Native Hawaiian (NH)	5	0.04%
Some other race (NH)	66	0.57%
Two or more races/Multiracial (NH)	421	3.64%
Hispanic or Latino	4,460	38.56%
Total	11,567	

As of the 2020 census, Miami Shores had a population of 11,567. The median age was 38.0 years. 18.3% of residents were under the age of 18 and 14.6% were 65 years of age or older. For every 100 females, there were 87.7 males, and for every 100 females age 18 and over there were 85.1 males.

100.0% of residents lived in urban areas, while 0.0% lived in rural areas.

There were 3,656 households in Miami Shores, of which 35.7% had children under the age of 18 living in them. Of all households, 56.2% were married-couple households, 15.3% were households with a male householder and no spouse or partner present, and 22.1% were households with a female householder and no spouse or partner present. About 21.5% of all households were made up of individuals and 8.8% had someone living alone who was 65 years of age or older.

There were 3,905 housing units, of which 6.4% were vacant. The homeowner vacancy rate was 2.0% and the rental vacancy rate was 8.1%.

The 2020 ACS 5-year estimates reported 2,328 families residing in the village.

=== 2010 census ===
Miami Shores Demographics
2010 Census	Miami Shores	Miami-Dade County	Florida
Total population	10,493	2,496,435	18,801,310
Population, percent change, 2000 to 2010	+1.1%	+10.8%	+17.6%
Population density	4,191.9/sq mi	1,315.5/sq mi	350.6/sq mi
White or Caucasian (including White Hispanic)	49.1%	73.8%	75.0%
(Non-Hispanic White or Caucasian)	42.1%	15.4%	57.9%
Black or African-American	23.8%	18.9%	16.0%
Hispanic or Latino (of any race)	30.6%	65.0%	22.5%
Asian	2.6%	1.5%	2.4%
Native American or Native Alaskan	0.3%	0.2%	0.4%
Some Other Race	2.3%	3.2%	3.6%

As of the 2010 United States census, there were 10,493 people, 3,477 households, and 2,164 families residing in the village.

Based on 2010 data, the ancestries of only the Hispanic and Latino population from highest to lowest were as follows: Cubans made up 33.41%, South Americans were at 25.97%, Puerto Ricans accounted for 11.48%, Central Americans totaled 10.70%, and Mexicans were 2.95% of the Hispanic/Latino population.

Between 2012 and 2016, 40.2% of village residents spoke a language other than English at home, 49.2% possessed a bachelor's degree or higher, and the median household income was $101,047. About 6.5% of the population were below the poverty line.

=== 2000 census ===
In 2000, 32.1% had children under the age of 18 living with them, 51.0% were married couples living together, 12.1% had a female householder with no husband present, and 33.0% were non-families. 23.4% of all households were made up of individuals, and 9.8% had someone living alone who was 65 years of age or older. The average household size was 2.67 and the average family size was 3.24. The village also has one of the highest percentages of homosexual couples in the United States.

In 2000, the village population was spread out, with 22.5% under the age of 18, 12.1% from 18 to 24, 28.9% from 25 to 44, 24.0% from 45 to 64, and 12.6% who were 65 years of age or older. The median age was 38 years. For every 100 females, there were 95.1 males. For every 100 females age 18 and over, there were 91.7 males.

In 2000, the median income for a household in the village was $56,306, and the median income for a family was $64,963. Males had a median income of $42,373 versus $35,530 for females. The per capita income for the village was $26,134. About 6.9% of families and 8.8% of the population were below the poverty line, including 11.2% of those under age 18 and 7.6% of those age 65 or over.

== Government ==
=== Form of government ===
The village operates under a council-manager system. It has a city council of five members, who are elected at-large. The Village Charter provides that the two individuals receiving the highest number of votes are elected to four-year terms. The individual(s) receiving the next highest number of votes is elected to a two-year term. The position of mayor is selected by the council at its inaugural meeting. Historically, the individual receiving the highest number of votes is selected to serve as the mayor and holds this position for two years of the four-year term. At the conclusion of his or her term as mayor, the individual retains a seat on the council as a "regular" council member for the next two years. Elections are held every two years, with either two or three seats being open at each election in the ordinary course of events.

Each council member is a voting member of the council, with the mayor serving as the chair. The council is responsible for enacting most village laws, approving capital expenditures, and hiring the village manager. There are also a number of administrative boards, such as planning & zoning, code enforcement, and personnel appeals, that manage various aspects of the village government.

The village manager is the chief executive officer in charge of managing the day-to-day functions of the village. The village maintains its own police department, but fire services are supplied by the county, with Miami-Dade Fire Rescue Department Station No. 38 located in the village.

=== Regulation of vegetable gardens ===
In 2013, two residents, a married couple named Hermine Ricketts and Tom Carroll, were cited by the village under a code provision that prohibited vegetable gardens in front yards. The majority of the couple's front yard was planted with various vegetables, and had been in place for 17 years. The garden, which regularly received compliments from neighbors, supplied about 80% of the couple's meals. And although the garden had existed for 17 years, the city could produce no record of a single complaint. Nonetheless, just weeks after amending its ordinances "for clarity," the Miami Shores Code Enforcement Board ordered the couple to destroy the garden or face recurring fines of $50 per day.

The Institute for Justice filed a suit on their behalf, claiming that the "backyard only" rule was arbitrary and violated the couple's property rights under the Florida Constitution. The story garnered national attention. On August 25, 2016, Judge Monica Gordo granted the village's summary judgment motion, finding that, "the prohibition of vegetable gardens except in backyards is rationally related to Miami Shores' legitimate interest in promoting and maintaining aesthetics," and that the rule therefore "passes constitutional scrutiny."

The ruling subsequently was upheld by the Florida Third District Court of Appeal, which stated, "Following the ineluctable conclusion that the Village ordinance does not restrict a fundamental right or suspect class, [two cases previously discussed] control the analysis in this case. The ordinance is constitutional. We agree with the trial court's parting observation that the appellants 'still have a remedy. They can petition the Village Council to change the ordinance. They can also support candidates for Council who agree with their view that the ordinance should be repealed.'" The city defended the ruling, saying that "without any arbiter of taste, residents could get stuck living next to a polka-dot house with pigs taking mud baths by the garage and an Oscar Mayer Wienermobile on the swale."

Although the case gathered local and national news attention, the Supreme Court of Florida declined to hear the case.

In the spring of 2019 representatives from the Florida Senate and House of Representatives passed legislation to protect private property rights and override local ordinances and allow vegetable gardens to be grown and cared for by property owners within any location on their property. The current Florida governor signed the legislature on June 24, 2019, creating Florida Statute 604.71. The new ordinance became effective July 1, 2019.

The preamble to Florida Statute 604.71 reads:

"An Act Relating to Vegetable Gardens: Providing legislative intent: Prohibiting local governments from regulating vegetable gardens on residential properties except as otherwise provided by law; specifying that such regulations are void and unenforceable; specifying exceptions; providing applicability; defining the term 'vegetable garden'; providing and effective date".

=== Alleged racial discrimination in seatbelt ticketing ===
Following the January 2016 report "Racial Disparities in Florida Safety Belt Law Enforcement", published by the ACLU (which did not mention Miami Shores), local CBS-affiliate station WFOR-TV gathered additional statistics from the Florida Department of Highway Safety and Motor Vehicles. One sentence in the report noted that "in Miami Shores, there were 261 seat belt citations issued with 186 [(71%)] going to blacks." The report did not discuss whether any of the drivers were initially stopped for other violations. It also failed to note the area's large African American population. At the time, the population of Miami Shores was roughly 24% African American, as compared to 18.9% for Miami-Dade County and 16.31% for Florida as a whole. More significantly, though, the neighborhoods surrounding Miami Shores have large African American majorities. For example, North Miami's population is roughly six times that of Miami Shores, 58.9% being African American (i.e., the African American population of North Miami is more than three times the total population of Miami Shores). Other nearby neighborhoods include Little Haiti (64.9% African American), West Little River (57.2% African American), Gladeview (76.98% African American), and Westview (75.6% African American).

== Educational institutions ==
Miami-Dade County Public Schools operates district public schools serving Miami Shores:

MDCPS schools

- Miami Shores Elementary School
- Horace Mann Middle School
- Miami Edison High School (in Miami)

The following public, charter, and private schools are located in Miami Shores:

- Miami Shores Elementary School
- Doctors Charter School of Miami Shores at Barry University
- Miami Country Day School
- Miami Shores Presbyterian Church School
- Miami Shores Baptist Church Academy
- Miami Shores Community School
- Miami Shores Montessori School
- St. Rose of Lima Catholic School of the Roman Catholic Archdiocese of Miami

=== Colleges and universities ===
- Barry University's main campus is located in Miami Shores.

== Public library ==
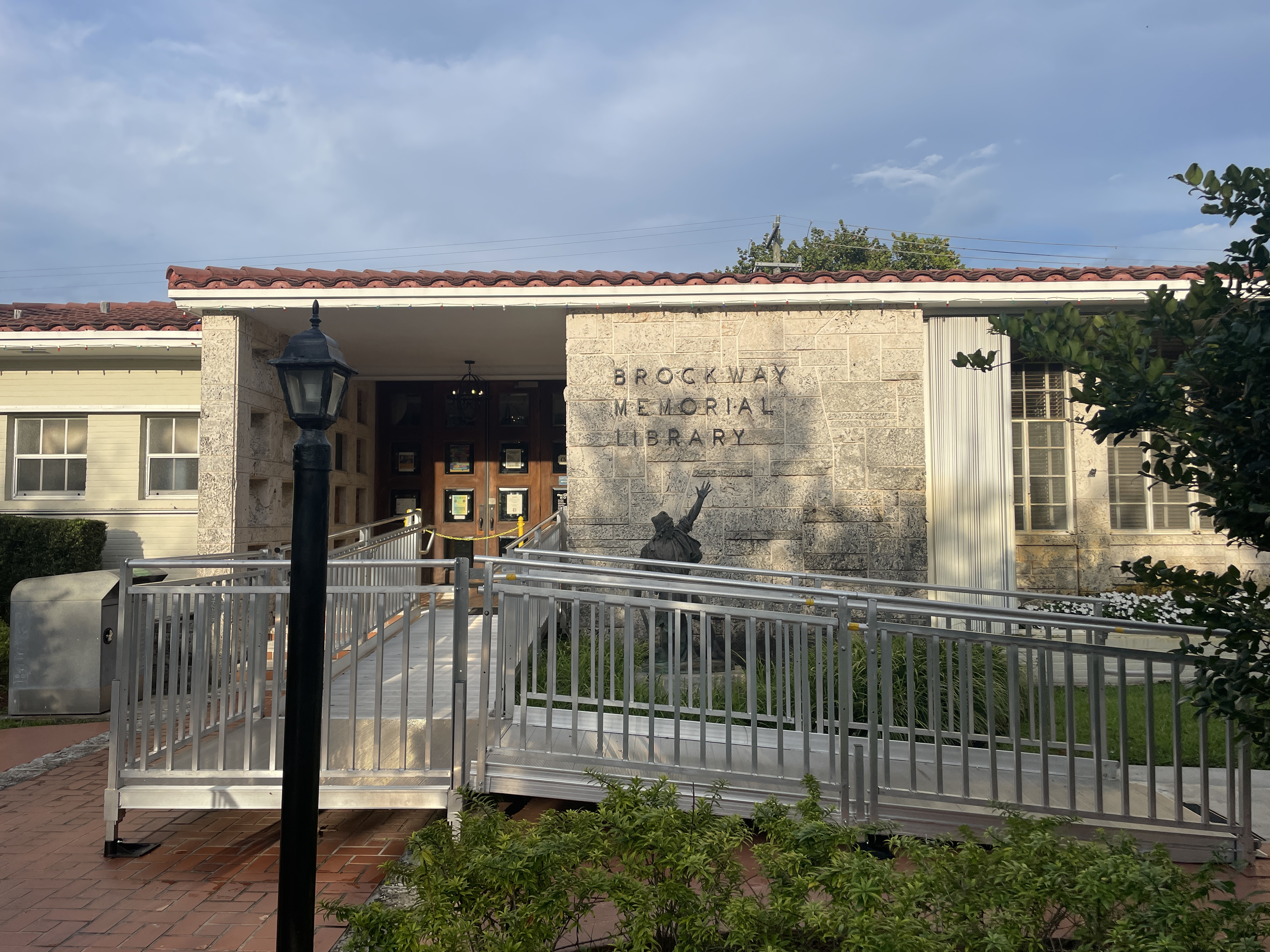
Front of the Brockway Memorial Library building

Brockway Memorial Library was founded in 1949. While over the years the countywide Miami-Dade Public Library System has taken over the libraries of most of the cities in the county, the Miami Shores public library has remained independent.

This independent public library first opened in February 1949 due to the generosity of George A. Brockway, an industrialist and part-time South Florida resident, who donated the funds to build the library. The land the library was built on was donated by Bessemer Properties under the management of Roy H. Hawkins. This library is considered the central cultural and educational hub of Miami Shores. Brockway Memorial Library offers patrons a large and diverse collection of materials that contain, print books, magazines, newspapers, online databases, eBooks, multimedia resources, such as computers, DVDs, music, and a diversity of social clubs and activities to serve the patrons and the community at large.

In 2002, funds were raised to add 2,500 square feet to the library. "This new addition was a multimedia room housing, electronic books, dedicated spaces for videos and audio books, reference materials, a computer center and the Miami Shores Archives." The Miami Shores Archives is a special collection of local area history. The library's schedule is available online.

== See also ==
- Miami Shores Thematic Resource
- National Register of Historic Places listings in Miami-Dade County, Florida

== Gallery ==
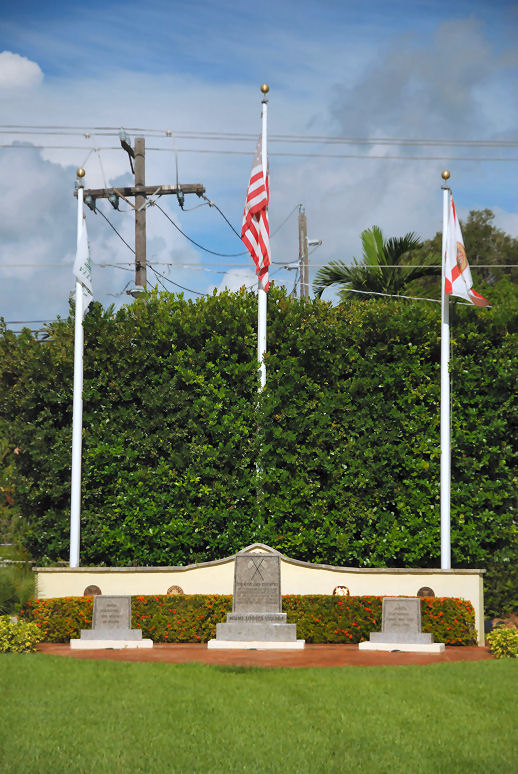
Memorial Park

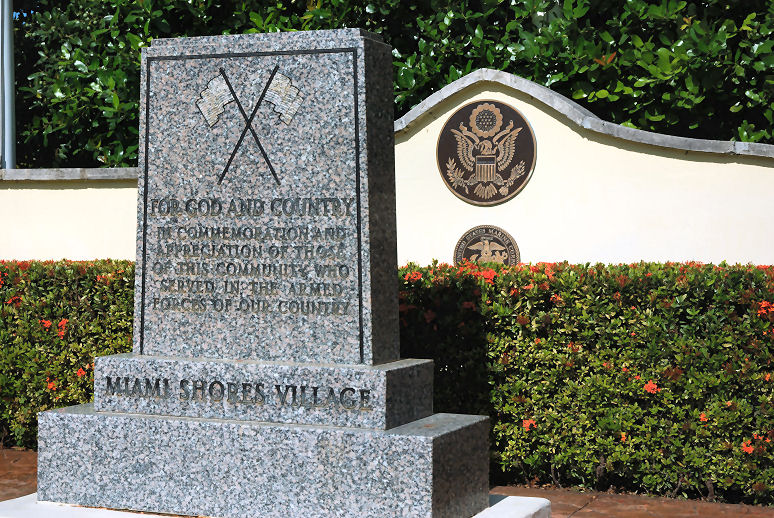
Memorial Park

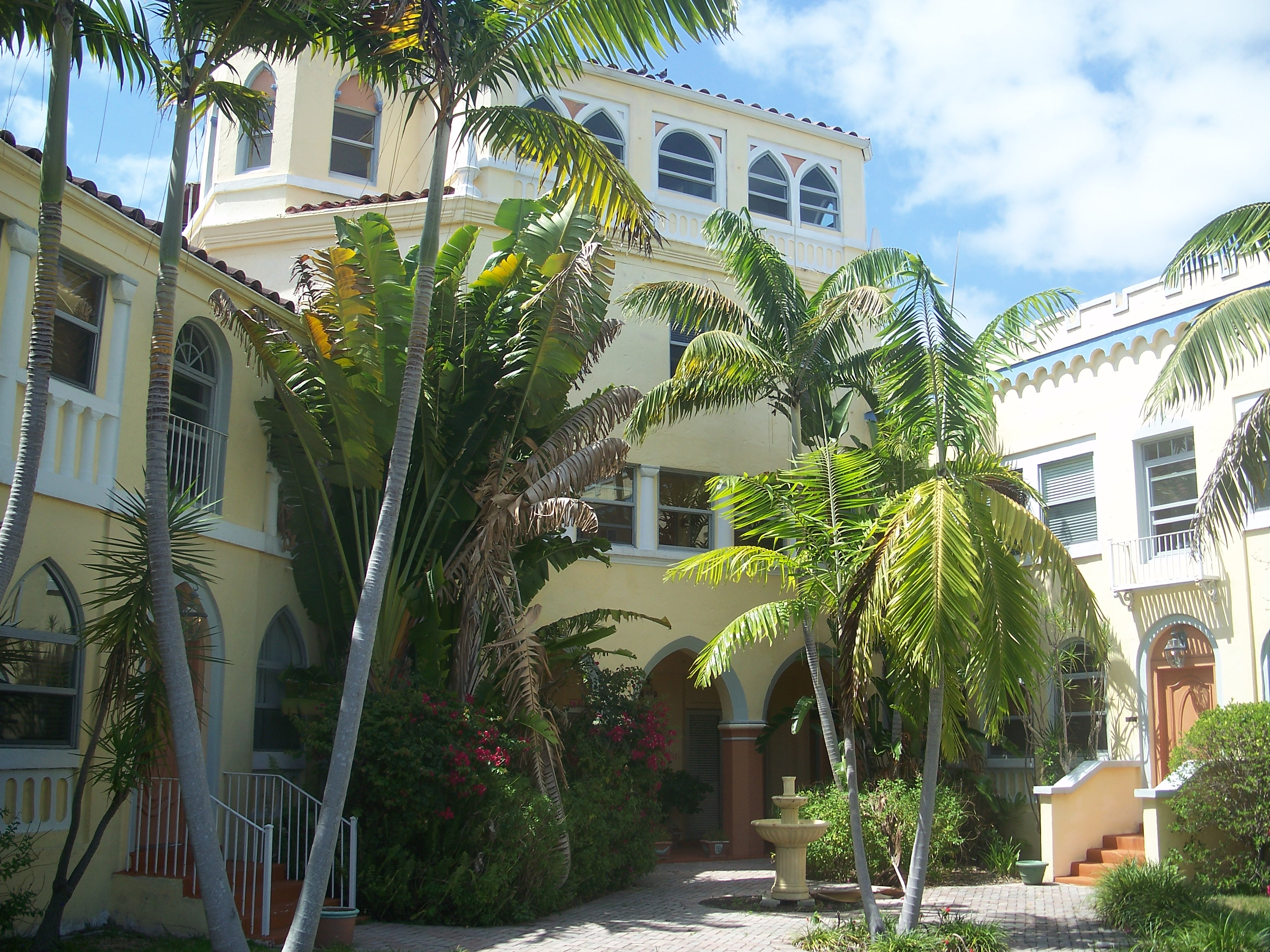
Grand Concourse Apartments

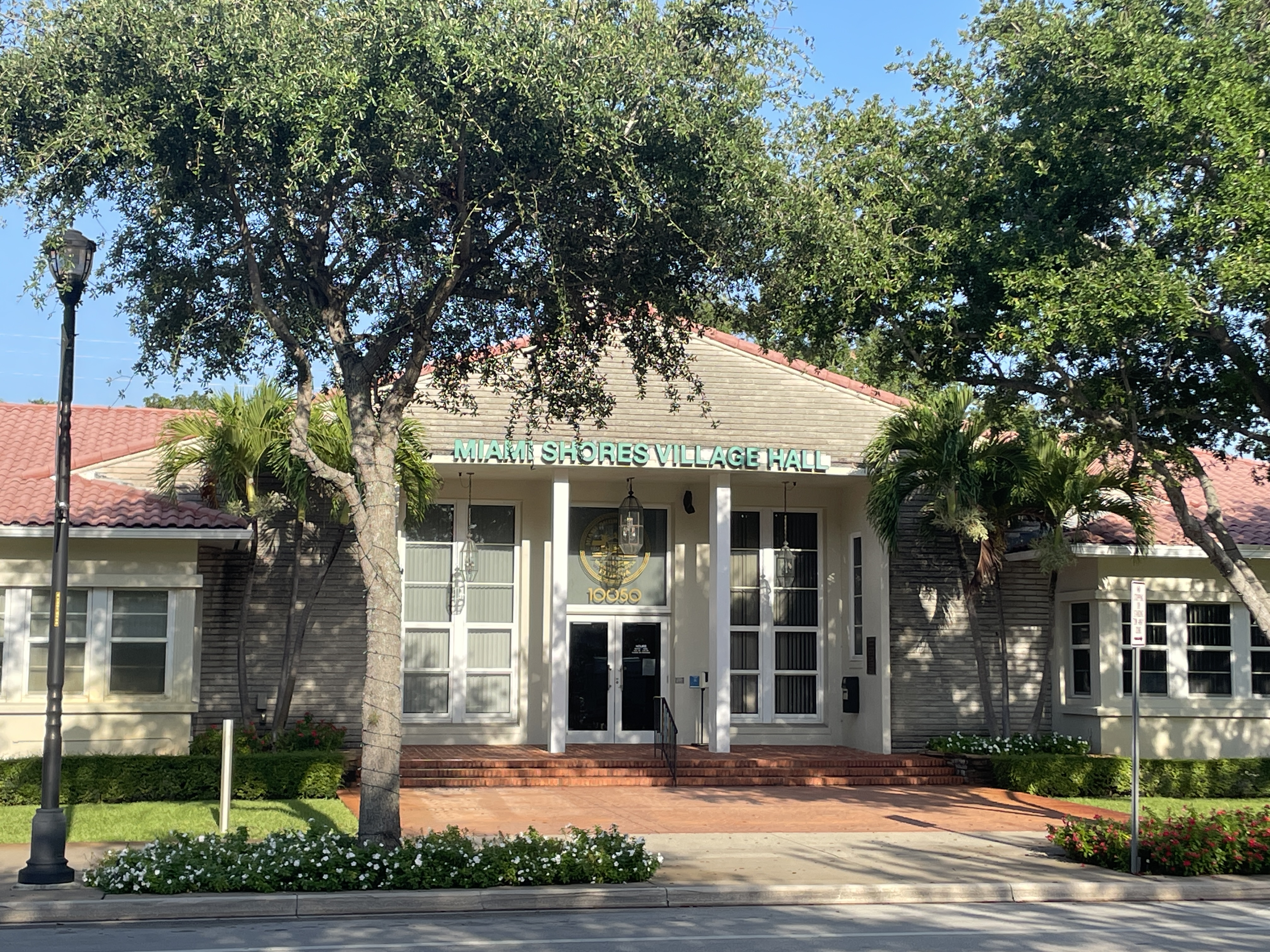
Village Hall of Miami Shores
