= Nowell (surname) =

Nowell is a surname. Notable people with the surname include:

- Alexander Nowell (c.1507–1602), Anglican Puritan theologian and clergyman; dean of St Paul's
- Andrew Nowell, English politician, MP for Rutland
- Ben Nowell (born 1985), New Zealand rugby player
- Bradley Nowell (1968–1996), American musician, lead singer and guitarist of the ska punk band Sublime
- Howard Wilbert Nowell (1872–1940), instructor in pathology at Boston University and cancer researcher
- Increase Nowell (1590–1655), colonial administrator, founder of Charlestown, Massachusetts
- Jack Nowell (born 1993), rugby player
- Jaylen Nowell (born 1999), American basketball player
- Laurence Nowell (c.1530–c.1570), English antiquarian, cartographer and scholar
- Laurence Nowell (priest) (died 1576), English churchman, Archdeacon of Derby and Dean of Lichfield, cousin of the antiquary
- Louis R. Nowell (1915–2009), Los Angeles fire captain and politician
- Markquis Nowell (born 1999), American basketball player
- Mel Nowell (born 1940), American basketball player
- Peter Nowell (1928–2016), cancer researcher and professor
- Thomas Nowell (1730?–1801), English clergyman, historian and religious controversialist
- Virginia Nowell (1892–1960), American publicist, serial litigant
- Wedgwood Nowell (1878–1957), American film and stage actor

== See also ==
- Radulf Novell, 12th century Anglo-Norman prelate whose name is sometimes spelled "Robert Nowell"
- Noel (surname)
- Noll, surname
- Knoll (surname)
- Knowle (disambiguation), includes list of people with surname Knowle
