= Gnoll =

Gnoll may refer to:

- Gnoll Country Park, a park in Wales
- The Gnoll, a sports ground in Wales
- Gnoll (fictional creature), a fictional species of human-hyena hybrids

== See also ==
- Gnole, a fictional entity in The Book of Wonder anthology
- Knoll (disambiguation)
- Knol (disambiguation)
