= Knoll (surname) =

Knoll or Knöll is a surname. Notable people with the surname include:

- Albert Knoll (1796–1863), Austrian theologian
- Andrew H. Knoll (born 1951), American paleontologist
- Anton Knoll (born 2004), Austrian diver
- Catherine Baker Knoll (1930–2008), American politician from Pennsylvania
- Corina Knoll, American journalist
- Christoph Knoll (1563–1630), German theologian and hymn writer
- Erwin Knoll (1931–1994), American journalist
- Florence Knoll (1917–2019), American architect and furniture designer
- Franklin J. Knoll (born 1940), American politician, lawyer, and judge
- Gertraud Knoll (born 1958), Austrian pastor and politician
- Hans Knoll (1914–1955), German-American co-founder of the Knoll company; husband of Florence
- Hans Knöll (1913–1978), German physician and microbiologist
- Jessica Knoll, American author of Luckiest Girl Alive
- Johanna Knoll, German rower
- Jeannette Knoll (born 1943), American jurist from Louisiana
- John Knoll (born 1962), co-writer of Adobe Photoshop
- József Knoll, drug researcher who developed selegiline
- Katy Knoll (born 2001), American ice hockey player
- Konrad Knoll (1829–1899), German sculptor
- Manuel Knoll (politician) (born 1990), German politician
- Marvin Knoll (born 1990), German footballer
- Max Knoll (1897–1969), German electrical engineer, inventor and professor
- Michael Knoll, law professor
- Mike Knoll (born 1951), American football coach
- Mireille Knoll (1932–2018), French murder victim
- Samuel Benjamin Cnoll (1705–1767), German physician
- Silke-Beate Knoll (born 1967), German sprinter
- Stephan Knoll, South Australian politician
- Tim Knoll, American freestyle BMX rider
- Thomas Knoll (born 1960), co-writer of Adobe Photoshop and brother of John
- Will Knoll, co-founder of Parker Knoll, a British furniture manufacturing company
- Xenia Knoll (born 1992), Swiss tennis player

== Middle names ==
- James Knoll Gardner (1940–2017), American judge

== See also ==
- Noll, surname
- Noel (surname)
- Nowell (surname)
- Knowle (disambiguation), includes list of people with surname Knowle
