= Doctors Charter School of Miami Shores =

Charter school in Miami Shores, Florida, U.S.

Coordinates: 25°52′44″N 80°12′21″W

Location
- 11301 NW 5 Avenue; Miami Shores, Florida 33168; United States

Information
- School type: Public, charter
- Established: 2005
- School district: Miami-Dade County Public Schools
- Director: Edwin Acevedo
- Faculty: 32.00 (FTE)
- Grades: 6-12
- Enrollment: 596 (2022–23)
- Student to teacher ratio: 18.62
- Campus type: Suburban
- Colors: Blue, white, and red
- Mascot: Hawk
- Website: https://www.doctorscharterschool.org/

Doctors Charter School of Miami Shores is a public charter school located on 5 acres (20,000 m^{2}) at Barry University Campus in Miami Shores, in the U.S. state of Florida.

== Overview ==
Doctors Charter School of Miami Shores is a community-based, "A" rated college preparatory school. It is located within the Miami-Dade County Public School District and holds a municipal charter through the Village of Miami Shores.

== History ==
Doctors Charter School of Miami Shores originally opened in 1997 as a middle school called Miami Shores/Barry University Charter School. The school included nine portable structures built on the corner of NW 115th Street and NW 2nd Avenue, and served as an alternative to Horace Mann Middle School for Miami Shores residents.

Upon gaining further funding in 2005, the school was renamed Doctors Charter School of Miami Shores. A permanent structure was built on land that once was the home of the Biscayne Kennel Club, and later owned by Barry University. It was built with funds from the North Dade Medical Foundation and the financial support of the citizens of Miami Shores.

== See also ==
- Miami-Dade County Public Schools
- High school
- Education in the United States
