= Kirstead =

Civil parish in Norfolk, England

Coordinates: 52.52649°N 1.3869°E

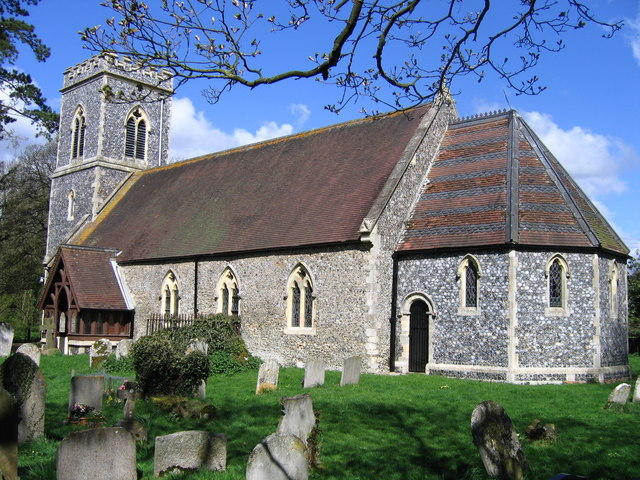

- Location within Norfolk
- Area: 4.19 km^{2} (1.62 sq mi)
- Population: 279
  - Density: 67/km^{2} (170/sq mi)
- OS grid reference: TM298974
- Civil parish: Kirstead
- District: South Norfolk
- Shire county: Norfolk
- Region: East
- Country: England
- Sovereign state: United Kingdom
- Post town: NORWICH
- Postcode district: NR15
- Dialling code: 01508
- Police: Norfolk
- Fire: Norfolk
- Ambulance: East of England
- UK Parliament: South Norfolk

Kirstead is a civil parish in the English county of Norfolk.

The main settlement is Kirstead Green. The parish covers an area of 4.19 km^{2} (1.62 sq mi) and had a population of 247 in 89 households at the 2001 census, the population increasing to 279 at the 2011 census. For the purposes of local government, it falls within the district of South Norfolk.

In 1870-72, Kirstead was described by John Marius Wilson such as:

Kirstead, a village and a parish in Loddon district, Norfolk. The village stands 4 1/4 miles W of Loddon, and 5 1/2 ESE of Swainsthorpe r. station; and has a postoffice under Norwich.

== The Village ==
There are no pubs in Kirstead itself, however, there are fourteen within a five-mile radius of the village. There is also Kirstead Hall described as,

"a fine Grade I listed Elizabethan Manor house Circa 1570 of E-shaped plan with stepped Flemish gable ends. The brickwork with attractive blue diaper decoration and pin tiled roof standing in 4 acres."

There are three regular bus services through Kirstead connecting the village with Bungay, Norwich and Halesworth. The nearest railway station is Norwich.

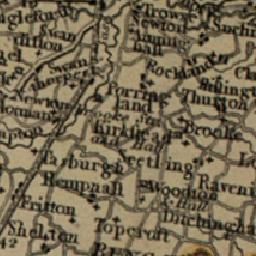
19th Century map of Kirstead within the surrounding area.

== Demography ==
In 1801, Kirstead had a total population of 168. This rose and fell until 1951 where it recorded its lowest population of 149 people but since then, the population has increased to 279, as seen in the 2011 census. According to the 2011 Census, the majority of the population are White British with 66.3% being Christian. There are no other recorded religions, with the rest of the population having no religion (26.5%) or not stating (6%).

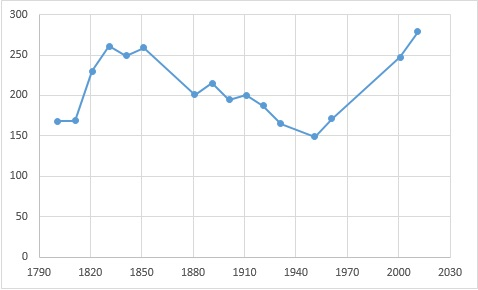
Illustrates the population of Kirstead from 1801 to 2011.

There is a very clear difference in the different professions that each gender undertook. Jobs that required manual labour such as agriculture and workers in various mineral and vegetable substances were all undertaken by males. There are no female professionals.

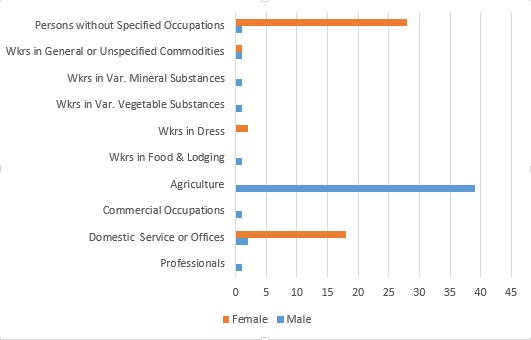
Professions in Kirstead 1881

== Education ==
In total, 17 residents of Kirstead have no education. According to the 2011 Census, 31 people have a higher qualification of a degree and 169 with qualifications below a degree. There are a number of primary and secondary schools within the surrounding area of Kirstead and they boast a number of well performing institutions.

== History ==
Kirstead Hall

In 1095 the site was part of the outlying lands of the Abbey of Bury St Edmunds. The distance between the church and the village’s location in present-day is thought to have been due to the Black Death which struck in 1450. The old village’s population decreased resulting in a new one being built in a different location.

Under the reign of Henry VIII c.1535 the abbey was closed due to the introduction of the Church of England and the site was bought by John and Elizabeth Cook. In 1544 the building and surrounding land was bought by Thomas Godsalve who was a lawyer in the Court of Norwich to expand his large estate.

The building was inherited by his son Sir John Godsalve who was Clerk of the Signet to Henry VII and under Edward VI was Comptroller of the Mint. His son Thomas in turn took over ownership and extended it to become a house and the hall it is today.

Kirstead War Memorial

To the right of St Margaret's Churchyard lies Kirstead War Memorial which honours the memory of the seventeen people who were killed in World War I.
