= John Noel =

John Noel may refer to:

- John Noel (1659–1718), Member of Parliament for Rutland
- John Noel (1702–1728), Member of Parliament for Rutland
- Jack Noel (1856–1936), Australian cricketer
- John Baptist Lucius Noel (1890–1989), British mountaineer
- John Noel (mayor) (1762–1817), American politician who served as Mayor of Savannah
- John Noel (sport shooter) (1888–1939), American sport shooter
- John Noel (producer) (born 1952), British television producer and theatrical agent
- John Fraser Noel (1942–1966), British engineer in Antarctica
- John M. Noel (born 1948), American businessman
- John Noel, Oil and Gas Campaigns Coordinator for Clean Water Action

== See also ==
- John William Noell (1816–1863), U.S. politician
