= Listed buildings in Nash, South Shropshire =

Nash is a civil parish in Shropshire, England. It contains seven listed buildings that are recorded in the National Heritage List for England. Of these, two are at Grade II*, the middle of the three grades, and the others are at Grade II, the lowest grade. The parish contains the village of Nash and the surrounding countryside. The listed buildings consist of a 14th-century church, a former manor house and associated structures, a country house, a farmhouse, and a row of houses, originally almshouses.

== Key ==
Grade	Criteria
II*	Particularly important buildings of more than special interest
II	Buildings of national importance and special interest

== Buildings ==
Name and location	Photograph	Date	Notes	Grade
St John the Baptist's Church; 52.34204°N 2.58245°W		Early 14th century	The top of the tower and spire were added in the later 14th century, the church was restored and the aisle and vestry were added in 1865. It is built in stone with a tile roof and ornamental ridge tiles, and consists of nave and chancel in one cell, a south porch, a north aisle, a north vestry, and a west tower. The tower contains a lancet window and round-headed slits, and has a shingled broach spire. The gabled porch is timber framed with a tile roof and internal benches.	II*
Redford Farmhouse; 52.34962°N 2.58051°W	—	Late 16th century	The ground floor is in brick and stone, above it the farmhouse is timber framed with brick infill, and it has a tile roof. There are two storeys and an attic, a main block of five bays, and rear gabled extensions. Between the storeys is a moulded bressumer, there is a central doorway with a gabled hood, and the windows are casements.	II
Court of Hill; 52.35336°N 2.58655°W	—	1683	A manor house that was altered in the early 19th century and in 1927. It is in brick with stone dressings, quoins, moulded string courses, a concave cornice, and a hipped tile roof. There are two storeys and an attic, a main block with a double-pile plan and a front of seven bays, and rear extension wings. The windows on the front are mullioned and transomed, at the rear they are casements, and there are dormers with hipped roofs on the front and elsewhere. Above the central doorway is a tablet with armorial bearings.	II*
Kitchen garden pavilion and walls 52.35229°N 2.58985°W	—	18th century	The kitchen garden to the southwest of the Court of Hill is surrounded by brick walls forming a quadrangle. At the entrance is a brick pavilion with a slate roof, hipped at the rear. On the garden front a flight of step leads up to a stone portico that has a pair of unfluted Roman Doric columns between pilasters, and a plain entablature and pediment with shallow modillioned cornices. In the wall opposite the portico is a gateway with brick piers and ball finials.	II
Nash Court; 52.34159°N 2.58457°W		c. 1760	A country house, at one time used as a school, it is in brick with stone dressings, with a dentil course cornice, a parapet, and a hipped tile roof. There are three storeys and a cellar, and an L-shaped plan, with two ranges at right angles, and later extensions. The east front has five bays, a porch with four Tuscan columns and a doorway with pilasters. Above it is a window flanked by Tuscan pilasters and with an open pediment, and the other windows are sashes. To the right is a two-storey extension with a parapeted bay window. The south front has five bays and two bay windows.	II
Dovecote; 52.35304°N 2.58709°W	—	1767	The dovecote is in the grounds of the Court of Hill. It is in brick on a moulded stone plinth, with a band, and a tile roof. The dovecote has an octagonal plan, and the roof is surmounted by open-arched lantern with a lead cupola and a dated weathervane. It contains a round-headed doorway with a semicircular-arch brick lintel.	II
Rugpits; 52.32705°N 2.60054°W		1859	A terrace of six houses, originally almshouses, in red brick with tile roofs. There are three coped and shaped gables with finials on the front, and one at each end. The houses have a single storey and attics, the windows are casements, and at the rear each house has a gabled dormer.	II
