= Nowell =

Nowell may refer to:

- Nowell (given name)
- Nowell (surname)
- Nowell, Wisconsin, a U.S. ghost town

== See also ==
- "The First Nowell" or "The First Noel", a traditional English carol
- Novell
