= Nash, south Shropshire =

Village in Shropshire, England

Coordinates: 52.342°N 2.582°W

Nash
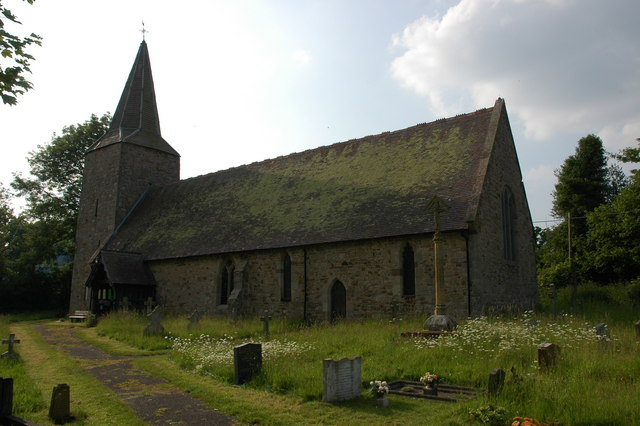
- St John the Baptist Church, Nash

- Location within Shropshire
- Population: 405 (2011)
- OS grid reference: SO601718
- Civil parish: Nash
- Unitary authority: Shropshire
- Ceremonial county: Shropshire
- Region: West Midlands
- Country: England
- Sovereign state: United Kingdom
- Post town: LUDLOW
- Postcode district: SY8
- Dialling code: 01584
- Police: West Mercia
- Fire: Shropshire
- Ambulance: West Midlands
- UK Parliament: Ludlow

Nash is a small village and civil parish located in Shropshire, England, situated south east of Ludlow and north of Tenbury Wells. The parish had a population of 305 at the 2001 census, increasing to 405 at the 2011 census. The civil parish includes the small village of Knowle.

== Government ==
The Parish Council was formed at the time when there was little difference to the people between the Church and the State. The parish was formed around the small village that was there and was centred on St Johns Baptist Church.

In the late 1800s the Church and State separated which resulted in a change of governance. Nash is now represented by the Nash Parish Council and the Church of England by the Parochial Church Council.

The Parish Council has most of the power which affect the local people and manages local amenities. As of 2012 Mr Jeffrey G. Boak is the representative for Nash Parish Council for the Ludlow and Clee Area Joint Committee.

== Transport & Services ==
The main way to get around Nash is via a motorised vehicle as the parish is in a remote area. The parish lies on the B4214 road which can be accessed via the A456 or A49. Tenbury Wells is the closest market town to Nash being 3.5 miles away and is the closest place where locals can go to shops and arrange accommodation for any visitors to the area. Ludlow, 8 miles away, is the closest town where all the high street shops and big supermarkets are found. The nearest train station is Ludlow.

To save the local residents travelling to Tenbury Wells or Ludlow all the time the council has provided a village hall. Public transport and mobile library are no longer available in the locality.

=== Library ===
The nearest library is in Tenbury Wells which is 2.5 miles away

=== Village Hall ===
Local entertainment is by visiting the local pub or getting together at the village hall. In November 2010 the village hall got a grant for a table tennis table to be installed.

== Mahorall Farm ==
Mahorall is a family run farm in Nash, south of Ludlow. The farm can be dated back to 1650 when it was originally used for mixed farming. Over the years the farm has been placed in different ownerships and facilitated different types of farming.

The farm was originally part of a group of a country estate consisting of 16 farms that all specialised in their own area of farming. Mahorall was built to specialise in livestock and horses. In 1825 an external building was constructed on the side of the farm building to create stables, a workshop, a granary and fodder storage.

In the late 1960s the farm was converted into a dairy farm, but was short lived as the dairy industry collapsed. The farm has since undergone extensive repair work and in 2000 the King-Turner family opened it as a cider farm and nature reserve.

The farm which covers 14 acres not only produces local cider but also hosts a range of activities for visitors and the local community.

=== Hawkeye Falconry ===
Mahorall Farm Cider and Hawkeye Falconry have joined together to offer visitors a day's experience with Falcons. Groups of 3 to 8 people will spend the day from 10.00am – 4.00pm getting close to the falcons and going on a Hawk walk through the farms landscape.

=== Nature Trail ===
In 2006 the Heritage lottery gave Mahorall Farm a grant to build a nature trail on the land. The walk is free for everyone and takes approximately an hour to complete. The walk passes through 12 acres of wildlife, streams, woodland, orchards and open pastures. Three rare Exmoor ponies live on the land which the walk passes through.

=== Food Fayres ===
Mahorall Farm Cider attend local food and drink fayres throughout the year promoting and selling locally brewed cider.

== St John the Baptist Church ==
The church of St John the Baptist, Nash, dates back to the early 14th century with Norman windows in the tower dating back to 1066 – 1154. The church was originally used as a chapel for the ease of Burford, until in 1849 when it became a church in its own right. A north aisle was added to the building in 1865 after it became a church.

The parish war memorial is in the form of marble steps to the high altar, which list names of the dead of both World Wars and bears the text: I saw under the altar the souls of them that were slain for the testimony which they held (Book of Revelation, chapter 6 verse 9). In the south wall is a stained glass window in memory of Major Sir Robert Dalrymple Arbuthnot, killed during Operation Goodwood in Normandy in 1944. There is also a First World War Roll of Remembrance listing local men who served in World War I.

An old wooden vertical south dial still exists on the exterior of the church showing hours from VI to VI.

Politician Edward Brocklehurst Fielden (1857–1942), who lived at Court of Hill from 1926 to his death, is buried in the churchyard.

The church regularly holds community social events for the local people such as strawberry teas to beetle drives.

== Court of Hill ==
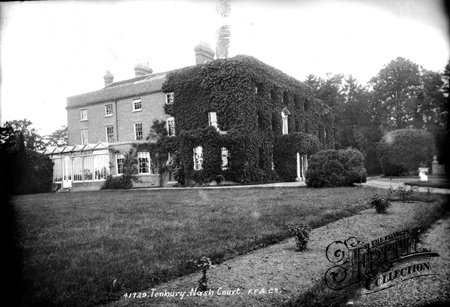
Nash Court

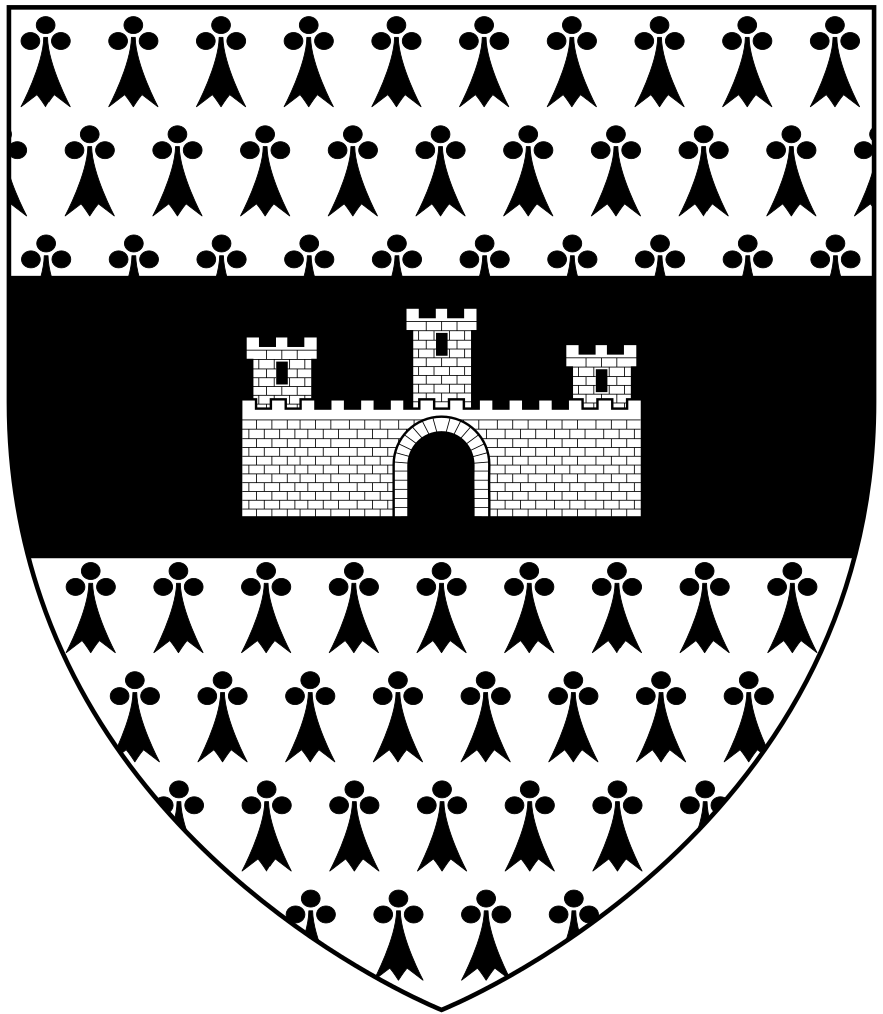
Arms of Hill "of Hill's Court, Shropshire": Ermine, on a fesse sable a castle triple towered argent. Today borne by Viscount Hill

"Court of Hill" (alias "Hill's Court") is an historic estate within the parish of Nash, long a seat of the Hill family. The surviving mansion house is a grade II* listed building of mediaeval origins, rebuilt in 1683 with alterations in the early 19th century and in 1927. The house is two storeys high with an attic. Over the south entrance door is an inscribed stone tablet above which are displayed the arms of Hill (Ermine, on a fesse sable a castle triple towered argent), dated 1683. These are the arms of Andrew Hill, who rebuilt the house in that year, and they impale the arms of Powys, for his wife Anne Powys of Henley near Ludlow. In 1946 nearby Nash Court was converted into a residential school by a local headmaster Henry Lucas Oakly. The National Association of Boys Club took over the building in 1948 and turned it into a training base and camp site. The building was then converted back to a school in the 1970s and became part of the Fishmoor Hall Schools group and had a sister school called Hallow Park school for girls. It became a school for boys all over the country who needed discipline. The school was closed in December 1991.

Following the Historic Buildings and Ancient Monuments Act of 1953, the building was listed on 12 November 1954.

Beatrice Hill-Lowe (1869-1950), archery Bronze medallist at the 1908 Summer Olympics, lived at Court of Hill while married to her first husband between 1891 and 1910.

== See also ==
- Listed buildings in Nash, South Shropshire
