= West Little River, Florida =

CDP in Miami-Dade County, Florida, US

- Census-designated place
- Location in Miami-Dade County and the state of Florida

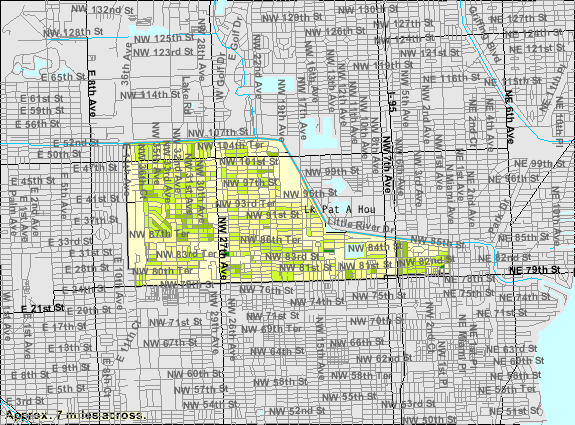
- U.S. Census Bureau map showing CDP boundaries
- Coordinates: 25°51′28″N 80°14′42″W
- Country: United States
- State: Florida
- County: Miami-Dade

Area
  - Total: 4.66 sq mi (12.07 km^{2})
  - Land: 4.59 sq mi (11.88 km^{2})
  - Water: 0.073 sq mi (0.19 km^{2})
- Elevation: 7 ft (2.1 m)

Population (2020)
  - Total: 34,128
  - Density: 7,441.7/sq mi (2,873.24/km^{2})
- Time zone: UTC-5 (Eastern (EST))
  - Summer (DST): UTC-4 (EDT)
- ZIP Codes: 33147, 33150 (Miami)
- Area codes: 305, 786, 645
- FIPS code: 12-76487
- GNIS feature ID: 2403006

West Little River is a census-designated place (CDP) in Miami-Dade County, Florida, United States. It is part of the Miami metropolitan area of South Florida. The population was 34,128 at the 2020 census.

Most of West Little River was originally a neighborhood of the city of Miami when it was annexed into the city in 1925. With the arrival of the Great Depression, Miami gave up its jurisdiction and West Little River became an unincorporated area of Miami-Dade County.

== Geography ==
West Little River is located 9 miles (14 km) north-northwest of downtown Miami. It is bordered by Westview to the north, Pinewood and El Portal to the east, Hialeah to the west, and Gladeview and the Miami neighborhood of Liberty City to the south.

According to the United States Census Bureau, the West Little River CDP has a total area of 4.7 square miles (12 km^{2}), of which, 4.6 square miles (12 km^{2}) are land and 0.1 square miles (0.26 km^{2}), or 1.59%, is water. The Little River Canal forms the northeast border of the CDP.

== Demographics ==
Historical population
Census	Pop.	Note	%±
1980	32,492		—
1990	33,575		3.3%
2000	32,498		−3.2%
2010	34,699		6.8%
2020	34,128		−1.6%

=== Racial and ethnic composition ===
West Little River CDP, Florida – Racial and ethnic composition Note: the US Census treats Hispanic/Latino as an ethnic category. This table excludes Latinos from the racial categories and assigns them to a separate category. Hispanics/Latinos may be of any race.
Race / Ethnicity (NH = Non-Hispanic)	Pop 2000	Pop 2010	Pop 2020	% 2000	% 2010	% 2020
White alone (NH)	1,089	909	874	3.35%	2.62%	2.56%
Black or African American alone (NH)	17,819	15,929	12,910	54.83%	45.91%	37.83%
Native American or Alaska Native alone (NH)	32	27	5	0.10%	0.08%	0.07%
Asian alone (NH)	37	37	52	0.11%	0.11%	0.15%
Pacific Islander or Native Hawaiian alone (NH)	21	7	5	0.06%	0.02%	0.01%
Other race alone (NH)	38	30	141	0.12%	0.09%	0.41%
Mixed race or Multiracial (NH)	446	210	360	1.37%	0.61%	1.05%
Hispanic or Latino (any race)	13,016	17,550	19,761	40.05%	50.58%	57.90%
Total	32,498	34,699	34,128	100.00%	100.00%	100.00%

=== 2020 census ===
As of the 2020 census, West Little River had a population of 34,128. The median age was 41.8 years. 19.7% of residents were under the age of 18 and 17.7% of residents were 65 years of age or older. For every 100 females there were 98.7 males, and for every 100 females age 18 and over there were 97.8 males age 18 and over.

100.0% of residents lived in urban areas, while 0.0% lived in rural areas.

There were 10,670 households in West Little River, of which 33.7% had children under the age of 18 living in them. Of all households, 34.2% were married-couple households, 21.9% were households with a male householder and no spouse or partner present, and 36.1% were households with a female householder and no spouse or partner present. About 19.8% of all households were made up of individuals and 8.4% had someone living alone who was 65 years of age or older.

There were 11,230 housing units, of which 5.0% were vacant. The homeowner vacancy rate was 1.1% and the rental vacancy rate was 4.8%.

Racial composition as of the 2020 census
Race	Number	Percent
White	5,849	17.1%
Black or African American	13,439	39.4%
American Indian and Alaska Native	156	0.5%
Asian	60	0.2%
Native Hawaiian and Other Pacific Islander	7	0.0%
Some other race	4,724	13.8%
Two or more races	9,893	29.0%
Hispanic or Latino (of any race)	19,761	57.9%

=== 2010 census ===
As of the 2010 United States census, there were 34,699 people, 9,651 households, and 7,063 families residing in the CDP.

=== 2000 census ===
As of the census of 2000, there were 32,498 people, 9,519 households, and 7,386 families residing in the CDP. The population density was 7,093.3 people per square mile (2,739.6/km^{2}). There were 10,298 housing units at an average density of 2,247.7/sq mi (868.1/km^{2}). The racial makeup of the CDP was 32.53% White (3.4% were Non-Hispanic White), 57.22% African American, 0.26% Native American, 0.18% Asian, 0.07% Pacific Islander, 5.49% from other races, and 4.25% from two or more races. Hispanic or Latino of any race were 40.05% of the population.

As of 2000, there were 9,519 households out of which 33.5% had children under the age of 18 living with them, 41.7% were married couples living together, 27.2% had a female householder with no husband present, and 22.4% were non-families. 17.5% of all households were made up of individuals and 6.9% had someone living alone who was 65 years of age or older. The average household size was 3.39 and the average family size was 3.75.

In 2000, in the CDP the population was spread out with 28.3% under the age of 18, 10.2% from 18 to 24, 27.4% from 25 to 44, 22.6% from 45 to 64, and 11.4% who were 65 years of age or older. The median age was 34 years. For every 100 females there were 95.8 males. For every 100 females age 18 and over, there were 92.5 males.

In 2000, the median income for a household in the CDP was $26,686, and the median income for a family was $29,013. Males had a median income of $22,058 versus $20,524 for females. The per capita income for the CDP was $12,026. About 24.7% of families and 29.0% of the population were below the poverty line, including 38.6% of those under age 18 and 28.8% of those age 65 or over.

As of 2000, speakers of English as a first language accounted for 53.61% of residents, Spanish speakers made up 41.21%, and French Creole was the mother tongue of 4.93% of the population.

== Government and infrastructure ==
The Miami-Dade Police Department operates the Northside District Station in West Little River.

== Education ==
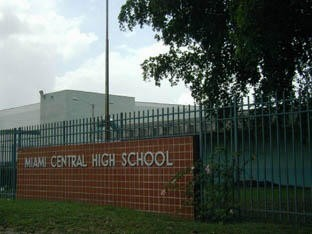
Miami Central High School

Miami-Dade County Public Schools operates area public schools:

=== Elementary schools ===
- Broadmoor Elementary School
- Miami Park Elementary School
- Dr. Henry W. Mack/West Little River Elementary School (formerly just West Little River Elementary School, but renamed in 2004 after adding the chairperson of the MDCPS audit committee to its name.)
- Arcola Lake Elementary School

=== Middle schools ===
- Madison Middle School

=== High schools ===
- Miami Central High School
- William H. Turner Technical Arts High School

=== Colleges and universities ===
- Miami-Dade College - North Campus (public college)

=== Libraries ===
Miami-Dade Public Library operates area public libraries:

- North Central Library

== Transportation ==
West Little River is served by Metrobus throughout the area, the Miami Metrorail, Tri-Rail, and Amtrak:

Metrorail:

- Northside (NW 79th Street and NW 32nd Avenue)
- Dr. Martin Luther King Jr. Plaza (NW 62nd Street and NW 27th Avenue)

Tri-Rail:

- Tri-Rail/Metrorail Transfer (NW 79th Street and NW 37th Avenue)

Amtrak:

- Amtrak-Miami: Silver Star and Silver Meteor service, (NW 79th Street and NW 37th Avenue)
