= Pinewood, Florida =

- Census-designated place
- Location in Miami-Dade County and the state of Florida

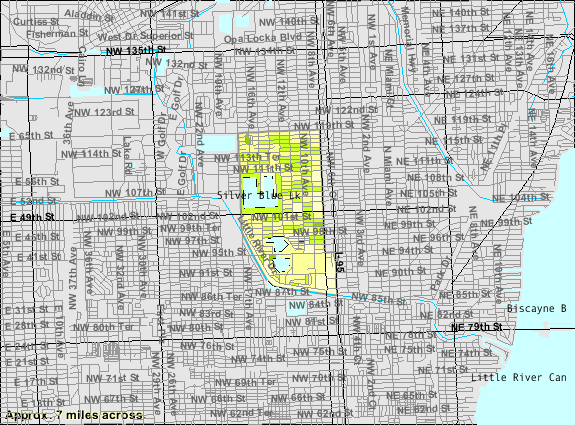
- U.S. Census Bureau map showing CDP boundaries
- Coordinates: 25°52′33″N 80°13′04″W
- Country: United States
- State: Florida
- County: Miami-Dade

Area
  - Total: 1.89 sq mi (4.90 km^{2})
  - Land: 1.75 sq mi (4.54 km^{2})
  - Water: 0.14 sq mi (0.36 km^{2})
- Elevation: 7 ft (2.1 m)

Population (2020)
  - Total: 17,246
- Time zone: UTC-5 (Eastern (EST))
  - Summer (DST): UTC-4 (EDT)
- ZIP Codes: 33147, 33150, 33167, 33168 (all - Miami)
- Area codes: 305, 786, 645
- FIPS code: 12-57250
- GNIS feature ID: 2403420

Pinewood is an unincorporated community and census-designated place (CDP) in Miami-Dade County, Florida, United States. It is part of the Miami metropolitan area of South Florida. The population was 17,246 at the 2020 census.

Most of Pinewood was originally a neighborhood of the City of Miami, annexed into the city in 1925. With the arrival of the Great Depression, Miami gave up its jurisdiction and Pinewood became an unincorporated area of Miami-Dade County.

== Geography ==
Pinewood is located 8 miles (13 km) north of downtown Miami. It is bordered to the north by the city of North Miami, to the east by Miami Shores and unincorporated neighborhoods, to the south and southwest by unincorporated West Little River, and to the northwest by unincorporated Westview. U.S. Route 441 (NW 7th Avenue) forms most of the eastern border of Pinewood.

According to the United States Census Bureau, the CDP has a total area of 1.9 square miles (4.9 km^{2}), of which 1.8 square miles (4.7 km^{2}) are land and 0.1 square miles (0.3 km^{2}), or 7.30%, are water.

== Demographics ==
Historical population
Census	Pop.	Note	%±
1980	16,252		—
1990	15,518		−4.5%
2000	16,523		6.5%
2010	16,520		0.0%
2020	17,246		4.4%
U.S. Decennial Census

=== Racial and ethnic composition ===
Pinewood CDP, Florida – Racial and ethnic composition Note: the US Census treats Hispanic/Latino as an ethnic category. This table excludes Latinos from the racial categories and assigns them to a separate category. Hispanics/Latinos may be of any race.
Race / Ethnicity (NH = Non-Hispanic)	Pop 2000	Pop 2010	Pop 2020	% 2000	% 2010	% 2020
White alone (NH)	588	368	385	3.56%	2.23%	2.23%
Black or African American alone (NH)	11,434	11,995	11,398	69.20%	72.61%	66.09%
Native American or Alaska Native alone (NH)	21	27	10	0.13%	0.16%	0.06%
Asian alone (NH)	50	77	43	0.30%	0.47%	0.25%
Native Hawaiian or Pacific Islander alone (NH)	5	7	1	0.03%	0.04%	0.01%
Other race alone (NH)	24	50	66	0.15%	0.30%	0.38%
Mixed race or Multiracial (NH)	626	235	269	3.79%	1.42%	1.56%
Hispanic or Latino (any race)	3,775	3,761	5,074	22.85%	22.77%	29.42%
Total	16,523	16,520	17,246	100.00%	100.00%	100.00%

=== 2020 census ===
As of the 2020 census, Pinewood had a population of 17,246. The median age was 37.7 years. 23.4% of residents were under the age of 18 and 16.2% were 65 years of age or older. For every 100 females, there were 92.2 males, and for every 100 females age 18 and over, there were 87.8 males.

100.0% of residents lived in urban areas, while 0.0% lived in rural areas.

There were 5,594 households in Pinewood, of which 36.4% had children under the age of 18 living in them. Of all households, 32.2% were married-couple households, 21.5% were households with a male householder and no spouse or partner present, and 39.4% were households with a female householder and no spouse or partner present. About 23.8% of all households were made up of individuals, and 9.5% had someone living alone who was 65 years of age or older.

There were 5,836 housing units, of which 4.1% were vacant. The homeowner vacancy rate was 1.1%, and the rental vacancy rate was 3.5%.

=== Demographic estimates ===
The 2020 American Community Survey 5-year estimates reported 3,565 families residing in the CDP.

=== 2010 census ===
As of the 2010 United States census, there were 16,520 people, 5,075 households, and 3,479 families residing in the CDP.

=== 2000 census ===
As of the 2000 census, there were 16,523 people, 5,029 households, and 3,686 families residing in the CDP. The population density was 9,621.4 inhabitants per square mile (3,714.8/km^{2}). There were 5,329 housing units at an average density of 3,103.1 per square mile (1,198.1/km^{2}). The racial makeup of the CDP was 19.26% White (3.6% were Non-Hispanic White), 71.05% African American, 0.25% Native American, 0.33% Asian, 0.03% Pacific Islander, 3.59% from other races, and 5.50% from two or more races. Hispanic or Latino of any race were 22.85% of the population.

As of 2000, there were 5,029 households, out of which 41.0% had children under the age of 18 living with them, 36.3% were married couples living together, 28.5% had a female householder with no husband present, and 26.7% were non-families. 21.7% of all households were made up of individuals, and 6.9% had someone living alone who was 65 years of age or older. The average household size was 3.25 and the average family size was 3.77.

In 2000, in the CDP, the population was spread out, with 32.1% under the age of 18, 11.2% from 18 to 24, 26.6% from 25 to 44, 21.2% from 45 to 64, and 8.9% who were 65 years of age or older. The median age was 30 years. For every 100 females, there were 92.6 males. For every 100 females age 18 and over, there were 88.9 males.

In 2000, the median income for a household in the CDP was $24,949, and the median income for a family was $26,548. Males had a median income of $22,439 versus $18,046 for females. The per capita income for the CDP was $10,169. About 30.2% of families and 33.5% of the population were below the poverty line, including 45.9% of those under age 18 and 21.2% of those age 65 or over.

As of 2000, speakers of English as a first language accounted for 47.40% of residents, while French Creole made up 28.93%, Spanish was at 22.09%, and French was the mother tongue of 1.56% of the population.
