= Knol (disambiguation) =

Knol, or KNOL may refer to:

- Knol, a defunct reference site by Google
- KNOL (FM), a radio station (107.5 FM) licensed to serve Jean Lafitte, Louisiana, United States
- KNOL, NASDAQ ticker code for Knology

== People ==
=== Surname ===
- Ankie Broekers-Knol (born 1946), Dutch politician and government minister, president of the Dutch Senate 2013–2019
- Enzo Knol (born 1993), Dutch video blogger and YouTuber
- Janny Knol (born 1969), Dutch police officer
- Monique Knol (born 1964), Dutch cyclist
- Ruud Knol (born 1981), Dutch football player
- Tim Knol (born 1989), Dutch singer-songwriter

== See also ==
- Knoll (disambiguation)
