= Knowle =

Knowle may refer to:

== Places in England ==
- Knowle, Bristol, a district and council ward of Bristol
- Knowle West, a neighbourhood in the south of Bristol, adjacent to Knowle
- Knowle, Devon, a village in Braunton parish
- Knowle, Budleigh Salterton, a location in Devon
- Knowle, Copplestone, a location in Devon
- Knowle, Cullompton, a location in Devon
- Knowle, Hampshire, a village
  - Knowle Halt railway station
- Knowle, Shropshire, a village
- Knowle, West Midlands, a village
  - Knowle F.C., a football club
- Knowle St Giles, village and parish in Somerset

== People with the surname ==
- Julian Knowle (born 1974), Austrian tennis player

== See also ==
- Knole, the estate at Sevenoaks in Kent now owned by the National Trust
- Knowle Hill
- Knowle Stadium
- Knowles (disambiguation)
- Knoll (disambiguation)
- Noel (disambiguation)
- Nowell (disambiguation)
