= Hans Noll =

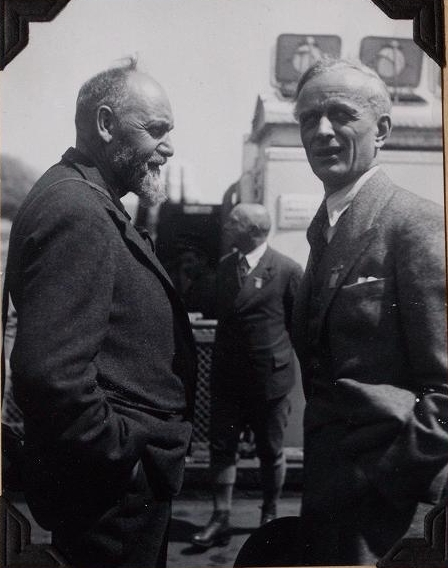
- Noll with Erwin Stresemann in 1954
- Born: 30 January 1885; Burgdorf, Switzerland
- Died: 14 July 1969 (aged 84)
- Education: University of Zurich; University of Basel; University of Geneva
- Occupations: Ornithologist; educator; author
- Spouse: Luise Tobler

Hans Noll or Hans Noll-Tobler (30 January 1885 – 14 July 1969) was a Swiss ornithologist, school teacher, and author of several books on birds and popular articles. He also made educational films on the lives of birds.

Noll was born in Burgdorf and was educated at the Universities of Zurich, Basel and Geneva. He then became a Gymnasium teacher at a rural education centre in Kaltbrunn from 1907 to 1919. Here he also studied the birds of the region. He was a cofounder of the Sempach bird research centre and the Swiss Society for the Study of Birds and their Protection (ALA – Schweizerische Gesellschaft für Vogelkunde und Vogelschutz) in 1909. He wrote a book Sumpfvogelleben (1924) for which he received a doctorate in 1925 honoris cause from the University of Basel. He made special studies of water birds at the Untersee.

Noll was married to Luise née Tobler. Together they were involved in setting up the Schaffhausen orphanage.
