= Ben Nowell =

- Born: Ben Nowell; 9 November 1985 (age 41) Christchurch, New Zealand
- Height: 1.85 m (6 ft 1 in)
- Weight: 92 kg (14 st 7 lb)

Rugby union career
- Position: Utility Back
International career
Years	Team	Apps	(Points)
2008	New Zealand Sevens		

Ben Nowell is a New Zealand Rugby union player who plays for the New Zealand Sevens team.

== Career highlights ==
- New Zealand Sevens 2007–present
- Crusaders wider training squad 2007, 2008
- Canterbury Sevens 2007, 2008
- Canterbury A 2005–2007
- Canterbury Colts 2005
