= Jack Noel =

Australian cricketer

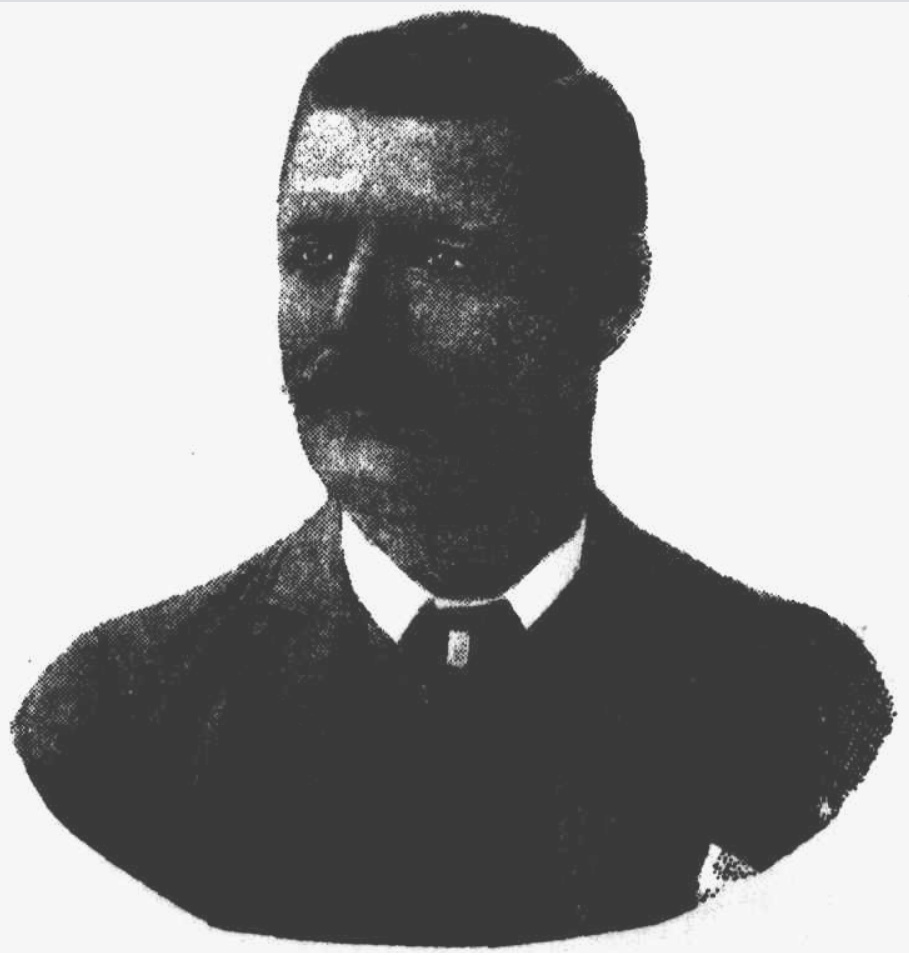

Personal information
- Full name: John Noel
- Born: 28 March 1856; Hindmarsh, Adelaide, South Australia
- Died: 9 January 1938 (aged 81); Largs Bay, Adelaide, South Australia
- Batting: Right-handed
- Bowling: Right-arm
- Role: All-rounder, occasional wicket-keeper

Domestic team information
- Years: Team
- 1880-81 to 1894-95: South Australia

Career statistics
Competition	First-class
Matches	16
Runs scored	326
Batting average	12.53
100s/50s	0/2
Top score	61
Balls bowled	1605
Wickets	14
Bowling average	39.92
5 wickets in innings	0
10 wickets in match	0
Best bowling	3/43
Catches/stumpings	10/1
- Source: Cricinfo, 1 August 2019

John Noel (28 March 1856 – 9 January 1938) was a cricketer who played first-class cricket for South Australia from 1880 to 1895.

Jack Noel was principally a batsman, but he was also a useful bowler and wicket-keeper and excellent fieldsman, who early in his career came close to selection for the national team. Opening the batting in his second first-class match he made South Australia's top score of 52 in a loss to Victoria in 1880–81. He made the highest score on either side in the corresponding match the next season when he scored 61 and South Australia won. In 1882–83, when South Australia were dismissed for 23 by Victoria, he opened once again and made 18. Thereafter he was less successful, and batted down the order.

Noel played cricket for Port Adelaide until he was 60, and also played Australian rules football for Port Adelaide. He lived all his life in Port Adelaide.

Noel worked from 1880 to 1937 as a customs and shipping representative for G. Wood, Son and Co. in Port Adelaide. He died in 1938 at the age of 81, leaving a widow and a daughter.
