= Michael Knoll =

Professor Michael Knoll
- Title: Theodore K. Warner Professor of Law & Professor of Real Estate; Co-Director of the Center for Tax Law and Policy; Deputy Dean

Academic background
- Education: University of Chicago (AM 1980, PhD in economics 1983); University of Chicago Law School (JD 1984)

Academic work
- Institutions: University of Pennsylvania Law School

Michael Knoll is the Theodore K. Warner Professor of Law & Professor of Real Estate at the University of Pennsylvania Law School, Co-Director of the Center for Tax Law and Policy, and the Deputy Dean.

== Biography ==
He earned an AM from the University of Chicago in 1980, a PhD in economics from the University of Chicago in 1983, and a JD from the University of Chicago Law School in 1984. He was a Law Clerk to Judge Alex Kozinski of the United States Court of Appeals for the Ninth Circuit in 1986.

Knoll is the Theodore K. Warner Professor of Law & Professor of Real Estate at the University of Pennsylvania Law School, Co-Director of the Center for Tax Law and Policy and the Deputy Dean.

Among his many articles are "The Connection between Competitiveness and International Taxation," 65 Tax Law Review 349 (2012), “Reconsidering International Tax Neutrality,” 64 Tax Law Review 99 (2011), and “The Corporate Income Tax and the Competitiveness of U.S. Industries,” 63 Tax Law Review 771 (2010).
