= Westview, Florida =

- Census-designated place
- Location in Miami-Dade County and the state of Florida

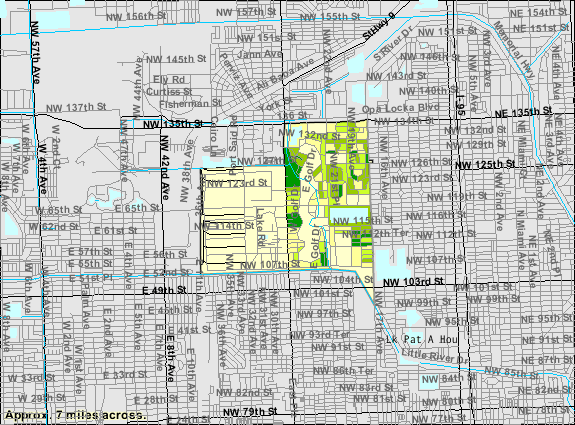
- U.S. Census Bureau map showing CDP boundaries
- Coordinates: 25°52′42″N 80°14′47″W
- Country: United States
- State: Florida
- County: Miami-Dade

Area
  - Total: 3.19 sq mi (8.25 km^{2})
  - Land: 3.03 sq mi (7.84 km^{2})
  - Water: 0.16 sq mi (0.41 km^{2})
- Elevation: 7 ft (2.1 m)

Population (2020)
  - Total: 9,923
  - Density: 3,279.2/sq mi (1,266.1/km^{2})
- Time zone: UTC-5 (Eastern (EST))
  - Summer (DST): UTC-4 (EDT)
- ZIP Code: 33167 (Miami)
- Area codes: 305, 786, 645
- FIPS code: 12-76950
- GNIS feature ID: 2403016

Westview is a census-designated place (CDP) in Miami-Dade County, Florida, United States. It is part of the Miami metropolitan area of South Florida. The population was 9,923 at the 2020 census.

== Geography ==
Westview is located 11 miles (18 km) north-northwest of downtown Miami. It is bordered to the north and northwest by Opa-locka, to the northeast by North Miami, to the southeast by Pinewood, to the south by West Little River, and to the west by Hialeah.

According to the United States Census Bureau, the CDP has a total area of 3.2 square miles (8.3 km^{2}), of which 3.0 square miles (7.8 km^{2}) are land and 0.2 square miles (0.52 km^{2}), or 5.02%, are water.

== Demographics ==
Historical population
Census	Pop.	Note	%±
2000	9,692		—
2010	9,650		−0.4%
2020	9,923		2.8%
U.S. Decennial Census; 2010 2020

=== Racial and ethnic composition ===
Westview CDP, Florida – Racial and ethnic composition Note: the US Census treats Hispanic/Latino as an ethnic category. This table excludes Latinos from the racial categories and assigns them to a separate category. Hispanics/Latinos may be of any race.
Race / Ethnicity (NH = Non-Hispanic)	Pop 2000	Pop 2010	Pop 2020	% 2000	% 2010	% 2020
White alone (NH)	381	226	217	3.93%	2.34%	2.19%
Black or African American alone (NH)	7,124	6,414	5,586	73.50%	66.47%	56.29%
Native American or Alaska Native alone (NH)	28	16	4	0.29%	0.17%	0.04%
Asian alone (NH)	38	18	18	0.39%	0.19%	0.18%
Native Hawaiian or Pacific Islander alone (NH)	13	5	0	0.13%	0.05%	0.00%
Other race alone (NH)	10	9	67	0.10%	0.09%	0.68%
Mixed race or Multiracial (NH)	183	103	133	1.89%	1.07%	1.34%
Hispanic or Latino (any race)	1,915	2,859	3,898	19.76%	29.63%	39.28%
Total	9,692	9,650	9,923	100.00%	100.00%	100.00%

=== 2020 census ===
As of the 2020 census, Westview had a population of 9,923. The median age was 40.7 years. 22.0% of residents were under the age of 18 and 20.4% of residents were 65 years of age or older. For every 100 females there were 89.8 males, and for every 100 females age 18 and over there were 85.9 males age 18 and over.

100.0% of residents lived in urban areas, while 0.0% lived in rural areas.

There were 3,242 households in Westview, of which 34.1% had children under the age of 18 living in them. Of all households, 33.0% were married-couple households, 18.1% were households with a male householder and no spouse or partner present, and 42.2% were households with a female householder and no spouse or partner present. About 22.6% of all households were made up of individuals and 12.8% had someone living alone who was 65 years of age or older.

There were 3,360 housing units, of which 3.5% were vacant. The homeowner vacancy rate was 0.7% and the rental vacancy rate was 4.2%.

=== Demographic estimates ===
In the 2016–2020 American Community Survey 5-year estimates, there were 2,782 families residing in the CDP.

=== 2010 census ===
As of the 2010 United States census, there were 9,650 people, 2,923 households, and 2,170 families residing in the CDP.

=== 2000 census ===
At the 2000 census there were 9,692 people, 2,914 households, and 2,235 families living in the CDP. The population density was 3,109.2 inhabitants per square mile (1,200.5/km^{2}). There were 3,111 housing units at an average density of 998.0 per square mile (385.3/km^{2}). The racial makeup of the CDP was 17.01% White (3.9% were Non-Hispanic White), 75.63% Black or African American, 0.43% Native American, 0.41% Asian, 0.13% Pacific Islander, 3.01% from other races, and 3.36% from two or more races. Hispanic or Latino of any race were 19.76%.

As of 2000, there were 2,914 households 37.6% had children under the age of 18 living with them, 37.1% were married couples living together, 31.4% had a female householder with no husband present, and 23.3% were non-families. 19.0% of households were one person and 7.7% were one person aged 65 or older. The average household size was 3.32 and the average family size was 3.74.

In 2000, the age distribution was 31.2% under the age of 18, 11.1% from 18 to 24, 25.6% from 25 to 44, 22.6% from 45 to 64, and 9.5% 65 or older. The median age was 31 years. For every 100 females, there were 88.2 males. For every 100 females age 18 and over, there were 81.4 males.

In 2000, the median household income was $28,943 and the median family income was $31,289. Males had a median income of $23,052 versus $22,933 for females. The per capita income for the CDP was $11,887. About 23.2% of families and 26.0% of the population were below the poverty line, including 32.4% of those under age 18 and 24.9% of those age 65 or over.

As of 2000, speakers of English as a first language accounted for 68.37% of residents, while Spanish made up 20.61%, French Creole was at 10.16%, and French was the mother tongue of 0.84% of the population.
