= Kirstead Green =

Village in Norfolk, England

Coordinates: 52.52345°N 1.38012°E

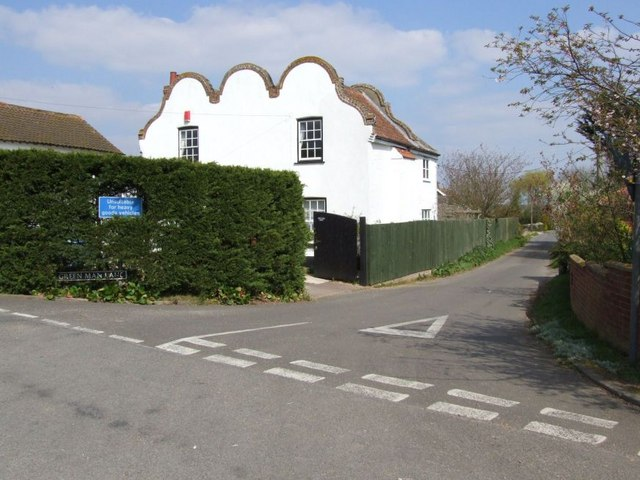
- A house on Green Man Lane

- Location within Norfolk
- OS grid reference: TM294971
- Civil parish: Kirstead
- District: South Norfolk
- Shire county: Norfolk
- Region: East
- Country: England
- Sovereign state: United Kingdom
- Post town: Norwich
- Postcode district: NR15
- Dialling code: 01508
- UK Parliament: South Norfolk

Kirstead Green is a village in the English county of Norfolk.

Kirstead Green is located 5.7 miles (9.2 km) north of Beccles and 7.7 miles (12.4 km) south-east of Norwich.

== History ==
Kirstead's name is of Viking origin and derives from the Old Norse for the green of the church steading.

In the Domesday Book, Kirstead Green is listed alongside Kirstead.

== Governance ==
Kirstead Green is part of the electoral ward of Brooke for local elections and is part of the district of South Norfolk.

The village's national constituency is South Norfolk which has been represented by the Labour's Ben Goldsborough MP since 2024.
