= Knightor =

Coordinates: 50.371°N 4.766°W

- Location within Cornwall
- OS grid reference: SX034560
- Civil parish: Treverbyn
- Unitary authority: Cornwall
- Ceremonial county: Cornwall
- Region: South West
- Country: England
- Sovereign state: United Kingdom
- Post town: St Austell
- Postcode district: PL26

Knightor is a hamlet in the parish of Treverbyn, Cornwall, England.
