= Gerard Noel =

Gerard Noel may refer to:

- Sir Gerard Noel, 2nd Baronet (1759–1838), British MP
- Gerard Noel (politician) (1823–1911), British MP
- Gerard Noel (Royal Navy officer) (1845–1918), Royal Navy admiral of the fleet
- Gerard Noel (editor) (1926–2016), fellow of the Royal Society of Literature
- Gerard Noel (Wiccan), co-founder of the Witchcraft Research Association
- Gerard Thomas Noel (1782–1851), English cleric, son of the 2nd Baronet
