= Knowle, Shropshire =

Coordinates: 52.365°N 2.594°W

Knowle
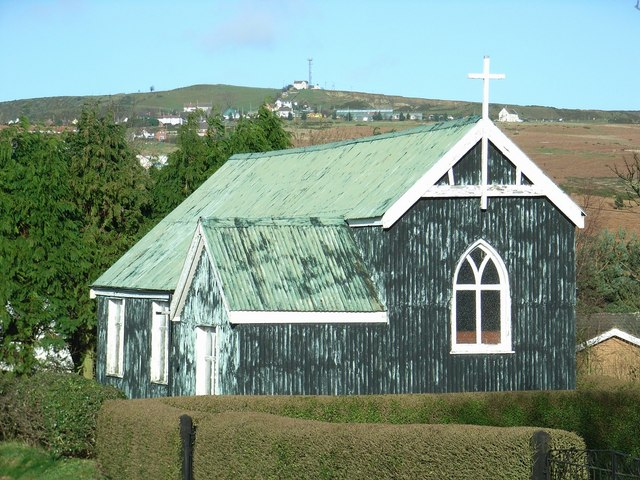
- Knowle Church

- Location within Shropshire
- OS grid reference: SO595743
- Civil parish: Nash
- Unitary authority: Shropshire
- Ceremonial county: Shropshire
- Region: West Midlands
- Country: England
- Sovereign state: United Kingdom
- Post town: LUDLOW
- Postcode district: SY8
- Dialling code: 01584
- Police: West Mercia
- Fire: Shropshire
- Ambulance: West Midlands
- UK Parliament: Ludlow

Knowle is a small village in Shropshire, England. It lies largely in the civil parish of Nash.

It is 0.7 miles (1.1 km) south of the larger village of Cleehill (which has a primary school, two pubs and several shops) on the B4214 road to Tenbury Wells.

The football club "Clee Hill United" play their home games at Knowle Sports Ground, the highest venue in the Mercian Regional Football League at an elevation of 935–950 feet (285-290m).
