= Grassy Knoll (disambiguation) =

Grassy Knoll may refer to:

- A knoll with a considerable amount of grass growing on it.
- Grassy knoll, a small hill on Dealey Plaza, Dallas, USA
- The Grassy Knoll (band), an American instrumental music group
- Grassy Knoll (album), an album by New Zealand band The Exponents
- Tal's Hill, a former hill known as the Grassy Knoll
