= Noelle =

Noelle or Noëlle
- Pronunciation: English: /noʊˈɛl/ noh-EL; French: [nɔɛl]
- Gender: Female

Origin
- Origin: Latin and Old French
- Meaning: Christmas
- Region of origin: France

Other names
- Variant forms: Noella, Noelie, Noeline
- Related names: Noel

Noelle or Noëlle is the feminine form of the unisex name Noel. It derives from the old French Noël, "Christmas," a variant (and later a replacement) of nael, which itself derives from the Latin natalis, "birthday". Other nicknames and variations for girls named Noelle include Noèle, Noële, Noelia, Noeline, Noelie, Noela, Noell, Noella, Noelene, and Noeleen.

== Given name ==
People with the name include:

=== Noelle ===
- Noelle Barahona (born 1990), Chilean alpine skier
- Noelle Barker (1928–2013), British soprano singer and singing teacher
- Noelle Bassi (born 1983), American butterfly swimmer
- Noelle Beck (born 1968), American actress
- Noelle Freeman (born 1989), American beauty pageant titleholder
- Noelle Kahaian, American politician
- Noelle Kahanu, native Hawaiian academic, curator, writer, and lawyer
- Noelle Kennedy, Irish camogie player
- Noelle Kocot (born 1969), American poet
- Noelle Lambert (born 1997), American Paralympian track and field athlete and a motivational speaker
- Noelle Lenihan (born 1999), Irish paralympic discus thrower
- Noelle Malkamaki (born 2001), American Paralympic athlete
- Noelle Maritz (born 1995), Swiss football defender
- Noelle McCarthy (born 1978 or 1979), Irish-New Zealand writer and broadcaster
- Noelle Middleton (1926–2016), Irish actress
- Noelle Montcalm (born 1988), Canadian athlete specialising in the 400 metres hurdles
- Noelle Murray (born 1989), Irish footballer
- Noelle Pikus-Pace (born 1982), American skeleton racer
- Noelle Porter (born 1970), American former professional tennis player
- Noelle Quinn (born 1985), American basketball player
- Noelle Reno (born 1983), American fashion entrepreneur, television presenter, socialite, and model
- Noelle Sabbe, French racing cyclist
- Noelle Salazar, American author of historical fiction
- Noelle Sandwith (1927–2006), English artist
- Noelle Scaggs (born 1979), American singer-songwriter
- Noelle Stockwood (born 2003), founding member and lead singer of Femtanyl
- Noelle Valdivia, American television writer and playwright
- Noelle Vial (1959–2003), Irish poet
- Noelle Wenceslao (born 1979), Filipina mountaineer, adventurer, and coast guard officer

=== Noëlle ===
- Noëlle Amouzoun (born 1998), Beninese footballer
- Noëlle Boisson (born 1944), French film editor
- Noëlle Châtelet (born 1944), French writer and lecturer
- Noëlle Cordier (born 1944), French singer
- Noëlle Lenoir (born 1948), French stateswoman
- Noëlle van Lottum (born 1972), Dutch tennis player
- Noëlle Norman (1921–1985), French film actress
- Noëlle Revaz (born 1968), Swiss author
- Noëlle Roger (1874–1953), Swiss writer in French
- Noëlle Roorda (born 2000), Dutch Paralympic athlete

=== Noele ===
- Noele Gordon (1919–1985), British actress

=== Fictional characters ===
- Noelle, a playable character in the visual novel series Butterfly Soup
- Noelle Silva, a character in the manga series Black Clover
- Noelle Holiday, a major character in the video game Deltarune

== Surname ==
- Amanda Noelle (born 1983), American Christian musician and worship leader
- Annika Noelle (born 1986), American actress and model
- Nica Noelle, American entrepreneur, pornographic film actress and director

== See also ==
- Noel (given name)
- Noelia (disambiguation)
- Noell (disambiguation)
- Marie-Noëlle
- Noella
- Noelie
- Noeline
