= Noella =

Noella is a feminine given name. It is related to the name Noelle.

== People with the given name ==
- Noella Leduc (1933–2014), American baseball player
- Noella Marcellino (born 1951), American Benedictine nun
- Noella Sisterina (born 1997), Indonesian singer, presenter and former member of the idol group JKT48
- Noella Uloko (born 1989), Nigerian contemporary Christian singer-songwriter
- Noella Wiyaala (born 1986), Ghanaian Afro-pop singer-songwriter

== See also ==
- Noëlla Champagne (born 1944), Canadian politician from Quebec
- Noela
- Marie-Noëlle
- Noelle
- Noelie
- Noeline
- Noel (name)
- Nel (name)
