= Noal (disambiguation) =

Noal is a bairro in the Brazilian state of Rio Grande do Sul.

Noal or NOAL may also refer to:

- Noal (name)
- No'al, or HaNoar HaOved VeHaLomed, Israeli youth movement
- Northern Ohio Athletic League

== See also ==
- Noel (disambiguation)
