= Uloko =

Uloko is a surname. Notable people with the surname include:

- Benedict Uloko (born 1984), Nigerian weightlifter
- Noella Uloko (born 1989), Nigerian singer
- Ujah Uloko (born 1999), Nigerian footballer
