= Noeline =

Noeline is a feminine given name.

== People with the given name ==
- Noeline Alcorn, New Zealand education research academic
- Noeline Baker (1878–1958), New Zealand suffragist
- Noeline Brokenshire (1925–2022), New Zealand field hockey player and hurdler
- Noeline Brown, Australian actress and comedian
- Noeline Hofmann, Canadian country and western singer-songwriter
- Noeline Taurua, New Zealand netball player and coach
- Noeline Kisembo Basemera, Ugandan politician
- Noeline Colman, wife of the prime minister of New Zealand
- Noeline Mangel, fictional character from Neighbours

== See also ==
- Noella
- Noelia
- Noela
- Noelie
