= Marie-Noëlle =

Marie-Noëlle is a French language feminine name, composed of the names Marie and Noëlle. Notable people with the name include:

- Marie-Noëlle Ada (born 1990), Gabonese beauty pageant titleholder
- Marie-Noëlle Battistel (born 1956), French politician
- Marie-Noëlle Gibelli (born 1957), Monegasque politician
- Marie-Noëlle Koyara (born 1955), Minister of State of Defense of the Central African Republic
- Marie-Noëlle Lienemann (born 1951), French politician; Member of the European Parliament
- Marie-Noelle Marquis (born 1979), French-Canadian actress
- Marie-Noëlle Savigny (born 1957), French athlete who specialized in the 100 meters hurdles
- Marie-Noëlle Thémereau (born 1950), president of the government of New Caledonia
- Marie-Noëlle Warot-Fourdrignier, French footballer

== See also ==
- Marie-Noële Kelly (1901–1995), Belgian–born hostess and traveller
- Noelle
- Noella
