= Is There More to Life Than Dancing? =

1979 studio album by Noël

Studio album by Noël
- Released: 1979
- Recorded: 1979
- Studio: Larrabee Sound, Los Angeles
- Genre: Disco
- Length: 35:16
- Label: Virgin
- Producer: Ron Mael; Russell Mael

Noël chronology
| Is There More to Life Than Dancing? (1979) | Peer Pressure (1982) |

Singles from Is There More to Life Than Dancing?
- 1. "Dancing Is Dangerous" Released: 1979; 2. "I Want a Man" Released: 1979; 3. "The Night They Invented Love" / "Au Revoir" Released: 1979

Is There More to Life Than Dancing? is the debut album by the American singer Noël. It was released in 1979 by Virgin Records.

== Background, singles, and release ==
In 1979, Ron and Russell Mael as Sparks released their eighth album No. 1 in Heaven. Later that year, their label at the time, Virgin Records, released a record attributed to a singer known mononymously as Noël, written and produced by the Mael brothers. Their first album as producers, Is There More to Life Than Dancing? is a disco record that shares stylistic similarities with No. 1 in Heaven. It was recorded in 1979 at Larrabee Sound Studios in Los Angeles.

While promoting the 1979 single "Dancing Is Dangerous" in an interview for Cash Box, Noël revealed that the Maels discovered her while she was playing keyboards in a band in Los Angeles. (Note: Although an initial interview from Cash Box yielded that she was discovered while playing in a new wave group at Madame Wong's, Noël has since maintained that it was for a punk band called Mick Smiley at the Troubadour.) The song charted on Billboard's Dance Club Songs chart on no. 91. That year, Virgin released two more singles: "I Want a Man" and "The Night They Invented Love" with "Au Revoir".

== Re-release and music video ==
On April 20, 2024 (Record Store Day), Sparks re-released both No. 1 in Heaven and Is There More to Life Than Dancing? as a double LP set. On May 17 of the same year, both were also released on CD containing various bonus tracks, where the latter's liner notes were written by Noël.

Long considered lost was a music video for "Dancing Is Dangerous". According to an interview with Noël conducted by Ambar Navarro, who would later direct music videos for Sparks such as "Drowned in a Sea of Tears", after the documentary The Sparks Brothers created a renewed interest in the band (and by extension Noël), the Mael brothers sought to re-release both the album and the video, but the director, Micky Dolenz, did not possess the master tape. In actuality, Noël owned the tape. Coinciding with the album's release on streaming services, Sparks released the video, which was the first time it was shown to the public.

Although it did not chart upon its original release, the re-release of Is There More to Life Than Dancing? briefly entered the UK Independent and Scottish albums charts at no. 32 and 74, respectively.

== Critical reception ==
Retrospective ratings
Review scores
| Source | Rating |
|---|---|
| Classic Pop | 3.5/5 stars |

A contemporary review of Is There More To Life Than Dancing? in the Canadian magazine RPM said "the tracks might seem tedious at first and take some time to develop, but what lies within is curiously captivating and warrants a good objective listen."

Upon the album's re-release in 2024, Ian Wade of Classic Pop magazine called the album "A genuine curio – and one that you dance to", singling out "The Night They Invented Love" and "Au Revoir" as songs that could fit onto Sparks' No. 1 in Heaven.

== Legacy ==
Genesis P-Orridge said that they were listening to the "Dancing Is Dangerous" single and works by Cerrone around the time Throbbing Gristle was writing "Hot on the Heels of Love" for their album 20 Jazz Funk Greats (1979).

== Track listing ==
All tracks are written by Ron and Russell Mael.

Is There More to Life than Dancing? track listing
| No. | Title | Length |
|---|---|---|
| 1. | "Dancing Is Dangerous" | 9:45 |
| 2. | "Is There More to Life Than Dancing?" | 8:09 |
| 3. | "The Night They Invented Love" | 9:16 |
| 4. | "Au Revoir" | 3:10 |
| 5. | "I Want a Man" | 4:56 |
| Total length: | | 35:16 |

45th Anniversary Edition – CD 2
| No. | Title | Length |
|---|---|---|
| 1. | "I Just Want to Be Seen with You" | 4:53 |
| 2. | "My Night" | 3:56 |
| 3. | "I Never Want to Be a Mother" | 4:39 |
| 4. | "Dancing Is Dangerous" (part one) | 3:42 |
| 5. | "Dancing Is Dangerous" (part two) | 3:22 |
| 6. | "The Night They Invented Love" (single version) | 3:45 |
| 7. | "I Want a Man" (single version) | 3:33 |
| 8. | "Dancing Is Dangerous" (instrumental) | 3:49 |
| 9. | "I Just Want to Be Seen with You" (vocal guide version) | 4:21 |
| 10. | "I Never Want to Be a Mother / Au Revoir" (vocal guide version) | 8:07 |
| 11. | "Dancing Is Dangerous / Is There More to Life Than Dancing?" (vocal guide version) | 14:35 |
| Total length: | | 1:33:58 |

== Personnel ==
Credits are adapted from the CD liner notes.

- Noël – vocals
- Julia Waters, Maxine Waters, Oren Waters – backing vocals
- Paulinho da Costa – percussion
- Michael Brecker – saxophone
- Ron Mael – synthesizers

Technical and design

- Ron Mael, Russell Mael – production
- Bob Stone – engineering
- Gary Chang – synthesizer programming
- Jack Lorenz – photography
- Malcolm Garrett – commercial art

== Charts ==
=== Album ===
2024 re-release
| Chart (2024) | Peak position |
|---|---|
| Scottish Albums (OCC) | 74 |
| UK Independent Albums (OCC) | 32 |

=== Singles ===
"Dancing Is Dangerous"
| Chart (1979) | Peak position |
|---|---|
| US Dance Club Songs (Billboard) | 91 |
