= Noelie =

Noelie is a feminine given name. Alternative spellings include Noélie and Noëlie. People with the name include:

- Noelie McDonnell, Irish singer-songwriter
- Noélie Annette Lacour (born 2006), Gabonese swimmer
- Noélie Yarigo (born 1985), Beninese middle-distance runner
- Noëlie Pierront (1899–1988), French organist

== See also ==
- Noella
- Noelia
- Noela
- Noeline
