= Noelia (given name) =

Noelia is a feminine given name which may refer to:

- Noelia, Puerto Rican pop singer, songwriter and entrepreneur Noelia Lorenzo (born 1979)
- Noelia Artigas (born 1989), Uruguayan handball goalkeeper
- Noelia Aybar (born 1984), Spanish former footballer
- Noelia Barbeito (born 1981), Argentine politician and provincial senator
- Noelia Bermudez (born 1994), Costa Rican footballer
- Noelia Fernández (cyclist) (born 1978), Argentine former road cyclist
- Noelia Fernández (gymnast) (born 1976), Spanish former rhythmic gymnast and coach
- Noelia García (born 1992), Spanish football goalkeeper
- Noelia Gil (born 1994), Spanish football goalkeeper
- Noelia López (born 1986), Spanish model, winner of the second season of the Spanish TV contest Supermodelo 2007
- Noelia López (footballer) (born 1978), Argentine footballer
- Noelia García Martin (born 1973), Spanish swimmer who competed in the 2004 Paralympics
- Noelia Marzol (born 1986), Argentinian actress and businesswoman
- Noelia Núñez (born 1992), Spanish politician
- Noelia Oncina (born 1976), Spanish handball player who competed in the 2004 Olympics
- Noelia Pérez Peñate (born 1972), Spanish former tennis player
- Noelia Sala (born 1988), Argentine handball player
- Noelia Vera (born 1985), Spanish journalist and former politician
- Noelia Villegas (born 1996), Spanish footballer
- Noelia Voigt (born 1999), American pageant titleholder, Miss USA 2023
- Noelia Zeballos (born 1994), Bolivian tennis player

== See also ==
- Noelle
