= Under a Jarvis Moon =

2010 film by Heather Giugni

- Film poster
- Directed by: Noelle Kahanu and Heather Giugni
- Produced by: Noelle Kahanu, Heather Giugni, Lisa Altieri
- Edited by: Lisa Altieri
- Production company: Juniroa Productions
- Release date: October 17, 2010 (Hawaii Film Festival)
- Running time: 56 minutes
- Country: United States
- Language: English

Under a Jarvis Moon is a 2010 documentary film about the young men, mostly of Hawaiian origin, sent in the 1930s and 1940s to colonize the Line Island of Jarvis and the Phoenix Islands of Howland and Baker. Directed by Noelle Kahanu and Heather Giugni, the film is related to a 2002 Bishop Museum exhibition "Hui Panalāʻau: Hawaiian Colonists, American Citizens." In 2010 Hawaii International Film Festival, the film scored #1 in Best Documentary nomination.

== Description ==
The United States companies ran guano mining business in Jarvis Island during the mid-1800s, by using the Guano Act passed by Congress in 1856. Eventually the mines were exhausted, and the colonists left the island. Then Jarvis, Baker and Howland islands were claimed by Great Britain. However, it was unable to occupy the islands or find any use for them, so the British soon abandoned, too.

In 1935, the US Department of Air Commerce announced the need to reclaim the strategically located Line Islands, ostensibly to protect federal interests in commercial aviation routes between California and Australia. During the 1930s, the United States government made a decision to send colonists to the islands of Baker, Howland, and Jarvis under the American Equatorial Islands Colonization Project, in order to lay claim to the islands. The stated reason for the claim would be to further commercial aviation. Documents presented in this movie suggest that military purposes were contemplated, though they were not to be divulged.

The government recruited the initial 130 colonists among young men at Kamehameha Schools in Hawaii, and also among furloughed Army personnel. The students from Kamehameha school were generally not given very much information about their upcoming assignment. The Coast Guard cutter Itasca delivered the colonists to their islands, and was subsequently used for bringing replacements and supplies.

At the end of the first three-month tour, the furloughed military personnel reported dissatisfaction with the experience, whereas the young men of Native Hawaiian ancestry reportedly enjoyed the experience. Throughout the 1930s, the vast majority of subsequent colonists sent to these islands were Native Hawaiian young men recruited from Kamehameha schools.

Although the colonists initially attempted to grow plants on these islands, they were largely unsuccessful. The most notable achievement of the colonists, besides helping the United States claim these three islands, was to prepare a runway on Howland Island for Amelia Earhart on her planned trip around the world (Amelia Earhart disappeared en route to Howland).

The documentary describes the living conditions of the colonists, including the water scarcity, the abundance of fish and surfing opportunities, the abundant bird life, the isolation of the colonists prior to the installation of radios, and the social and personal interactions of the colonists with each other. Mention is also made of the hardships of the colonists after the attack on Pearl Harbor in December 1941.

The documentary includes interviews with the (now aged) surviving colonists, many contemporary photographs, and occasional descriptions of related political and world events.

The title of the movie is the title of a song written by one of the colonists on Jarvis.

== Outcome of the colonization effort ==
Today, in part because of the efforts of these colonists, these islands are grouped as part of the United States Minor Outlying Islands. They are currently uninhabited and have National Wildlife Refuge designation, meaning they are set aside as protected areas.

== See also ==
- Howland and Baker islands
- Jarvis Island
- Guano Islands Act
