= National Museum of Australia =

Museum in Canberra, Australia

Coordinates: 35.293056°S 149.120833°E

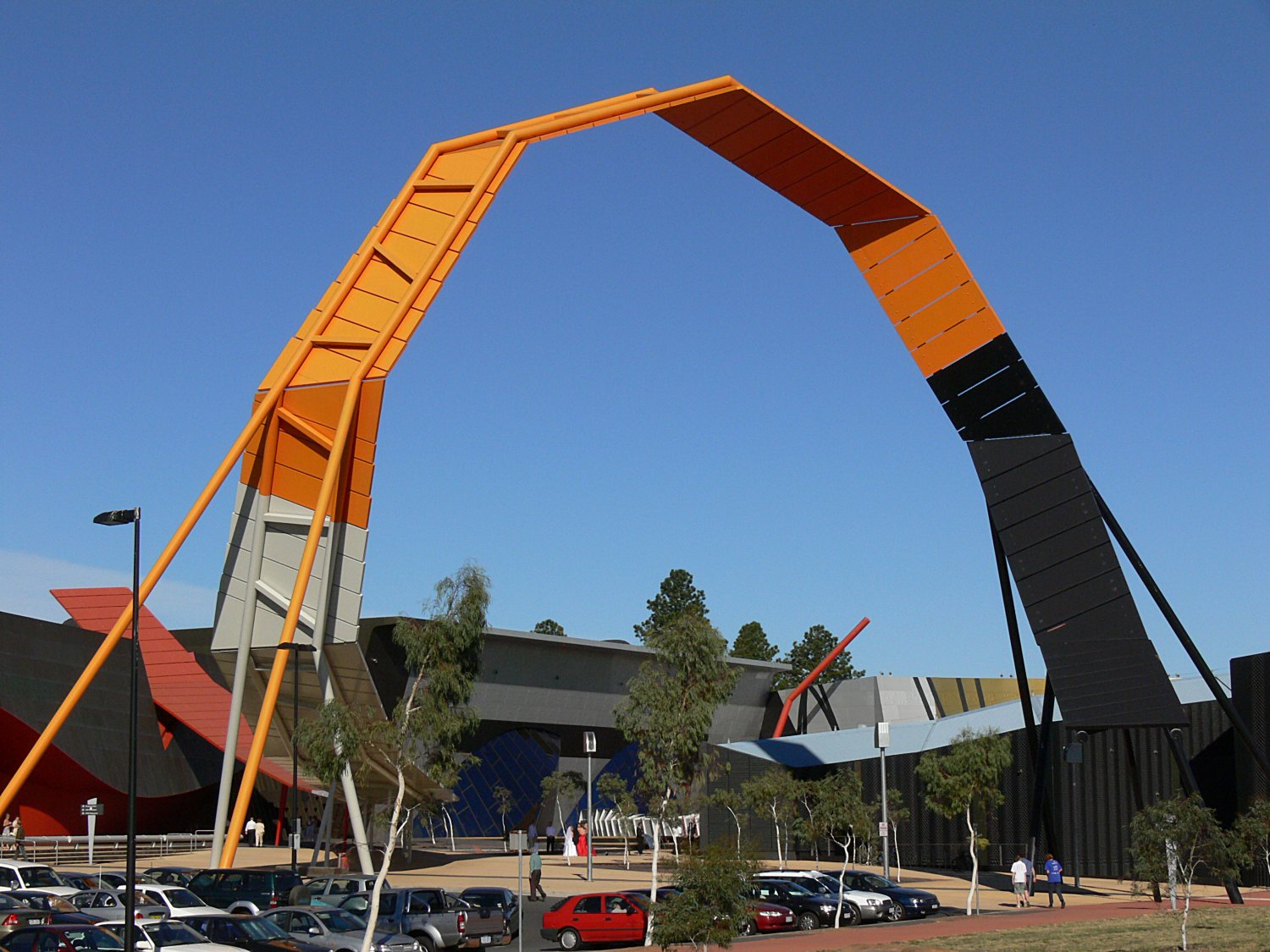
- Established: 1980
- Location: Acton, Canberra, Australian Capital Territory, Australia (Map)
- Director: Katherine McMahon
- Employees: 256
- Website: www.nma.gov.au

The National Museum of Australia (NMA) is a national public museum in Canberra, Capital Territory, Australia. It is operated and funded by the federal government of Australia. It was formally established by the National Museum of Australia Act 1980.

The museum profiles 50,000 years of Indigenous heritage, settlement since 1788, and key events including Federation and the Sydney 2000 Olympics. It holds the world's largest collection of Aboriginal bark paintings and stone tools, the heart of champion racehorse Phar Lap and the Holden prototype No. 1 car. The museum also develops and travels exhibitions on subjects ranging from bushrangers to surf lifesaving. The National Museum of Australia Press publishes a wide range of books, catalogues and journals. The museum's Research Centre takes a cross-disciplinary approach to history, ensuring the museum is a lively forum for ideas and debate about Australia's past, present and future.

The museum's innovative use of new technologies has been central to its growing international reputation in outreach programming, particularly with regional communities. From 2003 to 2008, the museum hosted Talkback Classroom, a student political forum.

The museum did not have a permanent home until 11 March 2001, when a purpose-built museum building was officially opened. It is located on Acton Peninsula in the suburb of Acton, next to the Australian National University. The peninsula on Lake Burley Griffin was previously the home of the Royal Canberra Hospital, which was demolished in tragic circumstances on 13 July 1997.

== Architecture ==
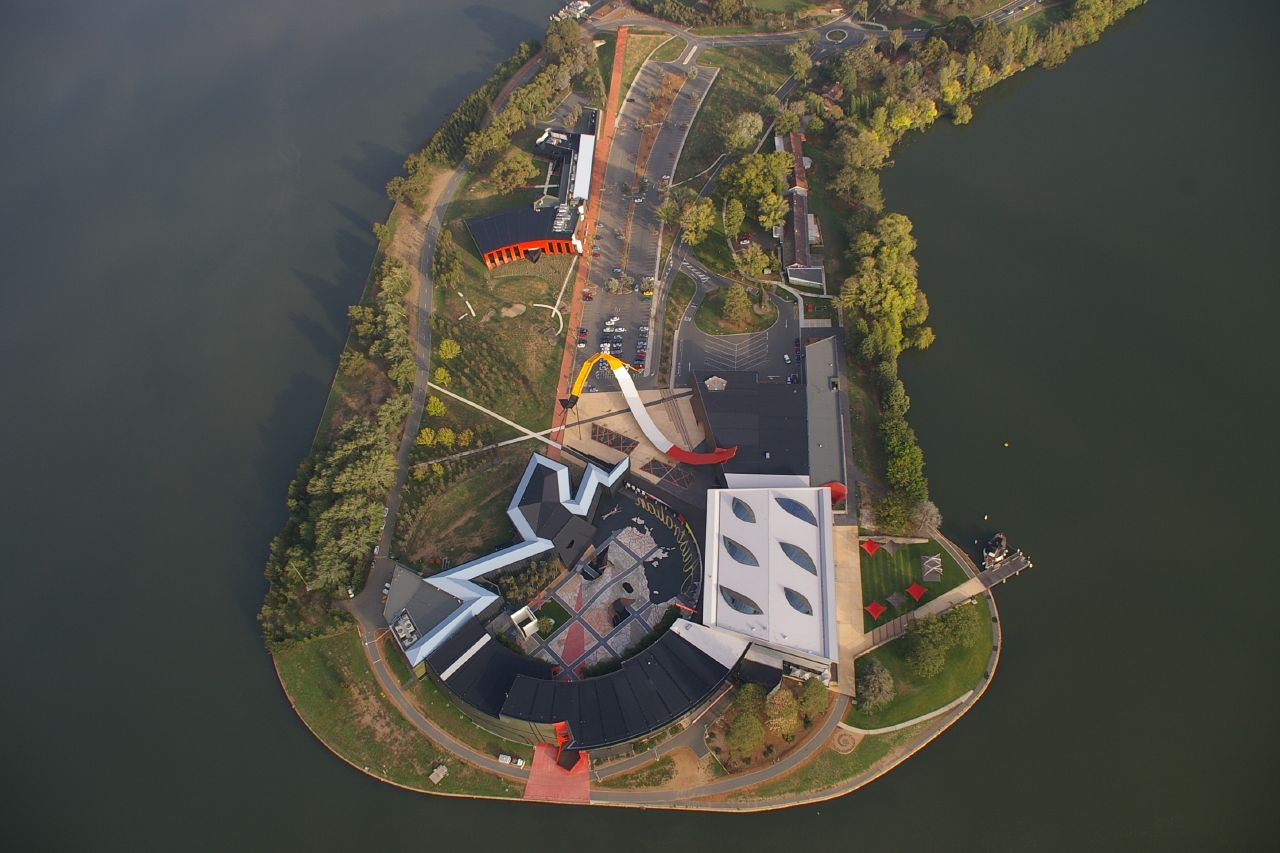
Aerial view of the museum on Acton Peninsula

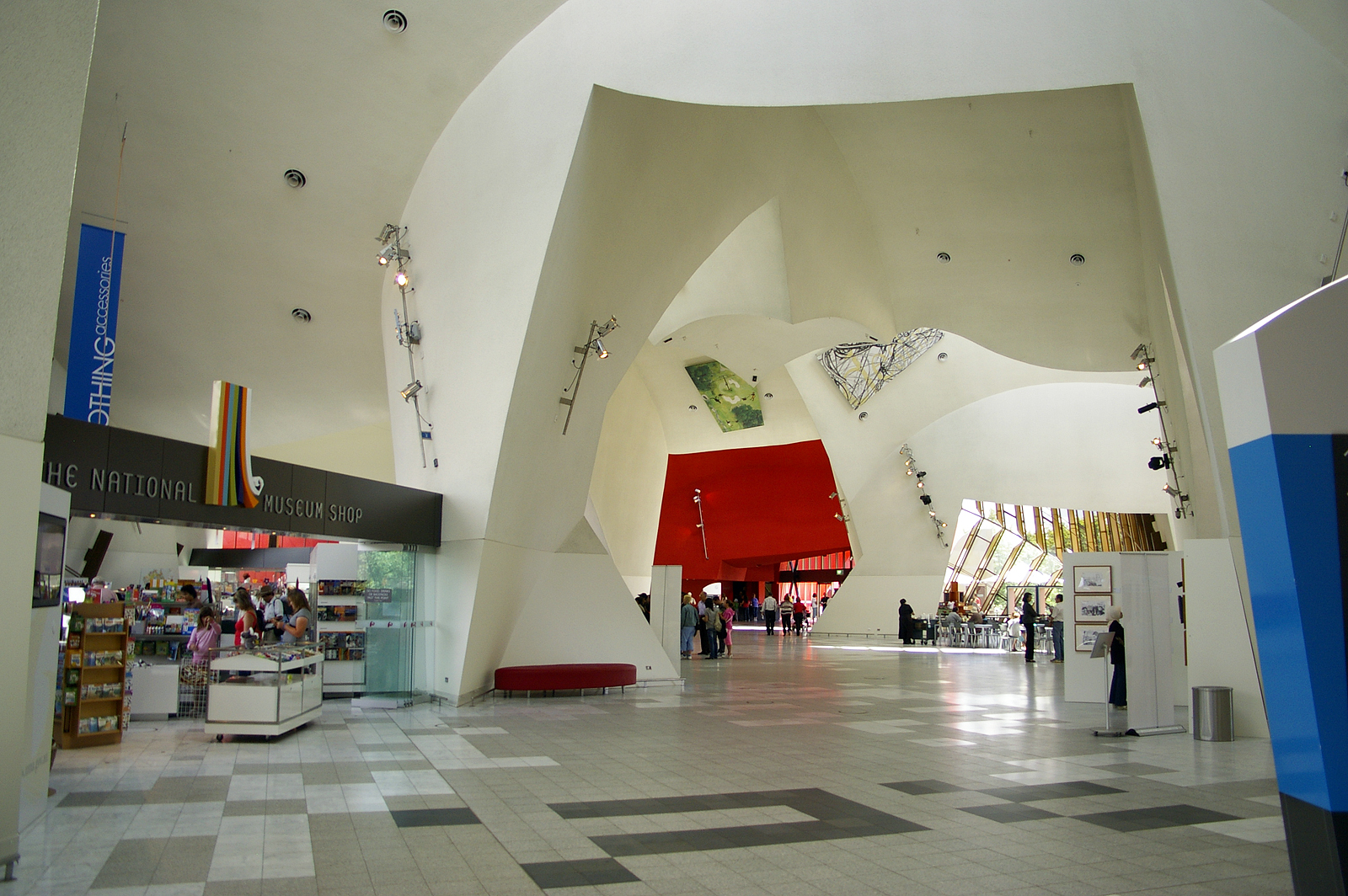
Interior of the National Museum of Australia

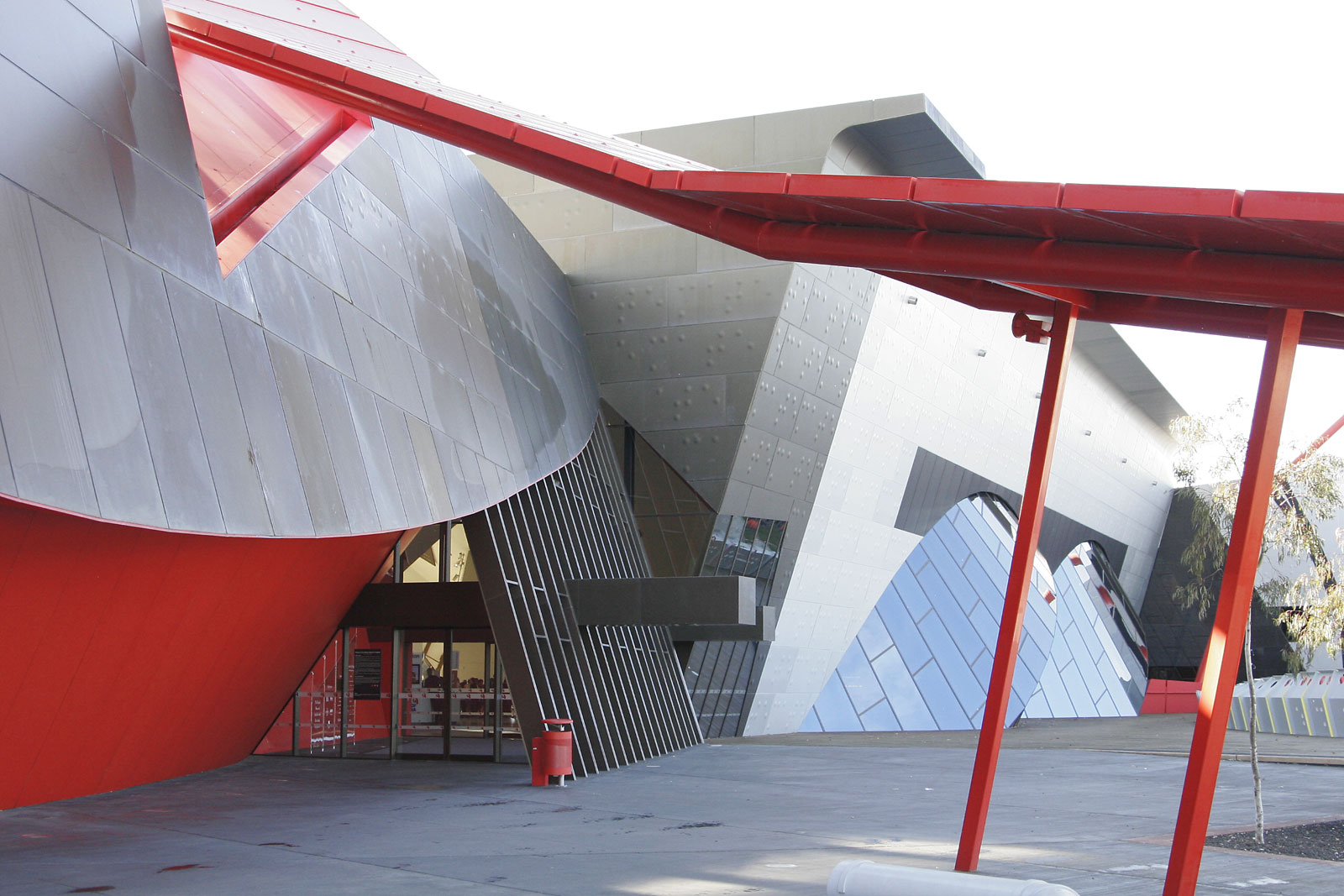
Entrance to National Museum of Australia

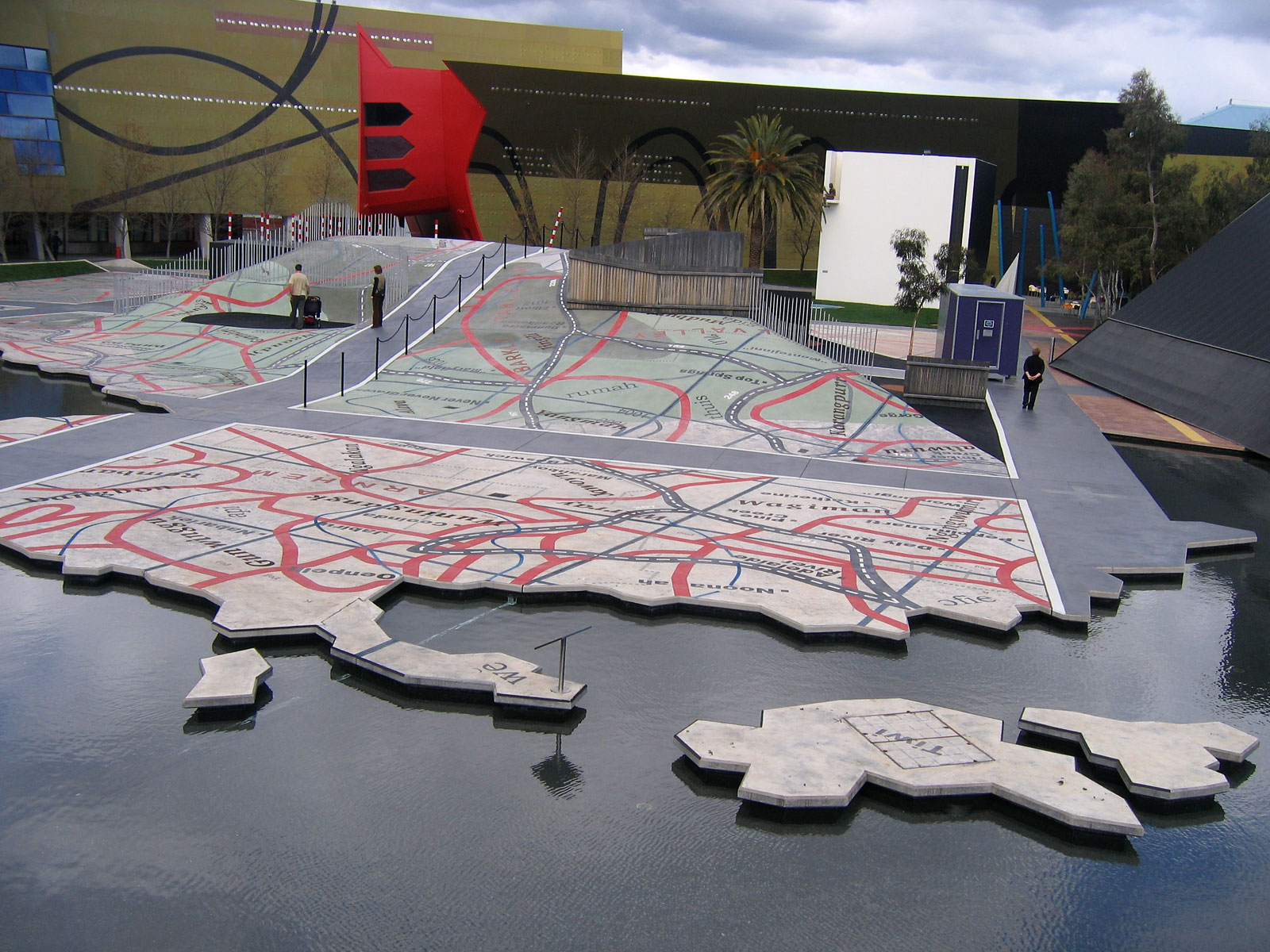
Central "garden" of the National Museum of Australia (Garden of Australian Dreams)

As designed by architect Howard Raggatt (design architect and design director for the project), the museum building is based on a theme of knotted ropes, symbolically bringing together the stories of Australians. The architects stated: "We liked to think that the story of Australia was not one, but many tangled together. Not an authorized version but a puzzling confluence; not merely the resolution of difference but its wholehearted embrace." The building is intended to be the centre of a knot, with trailing ropes or strips extending from the building. The most obvious of these extensions forms a large loop before becoming a walkway which extends past the neighbouring AIATSIS building ending in a large curl, as if a huge ribbon has haphazardly unrolled itself along the ground. Known as the "Uluru Axis" because it aligns with the central Australian natural landmark, the ribbon symbolically integrates the site with the Canberra city plan by Walter Burley Griffin and the spiritual heart of indigenous Australia.

The shape of the main entrance hall continues this theme: it is as though the otherwise rectangular building has been built encasing a complex knot which does not quite fit inside the building, and then the knot taken away. The entirely non-symmetrical complex is designed to not look like a museum, with startling colours and angles, unusual spaces and unpredictable projections and textures.

Though hard to precisely categorise, the building can be seen as an example of Charles Jencks' "new paradigm". Some characteristics of Deconstructivism can also be identified.

The organising concept of the scheme using the idea of a "tangled vision" incorporates a variety of references including:

- Bea Maddock's Philosophy Tape
- Jackson Pollock's Blue Poles
- Boolean string, a knot, and Ariadne's thread
- The Aboriginal Dreamtime story of the Rainbow Serpent making the land.

The building's architecture is thus intended to imply that the story of Australia is not one story, but many stories tangled together. The building also refers to or quotes other buildings:

- A Burley-Griffin designed cloister at Newman College, Melbourne
- The Sydney Opera House – both the parts designed by Jørn Utzon, and sections designed by the other architects
- The shell curves of Félix Candela
- The Hall is evocative of Eero Saarinen's terminal at the John F. Kennedy Airport in New York
- The arc is like a piece of work by Richard Serra
- The Garden of Australian Dreams is intended to evoke a range of different cartographies
- The walls use selected fragments of the word 'Eternity' – evoking the story of Arthur Stace who for thirty years chalked this single word on the pavements of Sydney
- The most controversial quotation is a reference to the Daniel Libeskind's Jewish Museum Berlin, Germany, which opened in 1999

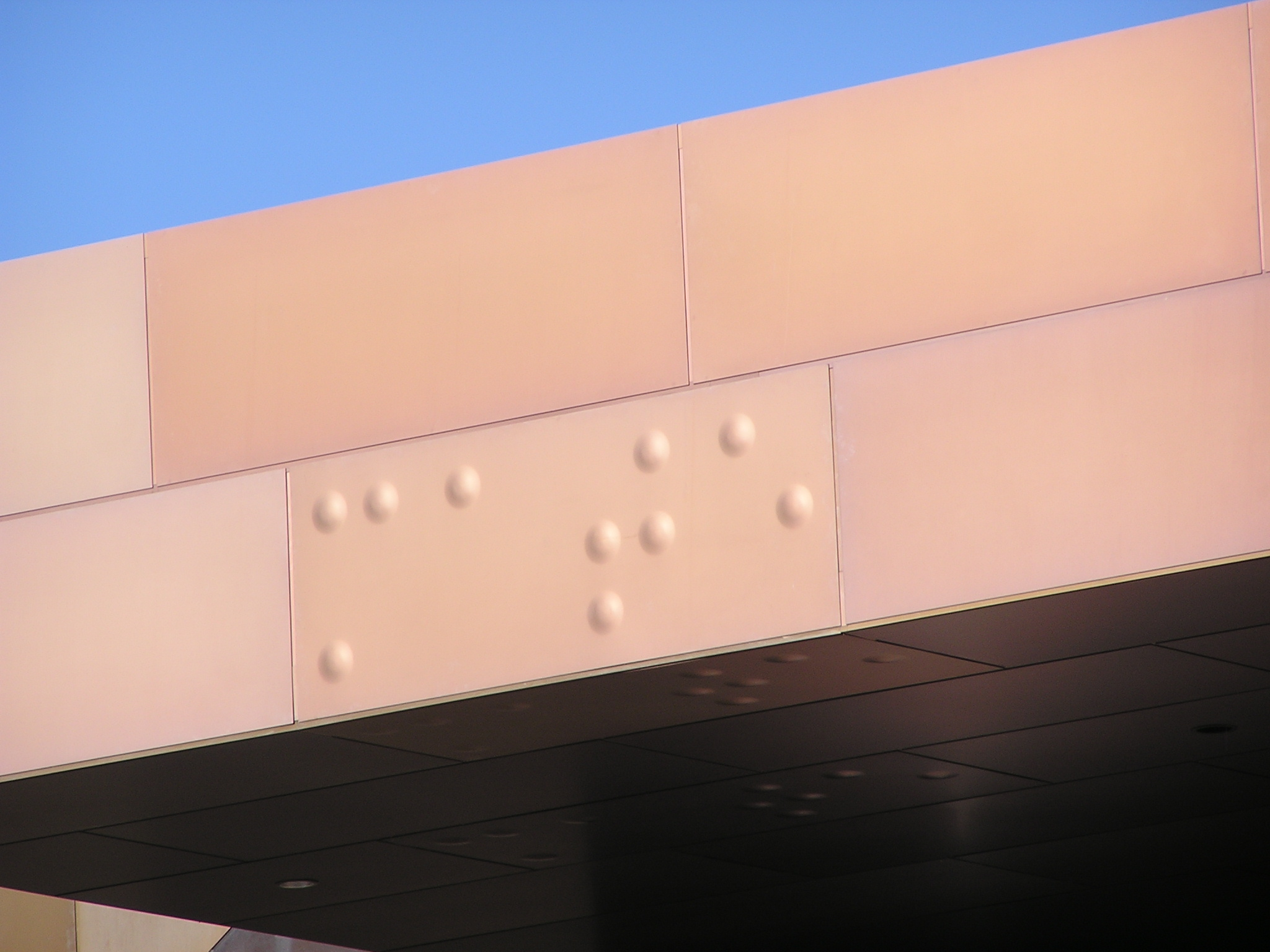
"mate" in braille

The plan of the National Museum of Australia incorporates an exact copy of the lightning-flash zigzag that Libeskind created for the Berlin Museum by breaking a star of David. The Bulletin magazine first publicly raised allegations of plagiarism in June 2000. Libeskind was reported to be angry with the copying. Raggatt's defence against plagiarism was that the design was a quotation rather than a copy. The director of the museum, Dawn Casey, stated that she and her council were not aware of this

symbolism when they approved the plan.

The exterior of the building is covered in anodised aluminium panels. Many of the panels include words written in braille and other decorative devices. Among the messages are "mate" and "she'll be right". Also included were such controversial words and phrases as "sorry" and "forgive us our genocide". These more controversial messages have been obscured with silver discs being attached to the surface making the braille illegible.

Among the phrases in braille are the words "Resurrection city". The phrase may refer to the clearing of the former Canberra Hospital to make way for the museum or it could be a reference to reconciliation between Indigenous Australians and European settlers. The phrase is used as a label in tiles on another of Raggett's buildings, the Storey Hall in Melbourne. Raggett says of that message: "I guess that tries to be some big sort of theme for this building as well and its sort of set of memories."

It was built by Bovis Lend Lease and completed in 2001.

Art critic Christopher Allen described it as "undoubtedly the ugliest example of official architecture in Australia... a painful example of inept, clumsy and gratuitous form justified by kitsch symbolism".

=== Hail storm damage ===
A severe thunderstorm hit Canberra on the afternoon of 29 December 2006 and caused roof damage to the administration section of the museum. The ceiling collapsed under the weight of hail. The damage exposed power cables and left two centimetres of water on the floor. The water also damaged several paintings by a Sydney artist which were associated with an exhibition about Australian lifesavers. However, the main part of the building was unaffected and nothing from the museum's collection was damaged. The building was re-opened to the public a day later. The damage was expected to cost at least A$500,001 to repair.

=== Building works 2012/13 ===
In 2012, building works commenced on a new cafe and administration wing.

The new cafe opened in late 2012. It overlooks Lake Burley Griffin and offers both indoor and outdoor dining. The relocation of the museum's cafe freed up the vast entry Hall for the display of large objects from the museum's collection, including vehicles.

The new administration wing, which links the main building with the existing administration building, was completed in mid-2013. The new building is clad in brightly coloured tiles arranged in a QR code pattern.

== Collection ==
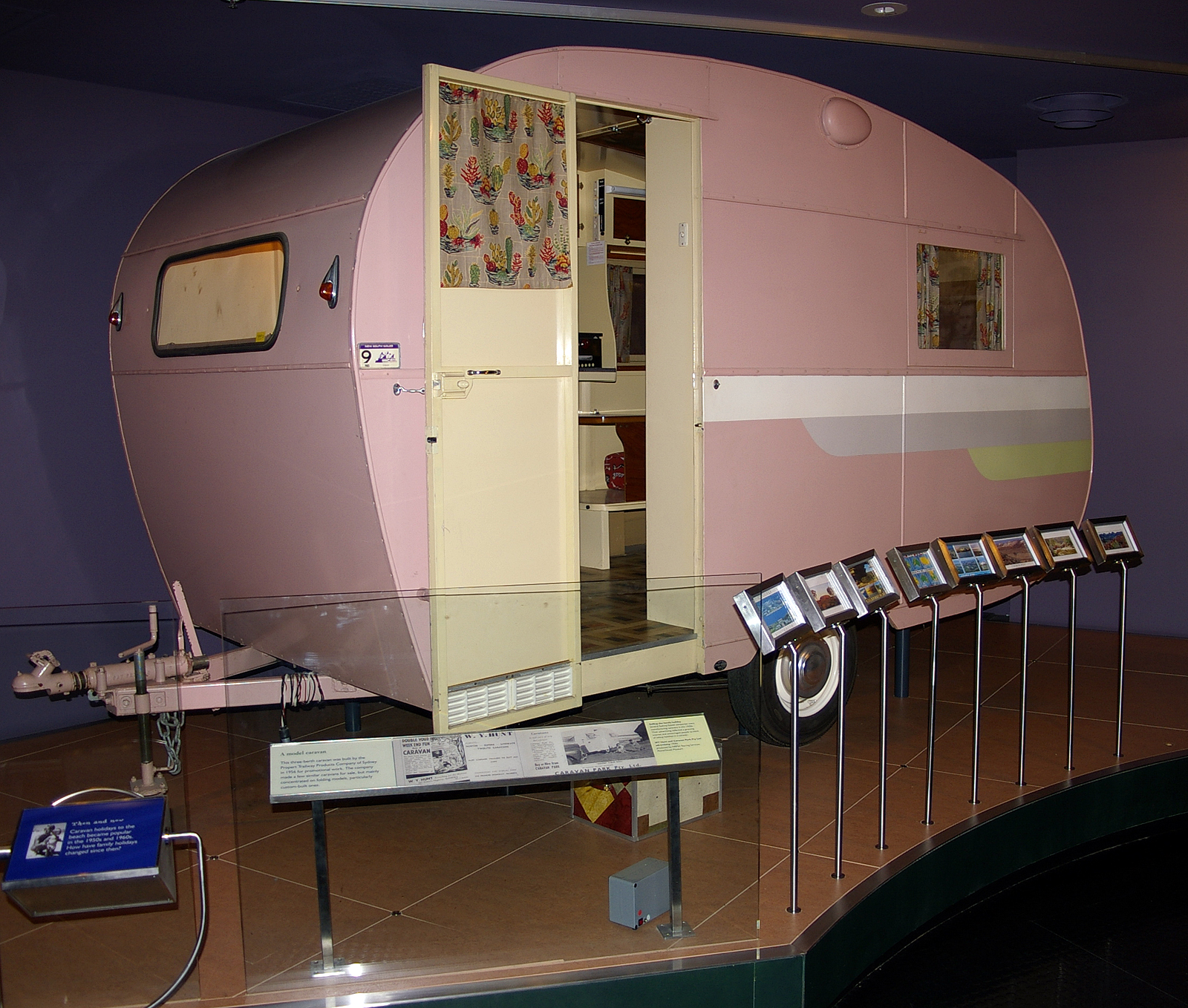
1956 Propert Trailaway touring caravan at the National Museum of Australia

The museum's collection, known as the National Historical Collection, includes over 210,000 objects. The collection focuses on three themes: the culture and history of Aboriginal and Torres Strait Islander peoples, Australian history and culture since European settlement in 1788, and interactions between people and the Australian environment. Notable objects (as identified by the museum on their website) include:

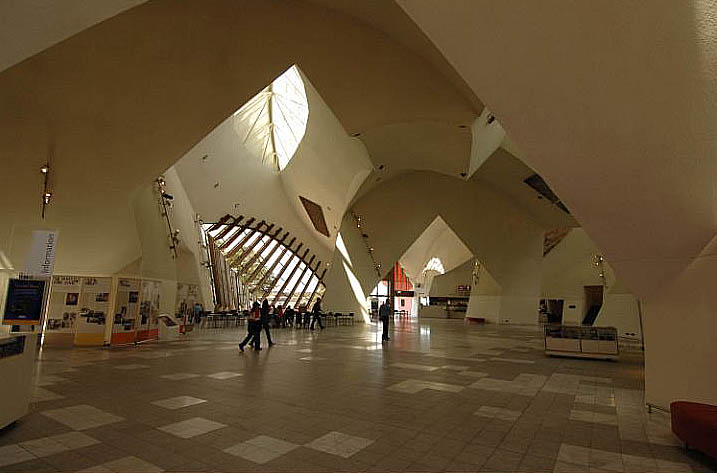
- Central hall
  Various items relating to the death of Azaria Chamberlain, including a yellow Holden Torana (later sold to the museum by Michael Chamberlain)
- Bicycles owned by Australian cyclist and winner of the 2011 Tour de France, Cadel Evans
- Navigational instruments used by Captain James Cook
- The Sir Douglas Mawson collection, including four items relating to the British Australian and New Zealand Antarctic Research Expedition (aka BANZARE) in 1931, including three proclamations relating to claiming land in Antarctica, and a food canister.
- Medical equipment used by ophthalmologist Fred Hollows
- A holey dollar, the first currency minted in Australia
- Netball memorabilia of Liz Ellis, who played in the Australia national netball team
- Olympic medals won by John Konrads at the 1960 Rome Olympics
- Props from children's television show Play School
- An Australian flag found in the ruins of World Trade Center after the September 11 attacks
- The fleece of Chris the sheep, a merino ram that became internationally famous in 2015 after being found wandering, and later shorn of a record amount of wool fleece

The museum also functions as a temporary repository for the repatriation of ancestral remains. It is involved in projects to return the remains of indigenous Australians, held in the collections of museums across the world, to their communities of origin. These projects have seen the return of over 1,400 remains as of March 2019.

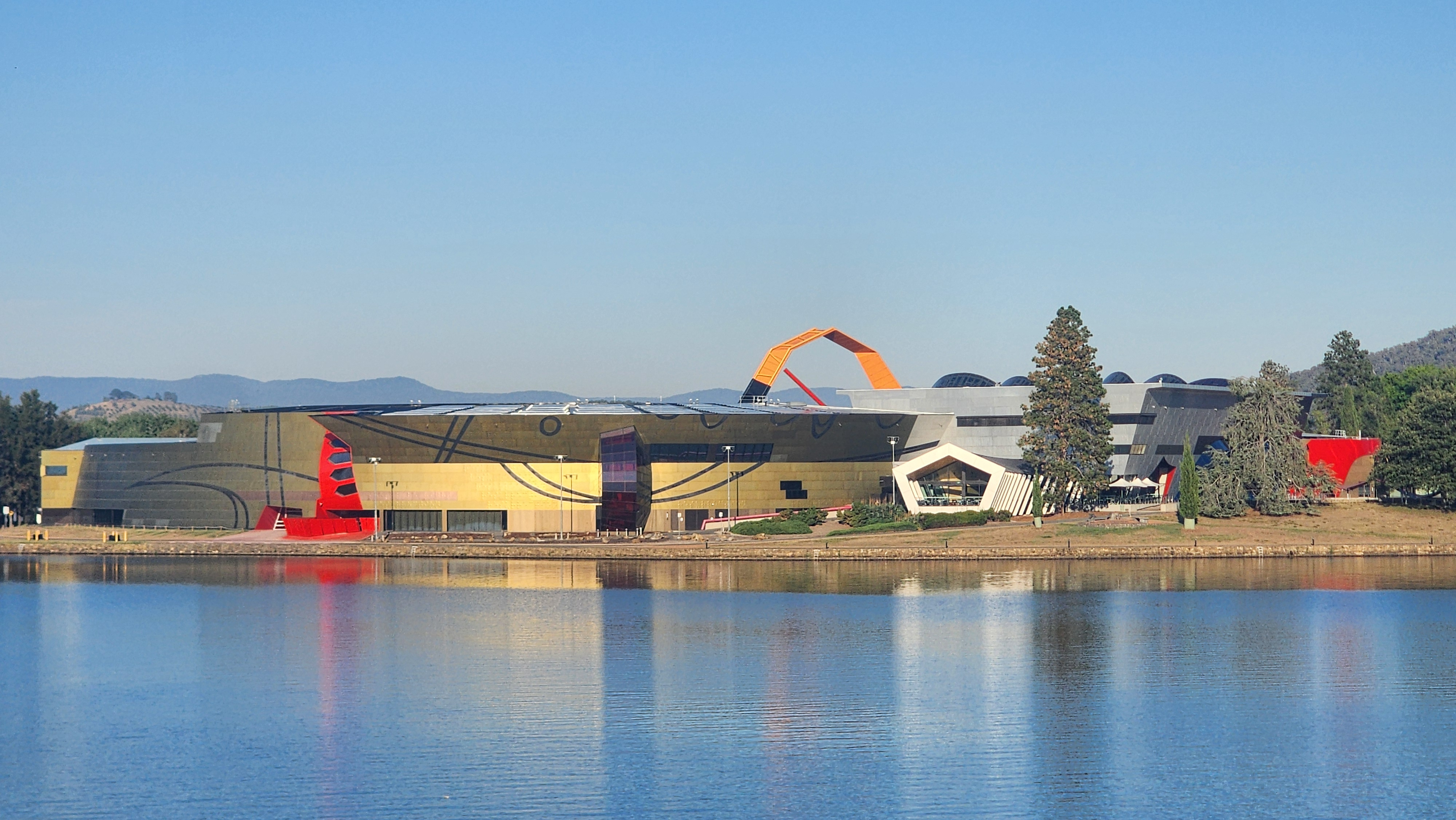
View from Commonwealth Avenue Bridge

== Past exhibitions ==
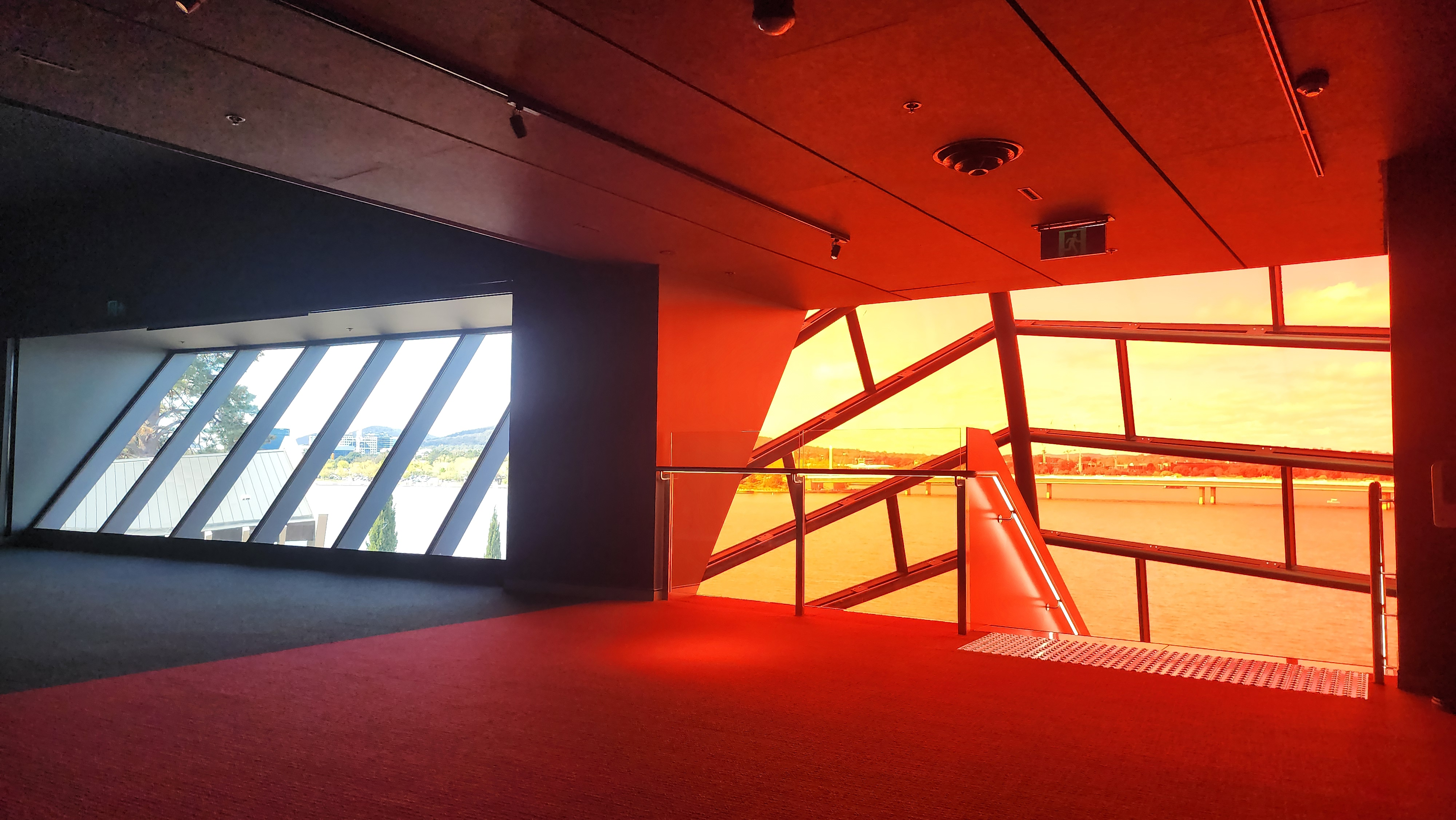
Paradox of white and red rays in the National Museum of Australia

=== Songlines: Tracking the Seven Sisters ===
On 15 September 2017, the exhibition Songlines: Tracking the Seven Sisters, referencing the creation myth of the Seven Sisters that is common to many groups in the Western and Central Deserts, was launched at the NMA. It was instigated by aṉangu people, and was a collaboration with Aboriginal elders who are custodians of the Dreamtime story. The exhibition included a huge painting called Yarrkalpa — Hunting Ground, which symbolically depicts the area around Parnngurr in Western Australia, showing the seasons, cultural burning practices and Indigenous management of the land and natural resources. In June 2022, the work was projected onto the Sydney Opera House as part of the Vivid Sydney festival.

The exhibition ran until February 2018, and travelled to Berlin, Germany, in 2022 and is due to be shown in Paris, France, in 2023.

=== Other past exhibitions ===
Other past exhibitions include:

- Nation: Symbols of Australia: from the Hills Hoist clothes line to the legend of ANZAC, this exhibition approached Australian history through Australian symbols (March 2001 – January 2010)
- Horizons: The Peopling of Australia since 1788: traced stories of human relocation and looked at how immigration to Australia has shaped Australia (March 2001 – October 2007)
- Paipa: explored Torres Strait Islander migration and the continuing strong cultural connections between mainland communities and the Torres Strait (July 2002 – July 2006)
- Outlawed! The World's Rebels, Revolutionaries and Bushrangers: examined outlaw legends from nine countries and featured two bronze replicas of Joe Byrne’s Kelly Gang armour produced by Cameron McFarlane (Carus Imago) in collaboration with Sydney sculptor Jody Pawley (28 November 2003 – 26 April 2004).
- Royal Romance: examined Australia's passionate response to Queen Elizabeth II's first visit to Australia in 1954, and whether the nation has fallen out of love since (February–October 2004)
- Behind the Lines: The Year's Best Cartoons 2003: brought together a selection of the best works entered in the National Museum of Australia's 2003 Political Cartooning Competition (May–June 2004)
- Extremes: Survival in the Great Deserts of the Southern Hemisphere: explored some of the world's great southern deserts, tracing the history, culture and commonalities of Southern Africa's Namib and Kalahari deserts, South America's Atacama, and Australia's Red Centre (December 2004 – August 2005)
- In Search of the Birdsville Track: An Artist in the Outback: featured sketches and writings donated to the museum's collection by Noelle Sandwith that capture the unique environment, characters and lifestyles of the Birdsville Track (June–October 2005)
- Behind the Lines: The Year's Best Cartoons 2004: a selection of the best works entered in the 2004 political cartooning competition (March–June 2005)
- Captivating and Curious: displayed the National Museum's varied collection, with new acquisitions and old favourites from the National Historical Collection (December 2005 – March 2006)
- Between the Flags: 100 Years of Surf Lifesaving: developed in conjunction with Surf Life Saving Australia, this exhibition celebrated the centenary of surf lifesaving in Australia (December 2006 – March 2007)
- Behind the Lines: The Year's Best Cartoons 2006: featured the best of the museum's 2006 acquisitions of cartoons from cartoonists around Australia (December 2006 – March 2007)
- Dhari a Krar: Headdresses and Masks from the Torres Strait: developed in collaboration with the Cairns Regional Art Gallery, this exhibition brought together a diverse collection of masks, headdresses and dance objects from the Torres Strait (July 2006 – July 2011)
- Collector Cam King: displayed a selection of Brian and Barbara Lynch's old grocery wares and toys following their win in the Collector Cam competition run by ABC Television's Collectors program (January–February 2007)
- Great Railway Journeys of Australia: explored the development of Australia's rail network and featured some of the most famous railway journeys in the country such as the old and new Ghan, the Queenslander and the Indian Pacific (April–August 2007)
- Migration Memories: explored the migration stories of people from diverse backgrounds who now call the distinctively different regional centres of Lightning Ridge (an opal mining town in central north NSW) and Robinvale (a horticultural town on the Murray River in north western Victoria) home (September–November 2007)
- Australia at Expo 67 Montreal: forty years after Canada's Montreal welcomed more than 50 million visitors to Expo 67 over a period of six months, this exhibition explored the world of Australia at Expo 67 (September–October 2007)
- Papunya Painting: Out of the Desert: highlighted the museum's collection of Indigenous Western Desert art – works that have rarely been seen in Australia (November 2007 – February 2008)
- Miss Australia: A Nation's Quest: traced the history of the Miss Australia quest from 1907 through to its final year in 2000 (March–June 2007)
- 70% Urban: drew on the museum's collection to explore Indigenous culture in the city (March 2007 – March 2008)
- Behind the Lines: The Year's Best Cartoons 2007: exhibited the best of the museum's latest set of cartoon acquisitions from artists around Australia including Alan Moir, Bill Leak, Cathy Wilcox, Geoff Pryor, John Spooner and Mark Knight (December 2007 – February 2008)
- Utopia: The Genius of Emily Kame Kngwarreye: told the story of Emily Kame Kngwarreye, one of Australia's greatest contemporary artists (August–October 2008)
- Behind the Lines: The Year's Best Cartoons 2008: featured a selection of the best Australian political cartoons published in 2008 (December 2008 – February 2009)
- A Fine Yarn: Innovations in Australia's Wool Industry: examined the fine wool industry in Australia today, while recognising the importance of wool in Australia's social and economic history (July–November 2009)
- Behind the Lines: The Year's Best Cartoons 2009: featured a selection of some of the best Australian political cartoons published in 2009 (December 2009 – January 2010)
- Papunya Painting: Out of the Australian Desert: highlighted the museum's collection of Indigenous Western Desert art (June–August 2010)
- Exploration and Endeavour: The Royal Society of London and the South Seas: celebrated the 350th anniversary of the Royal Society of London and brought together unique treasures associated with voyages of scientific discovery to the South Seas (September 2010 – February 2011)
- Behind the Lines: The Year's Best Cartoons 2010: celebrated the wit and artistry of Australia's established political cartoonists as well as recognising the talents of a new generation of cartoonists (December 2010 – October 2011)
- Not Just Ned: A true history of the Irish in Australia: an exhibition about the history and extraordinary influence of the Irish in Australia, from the arrival of the First Fleet in 1788 to the present (March–July 2011)
- Off the Walls: Art from Aboriginal and Torres Strait Islander Affairs Agencies 1967–2005: traced the history of artworks given to or acquired by federal Indigenous agencies; it included a collection of some 2000 works in the NMA's National Historical Collection (October 2011 – June 2012)
- Inside: Life in Children's Homes and Institutions: featured the words, voices and objects of the forgotten Australians, former child migrants and those who experienced institutional care as children (November 2011 – February 2012)
- Museum Workshop: examined the behind-the-scenes world of the conservators responsible for the physical care of objects in the museum's collection (October 2012 – January 2013).

== Tourism awards ==
In the annual Australian Tourism Awards, the National Museum was named Australia's Major Tourist Attraction in both 2005 and 2006. The museum was named winner of the Canberra and Capital Region's Tourism Award for Major Tourist Attraction five years running from 2003 to 2007.

== See also ==
- HMS Investigator Anchors, its stream anchor is at the NMA
- PS Enterprise, an 1878 paddle steamer owned and operated by the Museum
