= Heather Giugni =

American politician

Member of the Hawaii House of Representatives from the 33rd district
- In office February 21, 2012 – January 2013
- Preceded by: Tom Okamura
- Succeeded by: Mark Takai

Personal details
- Party: Democratic
- Profession: Filmmaker

Heather Haunani Giugni is an American filmmaker, politician, and a former representative in the Hawaii House of Representatives. She represented District 33, comprising the Honolulu neighborhoods of Aiea and Halawa. She was appointed to the legislature in February 2012, and left office in January 2013.

== Early life and career ==
One of four sisters, Giugni comes from a family of Hawaii public servants. Her great-grandfather was appointed in 1897 to a judgeship in the Ewa District. Her father, Henry Giugni, was a longtime confidant to U.S. Senator Daniel K. Inouye, eventually becoming sergeant-at-arms of the United States Senate. His work with Inouye led to the family moving to Washington.

Heather Giugni attended Kamehameha Schools before attending the University of Maryland, where she graduated with a bachelor's degree in journalism. She worked for KGMB news from 1982 to 1986, when she founded Juniroa Productions, her own film-making company. She has produced and directed documentaries, including Under a Jarvis Moon (2010) alongside Noelle Kahanu. She has also created public service announcements, training videos, oral histories, Internet and interactive content.

== Political career ==
In 1972, Giugni served as a delegate to the Democratic National Convention in Miami, where she was the youngest delegate.

In November 2011, the majority leader of the Hawaii House of Representatives, Blake Oshiro, announced that he would resign from the legislature to become Governor Neil Abercrombie's deputy chief of staff. Per Hawaii law, Governor Abercrombie had to select Oshiro's successor as state representative from the 33rd district. His replacement, former state representative and majority leader Tom Okamura, had to resign just weeks later for health reasons. Abercrombie appointed Giugni to the seat in February 2012. She took office on February 21, 2012.

She ran for the seat in 2012, where she faced a Democratic primary challenge from state representative Mark Takai, whose district got combined with Giugni's as a result of redistricting. In the Democratic primary election held on August 11, 2012, Takai defeated Giugni.
