= Noelle Kahanu =

American researcher and author

Noelle M.K.Y. Kahanu is a Native Hawaiian academic, curator, writer, and lawyer. A former director of community affairs at the Bishop Museum, she directed the 2010 documentary film Under a Jarvis Moon, about the young Hawaiian men sent to work on Howland, Jarvis, and Baker Islands.

== Biography ==
Noelle Kahanu was born in Honolulu. She is of Hawaiian, Japanese, Chinese, and Scottish background.

In 1988, she graduated with a bachelor's in political science from the University of Hawaiʻi at Mānoa. She then pursued a Juris Doctor degree from the William S. Richardson School of Law at the University of Hawaiʻi at Mānoa, graduating in 1992. She subsequently served as counsel to the United States Senate Committee on Indian Affairs from 1992 to 1997. Returning to Hawaii from Washington, Kahanu then worked for the Office of Hawaiian Affairs and the Native Hawaiian Education Council.

From 1998 to 2014, she worked for the Bishop Museum, a history and science museum in Honolulu, eventually becoming its director of community affairs. While at the museum, she produced 25 exhibitions on Native Hawaiian art, history, and culture, and helped shape the museum's extensive renovations. She has also worked on efforts to repatriate artifacts taken from Indigenous groups, alongside her partner, Eddie Ayau.

With Heather Giugni, Kahanu co-directed and co-produced the 2010 documentary film Under a Jarvis Moon, which told the stories of the young Hawaiian men sent by the U.S. government to secretly colonize Howland, Jarvis, and Baker Islands in the Pacific before World War II. The film had its origins in a 2002 exhibition at the Bishop Museum, "Hui Panalāʻau: Hawaiian Colonists, American Citizens." Kahanu's own grandfather, George Kahanu Sr., had been one of the men sent to Jarvis Island.

Since 2014, Kahanu has worked as a specialist at the University of Hawaiʻi at Mānoa's American Studies department. In 2023, she was selected as one of three curators of the 2025 Hawaiʻi Triennial.

In 2020, she was a co-author of the book Refocusing Ethnographic Museums Through Oceanic Lenses. She has also published works of poetry, including pieces written in Hawaiian Pidgin, as well as the children's book Raven and the Sun: Echoing Our Ancestors. She has produced works of traditional art using modern materials, and in 2008, Senator Daniel Inouye, with whom Kahanu worked on the Committee on Indian Affairs, selected her to decorate Hawaii's ornament on the White House Christmas tree.
