= Noal (name) =

Noal is a given name and surname. Notable people with the name include:

- Noal Akins (1938–2022), American politician
- Noal Zaher (born 1980), Afghan designer
- Giuseppe Noal (born 1950), Italian rower
- Yago Noal (born 2007), Brazilian footballer

== Fictional characters ==
- Noal Charin, member of the Band of the Red Hand in The Wheel of Time

== See also ==
- Noel (disambiguation)
