= Nowell (given name) =

Nowell is a masculine English given name derived from Noël, meaning Christmas in French. Notable people with the name include:

- Nowell Myres (1902–1989), British archaeologist
- Nowell Parr (1864–1933), British architect
- Nowell Salmon (1835–1912), Royal Navy officer
- Nowell Sotherton (died c. 1610), English politician
- Nowell Twopeny (1819–1869), English priest

== See also ==
- Noel (given name)
- Nowell (surname)
