= Noel =

Noel or Noël may refer to:

== Christmas ==
- Noël, French for Christmas
- Noel is another name for a Christmas carol

== Places ==
- Noel, Missouri, United States, a city
- Noel, Nova Scotia, Canada, a community
- Noel Park, a suburb in Greater London, England
- 1563 Noël, an asteroid
- Mount Noel, British Columbia, Canada

== People ==
- Noel (given name)
- Noel (surname)

== Arts, entertainment, and media ==
=== Music ===
- Noel, another term for a pastorale of a Christmas nature
- Noël (Joan Baez album), 1966
- Noël (Josh Groban album), 2007
- Noel (Noel Pagan album), 1988
- Noël (The Priests album), 2010
- Noel (Phil Vassar album), 2011
- Noel (Josh Wilson album), 2012
- Noel, 2015 Christmas album by Detail
- "The First Noel", a traditional English Christmas carol
- "Noel", a 2007 song by All Time Low from The Party Scene
- Noël (singer) (active late 1970s), American disco singer
- Noel (band), a South Korean group
- Noel Pagan, American freestyle singer who recorded under the name Noel

=== Television ===
- Noel (TV series), a Philippine drama
- "Noël" (The West Wing), a 2000 television episode

=== Other uses in arts, entertainment, and media ===
- Noël: A Christmas Story, a 1910 book by Christian Reid
- Noël, a 1992 animated television special written by Romeo Muller and directed by Masaki Îzuka
- Noel (film), 2004
- Batman: Noël, a 2011 comic by Lee Bermejo
- Le Petit Noël or Noël, a Belgian comics series or its eponymous character

== Other uses ==
- Noel (company), a Colombian cookie manufacturer
- NOEL or NOAEL, in toxicology, an acronym for no-observed-adverse-effect level
- Hurricane Noel, in the 2007 Atlantic season
- Noel baronets, three titles, one extant

== See also ==
- Noël Noël, a 2003 Canadian animated short film
- Noël-Noël (1897–1989), French actor and screenwriter
- Noel! Noel!! Noel!!!, a 2011 holiday album by Michel Legrand
- Noell (disambiguation)
- Nowell (disambiguation)
- Media related to Noel (given name) at Wikimedia Commons
