= Noell =

Noell may refer to:

== Surname ==
- Charles Noell (born c. 1953), American businessman and racehorse owner
- Charles P. Noell (1812–1887), American politician
- John William Noell (1816–1863), American politician
- Martin Noell, English merchant
- Robert Noell, Chief Justice of Jamaica in 1688
- Thomas Noell (died 1702), 26th Mayor of New York City
- Thomas E. Noell (1839–1867), American politician

== Given name ==
- Noell Coet (born 1994), American actress

== Places ==
- Noell Junction, an unincorporated community in Dallas County, Texas; changed its name to Addison in 1904

== See also ==
- Noel (disambiguation)
- Noelle
