= Jarvis Island =

Coral island in the South Pacific Ocean

Nickname: Bunker Island
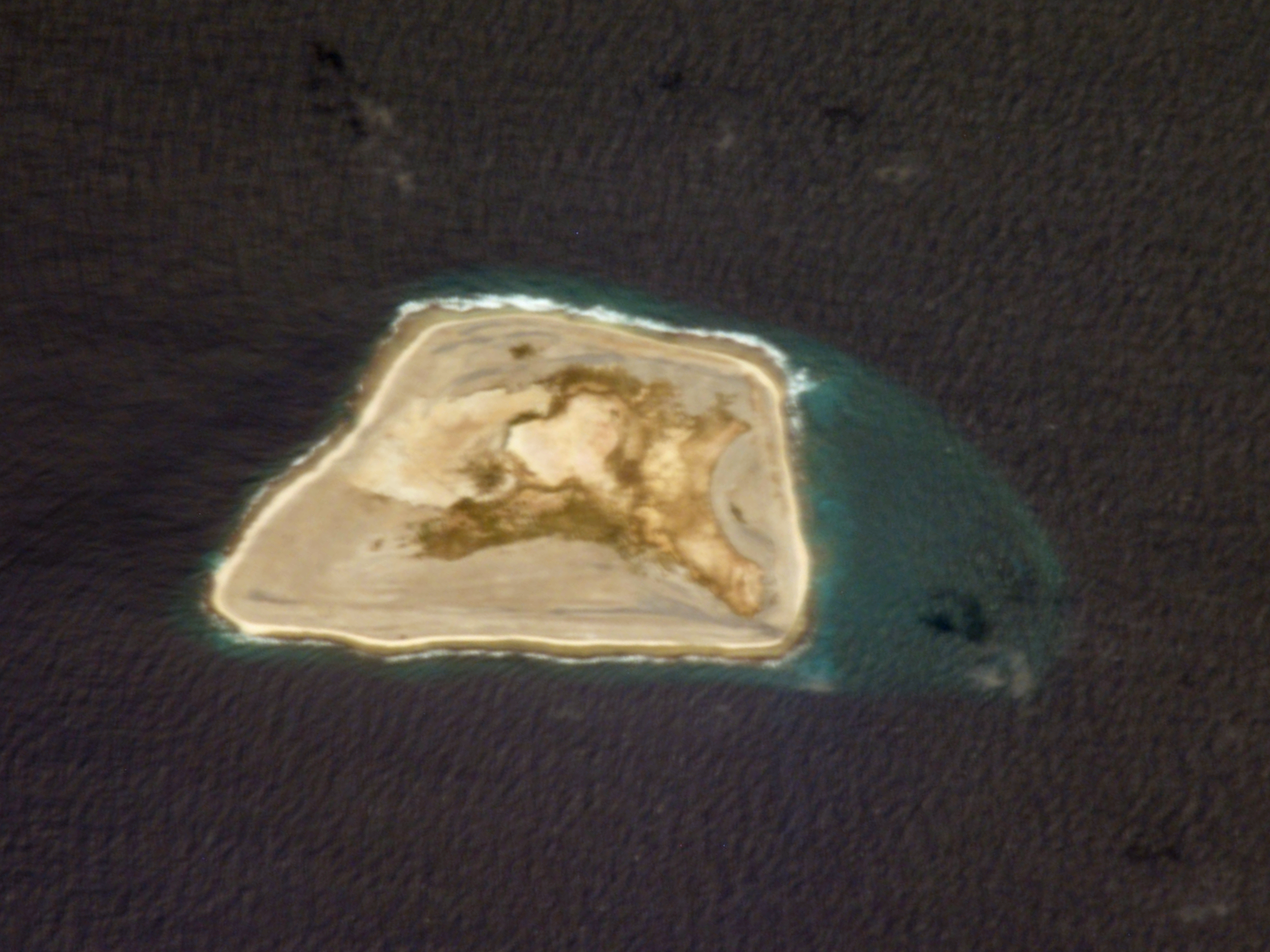
- NASA satellite photo of Jarvis Island showing the submerged reef beyond the eastern end

- Location within Oceania
- Etymology: Edward, Thomas and William Jarvis

Geography
- Location: South Pacific Ocean
- Coordinates: 0.372°S 159.996°W
- Archipelago: Line Islands
- Area: 4.5 km^{2} (1.7 sq mi)
- Length: 3.2 km (1.99 mi)
- Width: 2.2 km (1.37 mi)
- Coastline: 8 km (5 mi)
- Highest elevation: 7 m (23 ft)

Administration
- United States
- Status: unincorporated

Demographics
- Population: 0

Additional information
- Time zone: Samoa Time Zone (UTC-11:00)
- Jarvis Island National Wildlife Refuge
- IUCN category Ia (strict nature reserve)
- Designated: 1974
- Website: www.fws.gov/refuge/jarvis-island

Jarvis Island (/ˈdʒɑːrvɪs/; formerly known as Bunker Island or Bunker's Shoal) is an uninhabited 4.5 km^{2} (1.7 sq mi) coral island located in the South Pacific Ocean, about halfway between Hawaii and the Cook Islands. It is an unincorporated, unorganized territory of the United States, administered by the United States Fish and Wildlife Service of the United States Department of the Interior as part of the National Wildlife Refuge system. Unlike most coral atolls, the lagoon on Jarvis is wholly dry.

Jarvis is one of the Line Islands and, for statistical purposes, is also grouped as one of the United States Minor Outlying Islands. Jarvis Island is the largest of three U.S. equatorial possessions, which include Baker Island and Howland Island.

The United States claimed it in the 19th century and mined it for guano. In the 20th century, it was the subject of a small settlement. It was attacked during World War II and evacuated, leaving some buildings and a day beacon. In modern times, it is managed as a nature reserve.

== Geography and ecology ==
Orthographic projection over Jarvis Island

While a few offshore anchorage spots are marked on maps, Jarvis Island has no ports or harbors, and swift currents are a hazard. There is a boat landing area in the middle of the western shoreline near a crumbling day beacon and another near the island's southwest corner. The center of Jarvis island is a dried lagoon where deep guano deposits accumulated, which were mined for about 20 years during the nineteenth century. The island has a tropical desert climate, with high daytime temperatures, constant wind, and intense sun. Nights, however, are quite cool. The ground is mostly sandy and reaches 23 feet (7.0 meters) at its highest point. The low-lying coral island has long been noted as hard to sight from small ships and is surrounded by a narrow fringing reef.

Jarvis Island is one of two United States territories that are in the Southern Hemisphere (the other is American Samoa). Located only 25 miles (40 km) south of the equator, Jarvis has no known natural freshwater lens and scant rainfall. This creates a very bleak, flat landscape without any plants larger than shrubs. There is no evidence that the island has ever supported a self-sustaining human population. Its sparse bunch grass, prostrate vines, and low-growing shrubs are primarily a nesting, roosting, and foraging habitat for seabirds, shorebirds, and marine wildlife.

Jarvis Island was submerged during the latest interglacial period, roughly 125,000 years ago, when sea levels were 5 to 10 meters (16 to 33 ft) higher than today. As the sea level declined, the horseshoe-shaped lagoon formed in Jarvis Island's center.

=== Topographic isolation ===
Jarvis Island's highest point has a topographic isolation of 380.57 kilometers (236.48 mi; 205.49 nmi), with Joe's Hill on Kiritimati being the nearest higher neighbor.

=== Time zone ===
Jarvis Island is located in the Samoa Time Zone (UTC -11:00), the same time zone as American Samoa, Kingman Reef, Midway Atoll, and Palmyra Atoll.

=== Birds ===
Jarvis Island once held some of the largest seabird breeding colonies in the tropical ocean. Still, guano mining and the introduction of rodents have ruined much of the island's native wildlife. Eight breeding species were recorded in 1982, compared to thirteen in 1996 and fourteen in 2004. The Polynesian storm petrel had made its return after over 40 years of absence from Jarvis Island, and the number of brown noddies multiplied from just a few birds in 1982 to nearly 10,000. Just twelve spectacled terns were recorded in 1982, but by 2004, over 200 nests were found there. The island, with its surrounding marine waters, has been recognized as an Important Bird Area (IBA) by BirdLife International because it supports colonies of lesser frigatebirds, brown and masked boobies, red-tailed tropicbirds, Polynesian storm petrels, blue noddies and sooty terns, as well as serving as a migratory stopover for bristle-thighed curlews.

== History ==
=== Prehistory ===
Jarvis Island is unlikely to have hosted permanent human occupation before its use for guano mining. However, it is possible the island was utilized as a waypoint or stopover island by Polynesian voyagers; it is 375 km (200 nmi) southwest of Kiritimati, which was used by them between c. 1250 and 1450 AD. The remoteness of the island and a lack of freshwater resources have prevented large-scale archaeological surveys from taking place.

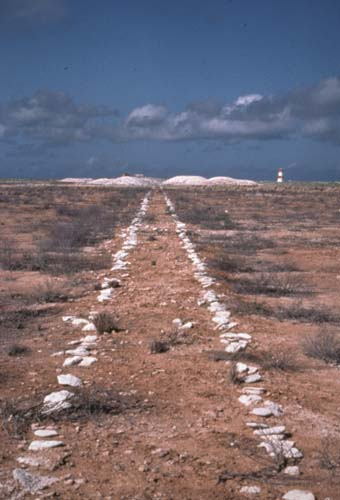
Remains of a guano tramway on Jarvis Island, looking west with 125-year-old heaps of mined but never-shipped guano in the background near the day beacon

=== Discovery ===
The island's first known sighting by the British on August 21, 1821, by the British ship Eliza Francis (or Eliza Frances) owned by Edward, Thomas and William Jarvis and commanded by Captain Brown. The island was visited by whaling vessels until the 1870s.

The U.S. Exploring Expedition surveyed the island in 1841. In March 1857 the island was claimed for the United States under the Guano Islands Act and formally annexed on February 27, 1858.

=== Nineteenth-century guano mining ===
The American Guano Company, incorporated in 1857, established claims regarding Baker Island and Jarvis Island, recognized under the U.S. Guano Islands Act of 1856. Beginning in 1858, several support structures were built on Jarvis Island, along with a two-story, eight-room "superintendent's house" featuring an observation cupola and wide verandahs. Tram tracks were laid down to bring mined guano to the western shore. One of the first loads was taken by Samuel Gardner Wilder. Laborers for the mining operations came from around the Pacific, including from Hawaiʻi; the Hawaiian laborers named Baker Island "Paukeaho", meaning 'out of breath' or 'exhausted', which is indicative of the hard work needed.

For the following 21 years, Jarvis was commercially mined for guano sent to the United States as fertilizer. The island was abruptly abandoned in 1879, leaving behind about a dozen buildings and 8,000 metric tons (8,800 short tons) of mined guano.

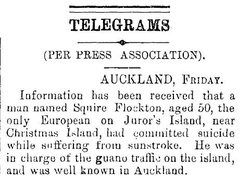
News story of Squire Flockton's death on Jarvis. The name Juror's Island in the article is a typographical error for Jarvis Island.

New Zealand entrepreneurs, including photographer Henry Winkelmann, then made unsuccessful attempts to continue guano extraction on Jarvis, and the two-story house was sporadically inhabited during the early 1880s. Squire Flockton was left alone on the island as caretaker for several months and committed suicide there in 1883, apparently from gin-fueled despair. His wooden grave marker was a carved plank which could be seen in the island's tiny four-grave cemetery for decades.

John T. Arundel & Co. resumed mining guano from 1886 to 1899. The United Kingdom annexed the island on June 3, 1889. Phosphate and copra entrepreneur John T. Arundel visited the island in 1909 on the maiden voyage of the S.S. Ocean Queen, and near the beach landing on the western shore, members of the crew built a pyramidal day beacon made from slats of wood, which was painted white. The beacon was standing in 1935, and remained until at least 1942.

=== Wreck of barquentine Amaranth ===
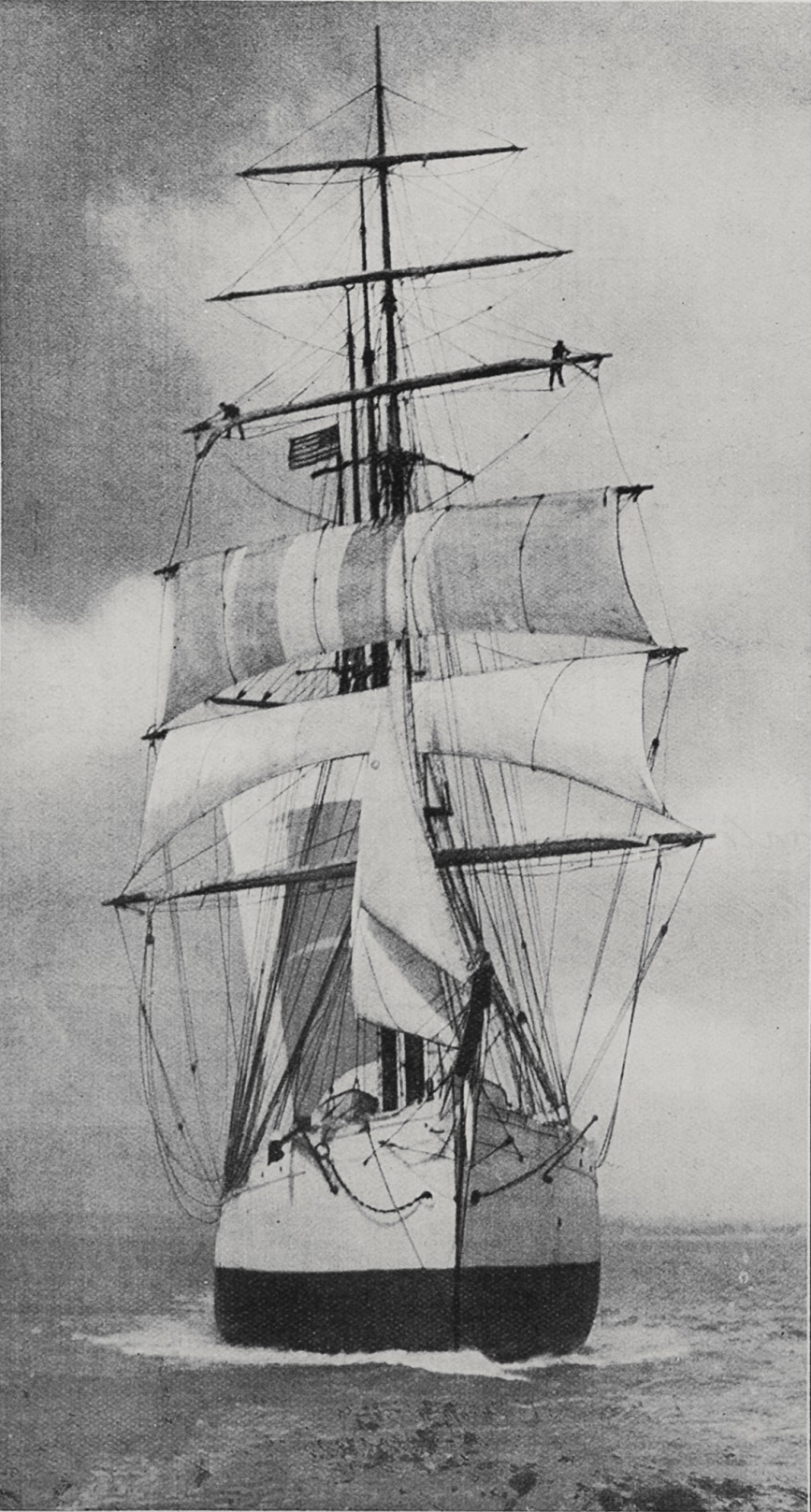
The Amaranth at sea

On August 30, 1913, the barquentine Amaranth (C. W. Nielson, captain) was carrying a cargo of coal from Newcastle, New South Wales, to San Francisco when it wrecked on Jarvis' southern shore. Ruins of ten wooden guano-mining buildings, the two-story house among them, could still be seen by the Amaranth crew, who left Jarvis aboard two lifeboats. One reached Pago Pago, American Samoa, and the other made Apia in Samoa. The ship's scattered remains were noted and scavenged for many years, and rounded fragments of coal from the Amaranth's hold were still being found on the south beach in the late 1930s.

=== Millersville (1935–1942) ===
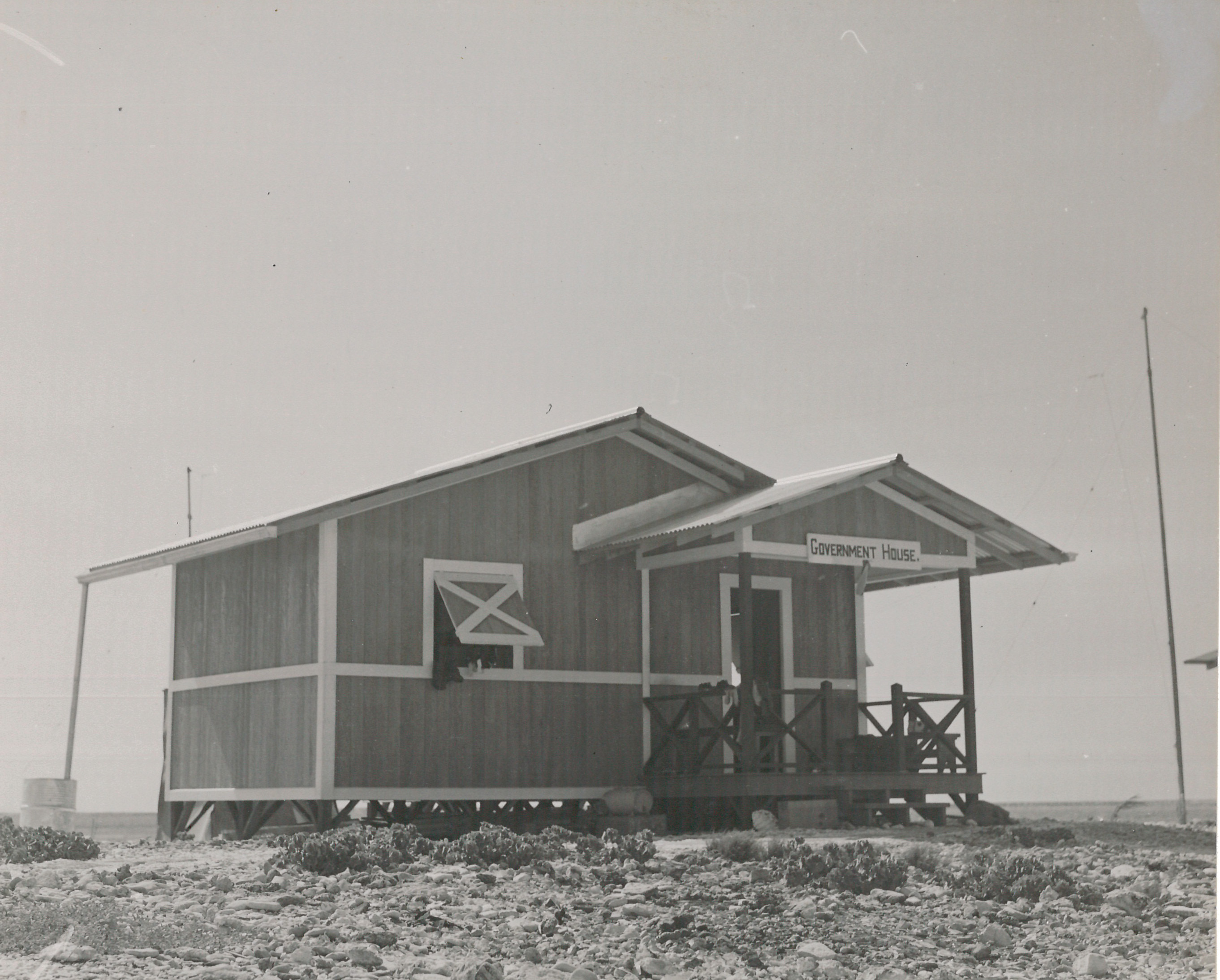
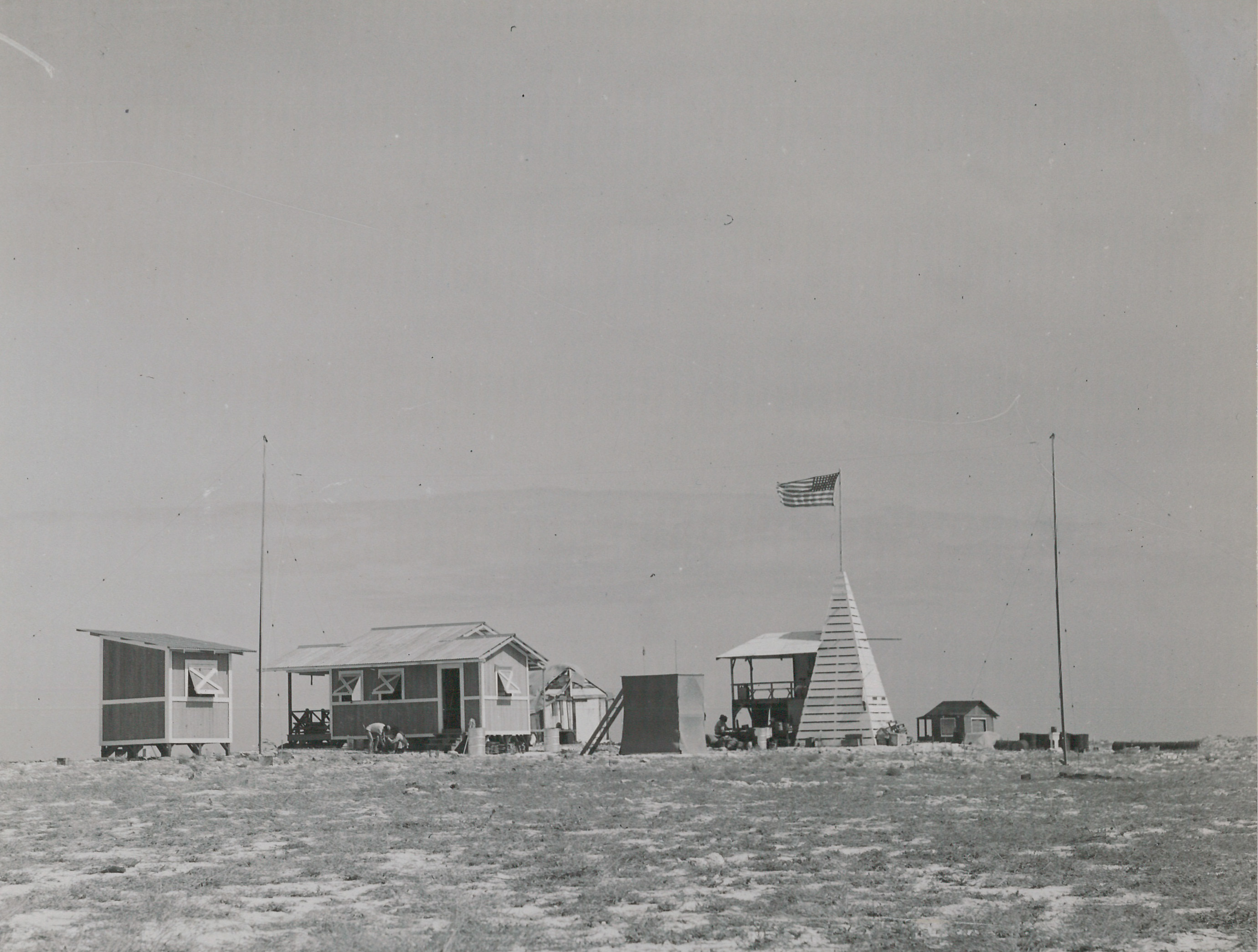
Settlers erected makeshift campsites on Jarvis Island during the American Equatorial Islands Colonization Project.

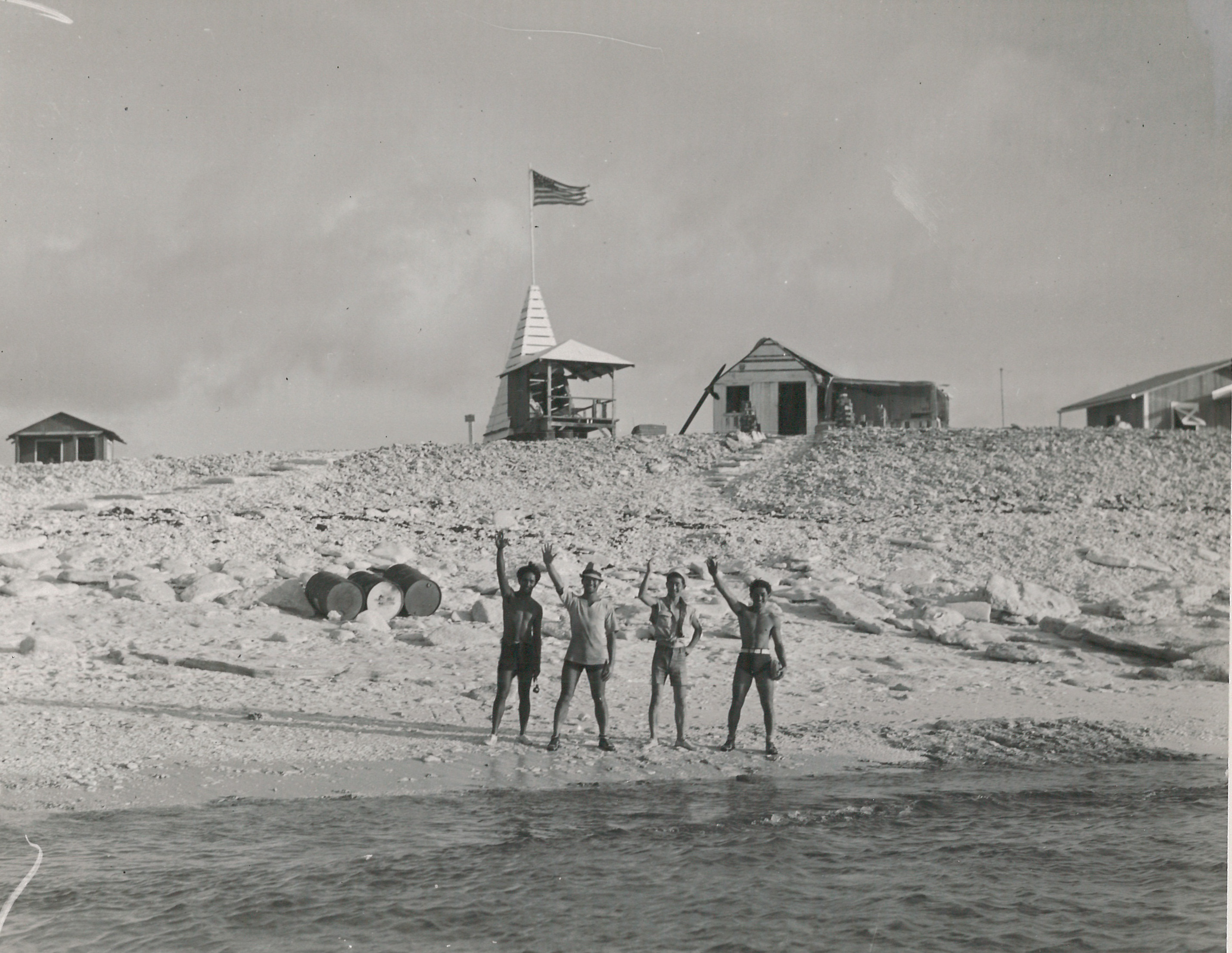
Four residents wave goodbye.

Jarvis Island was reclaimed by the United States government and colonized from March 26, 1935, onwards, under the American Equatorial Islands Colonization Project. President Franklin D. Roosevelt assigned administration of the island to the U.S. Department of the Interior on May 13, 1936. Starting as a cluster of large, open tents pitched next to the still-standing white wooden day beacon, the Millersville settlement on the island's western shore was named after a bureaucrat with the United States Department of Air Commerce. The settlement grew into a group of shacks built mostly with wreckage from the Amaranth (lumber from which was also used by the young Hawaiian colonists to build surfboards), but later, stone and wood dwellings were built and equipped with refrigeration, radio equipment, and a weather station. A crude aircraft landing area was cleared on the island's northeast side, and a T-shaped marker intended to be seen from the air was made from gathered stones, but no airplane is known to have ever landed there. According to the 1940 U.S. census, Jarvis Island had a population of three people.

At the beginning of World War II, an Imperial Japanese Navy submarine surfaced off the west coast of the island. Believing that a U.S. Navy submarine had come to fetch them, the four young colonists rushed down the steep western beach in front of Millersville towards the shore. The submarine answered their waves with fire from its deck gun, but no one was hurt in the attack. On February 7, 1942, the USCGC Taney evacuated the colonists, then shelled and burned the dwellings. The roughly cleared landing area on the island's northeast end was later shelled by the Japanese, leaving crater holes.

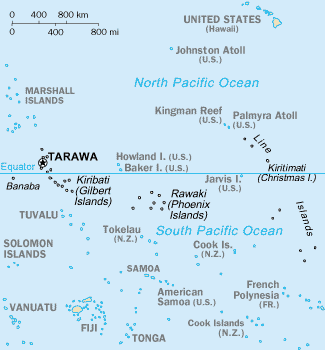
Map of the central Pacific Ocean showing Jarvis and neighboring islands.

=== International Geophysical Year ===
Jarvis was visited by scientists during the International Geophysical Year from July 1957 until November 1958. In January 1958, all scattered building ruins from the nineteenth-century guano diggings and the 1935–1942 colonization attempt were swept away without a trace by a severe storm that lasted several days and was witnessed by scientists. When the IGY research project ended, the island was abandoned again. By the early 1960s, a few sheds, a century of accumulated trash, the scientists' house from the late 1950s, and a solid, short lighthouse-like day beacon built two decades before were the only signs of human habitation on Jarvis.

== National Wildlife Refuge ==
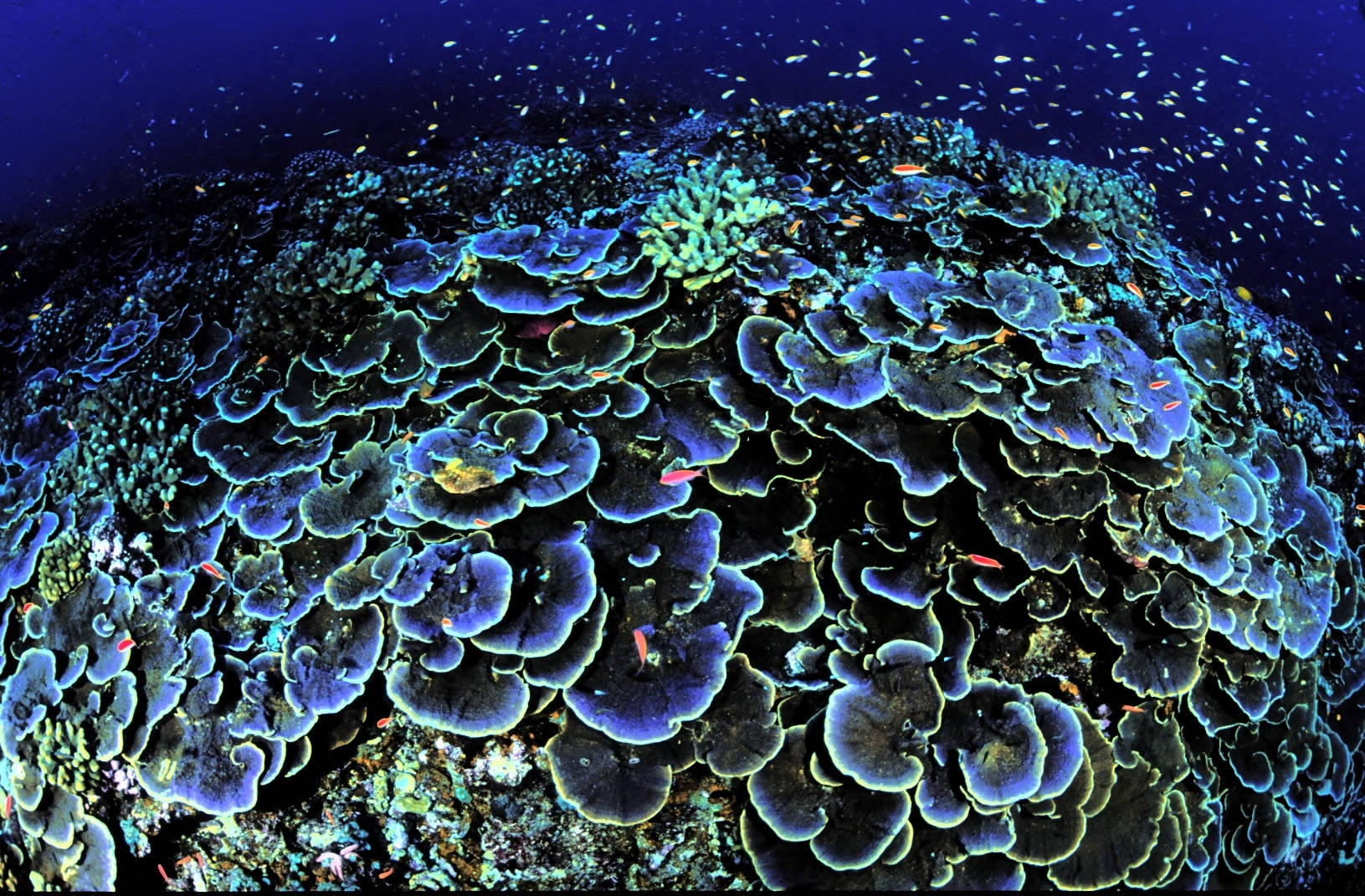
Coral at Jarvis Island National Wildlife Refuge

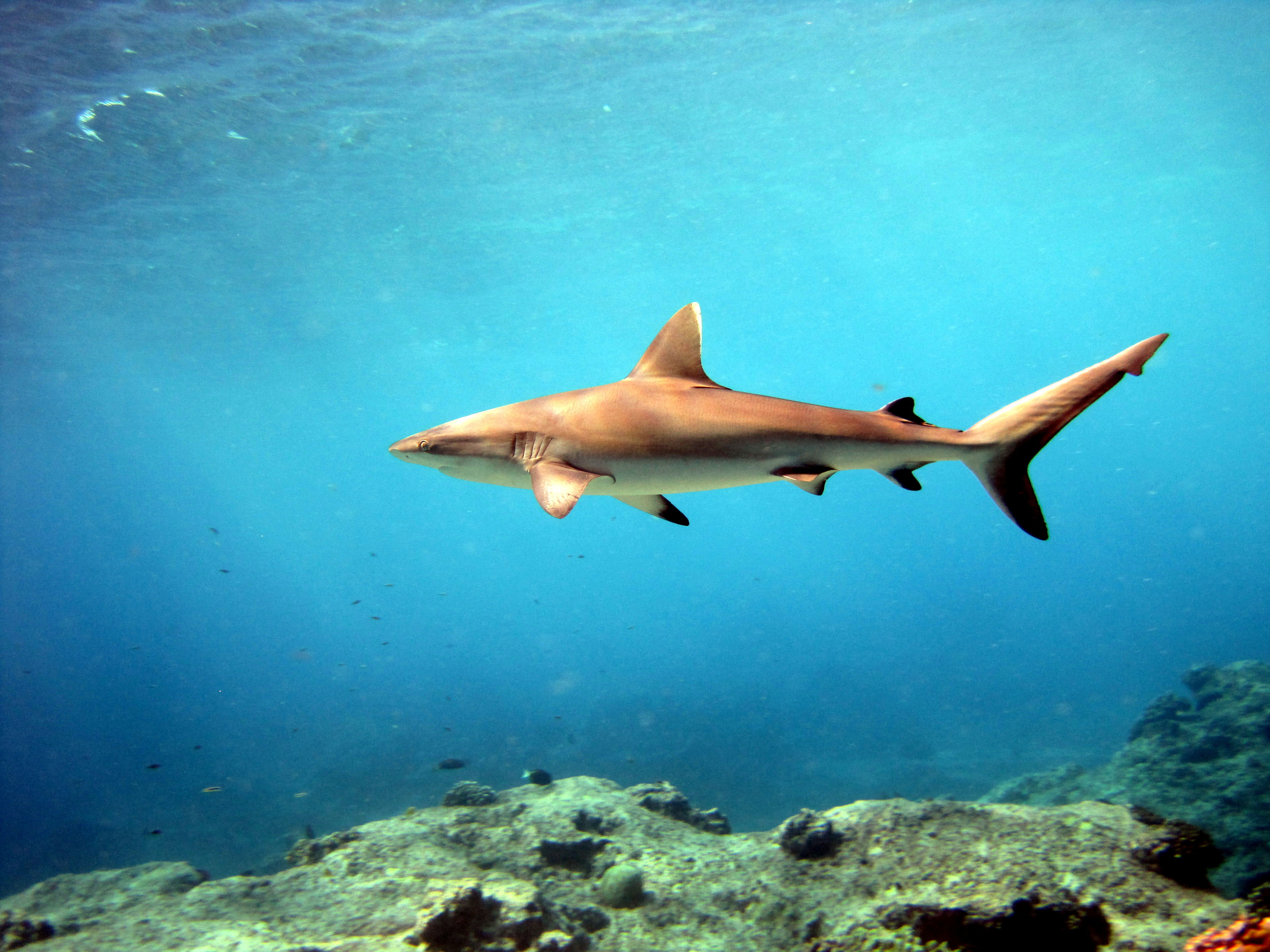
Grey reef shark in the waters of Jarvis Island

On June 27, 1974, Secretary of the Interior Rogers Morton created Jarvis Island National Wildlife Refuge, which was expanded in 2009 to add submerged lands within 12 nautical miles (22 km) of the island. The refuge now includes 1,273 acres (5.15 km^{2}) of land and 428,580 acres (1,734.4 km^{2}) of water. Along with six other islands, the island was administered by the U.S. Fish and Wildlife Service as part of the Pacific Remote Islands National Wildlife Refuge Complex. In January 2009, that entity was upgraded to the Pacific Remote Islands Marine National Monument by President George W. Bush.

A feral cat population, descendants of cats likely brought by colonists in 1937, wrought disruption to the island's wildlife and vegetation. Including the complete removal of rats, but not the mice, which had been introduced to the island previously. These cats were removed through efforts which began in the mid-1960s and lasted until 1990 when they were completely eradicated. Since cats were removed, seabird numbers and diversity have increased. Among the seabirds that returned to Jarvis Island with gray-backed terns rebuilding quickly and petrels taking longer to reestablish themselves on the island.

Nineteenth-century tram track remains can be seen in the dried lagoon bed at the island's center, and the late 1930s-era lighthouse-shaped day beacon still stands on the western shore at the site of Millersville.

Public entry to anyone, including U.S. citizens, on Jarvis Island requires a special-use permit and is generally restricted to scientists and educators. The U.S. Fish and Wildlife Service and the United States Coast Guard periodically visit Jarvis.

== Transportation ==
Jarvis Island Lighthouse
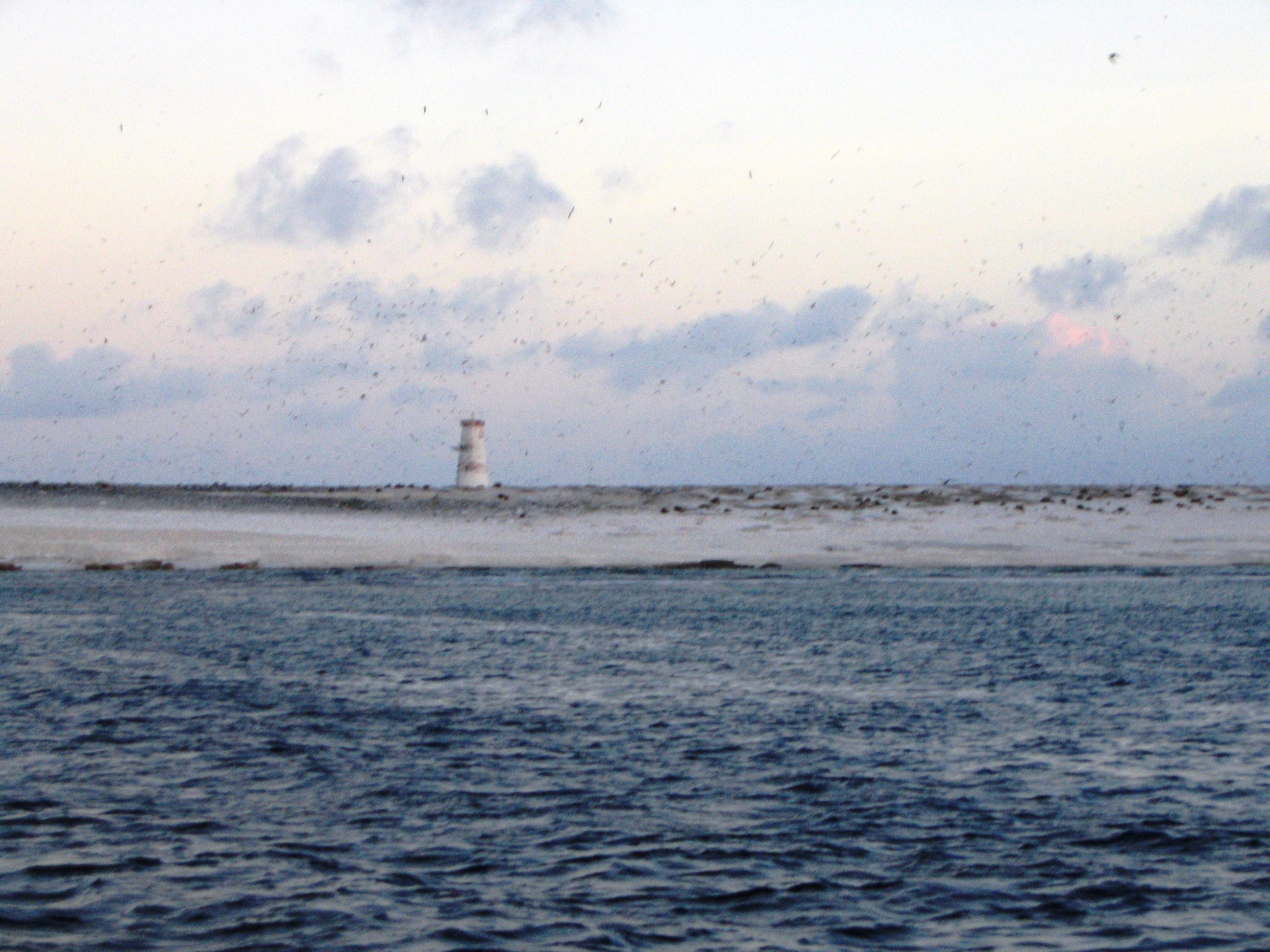
- Jarvis Island Light in 2003
- Location: Jarvis Island, Line Islands, United States
- Coordinates: 0°22′14″S 160°00′24″W

Tower
- Constructed: 1935
- Construction: masonry
- Height: 5 m (16 ft)
- Shape: circular truncated tower, no lantern
- Markings: Stripe (red, white, horizontal orientation)

Light
- Deactivated: 1942

There is no airport on the island, nor does the island contain any large terminal or port. A day beacon near the middle of the west coast is in poor condition and no longer painted. Some offshore anchorage is available.

== Military ==
As a U.S. territory, the defense of Jarvis Island is the responsibility of the United States. The laws of the United States apply when applicable.

== See also ==
- Howland and Baker islands
- List of Guano Island claims
- Under a Jarvis Moon, an 88-minute 2010 documentary
