= Noeline Kisembo Basemera =

Ugandan politician

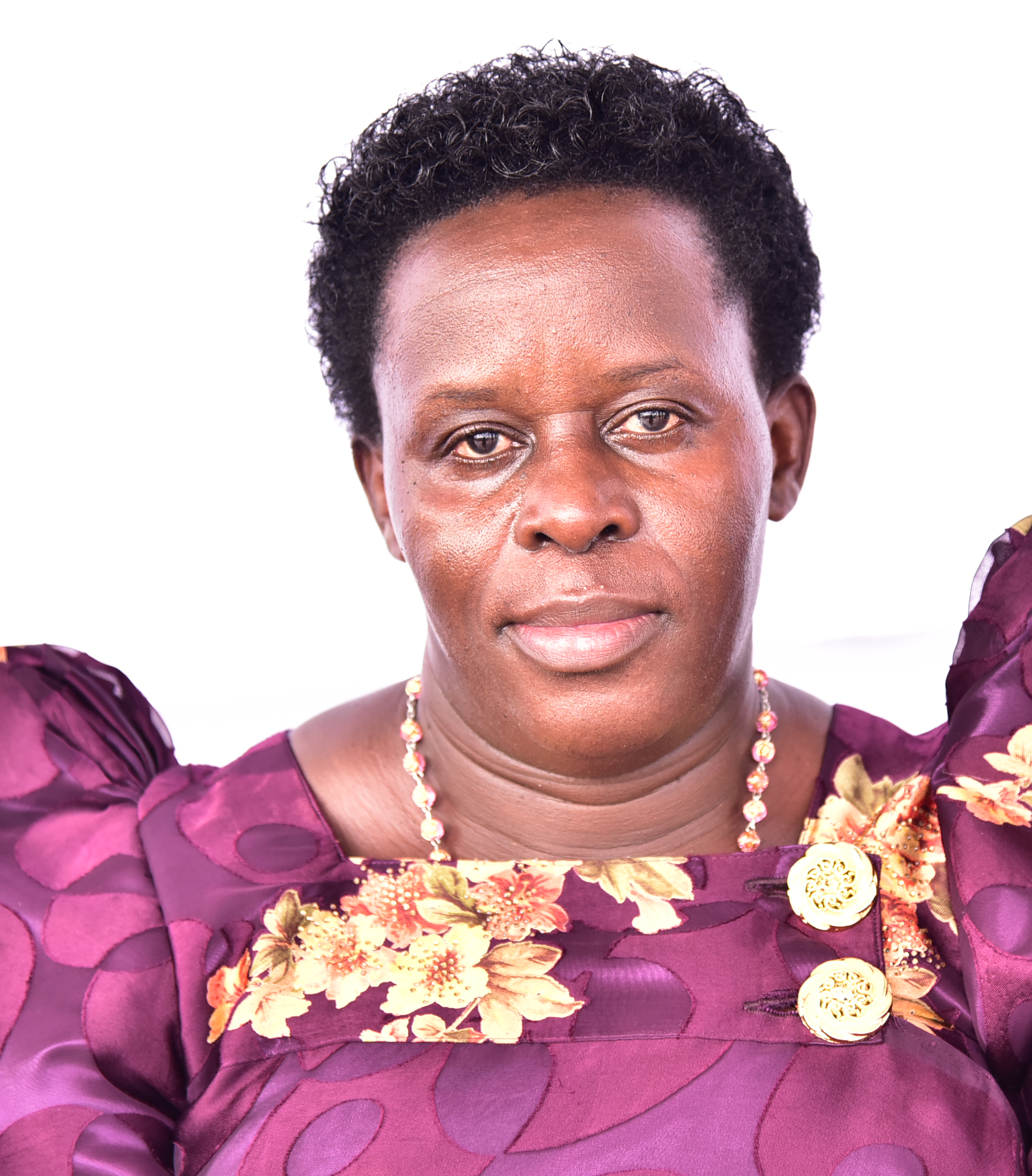

Member of Parliament for Kibaale District (Woman Representative)
- In office 2016–Incumbent

Personal details
- Born: 27 December 1973 (age 52) Uganda
- Party: National Resistance Movement (NRM)
- Education: Bachelor’s degree in Social Sciences, Makerere University, 1998; * Master’s degree in Development Studies, Makerere University, 2008
- Occupation: Politician, Legislator, Administrator
- Committees: Committee on East African Community Affairs

Noeline Kisembo Basemera (born 27 December 1973) is a Ugandan politician, legislator and an administrator. She was the Kibaale District woman member of parliament and a member of the National Resistance Movement(NRM) party, the party in political leadership in Uganda under the chairmanship of Yoweri Kaguta Museveni president of the republic of Uganda.

== Early life and education ==
Kisembo was born on 27 December 1973 started her primary education at muhorro primary school Kibale and completed her primary leaving examinations in 1987, she enrolled at Naigana secondary school for her O-level education and completed her Uganda Certificate of Education(UCE) in 1991, she thereafter joined st Andrea Kaahwas college hoima for her A-level education where she completed her Uganda Advanced Certificate of Education(UACE) in 1994. She later joined Makerere University and graduated with a bachelor's degree in Social sciences in 1998 and later added master's degree in development studies in 2008

== Career ==
Kisembo has been Kibale woman member of parliament from 2016 to date.

She worked with Uganda Kolping society as deputy executive director from 2003 to 2016, education coordinator from 1999 to 2003 and assistant education Coordinator from 1996 to 1999.

In parliament she serves on the committee on east African community affairs. She is also a member of the Uganda Woman Parliamentary Association (UWOPA).
