= Ujah Uloko =

Nigerian footballer

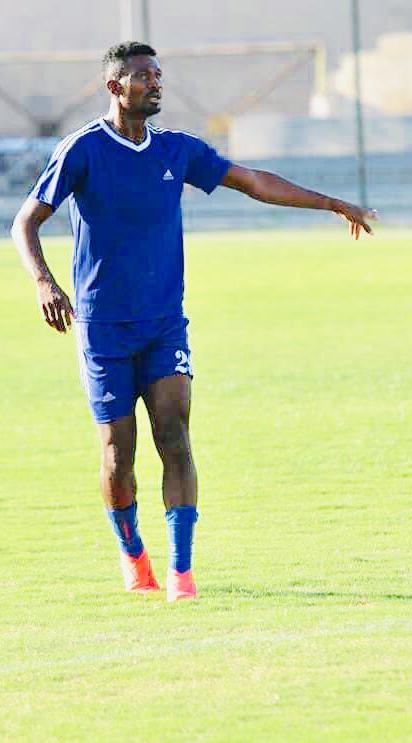

Personal information
- Full name: Ujah Uloko
- Date of birth: 10 August 1999 (age 27)
- Place of birth: Kaduna, Nigeria
- Height: 1.90 m (6 ft 3 in)
- Position: Centre-back

Team information
- Current team: Al Ramadi FC
- Number: 14

Senior career*
| Years | Team | Apps | (Gls) |
| 2017–2018 | Nasarawa United | 19 | (2) |
| 2019–2020 | Katsina United | 9 | (0) |
| 2020–2021 | Al-Nasiriya | 24 | (1) |
| 2021-present | Al Ramadi FC | 8 | (0) |
- * Club domestic league appearances and goals as of 20:03, 2021 (UTC)

Ujah Uloko (born 10 August 1999) is a Nigerian professional footballer who plays as a centre-back for Iraqi Premier League club Al Ramadi FC.

== Club career ==
Uloko signed for Nigerian Premier League side Nasarawa United in July 2018. After impressing in two seasons, he joined Nigerian Premier League side Katsina United on a 6-month deal. He then moved abroad and signed with Iraqi side Al-Nasiriya in September 2020, he served as captain of the club. During the summber transfer window of 2021, he joined Iraqi Premier League club Al Ramadi FC.
