= Noelle Sandwith =

- Born: Noelle Ora Sandwith; 31 July 1927; Cape Town, Union of South Africa
- Died: 21 April 2006 (aged 78); England, United Kingdom
- Education: Kingston School of Art; Croydon School of Art; Heatherley School of Fine Art
- Known for: Sketches

Noelle Ora Sandwith (31 July 1927 – 21 April 2006) was a South African-born English artist. The great-great-granddaughter of the surgeon William Marsden, she trained in art schools of London before earning employment sketching portraits of motion picture personalities. Sandwith hitchhiked the Birdsville Track from August 1952 to February 1953 and sketched its people before travelling to the South Pacific. In 1954, she was the first person to produce a portrait of Sālote Tupou III, Queen of Tonga. A year later, Sandwith returned to England to train to become a nurse, remaining in the health industry until 1979.

== Early life and education ==
Sandwith was born in Cape Town in the Union of South Africa on 31 July 1927. She was the daughter of the English authors and photojournalists Francis and Frieda Johnson Sandwith. Among her ancestors were the surgeon William Marsden (her great, great-grandfather) and also the poet Matthew Arnold. Sandwith was brought up in Carshalton, Surrey. She was trained in the arts at the Kingston School of Art from 1944 to 1945, the Croydon School of Art in 1946, and the Heatherley School of Fine Art between 1947 and 1948. During this period, Sandwith became proficient in sketching poses of humans and learning about the human form.

== Career ==
Her first job was with a small advertising agency, where she sketched portraits of motion-picture personalities from publicity photographs, which were displayed in cinemas for promotional purposes. In 1950 at the age of 23, Sandwith flew to Sydney to meet her uncle, and she later accompanied him to an embarkment to Tonga from 1950 to 1951. She completed several paintings of the country before returning to Sydney to seek employment. Resisting pressure from her family to return to England, Sandwith hitchhiked along the Birdsville Track, a cattle route linking Queensland and South Australia, between August 1952 to February 1953. She used public transport and hitched trucks to reach some of its remote areas. During her journey, Sandwith sketched the Aboriginal peoples, sheep shearers, landladies, and fellow travellers, mostly in pencil but occasionally in pastel.

The journalist of The Sydney Morning Herald wrote that Sandwith had realised she "stumbled on a part of the world that had never been adequately documented" and her work became "an incredible record of the harsh outback landscape – and the characters, white and black, who called it home." She subsequently travelled to Fiji, Samoa, and the Pitcairn Islands in 1953. Sandwith returned to Tonga to teach English at the Free Church of Tonga, and lived with a Tongan family, during her work to sketch and record the islanders' culture, earning her the name "The Drawing Girl". In 1954, she persuaded Sālote Tupou III to sit for a portrait, the first of a queen of Tonga, after a cabinet meeting of Tongan nobles convened to grant her permission for the painting.

Sandwith returned to England in 1955 and lived in London. She decided to train to become a nurse, enrolling at the Royal Free Hospital from 1956 to 1959. After completing her training, Sandwith worked as a staff nurse at the St Mary's Hospital between 1962 and 1963. She continued to exhibit her sketches during this period, at the Royal Society of British Artists, the Society of Women Artists, and the Brighton Museum & Art Gallery. Sandwith spent part of 1965 sketching in Canada and also worked as a nurse in British Columbia. She later returned to London and attained employment as a health visitor in the Borough of Newham from 1972 to 1975 and Redbridge and Waltham Forest between 1975 and 1979. Sandwith continued to visit unusual places and took up courses in drawing and design and also garnered an interest in etching on copper. She eschewed photography of human subjects as she believed draughtsmanship captured better details and delivered spontaneity.

== Final years and death ==
In 1993 she donated 105 sketches of her work and photographs and letters in the Birdsville Track to the National Archives of Australia. She subsequently became affected by Alzheimer's disease and was taken to a care home. In 2005 the National Museum of Australia mounted Sandwith's work on display In Search of the Birdsville Track and the exhibition toured Australia. She died on 21 April 2006.
