= Marie-Noëlle Warot-Fourdrignier =

French footballer (born 1956)

Personal information
- Date of birth: 23 December 1956 (age 69)
- Position: Defender

Senior career*
Years	Team	Apps	(Gls)
1976–1982	AS Étrœungt		
1985–1986	AC Cambrai		

International career
1977–1986	France	21	(0)
- * Club domestic league appearances and goals

Marie-Noëlle Warot-Fourdrignier (born 23 December 1956) is a French former footballer. She played for AS Étrœungt and later also for AC Cambrai.

== National team ==
Warot-Fourdrignier represented France, from 1977 to 1986 she played in the France national women's football team 21 times.
