= Noella Uloko =

Nigerian singer-songwriter and recording artist

Noelle Uloko
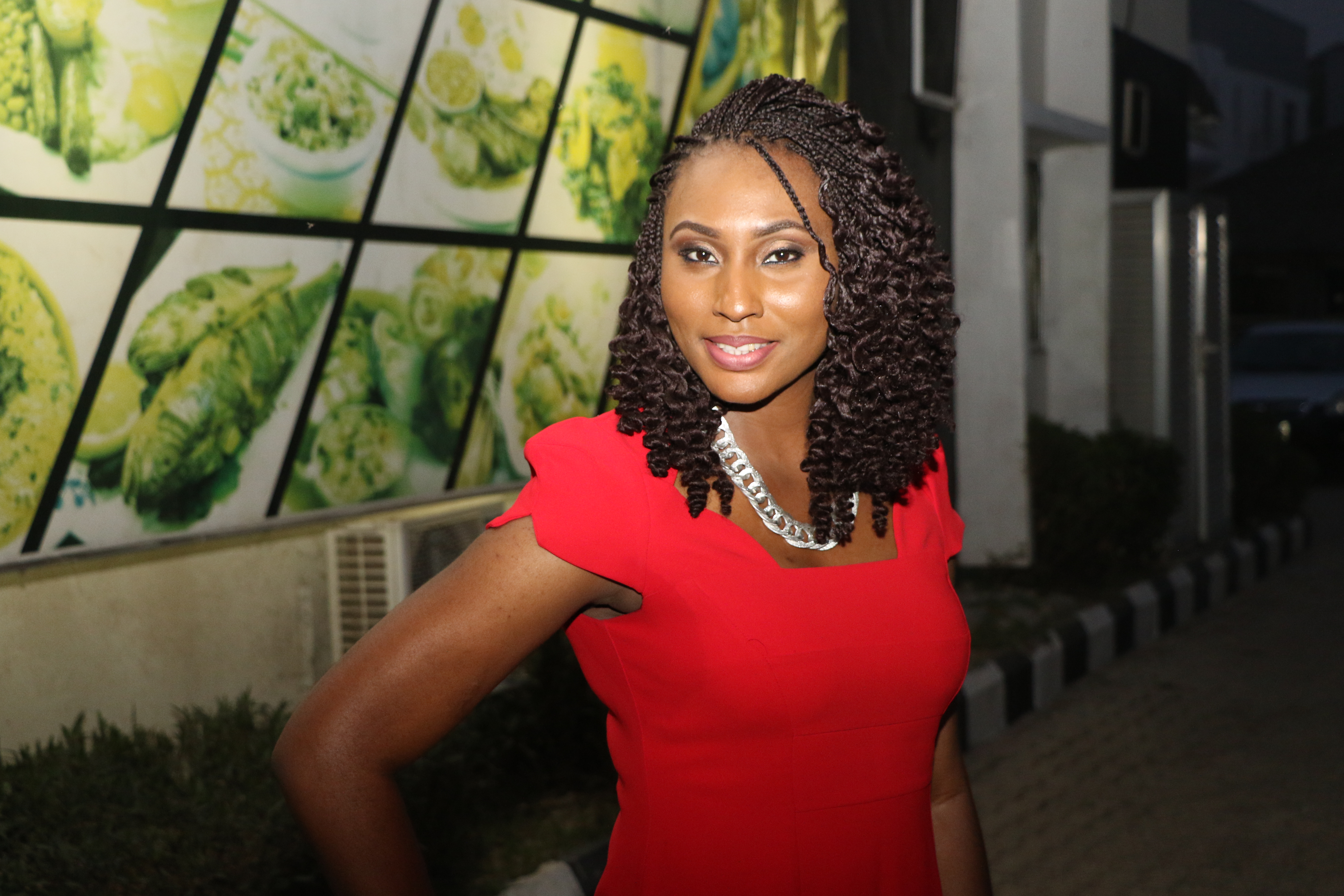
- Noella Uloko in Abuja, Nigeria

Background information
- Also known as: Noelle
- Born: Noella "Noelle" Uloko; 26 April 1989 (age 37)
- Origin: Benue, Nigeria
- Genres: Christian hip hop, gospel
- Occupations: Singer-songwriter, musician
- Instruments: Vocals, Guitar
- Years active: 2013–present

Noella "Noelle" Uloko (born 26 April 1989) is a Nigerian contemporary Christian singer-songwriter and recording artist from Benue State.
