= Noël (singer) =

American singer

Noël is an American singer. Originally a model based in Los Angeles, she was eventually noticed by brothers Ron and Russell Mael of the band Sparks who promoted her as a singer. The duo wrote and produced her debut, the disco album Is There More to Life Than Dancing?, released by Virgin Records in 1979.

Her next album, Peer Pressure, was released on March 29, 1982 on the Scotti Brothers label and was credited as Noël and the Red Wedge. This time, it was produced by Ron Kramer and Mitchell Froom (of Gamma), the latter of whom also played keyboards. Since then, she has remained relatively anonymous, playing in various jazz groups. Her real-life identity has not been publicly revealed.

== Discography ==
=== Studio albums ===
List of studio albums, with relevant details
Title	Details	Chart positions	
Title	Details	SCO	UK Indie
Is There More to Life Than Dancing?	Released: 1979; Label: Virgin	74	32
Peer Pressure (as Noël and the Red Wedge)	Released: March 29, 1982; Label: Scotti Brothers	—	—

=== Singles ===
List of singles with relevant details
Year	Title	Chart positions	Album	Ref.
Year	Title	US D-P	Album	Ref.
1979	"Dancing Is Dangerous"	91	Is There More to Life Than Dancing?	
1979	"I Want a Man" b/w "Dancing Is Dangerous"	—	Is There More to Life Than Dancing?	
1979	"The Night They Invented Love" / "Au Revoir"	—	Is There More to Life Than Dancing?	
1982	"Special to You" b/w "Lovemaker"	—	Peer Pressure	
1982	"She's a Big Girl Now" b/w "Peer Pressure"	—	Peer Pressure	
