= Noela =

Noela is a feminine given name. It is a variant of Noel.

Notable people and characters with the name include:

- Noela Mae Evangelista, Filipino beauty pageant contestant
- Noela Hjorth (1940–2016), Australian artist
- Noela Rukundo, Burundian–Australian woman known for crashing her own funeral
- Noela Young (1930–2018), Australian children's book illustrator
- Noela, a character from Drugstore in Another World

== See also ==
- Nõela, village in Tartu Parish, Tartu County, Estonia
