= Noel (given name) =

Name list

Noël
- Pronunciation: (Noel) English: /ˈnoʊl/, (Noël) English: /noʊˈɛl/ French: [nɔɛl]
- Gender: Unisex

Origin
- Origin: French
- Meaning: Christmas, Christmas carol
- Region of origin: Europe

Other names
- Related names: Nowell, Noelle

Noel or Noël is a given name, often given to both girls and boys born over the Christmas period.

Noel derives from the Old French "Noël", meaning "Christmas". It is a variant (and later replacement) of "nael", which itself comes from the Latin natalis, meaning "birth". The term natalis dies (birth day) is Church Latin in reference to Christmas, the birthday of Christ. In modern English, a Noel can also refer to a Christmas carol. The spelling with a diaeresis over the "e" (Noël) is used to indicate that the two vowels are pronounced separately rather than as a diphthong.

Other nicknames and modern variations include Noele, Noeline, Nowell, Noela, Noell, Noella, Noelene, Noeleen, and Noelle/Noëlle (French, feminine).

== People ==
- Noël (singer), American disco singer
- Noel Agazarian (1916–1941), British pilot
- Noël Alexandre (1639–1724), French theologian, author, and ecclesiastical historian
- Noël Atom (b. 2005), German footballer
- Noel Barrionuevo (b. 1984), Argentine female professional field hockey player and Olympian
- Noel Bauldeweyn (c. 1480–1513), Franco-Flemish composer
- Noel Blanc (b. 1938), American voice actor, son of Mel Blanc
- Noel Cabangon (b. 1963), Filipino singer
- Noel Chambers (1923–1990), New Zealand swimmer
- Noel Chavasse (1884–1917), British medical officer and decorated hero
- Noel Clarke (b. 1975), English actor and writer
- Noël Coward (1899–1973), British actor, playwright, and popular music composer
- Noel Devine (b. 1988), American football player
- Noel Dyson (1916–1995), British actress
- Noel Edmonds (b. 1948), British television presenter and DJ
- Noel Emmanuel (b. 1960), 6th Bishop of Trincomalee
- Noel Scott Engel (1943–2019), birth name of Scott Walker, American singer
- Noel Fielding (b. 1973), British comedian and television actor
- Noel Fisher (b. 1984), Canadian actor
- Noel Francis (c. 1906–1959), American actress
- Noel Gallagher (b. 1967), English musician
- Noel V. Ginnity (fl. 1957–2020's), Irish comedian
- Noël Godin (b. 1945), Belgian writer
- Noel Gunler (born 2001), Swedish ice hockey player
- Noel Harrison (1934–2013), British actor and singer
- Noel Hasa (born 2003), Finnish footballer
- Noel Hill (musician) (born 1958), Irish concertina player
- Noel Hood (1909–1979), British actress
- Noel Jenke (1946–2020), American football player
- Noel King (footballer) (b. 1956), Republic of Ireland U-21s football manager
- Noel LaMontagne (b. 1977), American football player
- Noel Langley (1911–1980), South African novelist, screenwriter and director
- Noel León (born 2004), Mexican racing driver
- Noël Leslie, Countess of Rothes (1878–1956), British philanthropist and social leader, heroine of the Titanic disaster
- Noel MacNeal (b. 1961), American puppeteer
- Noel Manoukian (1938–2019), justice of the Supreme Court of Nevada
- Noël Martin (1959–2020), British activist and neo-Nazi attack victim
- Noel Neill (1920–2016), American actress
- Noel Pagan or Noel, American freestyle musician
- Noël Rakotondramboa, Malagasy politician
- Noel Redding (1945–2003), English guitarist and bassist
- Noël Regney (1922–2002), French songwriter
- Noel Nudo Rivera (born 1968), Filipino politician and businessman
- Noel Rosa (1910–1937), Brazilian songwriter and musician
- Noel Rosal (b. 1964), Filipino politician
- Shirogane Noel, Japanese VTuber
- Noel Stanton (1926–2009), English religious leader, founder of the Jesus Army
- Noel Stockdale (1920–2004), English businessman
- Noel Paul Stookey (b. 1937), American folk musician
- Noel Streatfeild (1895–1986), British author (Ballet Shoes)
- Noel Sullivan (b. 1980), Welsh singer and actor
- Noel Toy (1918–2003), American burlesque performer and actress
- Noel Thatcher, British Paralympic athlete
- Noel Walsh (1935–2020), Irish Gaelic footballer, administrator, selector, manager and member of the Defence Forces
- Noel Whelan (b. 1974), English professional footballer
- Noel Whelan (1968–2019), Irish politician and psephologist
- Noël Wells (b. 1986), American comedian and actress
- Noel Wimalasena (1914–1994), Sri Lankan Sinhala diplomat, 1st Governor of Sabaragamuwa Province, Sri Lanka

== Fictional characters ==
- Noël (comics), a character and comics series by André Franquin
- Noel (mermaid), in the manga and anime series Mermaid Melody Pichi Pichi Pitch
- Noel Corson, one of the titular villains in Verna M. Raynor's 1899 play Noel Corson's Oath; or Leonia's Repentance
- Noel Crane, a character from the TV series Felicity
- Noel K. Ehrlichkeit, in the video game Triangle Heart
- Noel Gruber, a character in the musical Ride the Cyclone
- Noel Kreiss, in the video game Final Fantasy XIII-2
- Noël Kannagi, in the anime Sora No Woto
- Noel Seeker, in the video game series The Legend of Heroes: Trails to Azure
- Noel Shempsky, in the television series Frasier
- Noël Takao, in the Super Sentai series Lupinranger VS Patranger
- Noel Vermillion in the fighting game series BlazBlue

== In names for Santa Claus ==
- Père Noël, the French equivalent to Santa Claus, literally translated "Father Christmas"
- Papá Noel, the Spanish and Latin American equivalent
- Pare Noel, the Catalan-speaking regions' equivalent
- Papai Noel, the Brazilian equivalent
- Baba Noel, the Assyrian and Arabic equivalent
- Ông già Noel, the Vietnamese equivalent

== See also ==
- Noelle
