= Nolle =

Nolle or Nölle may refer to:

- Nolle prosequi, legal Latin term for the discontinuance of a prosecution
- Marianne Nölle (born 1938), German serial killer
- Thomas Nölle (1948–2020), German artist
- Richard Nolle, American astrologer, coiner of the term "supermoon"
- Nollendorfplatz, colloquially called Nolle, a square in Berlin, Germany
- Nolle, a district of Dissen, Lower Saxony, Germany

== See also ==
- Noll (disambiguation)
- Nolly (disambiguation)
