= Nolly =

Nolly may refer to:-

- Jay Nolly, American soccer player
- Noele Gordon, English actress nicknamed Nolly
- Nolly (TV series), about English actress Noele Gordon
- Adam "Nolly" Getgood, musician who played for Periphery (band)

== See also ==
- Nolle (disambiguation)
