= Thomas Nölle =

German artist & photographer (1948–2020)

- Born: 2 December 1948; Soest, Germany
- Died: 3 June 2020 (aged 71); Badalona (Barcelona), Spain
- Occupations: Visual artist and photographer
- Known for: Photography, painting, collage, sculpture, assemblage, environmental art, mixed media, video, installation, action art and intervention in public space
- Website: http://www.thomas-noelle.net

© Thomas Nölle, Vilassar de Mar, 2016

Thomas Nölle (Soest, Germany, December 2, 1948 – Badalona (Barcelona), Spain, June 3, 2020) was a visual artist. He was born in the German city of Soest, in Westphalia. Nölle's experimental drive facilitated his work in various disciplines and with a diversity of techniques, including photography, painting, collage, sculpture, assemblage, environment art, mixed media, video, installation art, action art and interventions in public space.

In 2026, Spain's national broadcaster RTVE, on its programme ‘Metrópolis’, produced and screened a special documentary focusing on the artist — “The Legacy of Thomas Nölle” — which offered a comprehensive overview of his work, guided by interviews with Nölle himself and featuring contributions from various experts. It includes previously unseen footage of the artist. It can be viewed online on RTVE Play.

In the words of the programme’s director, Susana Blas, “Metrópolis delves into the heart of Nölle’s work, revealing to new generations a vast conceptual studio and a prodigious sensibility capable of finding beauty in the remnants of history”.

== Life ==
In 1970, during his university studies, he moved to Bonn, where he had his first artist studio while studying Education at the Universität Rheinische Friedrich-Wilhelms. Starting in 1988 he made frequent trips to Barcelona and set up his studio in the city's Gothic Quarter in 1989. In 2010 he moved his studio to Vilassar de Mar (Barcelona), while throughout his lifetime he lived for various periods in Brazil, Portugal and Germany.

Art historian Jürgen Pech wrote that "Thomas Nölle belongs to two cultures, European and non-European, a circumstance that is evident in his work."

== Work ==
Thomas Nölle's earliest experience with art was through photography. He had his first exhibition of photography at the age of 15, and from the mid-70s onwards he worked as a visual artist in the broadest variety of fields, in a transdisciplinary manner. He would frequently interweave diverse techniques and materials.

Thomas Nölle developed personal styles throughout his career, always maintaining his freedom and independence from artistic trends. The foundation of his work is in the experiential observation of the world and of human nature, as well as the temporal connections of history, developing a broad thematic network with multi-referential meanings.

From his earliest work he focused his conceptual interest on socio-political, cultural and environmental questions, with an avant la lettre ecological spirit. The main thematic areas of his artistic practice from his earliest period until his final works were, on the one hand, an unequivocal social focus, with a critical vision of the impact on nature of industrialisation and the excesses of consumer society; power conflicts in interactions between cultures and social strata, especially in colonialism and neo-colonialism. On the other hand, he reflected deeply on the context of art, as well as on the interrelation between art, life, memory and history.

Experimentation with the greatest diversity of supports, techniques and materials was characteristic of his working praxis, distinguished as it was by an ongoing search for renewed paths and hybrid methods. In the area of photography, his experimentalism was also a constant factor, as he generally used technique in a processual and serialised manner, always in correlation with the subjects or motifs he was working on.

Lux 48 - Acervo Giannetti Nölle, established in 2025 and based in Madrid, is responsible for the conservation, cataloguing, digitisation and dissemination of Nölle’s work. The Acervo is working on the gradual publication of the volumes of the Catalogue Raisonné of Thomas Nölle’s complete artworks, organised chronologically. The archive has published an extensive Monograph on the artist online.

=== First period: 1960s to 1980s ===
In 1978 Nölle celebrated an individual exhibition at the Kurhaus Dangast, which was known at the time as the gathering place of the Oldenburg Free Academy revolving around the figure of Joseph Beuys.

His numerous travels in European cities in the 1960s and 1970s, including Pompey, Paris and London, and in countries all over the world, including Greece, Russia, India, Egypt and in the Caribbean, left their mark from the start and were often the subject of his photographic work. In the period 1979 to 1981 he set off on a long journey through various countries in South America, including Peru, Bolivia, Paraguay and Brazil. Over this period he created photographic series and photo-performance work with a strongly social orientation, as seen in his exhibition, Notes on South America – A Journey | 1979–1981, at Casa de América, Madrid (6.02 – 28.03.2020): "The subjects made manifest in the photographs of this period from 1979 to 1981 reveal a gaze focused on the social sphere, but also on environmental problems and the relationships between human beings and nature." These series were reproduced in his last artist book Notes from South America – A Journey | 1979–1981 (2020).

Upon his return to Germany from his journey through South America, Nölle settled again in Bonn, carrying out intense artistic activity. Between 1983 and 1990 he devoted especially to large-format painting and photo-collage. During the 1980s he exhibited in various solo and group shows in Germany, with the following highlights: Kunsthistorisches Institut, Bonn, Yves Klein, Amongst Others (Solo, 1983); Kunstverein Bonn (1984), with the participation amongst other of Jean Tinguely, who was also involved in his action Das ist doch keine Art [That's no Art/no Way] together with Jürgen Pech; Kunstmuseum Düsseldorf together with Joseph Beuys, Niki de Saint Phalle, Jürgen Klauke and Robert Rauschenberg, amongst others. In Düsseldorf he carried his public action Art is Health – Remember Yves Klein (1984), a phrase that was printed onto the tramways moving about the city. As was the case for Yves Klein, whose work was a point of reference for Nölle, art and life constituted for him an inseparable dynamic unity.

His individual exhibition in the Orangerie Schloss Augustusburg in Brühl, Room to Move (1988), brought together the majority of his large-format pictorial work on the period 1985–1988, and featured a site-specific installation of the same name on the subject of the frontiers of knowledge. His painting addresses subjects related to the fragility of memory, the fragmentation of history and human limitations. Dominated by earth tones, his paintings use overlayered material substrates upon which he inscribes figures and symbolic shapes. In 1991 he published a monographic catalogue of the pictorial work done in the period 1985–1991.

=== Themes: colonialism and neo-colonialism ===
Colonisation, neo-colonialism and the confrontations between cultures were amongst the subjects addressed by Nölle in various works, such as the series of photo-performance and electrographs entitled Um índio em Brasília [A Native in Brasília] (1980), or in the painting and mixed media series Mundus Novus (1990) on the colonisation of Latin America, exhibited in several solo shows e.g. at the Friedrich Naumann Foundation, Königswinter, and the Städtischen Galerie Suhl, Germany.

He returned to the subject of neo-colonialism in extensive series of photographs and video art produced from 2002 to 2008 which deal critically with racism, discrimination, forced acculturalisation and the loss of memory, especially in relation to indigenous and African peoples. These works were shown in 2008 in the solo exhibition Tiempos Dorados [Golden Times] at the MEIAC, Ibero-American Museum of Contemporary Art, in Badajoz, Spain, curated by Nilo Casares, with the publication of a monographic catalogue. In 2015 a selection of this series was exhibited in Künstlerhaus Wien, Vienna, as part of the exhibition Über: ich [About: Me], curated by Eugenia Gortchokova.

=== Themes: art, nature, ecology and society ===
"A slap in the face, with works that would go against every convention of art", wrote a German critic in an article on a 1977 Nölle exhibition in Soest, which dealt with the human and environmental damage caused by the excesses of consumer society and industrialisation.

Giving continuity to his intensely ongoing work exploring the relationships between art, nature, ecology and society begun in the 1970s, after his journey through South America in 1979-1981, and especially with his experiences in Brazil, he focused his gaze on the connection between deforestation and the extermination of indigenous peoples. In an interview with Ángel Antonio Rodríguez, Nölle affirmed:

"It was there where I became fully aware of the great problem of the environmental destruction of the Amazon and its indigenous peoples. For me it became synonymous with the destruction of the entire planet. In fact, from the very beginning of my artistic work the ecological aspect has taken on a highly important role, always in relation to human development and never as an isolated phenomenon." (Thomas Nölle)

His work in urban and marine archaeology was one of the most remarkable and emblematic aspects of his oeuvre from 1989 on. On Barcelona beaches and especially at Barceloneta, Nölle systematically gathered and collected organic materials, residues and rubbish of all kinds, polished over decades by the salt water and tidal movements. Starting in 1990 these found objects were then used in various formats in his production dedicated to the connection between art, ecology and memory, including art boxes, mosaics, assemblages, environments and public art actions.

One of the most representative works of his critique and reflection on the consequences of capitalist modes of production and unsustainable consumption on the environment, the marine ecosystem and on the life of all species, including humans, was the kinetic installation Musée Méditerranée (2000-2002). It was exhibited in at the MUVIM Museum of Valencia (Observatori III, Spain, 2002), the Museum of Contemporary Art of Ibiza (2004), at the Re:NEW Festival (Pittsburgh, USA, 2016) and in the CCCB-Contemporary Culture Centre of Barcelona (DrapArt'16).

In 2015 his photographic project Mare Rostrum, a commission from Marviva Waste Agency of Catalonia, the Port of Barcelona and Drap-Art'15, which focused on the work of the Barcelona Fisherman's Association in retrieving rubbish from the Mediterranean Sea, was presented at the CCCB-Contemporary Culture Centre of Barcelona and later at various spaces throughout Catalonia. An article written on the project in the newspaper El País observed that "the project Mare Rostrum sets out a temporary conceptual bridge across 40 years of experimentations by Thomas Nölle."

Nölle's work in marine archaeology culminated in his intervention in public space entitled SEA≈STORE (December 2016), presented at the Plaça dels Àngels square in front of MACBA – Museum of Contemporary Art of Barcelona, during the festival Drap-Art'16. It consisted of two actions: the Portable Micro-Museums where Nölle gave a small artwork made with residual material found on the beach to every visitor willing to make a commitment to the preservation of the marine ecosystem, leading to the creation of a virtual museum on social media; and the installation Ephemeral Museum, a dome built using bioconstruction with reeds to be used as a laboratory for creative activities, open to the public.

According to Stefano Caldana and Roberta Bosco: "Both installations represent a subtle critique of the system for its ecologically unsustainable practices, setting out the need for sustainable models, both in terms of consumption and of shared human existence."

=== Aspects of photographic practice ===
Thomas Nölle developed his photographic work over the course of his entire career, and its legacy was fundamental for his overall artistic production. Along with his earlier photographic production in black and white, from the 1960s to the 1990s, starting in the early 2000s he included digital colour format. The creation of thematic series was a constant feature of his photographic praxis.

His production from the 1970s to the 1990s was focused on social issues, with the use of photographic sequences, photo-performance and pictorial and collage intervention in photographic printing. Some of the important aspects of his photographic work in the 21st century were the series dedicated to Singular Things, his work on street photography and his research into the potential of light and movement as resources in photographic creation. The pictorial gesture of his visuality was made manifest in his digital photography, creating what Norval Baitello called "non-photography" in the text for his artist book By the Way (2015).

Four projects from the decade 2010–2020 have special significance. Musa x paradisiaca (2010) is a photographic series in colour shown at Lisbon's Arte Periférica Gallery (2014) and in Barcelona (2015). It was dedicated to the life cycle of the banana plant, a metaphor for the fleeting, non-lasting character of the life cycle and the circular time of histories.

In the solo exhibition Way of Light, with photography and video art, shown at Factoría Santiago de Compostela in 2010, he presented the result of his far-reaching research into the potential of light in the construction of images in conjunction with movement. "Writing with light in this poetic series is created on the basis of work in real time with light, movement and speed, with no subsequent manipulation of the image. The series has three moments: chaotic writing, writing as visual music and minimalist writing." Nölle developed this technique gradually, and created abstract photographic compositions with a single shot.

In 2018 he had a solo exhibition at the National Museum of Romanticism (Madrid) with his photographic series By the Way (2008–2018), whose poetic addresses immersive movement in the landscape. For Sergio C. Fanjul, "his distancing from realism gives way to dialogue between the artist's interior and exterior worlds." On this occasion an artist book was published with the same title.

At his solo exhibitions, En Passant, at Puxagallery (Madrid), works included a selection of his production of photographs in light boxes from the series ...in Mind (2017–2020). The series deals with the dynamic interpenetrations that arise when the public enters into contact with the work of art.

Lux 48 art space (Carabanchel, Madrid) organised in 2025 a comprehensive exhibition of his artwork, entitled “My Way”, which explored some of the major thematic strands that guided Nölle’s creative practice, such as nature and environmental issues, social concerns, colonial acculturation, the human–machine relationship, and the intertwining of art, life, memory and history. It was curated by the team: Nekane Aramburu, Norval Baitello Jr., Roberta Bosco & Stefano Caldana, Gustavo Caprín Zara, Martín Carrasco, Nilo Casares, Joan Cruspinera & Annie Pakula, Antoni Esquerra-Torrescasana, Carlos Fadon, Antonio Franco (in memoriam), Carlos Gasparinho, Àngela Montesinos, Maria Pallier, Jürgen Pech, Ulises Pistolo Eliza, Sergio Sabini, Amador Vega.

=== Video art and video installation ===
Another aspect of his production was dedicated to video art and audio-visual installations. In 2006 he had a solo exhibition entitled Between the Images at the V International Image Festival of Manizales (Colombia), where he presented five audio-visual installations. That same year, Nölle participated in the 12th Canariasmediafest – Festival Internacional de Artes y Culturas Digitales de Gran Canaria with the audio-visual installation Hall of Fame (Nölle/cv8.org), which dealt with the perverse and ephemeral star-system market.

The video installation Angel's Leap (Whatever Will Be, Will Be...) which addresses the fallacy of utopianism, was presented in 2008 at the MEIAC (Badajoz), the ZKM Center for Art and Media Karlsruhe (Germany, 2008–09) and the Neue Galerie Graz (Austria, 2009).

An emblematic piece of videoart in his production is Tour en l'air – La vie en rose (2012), an allegory of both the fragility of life and of our memory.

== Cultural activity: L'Angelot (Barcelona) ==
In 1993, Thomas Nölle became the principal patron and co-founder of the Asociación de Cultura Contemporánea L'Angelot in Barcelona, together with Claudia Giannetti, an art historian and his wife and companion since 1980. L'Angelot was the first space in Spain dedicated exclusively to art and new technologies. Nölle ceded the space in Barcelona's Gothic Quarter for the development of the programming of this non-profit association, which was active until 1999. The association carried out more than 70 activities, including exhibitions, seminars, lectures, performances, workshops and publications, acquiring recognized prestige in the Barcelona artistic scene.

== Selected exhibitions ==
His artworks have been shown in numerous international solo and group exhibitions in well-known museums and are represented in several private and public collections:

- 1977: Ritterschen Buchhandlung, Soest (Solo)
- 1977: Produzenten Galerie, Zürich (Solo)
- 1978: Kurhaus Dangast, Dangast (Solo)
- 1979: Werkstatt Galerie Bonn (Solo)
- 1983: Kunsthistorisches Institut, Universität Bonn, Klein unter anderem (Solo)
- 1984: Bonner Kunstverein, Bonn
- 1984: Das ist doch keine Art. Action art with Jürgen Pech during Jean Tinguely's Performance, Bonner Kunstverein, Bonn
- 1984: Kunstmuseum Düsseldorf
- 1984: Kunst ist Gesundheit – Remember Yves Klein. Action art on trams in the Düsseldorf city centre
- 1985: Mülheim Art Museum, Mülheim
- 1987: Kunsthistorisches Institut, Universität Bonn, Bilder 1986/87 (Solo)
- 1988: Orangerie Schloss Augustusburg, Brühl, Room to Move (Solo)
- 1990: Friedrich Naumann Stiftung, Königswinter, Mundus Novus I (Solo)
- 1990: Syndikathalle Raue Gallery, Bonn, Out of Limits
- 1992: Städtische Galerie, Suhl, Mundus Novus II (Solo)
- 1993: L'Angelot Asociación de Cultura Contemporánea, Barcelona
- 1994: Galeria Manoel Macedo, Belo Horizonte, La mer-e (Solo)
- 1996: Purgatori II, Valencia, Fabled Sea (Solo)
- 1996: Centro Cultural Brasil-España, Belo Horizonte, Pontes da Memória (Solo)
- 1998: Transforma Espacio, Vitoria-Gasteiz, Symphonie Technique (Solo)
- 2000: Café Schilling, Barcelona, Musée Méditerranée (Solo)
- 2002: Art Museum of Sabadell, Sin salida de emergencia
- 2002: Centro Nacional de las Artes, Mexico DF, Mexico
- 2002: MUVIM, Museo Valenciano de la Ilustración y la Modernidad, Valencia, Observatori III – International Festival of Artistic Research
- 2003: Arts Centre Gallery, Andorra, Tiempos dispersos (Solo)
- 2004: Museum of Contemporary Art of Ibiza, Pronóstica
- 2005: Art Centre Gallery, Barcelona, Collector's Dream (Solo)
- 2006: Centro Cultural de España, Mexico DF, Silencio vicioso (Solo)
- 2006: V International Image Festival, Manizales, Colombia, Between the Images (Solo)
- 2006: Gran Canaria Espacio Digital, XII Canariasmediafest, Gran Canaria
- 2008: MEIAC – Museum of Ibero-American Contemporary Art, Badajoz, Tiempos dorados – Golden Times (Solo)
- 2009: ZKM Center for Art and Media Karlsruhe, The discreet charm of technology. Art in Spain
- 2009: Neue Galerie Graz, Austria
- 2010: Factoría Santiago, Santiago de Compostela, Way of Light (Solo)
- 2014: Arte Periférica Gallery, Centro Cultural de Belém, Lisbon, Musa x paradisiaca (Solo)
- 2015: Künstlerhaus Wien, Vienna, Über: ich
- 2015: Mare Rostrum Project, CCCB – Barcelona Centre for Contemporary Culture
- 2015: Re:NEW Festival (Drap-Art), Pittsburgh, USA
- 2016: SEA≈STORE, Plaza dels Àngels (Drap-Art'16), Barcelona
- 2017: Goethe-Institut of Lisbon, Elsewhere – An Improbable Journey, with Carlos Gasparinho
- 2018: National Museum of Romanticism, Madrid, By the Way (Solo)
- 2020: Puxagallery, Madrid, En Passant (Solo)
- 2020: Casa de América, Madrid, Notes on South America - A Journey | 1979-1981 (Solo)
- 2025: Lux 48, Madrid, Thomas Nölle - My Way (solo exhibition)

== Monographic catalogues and artist's books ==
- Thomas Nölle – Arbeiten 1985–1991, catalogue, painting and mixed media (Bonn, 1991).
- Thomas Nölle – Fabled Sea, book-object (Bonn, 1995).
- Thomas Nölle – The Poetics of Combinatorics (1997–2003), catalogue, assemblages, mosaics, mixed media and installations (Barcelona, 2004).
- Thomas Nölle – Between the Images, catalogue, audio-visual installations (Barcelona/Manizales, 2006).
- Thomas Nölle – Tiempos dorados | Golden Times, catalogue, photography and installations (Badajoz: MEIAC, 2008). ISBN 978-84-612-7783-4
- Thomas Nölle – Way of Light, catalogue, photography (Santiago de Compostela: Factoría Compostela, 2010).
- Thomas Nölle – Musa, artist book, photography (Barcelona, 2012). ISBN 84-922265-7-9
- Thomas Nölle – By the Way, artist book, photography (Barcelona, 2016). ISBN 978-84-922265-8-0
- Thomas Nölle & Carlos Gasparinho, Elsewhere, artist book, photography (Lisbon, 2016).
- Thomas Nölle – Treatrum Mundi. Nihil Novi (2014-2018), Fascicle, photographic project, Suroeste Revista de Literaturas Ibéricas, nº 8, 2018.
- Thomas Nölle – En passant, catalogue, photography and light boxes (Madrid: Puxagallery, 2020)
- Thomas Nölle – Notes on South America - A Journey | 1979-1981, artist book, photography (Barcelona, 2020). ISBN 978-84-922265-9-7
- Thomas Nölle, “Selbst [Self-portraits] 1964–2020”. Catalogue Raisonné Vol. 1, (Barcelona: 2024)
- Thomas Nölle, “Photography – The Early Works – 1963–1973”, Catalogue Raisonné Vol. 2 (Madrid: 2025)
- Thomas Nölle, “Artworks 1965–1984”, Catalogue Raisonné Vol. 3 (Madrid: 2025)
- Thomas Nölle, “Leda, mir schwant übles [Leda, Unpleasant Times May Lie Ahead] 1979–1981 – Series”, Catalogue Raisonné Vol. 4 (Madrid: 2024)

== Bibliography (selection) ==
- Alzira Carvalho Lima, M.A. Baggio (Ed.), Trans-Plante – Interview with Thomas Nölle (Belo Horizonte: 2009), p. 204-206. ISBN 978-85-60927-09-8
- Amador Vega, Thomas Nölle – Arbeiten 1985–1991, catalogue (Bonn, 1991).
- Ángel Antonio Rodríguez, Interview with Thomas Nölle, En passant (Madrid: Puxagallery, 2020).
- Claudia Giannetti (Ed.), Discreet Charm of Technology – Arts in Spain (Badajoz, Madrid: MEIAC, ZKM, 2008). Thomas Nölle, Angel's Leap (Whatever Will Be, Will Be...), pp. 556–557. ISBN 978-84-612-3278-9 (Online- catalogue): El discreto encanto de la tecnología (Parte 1)
- Claudia Giannetti, Notes on South America - A Journey | 1979-1981 (Barcelona, 2020). ISBN 978-84-922265-9-7V
- Festival Internacional de la Imagen de Manizales (18-21/04/2006), Thomas Nölle – Entre las imágenes, p. 193–201: V Festival Internacional de la Imagen 2006
- L'Angelot Work in Progress 1993–1997 (Barcelona: 1997), ISBN 84-605-6506-8
- Nilo Casares, Thomas Nölle – Golden Times, in Golden Times, (Badajoz: MEIAC, 2008), p. 10–23. ISBN 978-84-612-7783-4
- Norval Baitello Jr., Paths and Their Windows, in Thomas Nölle, By the Way (Barcelona, 2016), p. 23–26. ISBN 978-84-922265-8-0
- Norval Baitello Jr., A carta, o abismo, o beijo. Os ambientes de imagens entre o artístico e o mediático. "A não-fotografia e as imagens hipnógenas. Thomas Nölle e a escrita dos rastros". (São Paulo: Paulus, 2018), p. 113–116. ISBN 978-85-349-4788-6
- Out of Limits, Bonn: Galerie Raue, 1990. Thomas Nölle – Mundus Novus (1989), p. 13–15.
- Siegfried Zielinski, Sensitising to the Other – Für das Andere feinfühlig machen und halten, in Golden Times (Badajoz: MEIAC, 2008), p. 24-31. ISBN 978-84-612-7783-4
- Sol García, Los paisajes errantes de Thomas Nölle en el Museo del Romanticismo, in ARS Magazine Revista de Arte y Coleccionismo, 15/02/2018, Los paisajes errantes de Thomas Nölle en el Museo del Romanticismo
- Roberta Bosco & Stefano Caldana, Thomas Nölle: Una colección de escombros esculpidos por las olas (2016). Una colección de escombros esculpidos por las olas
- Roberta Bosco, Arte para limpiar el mar, El País, 21/12/2015 Arte para limpiar el mar
