= F. Burrall Hoffman =

American architect (1882 - 1980)

F. Burrall Hoffman, Jr.
- Born: March 6, 1882; New Orleans, Louisiana, U.S.
- Died: November 27, 1980 (aged 98); Hobe Sound, Florida, U.S.
- Occupation: Architect
- Buildings: Villa Vizcaya

F. Burrall Hoffman, Jr. (March 6, 1882 – November 27, 1980) was an American architect, best known for his work for James Deering at Villa Vizcaya in Miami, Florida.

== Biography ==
Francis Burrall Hoffman, Jr. was born into a wealthy and well-connected New York family that traced its lineage back to Martin Hermanzen Hoffman, who emigrated from Sweden to New York in 1657. Several generations of the family were active in both state and national politics: Hoffman's great-grandfather Murray Hoffman was a Justice of the Supreme Court of New York, and his grandfather Wickham Hoffman was the United States Minister to Denmark from 1883-93.

Hoffman entered Harvard College with the class of 1903, but received his degree (AB) in 1902 (he spent his senior year as an apprentice at Carrère and Hastings, an architecture firm in New York). From 1903 to 1907, Hoffman attended the École des Beaux-Arts in Paris, graduated with honors and returned to Carrère and Hastings in 1907.

In 1910, Hoffman established his own architecture firm in Manhattan, sharing office space with architect Harry Creighton Ingalls with whom he occasionally collaborated.

In 1912, James Deering engaged Hoffman to be the architect for Villa Vizcaya. Hoffman and his collaborators, interior designer Paul Chalfin and garden designer Diego Suarez, created an Italian style villa that would be the largest and most noteworthy project of his sixty-year career.

Hoffman left the Villa Vizcaya project five years later in 1917 to enlist in the Army. During World War I, He served as a Captain in the Corps of Engineers and later directed camouflage operations with the Second Corps, A.E.F. During World War II, Hoffman served overseas as a Lieutenant Commander in the Navy.

In 1927, Hoffman married Virginia "Dolly" Kimball in Paris. Kimball, from a wealthy Virginia publishing family, quickly established a career as an interior decorator and was often enlisted in the design of her husband's projects. After the stock market crash of 1929, Hoffman closed his New York office, after which he and Dolly spent a majority of their time traveling between New York and Paris. Upon his return to New York, Hoffman rarely engaged in more than one architecture project a year.

Hoffman completed many commissions, mostly designing large houses for wealthy clients. Hoffman's last project was completed in 1974, when he was nearly ninety-eight years old. Hoffman died in 1980 in Hobe Sound, Florida.

== Hoffman & Vizcaya ==
Attained through his Harvard College connections, Hoffman's largest and most notable residential commission was James Deering's Villa Vizcaya in Miami, Florida.

Deering, a wealthy industrialist, and his art director, Paul Chalfin, had spent three years in Europe amassing a large collection of architectural and decorative artifacts. In 1912, Deering hired the then thirty-year-old Hoffman to design a winter home for Deering to showcase his collection. Deering had purchased 130 acres of swampy mangrove on the shore of Biscayne Bay. As early 1913, Hoffman began sketches for the site. Inspired by the Villa Rezzonico in Bassano del Grappa, Italy, Deering and Chalfin decided that the palatial bayfront mansion would be an Italian Style. Typical of his Beaux-Art training, Hoffman designed a roughly square building that functioned on two axes intersecting at the center of the courtyard. The two axes, major and minor correspond to the movement of more important to less important features of the house. The major axis travels east-west from the entrance through the court to the waterside terrace. The minor axis outlines the secondary movement to the gardens. Hoffman ingeniously designed the public rooms in a U-shape to indicate the suggested movement of guests from loggia to entrance, continuing around to the dining room, while providing the living room and dining room direct access to the waterside terrace.

Hoffman worked in collaboration with Paul Chalfin until 1916 - when the project was turned entirely over to Chalfin for furnishing. Deering arrived at Villa Vizcaya on his yacht, Nepenthe on Christmas Day, 1916. Deering spent winters at the home until his death in 1925.

After an Architectural Review in 1917 cited Chalfin and Hoffman as "associate architects" and failed to mention the contribution of landscape architect, Diego Suarez, Hoffman took issue with Chalfin's oversight and never spoke to him again. Hoffman, true to his reputation as the "gentleman architect" never took action to correct this specific article, but he would later take action to correct the record overall, see below.

In 1953, Dade County purchased the home from the Deering heirs. In March of that year, The New York Times published an article that completely ignored Hoffman's contribution to the design of Villa Vizcaya (only attributing the plumbing to him) and credited Paul Chalfin. After thirty-five years of ignoring Chalfin's claims to the architecture of Vizcaya, Hoffman met with an attorney and planned to sue over the gross misrepresentation of the article. The Times published a retraction on May 17, 1953.

== Representative work ==
=== 1908-1919 ===
Hoffman established his architecture practice in 1910 and completed his last project in 1974. While he designed a wide variety of project types, the preponderance were single-family houses for well-to-do clients, mainly in New York and Florida.

Projects, other than Vizcaya, completed after 1907 and by 1919:

- Mausoleum dedicated to Edmund Walstein Davis (1853–1908), the father of a Harvard classmate, at Woodlawn Cemetery in The Bronx, New York (completed in 1908, before Hoffman established his practice).
- Municipal Building, Village of Southampton, New York (selected as architect in July 1910 after a competition; completed May 1911; note: Hoffman associated with architects Hiss and Weekes during construction; Donnelly & Corrigan, contractor).
- Little Theater, 240 West 44th Street, New York City (completed 1911, Harry Creighton Ingalls and F. Burrall Hoffman, Jr., associated architects).
- St. Ann's Church, Lenox, Massachusetts (completed 1912).
- Ballyshear: house and formal gardens for Charles B. Macdonald, Southampton, New York (completed 1913; Annette Hoyt Flanders, landscape architect; Rose Standish Nichols, garden designer; Donnelly & Corrigan, contractor).
- The Neighborhood Theater, 466 Grand Street, New York City (completed 1915, Harry Creighton Ingalls and F. Burrall Hoffman, Jr., associated architects).
- Church of the Queen of the Most Holy Rosary, Bridgehampton, New York (dedicated July 11, 1915; Donnelly & Corrigan, contractor).
- St. Brigid Catholic Church, Westbury, New York (dedicated spring 1916; Charles Jay Connick and Henry Wynd Young, stained glass).
- Villa Artemis: house for Amy Phipps Guest (Mrs. Frederick Guest), West Palm Beach, Florida (completed 1916).
- Heamaw: house for Henry Carnegie Phipps, West Palm Beach, Florida (completed 1916; demolished 1972).
- Elizabethan playhouse for Mrs. Lorenzo E. Woodhouse, East Hampton, New York (completed 1917; converted to a private residence).
- Townhouse for Charlotte Winthrop Fowler, 17 East 90th Street, New York City (permit application 1917; contracts awarded June 1917; completed 1919; sold to Harriet S. Clark in August 1919).

Hoffman is sometimes included in the credits for the Henry Miller Theater, 124 West 43rd Street, New York City (completed 1918; demolished 2004-2009 except for the facade; Paul R. Allen and Harry Creighton Ingalls, associated architects) but according to Charles Over Cornelius, writing in 1918 in The Architectural Record, "at the inception of the project Mr. Allen associated himself with Mr. Ingalls and Mr. Hoffman, architects of the Little Theatre and Neighborhood Playhouse, for the designing and execution of this particular building. At Mr. Hoffman's entrance into the government service at the very beginning of the work, the onus fell entirely upon Mr. Allen and Mr. Ingalls, and their competent cooperation has given to New York a theatre whose peer is scarce to be found.")

=== 1920-1929 ===
Hoffman volunteered for military service in May 1917, soon after America's entry into World War One. He sailed for Europe in October 1917, leaving his practice in care of Harry Ingalls, and returned to America in early November 1919, eventually resuming his architecture practice.

Projects completed after 1919 and by 1929:

- Addition to Al Poniente, for Joseph Riter (its principal feature a music room with a cypress ceiling decorated by Robert Winthrop Chanler), Palm Beach, Florida (completed by 1920; demolished about 1928).
- Dibble Memorial Library (Savannah River Site Museum), Aiken, South Carolina (contract awarded May 1926; F. Burrall Hoffman, Jr. and Murray Hoffman, architects).
- Apartment building at 136 East 79th Street, New York City (with Lafayette A. Goldstone, architect; completed 1928).
- Apartment building at 4 East 72nd Street, New York City (with Lafayette A. Goldstone, architect; completed 1929).
- Apartment building at 730 Park Avenue, New York City (with Lafayette A. Goldstone, architect; completed 1929).
- Ranch house for Mr. & Mrs. Henry Potter Russell, Carmel Valley, California (completed 1929).

=== 1930-1945 ===
After the stock market crash in 1929, Hoffman permanently closed his New York office.

Projects completed after 1929 and by 1945:

- St. Brigid Church, Peapack, New Jersey (completed about 1936 with funding from Helen Cutting in memory of her husband Suydam Cutting).

=== 1946-1974 ===
Projects completed after 1945 and by 1974:

- Residence for Clarence Dillon, Montego Bay, Jamaica (completed 1954).
