= Captive Hearts =

Captive Hearts or Captive Heart may refer to:

- The Captive Heart, a 1946 war film starring Michael Redgrave
- Captive Hearts (manga), by Matsuri Hino
- Captive Hearts (film), a 1987 romantic film
- "Captive Hearts" (Falcon Crest), a 1986 television episode
- "Captive Hearts" (X-Men: The Animated Series), a 1993 television episode
- "Captive Heart" (song), a 1996 song by Selena
