= Captive Heart (song) =

1995 song performed by Selena

Promotional single by Selena

from the album Dreaming of You
- Released: January 12, 1996
- Recorded: January 1995
- Studio: Bananaboat Studios, Burbank; Q-Productions, Corpus Christi; Conway Recording Studios, North Hollywood
- Genre: Electropop
- Length: 4:23
- Label: EMI Records
- Songwriters: Mark Goldenberg, Kit Hain
- Producer: Guy Roche

"Captive Heart" is a song by American Tejano pop singer Selena. It was the second promotional single released from Dreaming of You (1995), behind "God's Child (Baila Conmigo)". It was written by Mark Goldenberg and Kit Hain, and was produced by Guy Roche. Recording sessions took place at Selena's father, Abraham Quintanilla Jr.'s recording studio Q-Productions and at several other locations. The song was given mixed reviews by music critics. "Captive Heart" is an electropop song performed in a rhythmical pop groove.

== Production and composition ==
"Captive Heart" was recorded at Bananaboat Studios in Burbank, California in January 1995, Q-Productions in Corpus Christi, Texas and at Conway Studios in North Hollywood. It was written by Mark Goldenberg and Kit Hain, and was produced by Guy Roche. It was mixed by Nathaniel "Mick" Guzuaski, engineered by Mario Lucy, Brian "Red" Moore and Mona Suchard who also was credited at the assistant engineer. American singer Donna De Lory was the backing vocalist for "Captive Heart". Recording sessions had taken nearly less than a week to complete the song.

"Captive Heart" is an electropop song performed in a rhythmical R&B pop groove. It draws influences from synthpop, fast rock, dance-pop and electronic dance music. According to the sheet music published at Musicnotes.com by EMI Music Publishing, the song is composed in the key of D major with a time signature in common time, and with a moderate groove of 91 beats per minute.

== Critical reception ==
Vibe editor Ed Morales compared both Evelyn "Champagne" King and "Wherever You Are" (duet with the Barrio Boyzz) with the song "Captive Heart". While, according to the Chicago Tribune, "Captive Heart" was destined for urban-contemporary radio. Leonard Charles of Miami Today, commented on "Captive Heart"'s lack of impact on the Hot 100, stating that the song would have been stronger if EMI Records had promoted the single extensively. Charles also commented that he believes that the record company didn't put in much effort on the song but believed that EMI had only put in effort on singles "Dreaming of You" and "I Could Fall in Love". Benson Ramos of The Gaston Gazette believed "Captive Heart" wasn't "crossover potential". Steven Washington of Aurora Sentinel praised the song's "electronic feels" and "Latin flavors" that it brings to the song. Sabrina Moore of Corsicana Daily Sun, disliked the song because it felt "unoriginal" but commented that Selena could have done better in another Latin flavored ballad.

The Daily Vault believed Selena made a mistake with "Captive Heart", stating that "the song was a surprising and painful flaw, because it showcases a mistake of exerting too much throat, which many popular singers currently do". The Daily Vault instated that it was a one-way ticket to voice destruction. Mario Tarradell of The Dallas Morning News stated while reviewing "I'm Getting Used To You" that the songs "are a bit more uptempo, bordering on that New Jill Swing sound popularized by Mary J. Blige and Jade".

== Track listing ==
- U.S. Promo Single (1995)
1. "Captive Heart" – 4:23–4:18
- U.S. Cassette Single (1995)
1. "Captive Heart" – 4:23

== Credits and personnel ==
All credits were taken from the album's liner notes.

- Selena – vocals, backing vocals
- Donna De Lory – back-up singer
- Mark Goldenberg – writer
- Kit Hain – writer
- Juan Figueroa, Arnold Hain – synthesizers
- José Behar – co-producer
- Guy Roche – producer
- Nathaniel "Mick" Guzuaski – audio mixer
- Mario Lucy – engineer
- Brain "Red" Moore – engineer
- Mona Suchard – engineer and assistant engineer

== See also ==
- List of Selena songs
- Selena singles discography
