= James Deering =

American industrialist

- James Deering, 1917, by John Singer Sargent
- Born: November 12, 1859; South Paris, Maine
- Died: September 21, 1925 (aged 65) aboard SS Paris
- Occupations: Industrialist, art collector
- Known for: building Villa Vizcaya

James Deering (November 12, 1859 – September 21, 1925) was an American executive in the management of his family's Deering Harvester Company and later International Harvester, as well as a socialite and an antiquities collector. He built his landmark Vizcaya estate, where he was an early 20th-century resident on Biscayne Bay in the present day Coconut Grove district of Miami, Florida. Begun in 1910, with architecture and gardens in a Mediterranean Revival style, Vizcaya was his passionate endeavor with artist Paul Chalfin, and his winter home from 1916 to his death in 1925.

== Early life ==
James Deering was born in 1859 in the western Maine town of South Paris. He was the son of William Deering and his second wife, Clara Barbour Cummings Hamilton Deering. His older half-brother was the arts patron Charles Deering.

His father, who had inherited the family woolen mill and owned large tracts of land in the Northeast, invested in a farm-equipment manufacturing company that he renamed the Deering Harvester Company. In 1873, he moved the family to Chicago, Illinois. The Deering Harvester Company's reaper machinery enabled farmers in the US Midwest to harvest an acre of grain per hour, an increase in productivity sufficient to enhance the profitability of Midwest agriculture significantly. The Deering Harvester Company grew in value, so that by the end of the 19th century the Deerings had become one of America's wealthiest families, and William Deering, James's father, was frugal in managing the family's spending, but did acquire a residence in newly fashionable St. Augustine, Florida, for the winter season. James Deering's older brother Charles joined the family business in the 1880s, after attending the United States Naval Academy and serving nine years in the Navy. James Deering attended Northwestern University for a year and the Massachusetts Institute of Technology for another year before joining the company at the same time as Charles.

== Career ==
James joined the Deering Harvester Company in 1880 as treasurer. In 1902, J.P. Morgan and Company purchased Deering Harvester and McCormick Reaper Company and merged them to form the International Harvester Corporation, the largest producer of agricultural machinery in the U.S. Deering became vice-president of the new corporation, responsible for the three Illinois manufacturing plants. In 1909, he was phased out of daily company affairs by J.P. Morgan interests.

By the turn of the century, Deering owned homes on Lake Shore Drive in Chicago, in the countryside near Evanston, Illinois, in New York City, and in Paris. His name appeared in social columns as an arts connoisseur, socialite, international traveler, and cultural ambassador. He hosted events for French dignitaries at his New York and Chicago residences. In 1906, for Deering's work in promoting agricultural technology development in France, he was awarded the Légion d'honneur ("National Order of the Legion of Honour").

== Vizcaya ==
In 1910, he purchased land for a complex of buildings and gardens in Coconut Grove, south of Miami and north of his brother's estate. He and Paul Chalfin then travelled through Europe purchasing furnishings and architectural elements to be incorporated into Deering's new home, which he named "Vizcaya", the name of a Spanish province rendered in English as "Biscay".

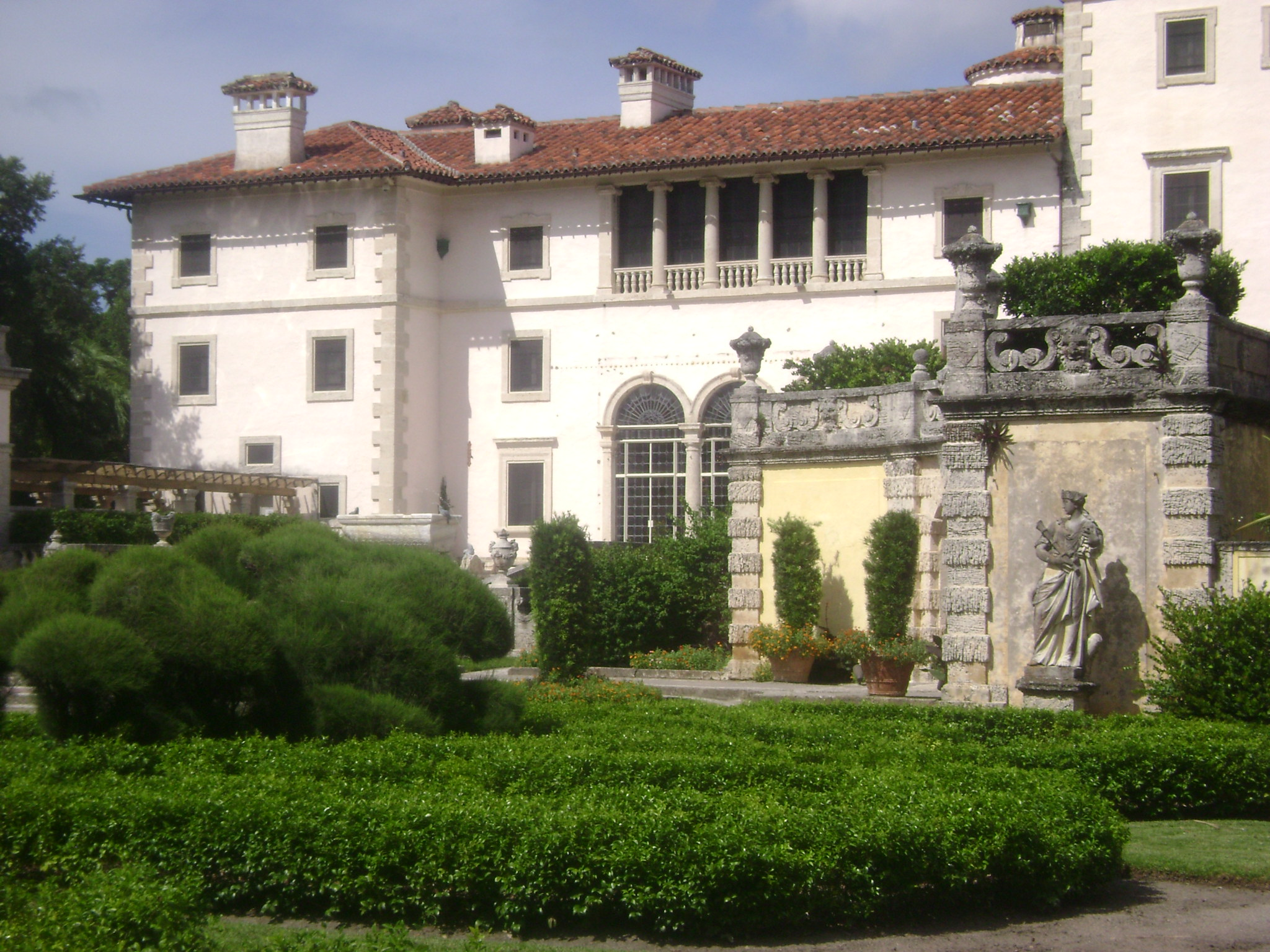
Villa Vizcaya

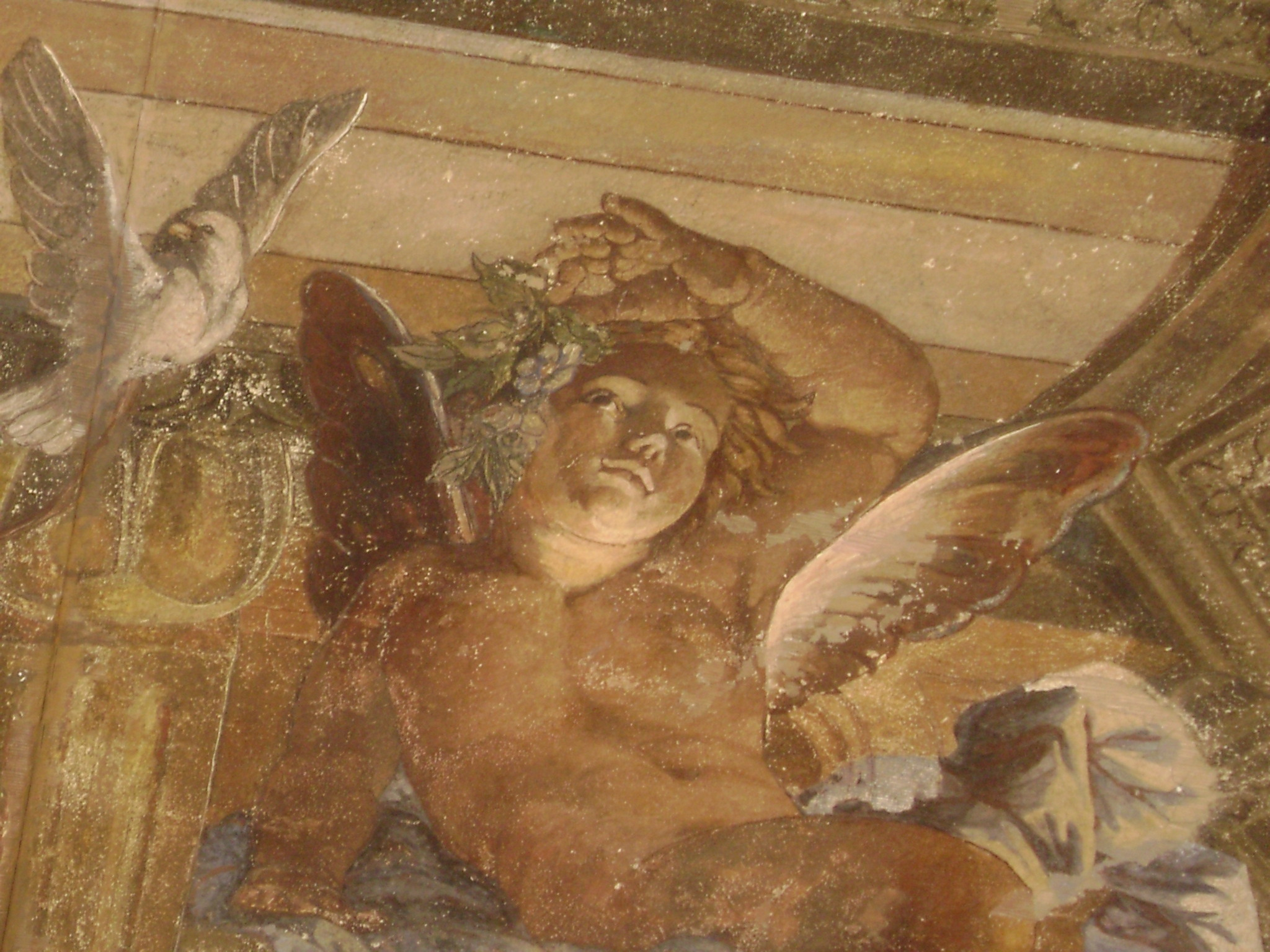
Garden fresco

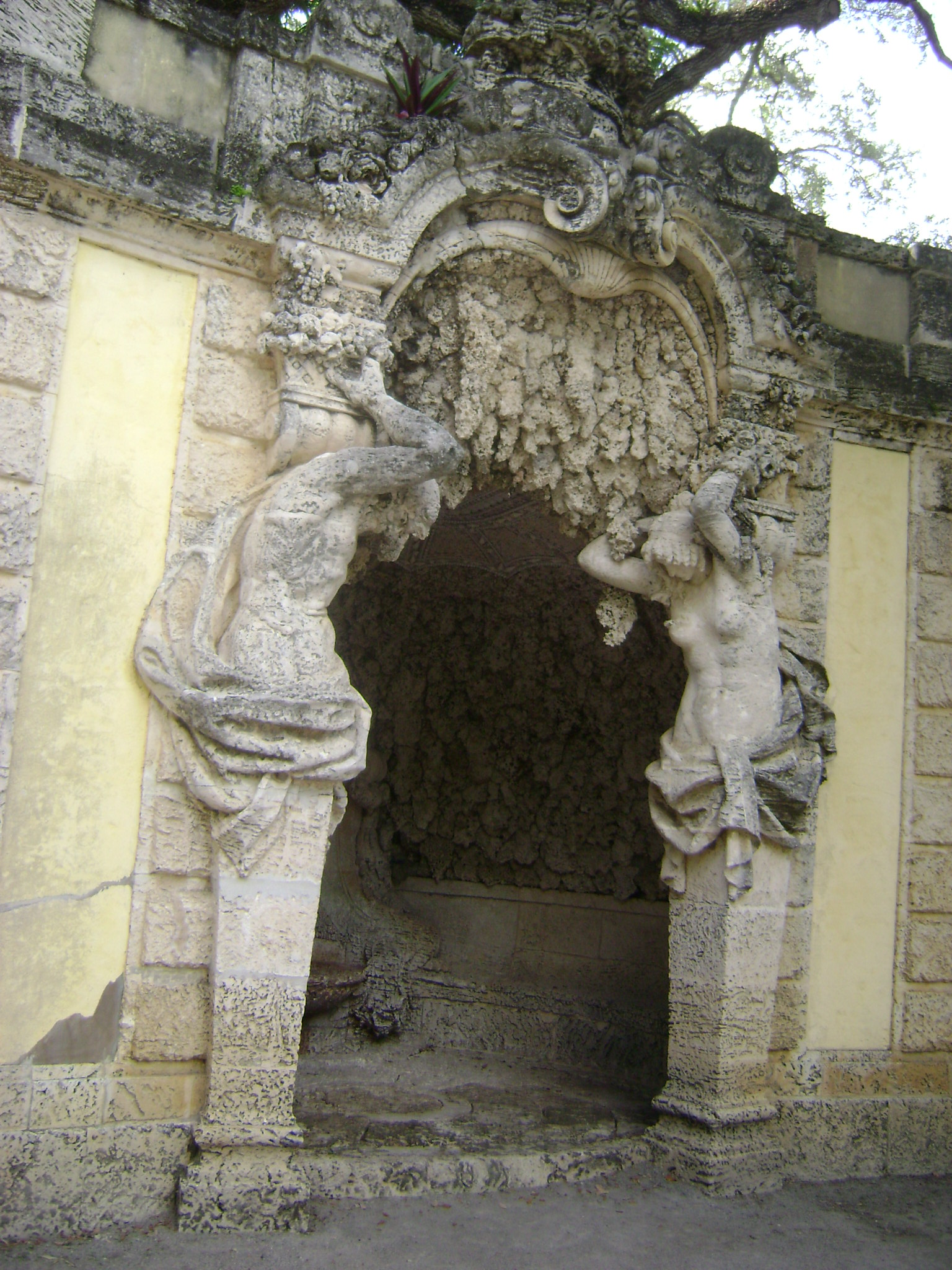
Grotto seating

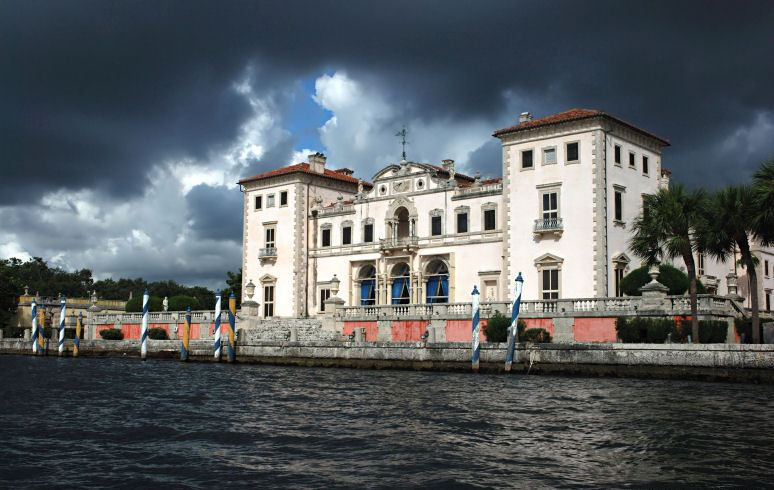
Storm clouds

James Deering built Villa Vizcaya between 1914 and 1922 with visionary mastermind of the project, designer Paul Chalfin, his collaborator companion. The architect was F. Burrall Hoffman Jr. The estate's landscape master plan and formal gardens were designed by Colombian landscape designer Diego Suarez. Paul Chalfin had attended Harvard, trained as a painter at the École des Beaux-Arts in Paris, and was an associate of renowned decorator Elsie de Wolfe. She introduced Chalfin to Deering for the interiors of his Chicago home in 1910. Chalfin and Deering traveled through Europe together later in 1910 for the first trip of many over the years, in part to collect ideas and begin acquiring art, antiquities, and furnishings for the new Florida estate. Villa Vizcaya is the culmination of their shared effort and a lasting memorial to their creative relationship.

The Villa Vizcaya is distinguished for its Italian Renaissance-inspired Mediterranean Revival architecture, Italian Renaissance revival gardens, and intricately designed, detailed, and executed interior architectural elements with European, Asian, and American furnishings, along with art and antiquities that span two millennia. The numerous sculptures in the gardens and villa are of ancient Greek, Greco-Roman, and Italian Renaissance origins and styles.

For example, one element is altar-like in white marble, featuring the carved heads of goats, cattle, and lions, and flanked by coral stone pillars with carving of the 'Oak Tree of Gernika', symbolizing the freedom of the Basque Vizcaya in Spain.

The gardens are notable for introducing classical Italian and French design aesthetics into a subtropical habitat's plant palette and context — a new approach. This resulted in ongoing garden experiments with many tropical plants new to American horticulture. While Vizcaya's landscape design style evokes other periods and places, the use of native stone, plants, and light modulation reflected Deering's desire to showcase the indigenous natural beauty. By 1922, the 180-acre (0.73 km^{2}) estate included large lagoons and new islands down-coast south of the villa and its formal gardens.

On the estate's western acreage, across present day South Miami Avenue, were the produce gardens and grazing fields. A village compound was designed and built to the west, also. These endeavors were done with the intent of making Vizcaya primarily self-sufficient, modeled on European estates to compensate for the limited commodities and services of early 1920s Miami. The village buildings housed the property's staff quarters, auto garages, equipment sheds, workshops, and barns for the domesticated animals.

Deering spent winters there beginning on Christmas Day 1916 when the residence was sufficiently complete and he arrived aboard his new yacht Nepenthe. He immediately engaged in the Miami regatta season having entered earlier from Paris by letter his 44-foot (13.4 m) powerboat Psyche in all events for which the boat qualified in the January 1917 regatta. Among James Deering's closest friends were painter Gari Melchers and his wife Corinne. Through his brother Charles, also a patron of the arts and collector, he had friendships with the painters John Singer Sargent and Anders Zorn. Sargent visited Vizcaya in March 1917 and produced a series of watercolors of the estate, as well as portrait of James. After the extensive gardens were completed in 1923, Deering's health began to weaken. Nonetheless, he traveled and entertained guests, including the silent film stars Lillian Gish and Marion Davies. Deering was described in his later years as "a reticent man with impeccably proper manners, leavened by a sense of humor." He was not unlike a "Jay Gatsby" figure of the "Roaring Twenties" era. In 1923, he opened the gardens to the public on Sundays, and Deering reportedly watched the visitors from his balcony, curious about who came, but not wanting to be recognized for his hospitality. In this period's personal letters, he expressed the hope that his nieces and nephews would enjoy coming to Vizcaya, so tennis courts, a bowling alley, a billiard room, and a swimming pool were part of the estate to encourage their visits.

== Personal life ==
Deering never married and attempts to document his personal life and sexuality are inconclusive, though a substantial case has been put forth that he was homosexual, as Chalfin undoubtedly was.

In 1908, Deering retired from the vice-presidency of International Harvester, as his health weakened, due to pernicious anemia.

== Death and legacy ==
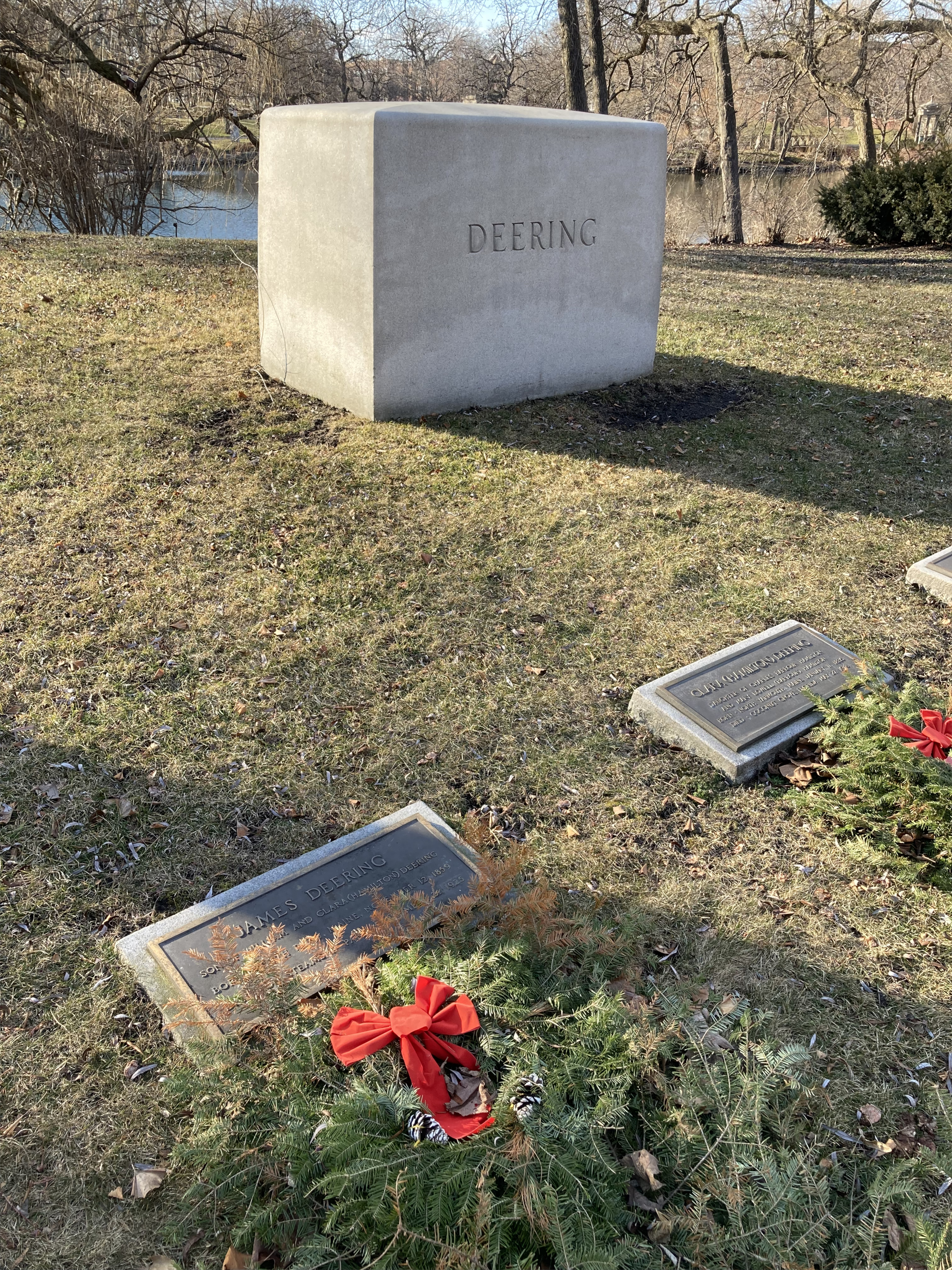
Deering's grave at Graceland Cemetery

James Deering died on September 21, 1925, on board the steamship SS Paris en route back to the United States. He was buried at Graceland Cemetery in Chicago.

The philanthropic beneficiaries of his estate were Wesley Hospital, founded by his father in Chicago; the Visiting Nurse Association; the Children's Hospital of Chicago; and the Art Institute of Chicago, which received several significant paintings: the Édouard Manet "Mocking of Christ" and four by Italian master Giambattista Tiepolo of Rinaldo and Armida based on scenes from the 16th-century epic Gerusalemme Liberata by Torquato Tasso.

Following the death of James Deering, Villa Vizcaya passed to his two nieces, Marion Deering McCormick and Barbara Deering Danielson. Over the decades, after hurricanes and rising maintenance costs, they began selling the estate's surrounding land parcels. In 1952, at a below-market price, they sold the villa and formal gardens, and in 1955 the village 'core estate' to Miami-Dade County for a museum and gardens to be open to the public. With the initial sale, they donated the antiquities and furnishings to the County Museum.

=== Museum and gardens ===
Unlike many other historic house museums, Vizcaya contains the original antiques and furnishings, giving continuity to experience Deering's era. His brother Charles Deering's nearby estate, now named 'The Deering Estate at Cutler', is also open to the public and owned by Miami-Dade County, but without art and furnishings. James Deering's estate, now named Vizcaya Museum and Gardens, is an accredited museum and National Historic Landmark. The villa, gardens, and village are under ongoing restoration. The Vizcaya Museum and Gardens mission is "to preserve Vizcaya to engage our community and its visitors in learning through the arts, history, and the environment."
