= 730 Park Avenue =

Apartment building in Manhattan, New York

- Interactive map of the 730 Park Avenue area

General information
- Type: Residential
- Architectural style: Neo-Renaissance, Neo-Jacobean
- Location: 730 Park Avenue, Lenox Hill, Upper East Side, Manhattan, New York City, U.S.
- Coordinates: 40.77045°N 73.96472°W
- Construction started: 1928
- Completed: 1929

Height
- Architectural: 225 feet (69 m)
- Roof: 213 feet (65 m)

Technical details
- Floor count: 19

Design and construction
- Architects: Lafayette A. Goldstone and F. Burrall Hoffman

730 Park Avenue is a historic residential building in Lenox Hill on the Upper East Side of Manhattan in New York City. A cooperative, the building has 38 apartments.

== History ==
The nineteen-story building was completed in 1929. It is 225 feet (69 m) high. It was designed by architect Lafayette A. Goldstone, with F. Burrall Hoffman, Jr.

Past tenants included Samuel Irving Newhouse, Sr. (the founder of Advance Publications) and his wife Mitzi, philanthropist Edward Warburg, John Langeloth Loeb, Jr. (who served as the United States Ambassador to Denmark from 1981 to 1983), Lyman G. Bloomingdale (the co-founder of Bloomingdale's) and journalist Mike Wallace of 60 Minutes. It was the final home of novelist Edna Ferber.
