= USS Nepenthe =

Patrol vessel of the United States Navy

History

United States
- Name: USS Nepenthe
- Namesake: Previous name retained
- Builder: Mathis Yacht Building Company, Camden, New Jersey
- Yard number: 67
- Completed: December 1916
- Acquired: 7 June 1917
- Identification: Official number 214676
- Fate: Returned to owner, 5 October 1917
- Notes: Operated as private houseboat Nepenthe before and after naval service

General characteristics
- Type: House boat
- Tonnage: 20 tons
- Length: 80 ft (24 m)
- Beam: 17 ft (5.2 m)
- Draft: 2 ft 10 in (0.86 m)
- Speed: 14 knots (26 km/h; 16 mph)

USS Nepenthe (SP-112) was a luxury yacht belonging to James Deering and used at his estate, Vizcaya in Miami, Florida. The yacht was completed December 1916 and delivered to Deering who immediately took the yacht to Florida. Nepenthe was acquired by the United States Navy, designated a house boat though given the S.P. indicator of a section patrol vessel, and used briefly from 7 June to 5 October 1917. The yacht resumed its place at the estate until it sank in 1926 during a major hurricane one year after Deering's death. After salvage the yacht was sold.

== Deering Yacht at Vizcaya ==
Nepenthe was built as a civilian yacht, of a type designated "houseboat" (Note: The outward appearance of these "housboats" was closer to the look of a power yacht than to the boxy designs associated with the modern "houseboat.") at the time to describe the relative focus on livability in comparison with the usual powerboats, in 1917 by the Mathis Yacht Building Company at Camden, New Jersey, with completion in December 1916. The yacht was built for industrialist James Deering of Chicago, New York and Miami, Florida and was docked adjacent to his Miami estate Vizcaya.

Deering owned homes in Chicago, New York and Paris and traveled extensively but he often spent winters in Florida. Construction of Vizcaya began in 1912, and Deering officially began his occupancy on Christmas Day 1916, when he arrived aboard Nepenthe. The yacht was kept constantly ready for use and equipped with the same china, monogrammed French linens, and fine accessories as the mansion. From Christmas 1916 until his death in 1925 Deering typically resided at Vizcaya from the end of November to the middle of April, entertaining guests that included Lillian Gish, President Warren Harding, Marion Davies, William Jennings Bryan, Thomas Edison and John Singer Sargent. In April 1917, Sargent was invited to cruise the Florida Keys aboard Nepenthe with James and Charles Deering. He joined the cruise "reluctantly", doing some watercolor sketches (including Derelicts, 1917), as he wanted to stay at the mansion for its "mine of sketching."

== World War I service ==
The U.S. Navy acquired Nepenthe from her owner on 7 June 1917 for use during World War I. She was commissioned as USS Nepenthe (SP-112). Assigned to the 7th Naval District, Nepenthe served in Florida waters. (Note: Sandler and Wouters (referenced below with regard to Maritime Vizcaya) note that it is "possible the ship was used to house officers off of Key West" but that they cannot confirm that.) However, she proved unsuitable for Navy service, and was returned to her owner on 5 October 1917.

== Return to Vizcaya ==
Deering was happiest aboard a boat, preferring seven- to ten-day cruises aboard Nepenthe. (Note: There were several boats kept at Vizcaya: in addition to Nepenthe, there was a fishing boat Psyche, a racing yacht Sayonara, and several smaller utility boats.) The yacht was sunk, a year after Deering's death aboard the SS City of Paris (1920), in the 1926 Miami hurricane. Nepenthe was salvaged and sold.
