= Paul Chalfin =

Artist and interior designer (1874-1959)

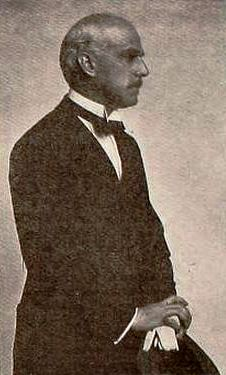
- Chalfin in 1920
- Born: November 2, 1874; New York City
- Died: February 16, 1959 (aged 84); Clifton, New Jersey
- Known for: Villa Vizcaya
- Parent(s): Jane Voorhees (Connolly) Chalfin; Samuel Fletcher Chalfin

Paul Chalfin (1874-1959) was an artist and interior designer with an interest in architecture, best known for his work at Villa Vizcaya. Chalfin was openly gay; his longtime partner was Louis Koons.

== Early life ==
Paul Chalfin was born in New York City on November 2, 1874, to Colonel Samuel Fletcher Chalfin and Jane Voorhees (Connolly) Chalfin. Chalfin entered Harvard College in 1894 but left after two years to become an artist, enrolling at the Art Students League of New York to study painting. After graduating in 1898, he was accepted at the École des Beaux-Arts in Paris, where he studied painting with Jean-Léon Gérôme, a historic genre painter who had previously taught Thomas Eakins. Chalfin possessed excellent taste in building design and used his extensive observation of European buildings and monuments, and liked being mistaken for an architect, but he never studied or obtained a degree in architecture, nor did he ever work as an architect.

== Career ==
In 1899, while studying in Paris, Chalfin traveled to Italy. In 1902, he received honorable mention for the Lazarus Scholarship for his mural painting on the subject of spring. Chalfin returned to Massachusetts in 1903 to succeed Walter T. Cabot as Curator of Chinese and Japanese art at the Museum of Fine Arts in Boston. While curator, he published a 27-paged catalogue entitled 'Japanese wood carvings, architectural and decorative fragments from temples and palaces’.

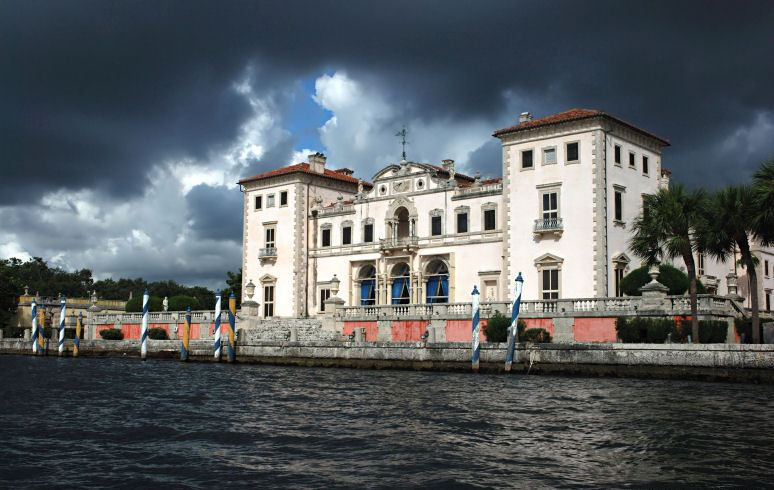
Vizcaya as seen from Biscayne Bay

In 1905, the Lazarus Scholarship committee granted him a three-year scholarship to study mural painting in Italy, and, in 1906, Chalfin moved to Rome where he lived at the American Academy. Over the next three years, Chalfin split his time between Rome, Florence, Venice and Paris, studying and copying the works of Piranesi, Fra Angelico and Tiepolo, as well as copying a lunette by Jacopo Pontormo at a villa in Florence, most likely Vertumnus and Pomona. His final month abroad was in Paris, completing his scholarship by painting a large decorative panel entitled The Poet in 1908. In 1909, in honor of his work, the American Academy in Rome named Chalfin a fellow.

=== Vizcaya ===
In 1910, Chalfin began his most notable and successful project collaborating with F. Burrall Hoffman on the landmark Villa Vizcaya for the industrial magnate James Deering. Deering was an heir of the International Harvester fortune and had acquired substantial land on Biscayne Bay in present-day Miami, Florida. Chalfin was responsible for the choice of the general overall design of the main house and garden, and for decorating and furnishing the interior of the main house himself, while F. Burrall Hoffman was responsible for implementing Chalfin's stylistic choices by integrating them into and adapting them to his own designs of the house itself. Chalfin would later claim mean-spiritedly and falsely in an article in The New York Times, that he designed everything at Vizcaya, saying that "Hoffman did the plumbing, I did the house." Under threat of a lawsuit by Hoffman, The Times later published a retraction of that article, acknowledging that Hoffman was the architect who designed the house so as to realize Chalfin's overall stylistic choices and adding that it was actually Diego Suarez who designed the Gardens along Chalfin's ideas for it. In fact Chalfin, who had been chosen by Deering as a consultant on external style and interior decoration, was the one who had hired Hoffman in the first place, precisely because Chalfin knew that he himself was not an architect, and one would be required for this new building project.

The villa was completed for residency in 1916, and the formal gardens and acres of landscaped grounds completed in 1923.

=== Untermyer Tomb ===
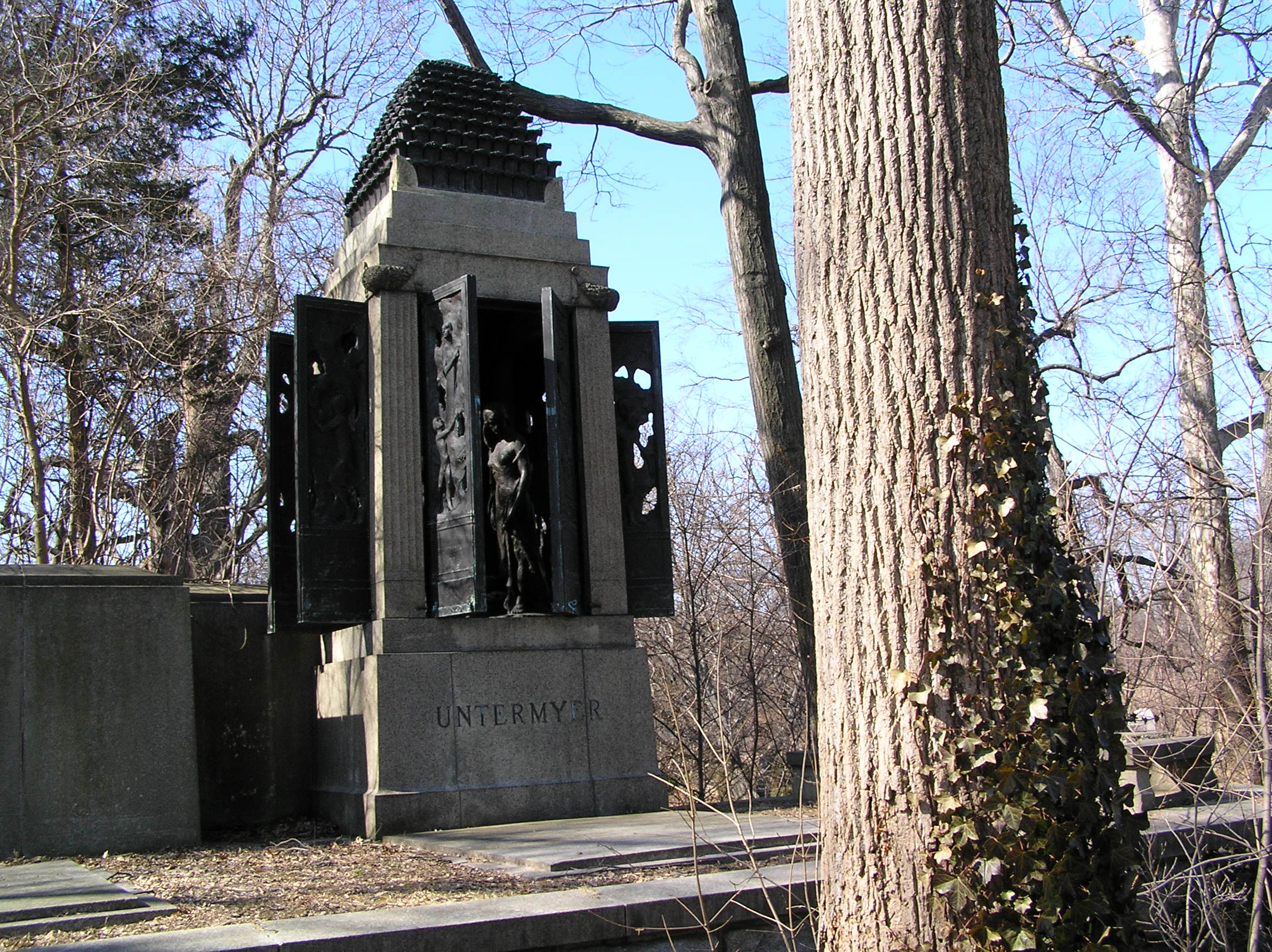
Gravesite of Samuel Untermyer, Woodlawn Cemetery

In the 1920s, Chalfin designed the historic Samuel Untermyer family memorial and mausoleum located at Woodlawn Cemetery in the Bronx, New York. The expansive funerary monument, which marks one of the largest burial lots in the cemetery, is noted for its pre-World War I opulence and its early transition into Art Deco design. Built as a collaborative effort, the structure features prominent bronze sculptural elements and classical figures executed by celebrated American artist Gertrude Vanderbilt Whitney, founder of the Whitney Museum of American Art Chalfin’s complex design incorporates sculpted metal doors, lion statues, a whispering wall, and a central fountain set into a slate Star of David.

Over the decades, the monument largely fell out of public attention and fell into disrepair. A multi-year restoration project was subsequently initiated through a joint preservation partnership between the Woodlawn Cemetery and Conservancy, the Untermyer Gardens Conservancy, and descendants of the Untermyer family. The completed restoration, which brought renewed scholarly attention to Chalfin’s funerary architecture alongside Whitney's bronze tableaus, was officially unveiled during a commemorative dedication ceremony on October 3, 2026.

== Later life ==
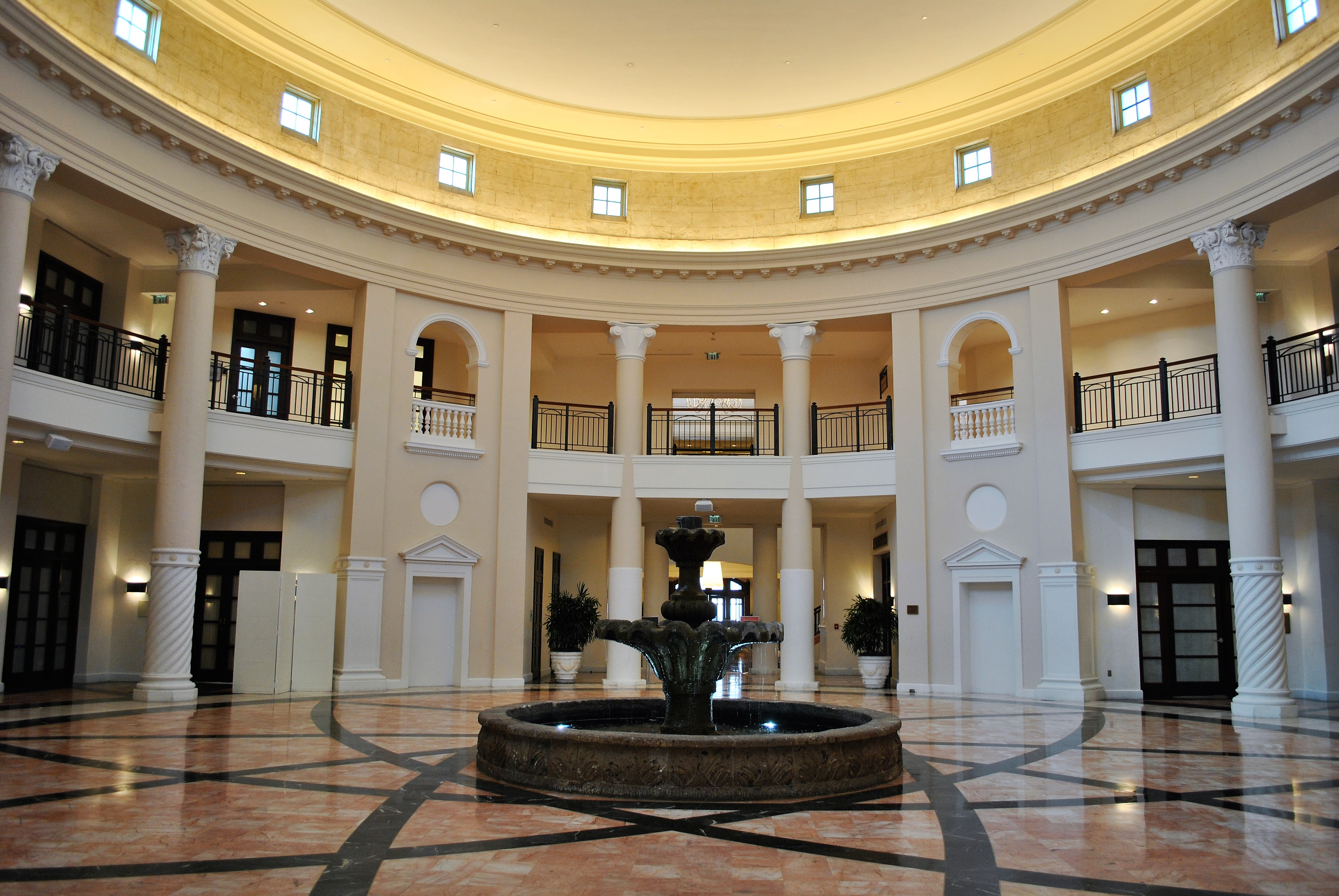
Colonnade Building, 1926, Coral Gables, FL. With Walter De Garmo and Phineas Paist

Despite high praise for his work on Villa Vizcaya, Chalfin never worked on another mansion. Soon after the death of James Deering, he collaborated with Phineas Paist and Walter De Garmo on the Colonnade Building (1926). Little is documented of Chalfin's later career; he produced several drawings for unrealized houses on Miami Beach and decorated the apartment of actress Lillian Gish, friend of James Deering. Chalfin returned to Vizcaya in 1934 to consult on rehabilitation of the property after a major hurricane. In 1940, Chalfin retired due to failing eyesight. Paul Chalfin died on February 15, 1959, at the age of 84 in a nursing home in Upper Montclair, New Jersey. In 1956, Chalfin was made an honorary member of the American Institute of Decorators and was cited by the American Institute of Architects for his work on the interior of Villa Vizcaya
