= Diego Suarez (garden designer) =

Colombian-Italian landscape architect and garden designer in the United States

- Born: 1888; Bogotá, Colombia
- Died: September 14, 1974 (aged 85–86); New York City, New York
- Occupation: Garden designer
- Spouse: Evelyn Isabella Marshall

Diego Suarez (1888 in Bogotá, Colombia – 14 September 1974 in New York City, New York) was a garden designer best known for his work at James Deering's Villa Vizcaya in Miami, Florida. He also served as a press attaché and minister-counselor for Chile in Washington, D.C. from 1948 until 1952 and counselor to the Colombian delegation to the United Nations.

== Family background ==
A son of Roberto Suarez, a Colombian diplomat and historian, and his Italian wife, the former Maria Costa (1870–1949), Suarez and his sisters, Camelia and Lucia, and brother, Roberto, spent their childhood in their mother's native country after the death of their father. Suarez took courses as an architectural designer at the Accademia delle Belle Arti in Florence. There the young man was taken up by Arthur Acton of the well-known English expatriate family, who was engaged in restoring the gardens of Villa La Pietra, Acton's villa outside Florence, where the formal terraced plan had been swept away in the early nineteenth century by the fashion for English landscape gardens in the naturalistic manner. Acton passed to Suarez, who went four or five days a week to the villa, some of the formal Renaissance garden ideals that were being revived in the late nineteenth century by designers such as Achille Duchêne.

Through Acton, whose wife was an American heiress, Suarez was introduced into the Anglo-American community of Florence, where he began to lay out gardens, notably, he remembered years later, one at Villa Schifanoia for Lewis Einstein and another for Charles Loeser, one of the first collectors of Paul Cézanne.

== Career as garden designer ==
=== Villa Vizcaya ===
In May 1914, when James Deering, the International Harvester heir, and his travelling companion and long-term artistic advisor Paul Chalfin, a decorative painter and interior decorator who once worked for Elsie de Wolfe, were lent one of the smaller casinas at La Pietra, Acton commissioned Suarez to take them around and show them some villas they would not otherwise have had access to. Among the Anglo-Americans in Florence was Lady Sybil Cutting, who had the Villa Medici in Fiesole, and who suggested that Suarez accompany her to America.

The outbreak of war marooned Suarez in New York, where he met a likable young Italian with whom he roomed cheaply in Brooklyn but kept up his connections. Thus it was lunching at the Ritz with Mrs. Albert Gallatin that he ran into Deering and Chalfin, and through the old connection he was invited to design the garden for Villa Vizcaya.

Aside from the straight landward approach avenue, less commonly used then than now, the gardens at Villa Vizcaya are centered on two of the façades. One is the boat basin facing Biscayne Bay; its central island is in the form of a boat, railed by balustrades that are punctuated by obelisks, with central landing stairs shoreside and bayside, and bosquets of trees at bow and stern.

The main extent of the gardens faces south, with a central axis that rises to a casino, and radiating side axes that offer glimpses of the lake beyond their ends. The main garden element, which had been purchased on one of Deering and Chalfin's trips before the villa was laid out, was the fountain from the main piazza of Bassano di Sutri, near Viterbo, which Deering and Chalfin were convinced was by Vignola. Rather than displaying it in the central axis, Suarez sited it at the end of its own cross-axis, not to be discovered until the visitor had penetrated deep into the plan. The design was richly patterned on the ground, with parterres en broderie in the French baroque taste, contrasts of sun and shade, and many slight changes of level to enliven the essentially flat site.

=== Suarez House ===
In 1952, in collaboration with the architect Frederic Rhinelander King, Suarez completed a neoclassical house with extensive gardens at Brookville, New York.

== Marriage ==
In 1937, in Monterey, California, Diego Suarez married Evelyn Marshall Field (1888–1979), the daughter of Charles Henry Marshall and first wife of department-store heir Marshall Field III. Evelyn was a sister-in-law of the future Brooke Astor. By that marriage, Suarez had three stepchildren: Barbara Field, Bettine Field, and Marshall Field IV.

== Burial ==
He is interred at Woodlawn Cemetery in The Bronx, New York City.
