= SS City of Paris (1920) =

History

United Kingdom
- Name: City of Paris
- Operator: Ellerman Lines Ltd, London
- Port of registry: (United Kingdom) Glasgow
- Builder: Swan, Hunter & Wigham Richardson, Wallsend
- Yard number: 1129
- Launched: 24 December 1920
- Completed: February 1922
- Identification: UK official number: 146256
- Fate: Scrapped 1956

General characteristics
- Type: Passenger steamship
- Tonnage: 10,902 GRT; tonnage under deck 9423; 6,865 NRT
- Length: 484.7 ft (147.7 m)
- Beam: 59.3 ft (18.1 m)
- Draught: 43 ft 0 in (13.11 m)
- Depth: 32.6 ft (9.9 m)
- Decks: 2
- Installed power: 1,315 NHP
- Propulsion: 3 steam turbines, double-reduction geared onto one propeller shaft

SS City of Paris was a steam passenger ship launched in 1920 and completed in 1922 for the Ellerman Lines. She was requisitioned for service by the British government during the Second World War.

== History ==
City of Paris was built in 1922 by Swan, Hunter & Wigham Richardson, at their yards in Wallsend, Tyne and Wear, for Ellerman Lines Ltd, of London. She was registered in Glasgow.

On 17 October 1933, City of Paris ran aground in the Mediterranean Sea off France's Saraman Lighthouse. She was refloated the next day.

On 16 September 1939, whilst carrying 139 people during World War II, the ship struck a mine that had been laid by the German submarine U-13 on 4 September. She was damaged, with one person being killed, but managed to make it to port for repairs. In May 1940, Ellerman Lines offered her, the SS City of Simla, and the SS City of Benares, for use as an evacuation ship. On 10 September 1940 she set sail with a large batch of CORB children, and she reached Cape Town successfully. Due to the tragic sinking of the City of Benares, she never carried evacuee children again. In 1941 she carried artillery equipment to Ethiopia for use in the Battle of Gondar (November 1941). In early February 1942 she carried the 2/14th Battalion of the Australian Army from Bombay to Australia, arriving in Adelaide, South Australia, on 24 March 1942.

City of Paris was converted into a personnel ship in 1944, and used as an accommodation ship from September 1945 until 1946. She was then briefly used again as a troopship before being returned to the Ellerman Lines. She was returned to commercial service in 1947 and scrapped in 1956.
