= Miami Today =

Newspaper in Miami, Florida

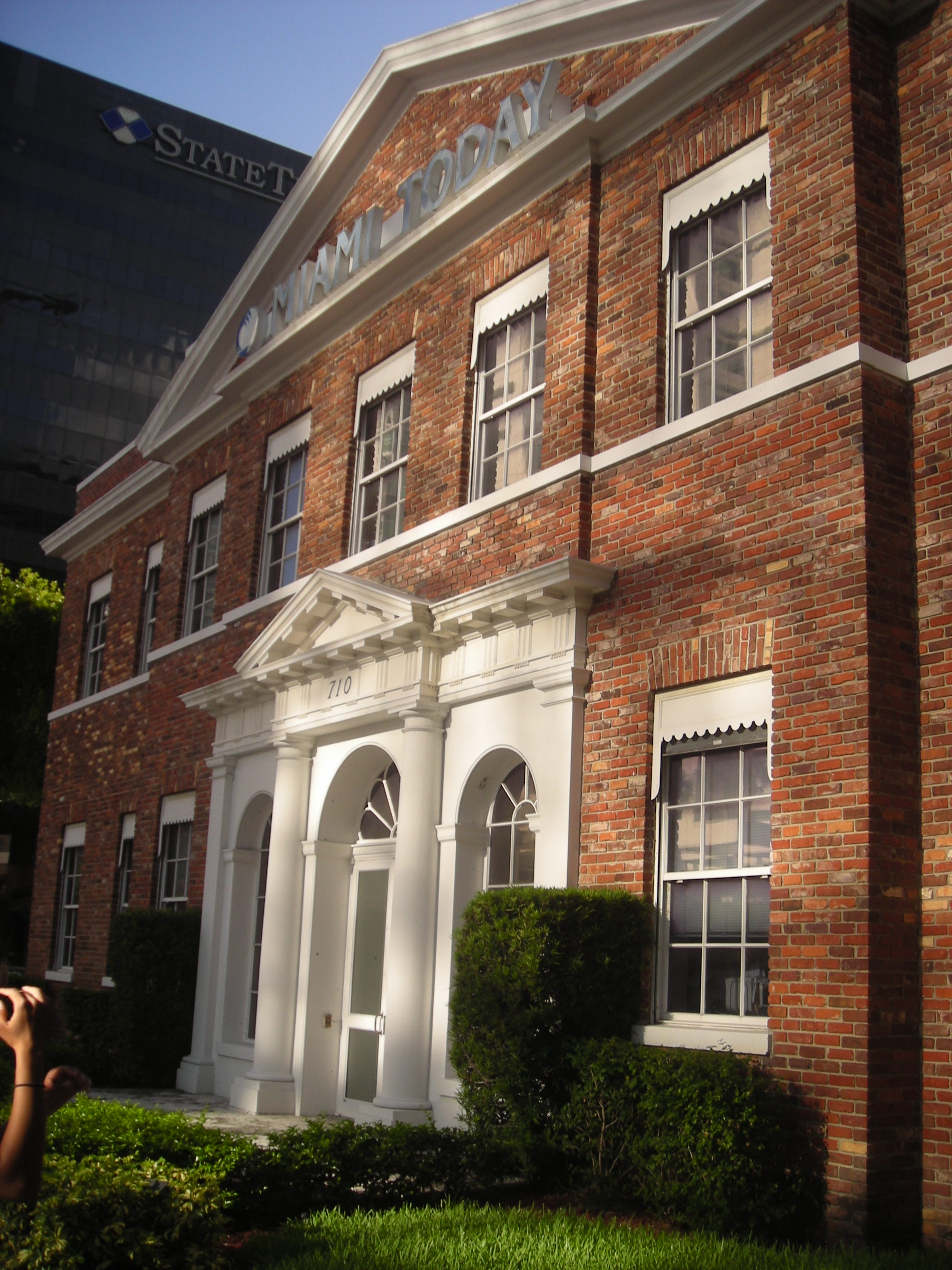
- Now demolished Miami Today headquarters on Brickell Avenue
- Type: Weekly business newspaper
- Format: Tabloid
- Owner: Today Enterprises
- Publisher: Michael Lewis
- Editor: Michael Lewis
- Founded: 1983
- Headquarters: 2000 South Dixie Highway, Suite 100; Miami, Florida 33133; United States
- Circulation: 7,491 Average print circulation
- Website: miamitodaynews.com

Miami Today is a weekly newspaper headquartered in the Coconut Grove neighborhood of Miami, Florida. The newspaper reports on business, government and civic life in Miami-Dade County commenting on the economy, real estate and development, banking, finance, the economics of health care and medicine, local transportation, small business, business organizations, higher education economics, newsmakers, achievers and the links between business and government in Miami-Dade County.

Miami Today was founded in 1983 by Gloria Brown Anderson and Michael Lewis.

Michael Lewis is Miami Today's editor-in-chief and publisher and has been honored as the top editorial writer in the nation by the National Newspaper Association. He founded the Book of Leaders in 1997 and MiamiTodayNews.com in 2000.

In 2011, Miami Today was awarded seven distinct awards from the Florida Press Association. In 2012, Miami Today received four journalism awards from the Florida Press Association, and five awards from the National Newspaper Association.
