= Chapman Field =

Chapman Field may refer to:

- Chapman Field (airfield), a former military airfield in South Miami, Florida, United States
- Chapman Field (baseball), a baseball and softball park in Corpus Christi, Texas, United States
- Chapman Field (Miami), a government facility in South Miami-Dade County, Florida, United States
- Chapman Field Park, an urban park in metropolitan Miami, Florida, United States
- Chapman Memorial Field, an airport in Centerburg, Ohio, United States

== See also ==
- Chapman Stadium, football field in Tulsa, Oklahoma
