= Chapman Field Park =

Park in Coral Gables, Florida, US

- Interactive map of Chapman Field Park
- Type: Municipal
- Location: 13601 Old Cutler Road; Miami, Florida, U.S.
- Coordinates: 25°38′37.15″N 80°17′14.64″W
- Area: 483 acres (1.95 km^{2}); 51 acres (0.21 km^{2}), land
- Created: 1949
- Operator: Miami-Dade Parks and Recreation Department
- Website: www.miamidade.gov/parks/chapman.asp

Chapman Field Park is a 483-acre (1.95 km^{2}) urban park in the southern part of Coral Gables, Florida, on historic Old Cutler Road. Of its 493 acres (2.00 km^{2}), 432 acres (1.75 km^{2}) remain as mangrove forests and saltwater estuaries; 51 acres (21 ha) is developed as a park.

== History ==
The property was first used as an army airfield in World War I. It was later declared surplus and in 1923 the United States Department of Agriculture began using 160 acres (0.65 km^{2}) as a plant introduction garden. As early as 1940 the county expressed an interest in acquiring the remaining property.

In 1947, an additional 37 acres (150,000 m^{2}) was added to the garden leaving 633 acres (2.56 km^{2}), and the property was declared surplus by the War Department. In 1949, the University of Miami bought 150 acres (0.61 km^{2}) for the Rosenstiel School of Marine, Atmospheric, and Earth Science and the county the remaining 483 acres (1.95 km^{2}).

The University of Miami did not utilize their portion and in 1956 a local developer took their portion under a long-term lease to build a golf course. This portion has gone through several owners.

As of 1990, it was called Deering Bay and owned by Armando Codina and others. The lease was extended through 2030. Little has been done to develop the park since the county acquired it in 1949. Money from the Decade of Progress bonds in 1972 led to the construction of three lighted baseball fields.

== Facilities ==
The park features three baseball fields. Both the Howard Palmetto Khoury League and the Howard Palmetto Baseball/Softball Association formerly played at the park. The baseball/softball fields and related batting cages, etc. were closed due to environmental concerns (arsenic contamination) in 2014 and are now overgrown. There is a canoe and kayak ramp as well, which remain open and accessible.
