= Charles Deering =

American businessman, art collector and philanthropist

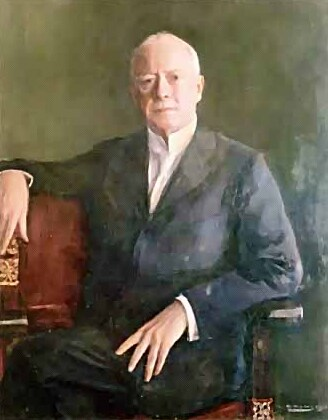
- Ramon Casas i Carbó portrait of Charles Deering, c. 1914. Maricel Museum Sitges, Barcelona
- Born: July 31, 1852; South Paris, Maine, U.S.
- Died: February 5, 1927 (aged 74); Miami, Florida, U.S.
- Spouses: Ana Rogers Case (m. 1875; died 1876) Marion Dennison Whipple (m. 1883)
- Children: 4

Signature
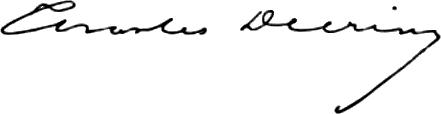

Charles Deering (July 31, 1852 – February 5, 1927) was an American businessman, art collector, and philanthropist. He was an executive of the agricultural machinery company founded by his father that became International Harvester. Charles's successful stewardship of the family firm left him with the means and leisure to indulge his interests in the arts and natural sciences. His activities and benefactions in the US were centered on Chicago and Miami; he also aspired to found an art museum in Spain.

== Early life ==
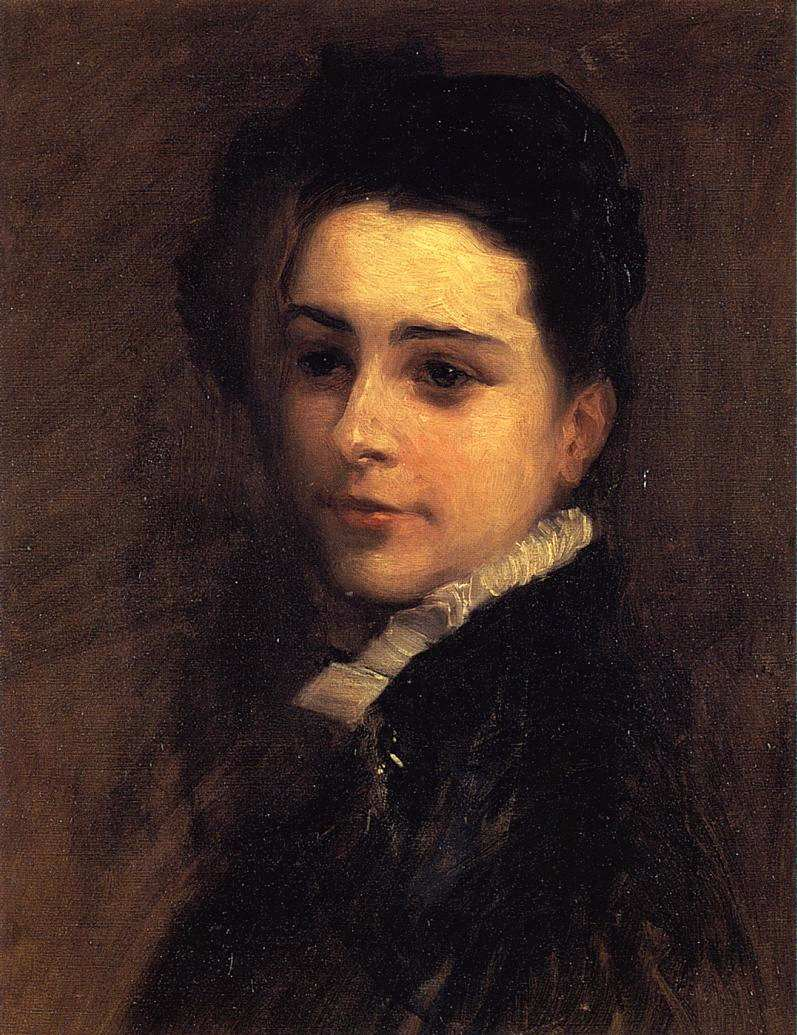
Mrs. Charles Deering, John Singer Sargent

Deering was born July 31, 1852, in South Paris, Maine, the son of Abby Reed Barbour and William Deering. His father was a successful businessman then engaged in real estate speculation and the manufacture and sale of woolens. In 1856, Charles's mother died, and, the following year, his father married Clara Barbour Cummings Hamilton, a cousin of his late wife. The two children of this marriage were James Deering (1859–1925) and Abby Marion Deering (later Mrs Richard Flint Howe). Charles remained close to his half-brother and sister throughout his life.

Charles attended Kents Hill School, graduating in June 1869. At first, he set his sights on a career in the Navy. Obtaining a midshipman's warrant, he entered the United States Naval Academy at Annapolis, where he graduated second in the class of 1873. He served as a naval officer until 1881, when he resigned in order to join his father's company. Naval service shaped Deering by exposing him to the cultures of Europe and Asia. He supplemented these experiences with extensive personal travel, developing cosmopolitan tastes, a cosmopolitan outlook, and a particular affinity with the arts of Spain. While still in the Navy, Charles met and married Ana Rogers Case, the daughter of Rear Admiral Augustus Ludlow Case; the couple wed in 1875 in Newport, Rhode Island. Ana Deering died October 31, 1876, shortly after giving birth to a son, Charles Case Deering (1876–1924).

Deering was a gifted amateur artist, and while still in the Navy he used his free time to become acquainted with leading artists and to visit the world's great art galleries. He began a lifelong habit of collecting art, both by acknowledged masters and contemporaries. In 1876, he met the painter John Singer Sargent, who became a close friend. Other artist-friends included sculptor Augustus St. Gaudens, the Swedish artist Anders Zorn, and Catalan artist Ramon Casas i Carbo. In 1893, Deering took time off from his other duties to study painting in Paris under Zorn for an entire season. Throughout his life, Deering enthusiastically supported and championed the work of many living artists while also avidly purchasing hundreds of older, more obscure works along with many acknowledged masterpieces.

== Business career ==
By 1881, William Deering's business activities had shifted to Illinois, where some earlier investments had led to his founding the Deering Harvester Company. As it grew, he enlisted both his sons in running the company. Charles moved to Chicago, taking up permanent residence in Evanston and becoming the company's secretary. His father retired in 1901. In 1902, J. P. Morgan financed a deal that combined Deering Harvester and the company founded by Cyrus McCormick, along with several others, to form the International Harvester Company. Charles Deering became chairman of the board of the newly created company. He served in this capacity until 1910, when he retired.

== Art patronage and collecting ==
Deering devoted the rest of his life to art collecting and to the creation of several estates in the United States and Europe. Deering dreamed of creating an art center in Spain, and in 1910 he had the Palau Maricel built with the help of the artist Miquel Utrillo in Sitges, a town just south of Barcelona. The building was connected by a bridge across the lane to a second building he purchased, which now houses the Museu Maricel. A portrait of him by Catalan artist Ramon Casas i Carbó can be seen in the museum, which is open to visitors. The Palau Maricel is also open to visitors. Deering's hope was that the complex would become a magnet for artists and artistic life, where people of many nations would come to make art and study. In addition, Deering's own large and many-sided collection of Spanish art and decorative objects would be on display. In the end, however, Deering abandoned much of this plan. Instead, much of his collection was given to the Art Institute of Chicago, while other works were transferred to his estate at Cutler, Florida. One of his commissioned works, Serenity, is on display in Washington, D.C., and was dedicated to Deering's lifelong friend and Naval Academy roommate, William H. Schuetze.

== Florida estates ==
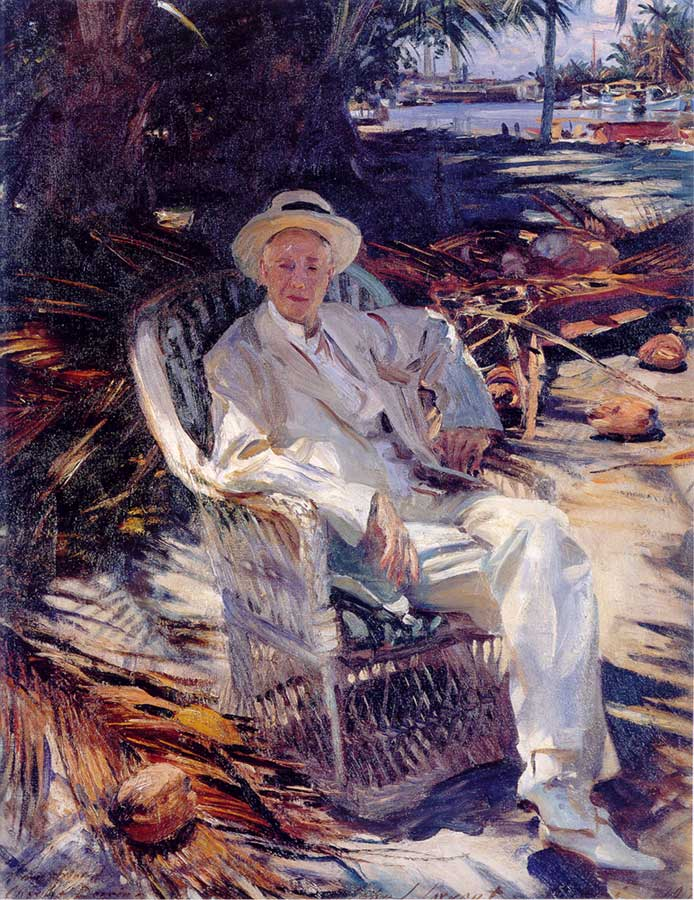
Charles Deering, at Brickell Point, Miami, 1917, by John Singer Sargent

Beginning around 1890, the William Deerings began wintering in Florida, first around St. Augustine, and later in the vicinity of Miami. Visiting them, both Charles and his half-brother became deeply interested in South Florida. Around 1908, Charles purchased some 212 acres of land in Buena Vista. In 1910, he hired Clinton Mackenzie to design a Spanish-style villa for the property. He hired the great Chicago landscape architect Ossian Cole Simonds to lay out the grounds. Here he supported the New York Botanical Garden by providing them 25 acres to grow cacti. Around this time, Deering made the acquaintance of botanist David Fairchild and allowed the US Department of Agriculture to establish an experimental station on 25 acres of his property. Deering became an avid naturalist and preservationist. The book Ornamental Gardening in Florida by Charles Simpson is dedicated to him.

Deering correctly foresaw that development would soon engulf the Buena Vista property, and by 1913 he had begun buying land further down on the coast, along Old Cutler Road. By 1915, he had acquired several hundred acres near Cutler and moved his winter quarters there permanently. His Buena Vista estate was broken up by developers during the land boom of 1925. Deering built a fine stone house on his second property. Now named the Charles Deering Estate, it is open to the public as a museum and nature preserve. Meanwhile, his brother James built an estate, Villa Vizcaya, on Biscayne Bay in Coconut Grove.

Charles Deering was also a member of the famous Jekyll Island Club (aka the Millionaires Club) on Jekyll Island, Georgia.

== Family ==
In 1883, Deering had married Marion Dennison Whipple, the daughter of Major General William Dennison Whipple. The Deerings had three children: Roger, Marion, and Barbara (later Mrs. Richard Ely Danielson).

On July 6, 1914, Deering's daughter Marion (1887–1965) married Chauncey McCormick in Paris over his objections. After a civil ceremony, a religious rite was held at James Deering's Paris residence. Mrs. McCormick became a patron of art in Chicago and "one of the nation's richest women". Her son Brooks McCormick (1917–2006) was the last family member to head International Harvester.

== Death and memorial library ==
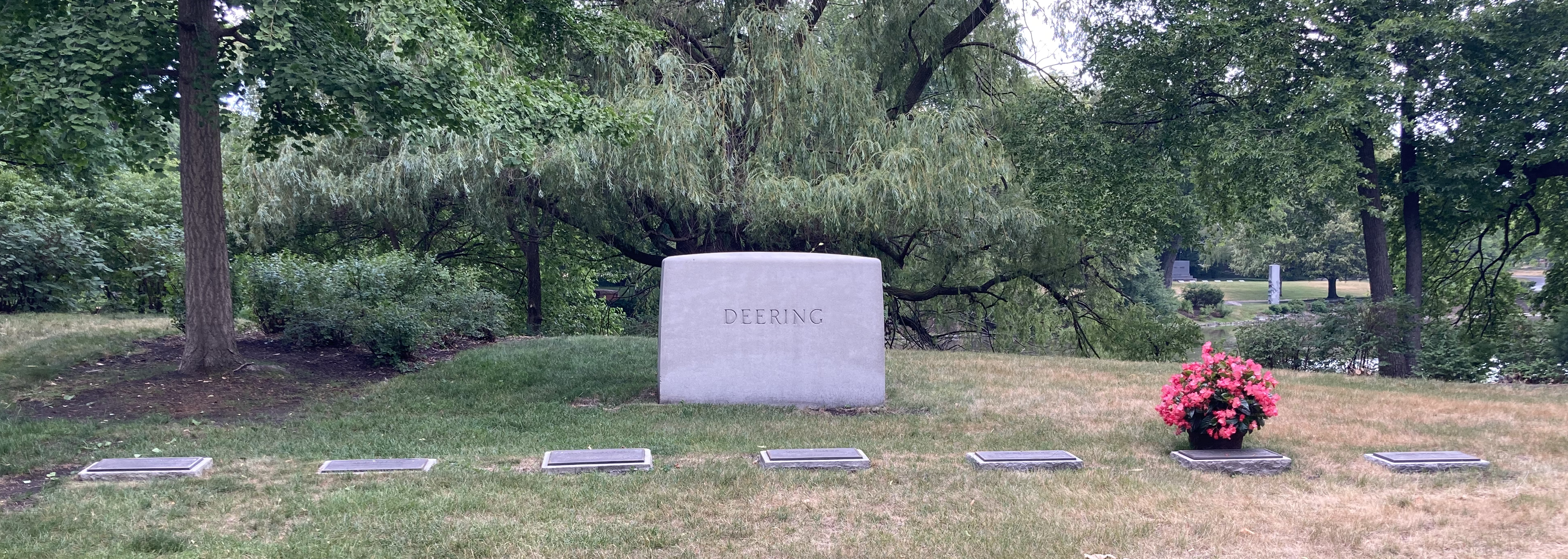
Deering's grave at Graceland Cemetery

Deering died on February 5, 1927, in Miami.

In 1930, construction began on the Charles Deering Library at Northwestern University in Evanston, Illinois. Funding was provided primarily through donations made by the Deering, McCormick, and Danielson families. Dedicated in 1933, it served as Northwestern's primary library until 1970, when an adjacent library was constructed. The Deering Library now houses certain special collections of the Northwestern University Library, along with art, music, and the University Archives. Deering's son Roger (1884–1936) was also a patron of the arts and a benefactor of Northwestern.

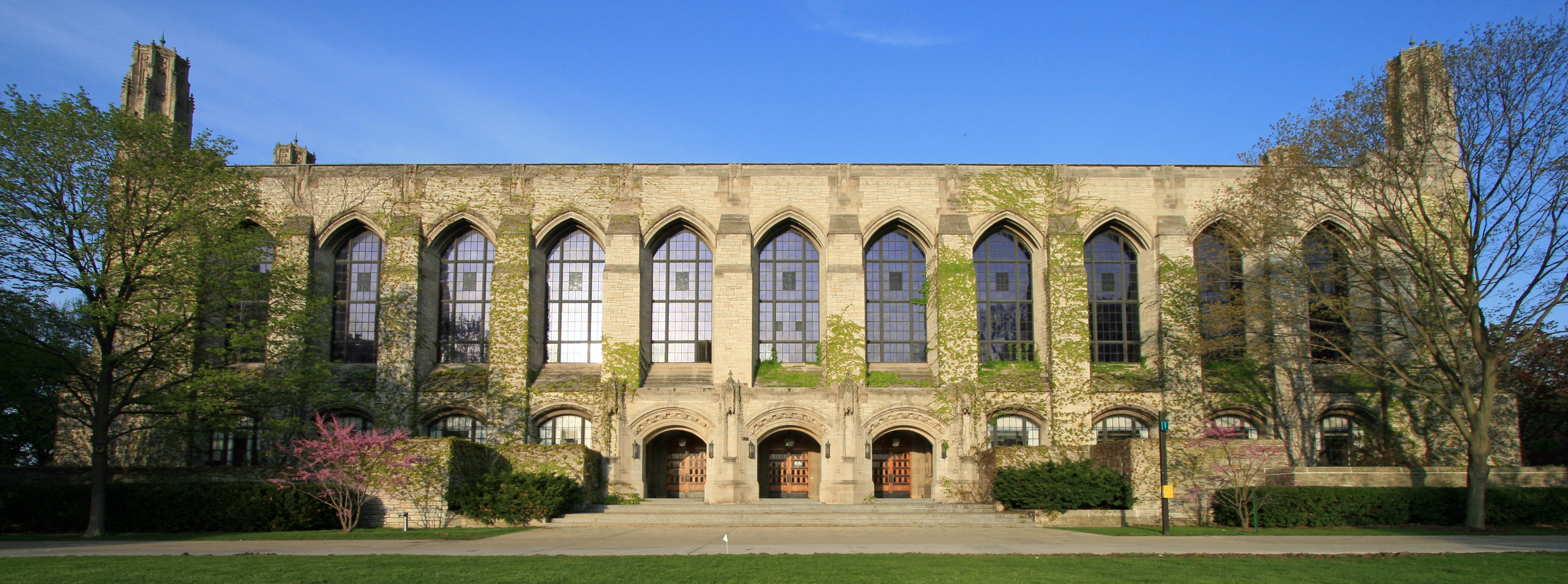
Deering Library at Northwestern University
