= Charles Deering Estate =

United States historic place

- Deering Estate
- U.S. National Register of Historic Places
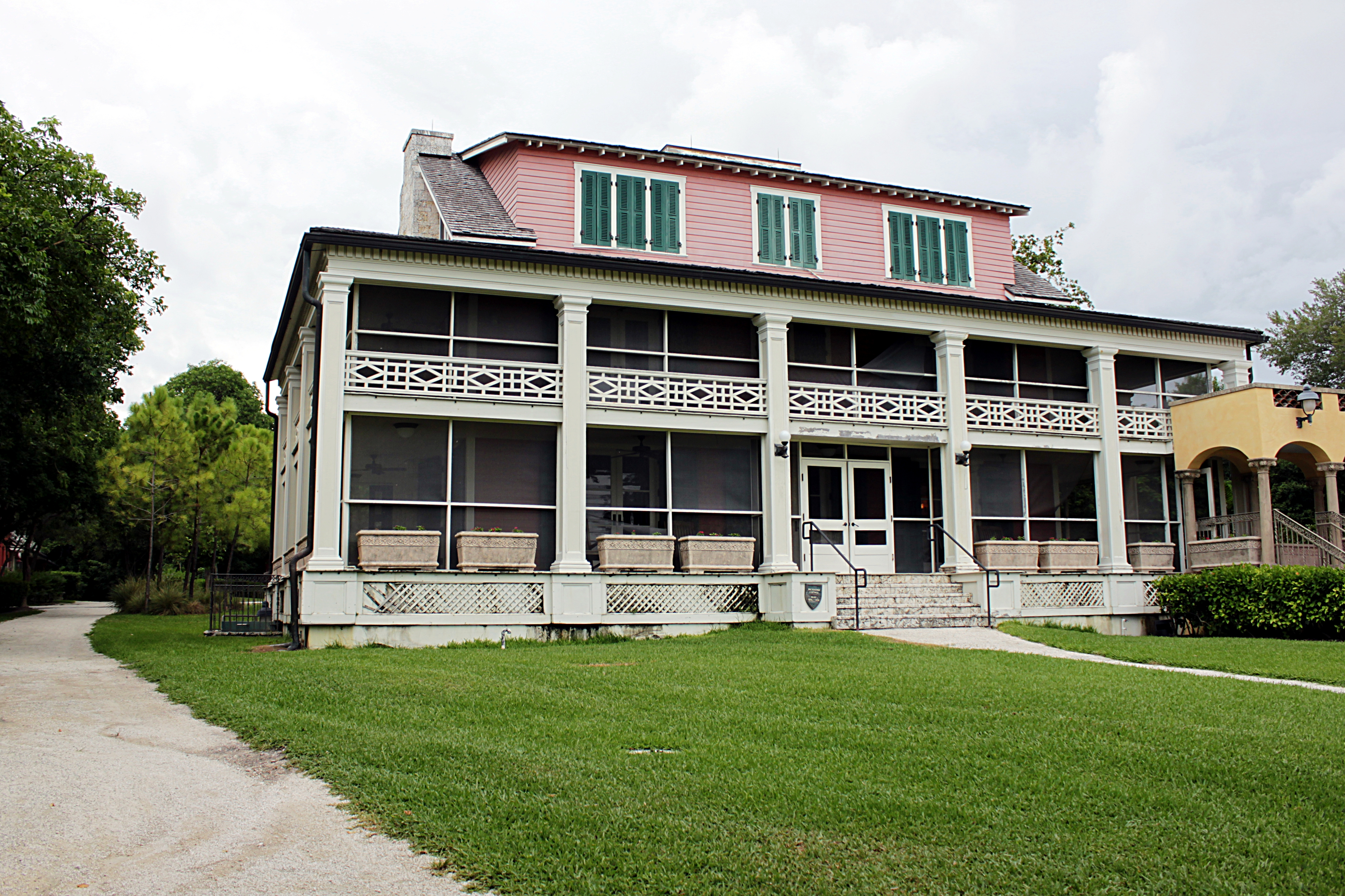
- The Richmond Cottage as it looks today.

- Location within Miami Location within Florida Location within the United States
- Location: Palmetto Bay, Florida, USA
- Coordinates: 25°36′56.217″N 80°18′23.3388″W
- Website: deeringestate.org
- NRHP reference No.: 86000325
- Added to NRHP: 11 March 1986

Deering Estate (previously known as Deering Estate at Cutler) is the former Florida home of Charles Deering until 1927 when he died at the estate. The Charles Deering Estate rests on 444 acres and comprises two buildings known as the Richmond Cottage and the Stone House. Both buildings are used as historical museums that center the Deering family. Both homes are filled with paintings, artifacts, books and antique furnishings.

== Description ==
Deering lived on the 444 acres (1.80 km^{2}) property for five years, from 1922 to 1927. The property consists of a three-story wooden house built in 1900, known as the Richmond Cottage, and a three-story stone mansion. Other buildings were also built on the property to serve as auxiliary buildings to the estate. Charles Deering Estate is located in the Cutler neighborhood of Palmetto Bay, Florida.

The grounds include what is thought to be the largest virgin coastal tropical hardwood hammock in the continental United States. The estate was acquired by the state of Florida in 1985.

The estate is owned by the State of Florida and is managed by the Miami-Dade County Parks, Recreation and Open Spaces Department.

After the death of Charles Deering in 1927 the property was maintained by his family. The property became available for sale after his daughter died in 1982. The estate was purchased in 1984 by Finley Matheson, who fought to get it turned into a state park. In 1985 the State of Florida purchased the land for $22.5 million.

The Deering Estate is a national landmark listed on the National Register of Historic Places. It became part of the National Register of Historic places in 1986 by meeting the requirements in all categories. It is also part of the Organization of Biological Field Stations through its collaboration with Florida International University School of Environment, Arts and Society. By being part of the organization they receive assistance in order to improve their effectiveness in supporting critical research, education and outreach programs.

For more than 30 years, researchers have studied the unique ecological, geological and archaeological features of the property. The Deering Estate is situated in the only portion of the Everglades Restoration Project within an urban setting and which is easily accessed by the public. In August 2019, the Deering Estate Foundation was granted $200,000 for capital improvements. This will expand the cultural and ecological field station and research site. The funds will provide renovations for a 10,700 square-foot field study research center. The research facility will provide temporary living quarters for up to 14 researchers, an archival library and a field staff office for the Deering Estate and Deering Estate Foundation.

The house and grounds were featured several times in the 1980s TV series Miami Vice, and the estate was the starting location for The Amazing Race All-Stars in 2007.

== History ==
=== The Richmond Cottage ===
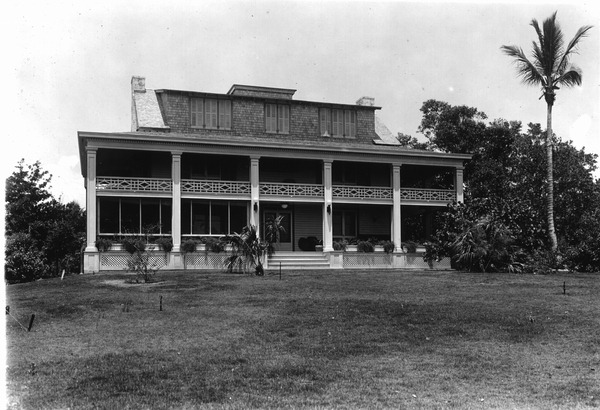
The Richmond Cottage a year after it was purchased by Charles Deering in 1916.

The Richmond Cottage was built by S. Howard Richmond, agent for the Perrine Land Grant Company, as his family home, at the end of the 19th century in what was then the pioneer town of Cutler. An addition which converted the home into a 22-room hotel was completed in 1900. The hotel was managed by Richmond's wife, Edith M. The Richmond Cottage was described as being the "most southerly hotel on the mainland of the United States".

Charles Deering bought the Richmond Cottage in 1916. Over the next several years he added different structures to the estate, including a carriage house, pump house and power house. He also enclosed his estate with a limestone and concrete wall and built the boat turning basin in Biscayne Bay. In 1922 he completed his three-story Mediterranean Stone House and moved to Cutler in 1922.

=== Stone House ===
Stone House was designed by Phineas Paist and was completed in 1922. It has 18 inch poured concrete walls, oolitic limestone, coffered ceilings and copper clad and brass doors. After the Great Chicago Fire of 1871, Charles Deering was nervous of what fire could do. He decided to build his Stone House without a stove. There was a kitchen that housed refrigeration cabinets and storage but the cooking was done in the Richmond Cottage. It was his trepidation of fire that had him asking the architect/designer for the 18 inch concrete walls and brass doors. He also added an elevator to the house which was very forward thinking for 1922. The large wine cellar that is located on the first floor was not discovered until after Hurricane Andrew. It was very well hidden behind built-in cabinetry. Hurricane Andrew flooded the first floor and damaged much of it. It was during the clean up process that it was discovered. He intended the house to be used as a showcase for his art collection and books.

=== Charles Deering ===
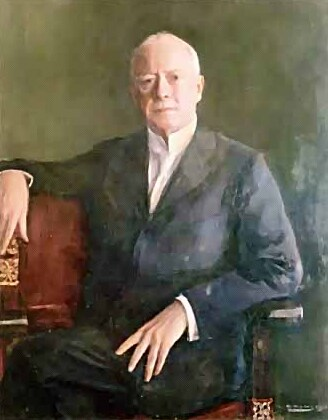
Portrait of Charles Deering, c. 1914 by Ramon Casas i Carbó

Charles Deering was born on July 31, 1852, in Paris, Maine. He was the son of William Deering, founder of Deering Harvester Company, and brother of millionaire industrialist James Deering. Deering is remembered as an American businessman and philanthropist.

In 1873 Deering graduated from the United States Naval Academy and served as an officer in the Navy until 1881. Deering then became secretary of his father's company, which merged with McCormick Harvesting Machine Company and became International Harvester in 1902. After the merger, Deering became the chairman of the board for International Harvester. Charles Deering died at the age of 75 at his estate at Cutler, at 11:30 P.M. on February 5, 1927. After Charles' death, the estate was left to his wife and children.

=== Cutler Burial Mound ===
The Cutler Burial Mound is a prehistoric mound on the Charles Deering Estate. It is one of the few surviving prehistoric mounds in Miami-Dade County. The mound is about 38 feet by 20 feet at the base, and about five feet high. Artifacts from the mound are from the Glades II and III periods. The mound has been disturbed repeatedly. Henry Perrine, Jr, son of Henry Perrine, removed several skulls from the mound in the 1860s while searching for Black Caesar's treasure. Ralph Munroe dug in the mound in the 1890s. In the 20th century, neighborhood children dug in the mound and removed bones and artifacts. Some of those bones have been returned and reburied in the mound. The mound is believed to contain 12 to 18 burials of Native Americans. The mound is accessible via a boardwalk.

=== Cutler Fossil Site ===
In 1979 a sinkhole on the Deering Estate was found to contain bones of Pleistocene animals associated with bones and artifacts of early humans. The site was eventually acquired by Miami-Dade County, and is now part of the Charles Deering Estate Park.

=== Hurricane Andrew ===
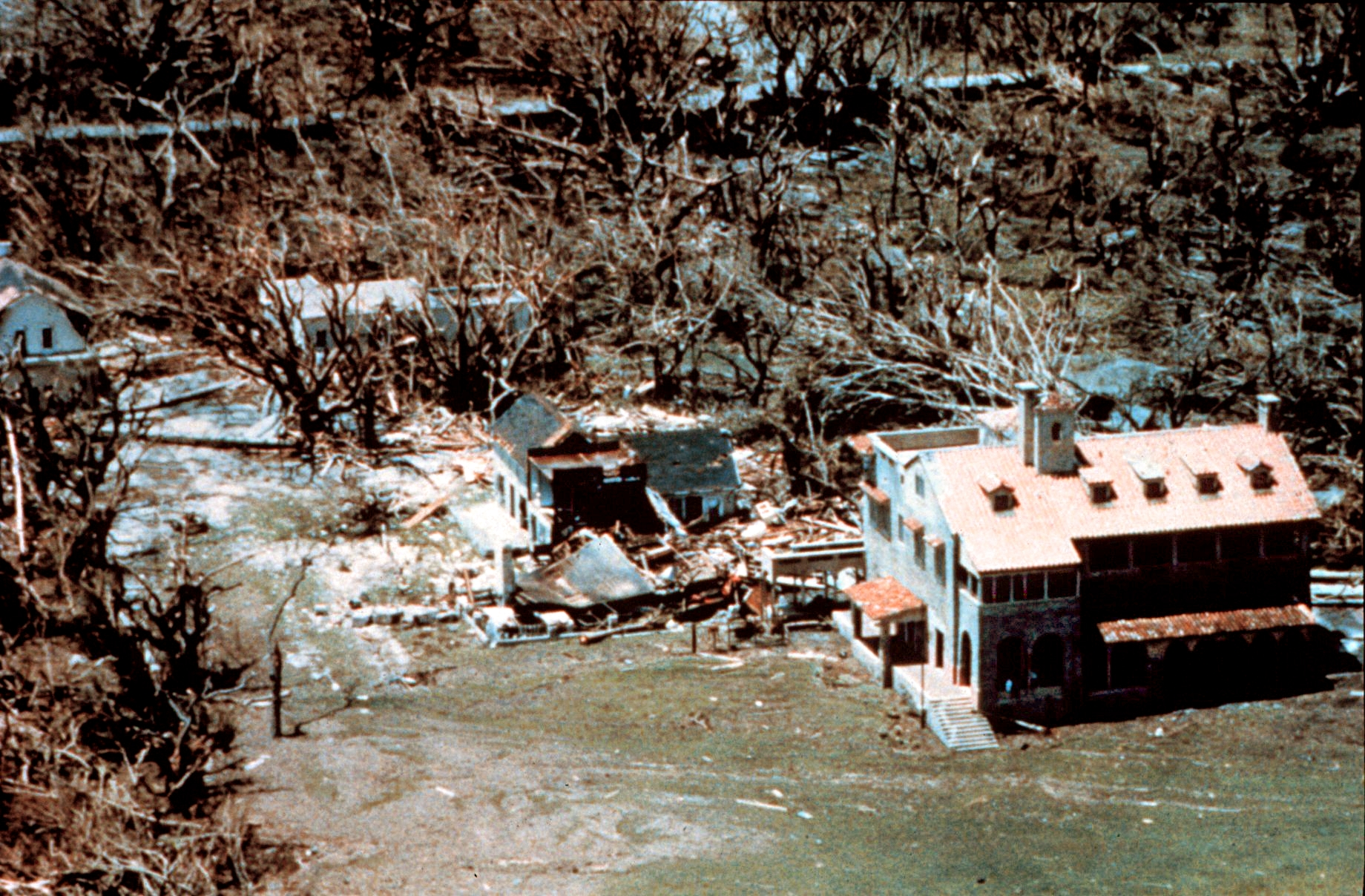
Buildings on the Deering Estate with still-water marks from storm surge measured at 16.5 feet (5.0 m)

On August 24, 1992, Hurricane Andrew struck South Florida as a Category 5 hurricane, the third-strongest tropical cyclone to make landfall in the United States, with winds of 165 mph (270 km/h). Andrew "destroyed 25,524 homes and damaged 101,241 others."

Hurricane Andrew ravaged and damaged the property of Deering Estate. The waterfront property was devastated by waves that reached as high as the second floor of the buildings. Water rose more than 16 feet (4.9 m) from sea level and caused major flooding on the property. The Richmond Cottage was taken off its foundation and splintered by the hurricane. It took seven years and $7.2 million to restore the location. Deering Estate at Cutler reopened to the public in 1999 and officially opened in 2000.

== The Arts at Deering Estate ==
The Deering Estate foundation has followed in Charles Deering's footsteps through their commitment to art and artists. The estate offers artists workshops and studio artists in-residence and studio not-in-residence programs. This program has been active since 2006 and has hosted over 90 residencies. To push artistic visibility throughout the community, the Deering Estate has collaborated with local partners that share the vision to promote art. Deering Estate also offers collaborations and partnerships with local universities such as Florida International University and Miami-Dade College. They also have connections to universities in Chicago (the Art Institute of Chicago) and Northwestern University in Illinois. It is through these schools that they offer internship-based learning. Exhibitions, performances and other collaborations are made through these connections.

== Events at Deering Estate ==
The Deering Estate hosts a plethora of events that center art and community bonding. The event list includes caroling, nature tours, historic kayaking adventures, night hikes, bird watching and ghost tours. The Estate also hosts community-action days where volunteers can help clean or beautify the landscape. Specifically for children aged six to fourteen, they host "Teacher Planning Days". These events occur on days that are teacher planning Days at their schools, where the children do not go into school, instead they can attend an informational day at The Deering Estate. During these days, the students get to explore science through nature. Additionally for students, the estate holds Homeschool Enrichment programs that are meant to help "provide a well rounded curriculum that will help support traditional schooling". These programs are split into three different age groups starting at age five and being available till age fourteen. Lastly, the Estate offers career enrichment workshops for adults. These workshops are for teachers and other members of the MDCPS community.

== The Deering Estate Foundation ==
The Deering Estate Foundation, Inc., organized in 1989 and strives, "to raise public awareness, outreach, understanding and the enjoyment of the Deering Estate at Cutler and to raise funds to support education, research, exhibits and collections, natural conservation and historical restoration and preservation." The offices of the foundation are located at 7241 Richmond Drive in Palmetto Bay, Florida. The Deering Estate Foundation is a community based charitable 501(c) Florida Corporation and the philanthropic partners of the Deering Estate.

The Deering Estate Foundation - Board of Directors
Executive Committee	Position	Directors	Trustees
Suzanne Gottlieb Calleja	President	Laura Beaton-Aguilera	Richard Cohen
_______	Vice President	Beth Brockway-Serrate	Ronald Esserman
Matias Perez	Treasurer	C. Michael Cornely	Lynn French
Walter Evanson	Secretary	Tom Cromer	James W. Harris
Carole Wright	Immediate Past President	Dr. Lyle Culver	Sallye Jude
		Peter A. England	Philip F. Ludovici
		Walter Flores	Heather Bell O'Brien
		Dr. Evelyn Gaiser	Edward Rosasco
		Eric T. Haas	Audrey Ross
		Col. Brodes Hartley, Jr.	Scott A. Silver
		Barry E. Johnson	David M. Turner
		Leonor M. Lagomasino	Karleton B. Wulf
		Paul Neidhart	Mary Young
		Patrick H. F. Roberts	
		Christine Stiphany	
		Jo Ann Szaro	
		Howard J. Tendrich	
		Jocelyn Tennille	
		Jamie L. Thomas	
		Andrew S. Yagoda	
		Daniel Yglesias	

== Gallery ==
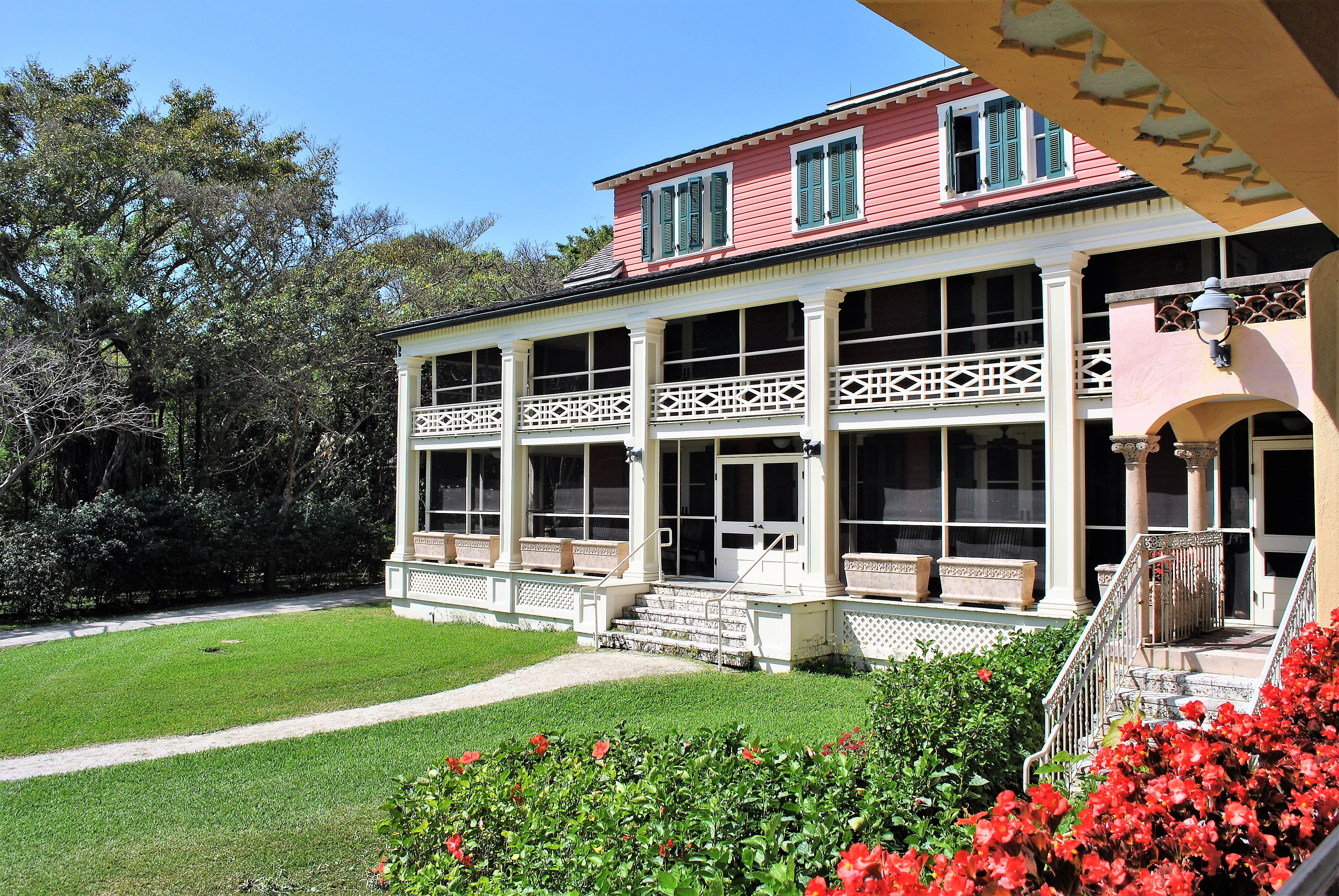

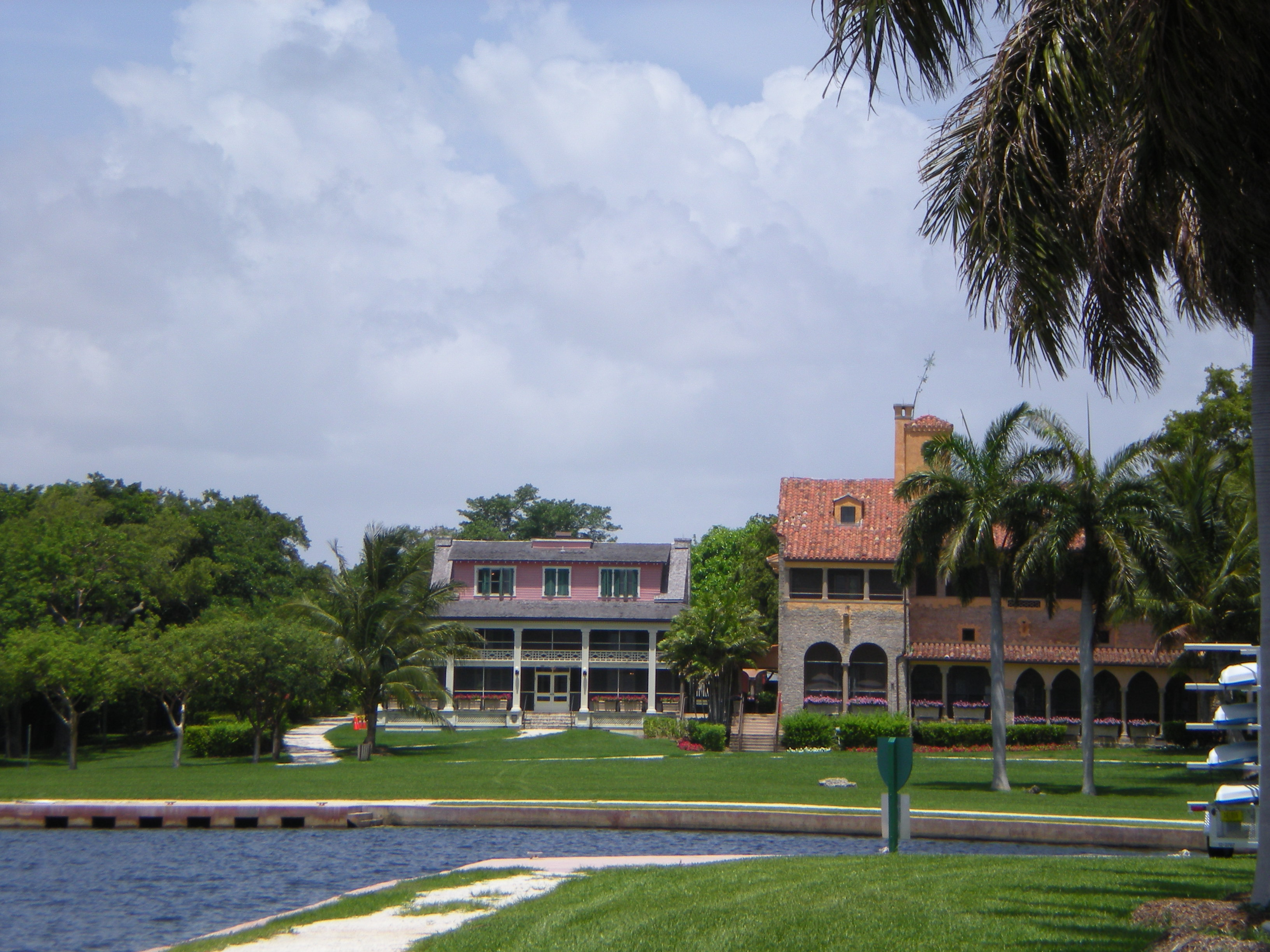
The Richmond Cottage (left) and the Stone House. View from the Atlantic

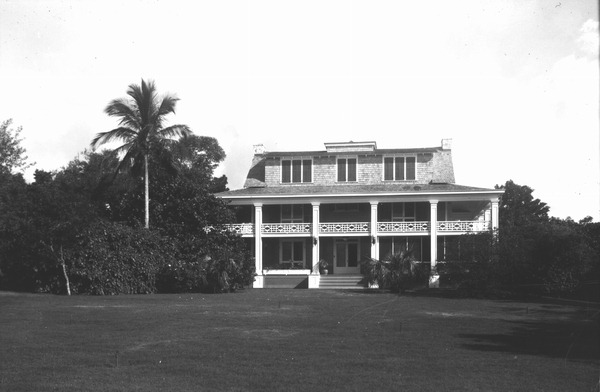
Charles Deering Estate Original House

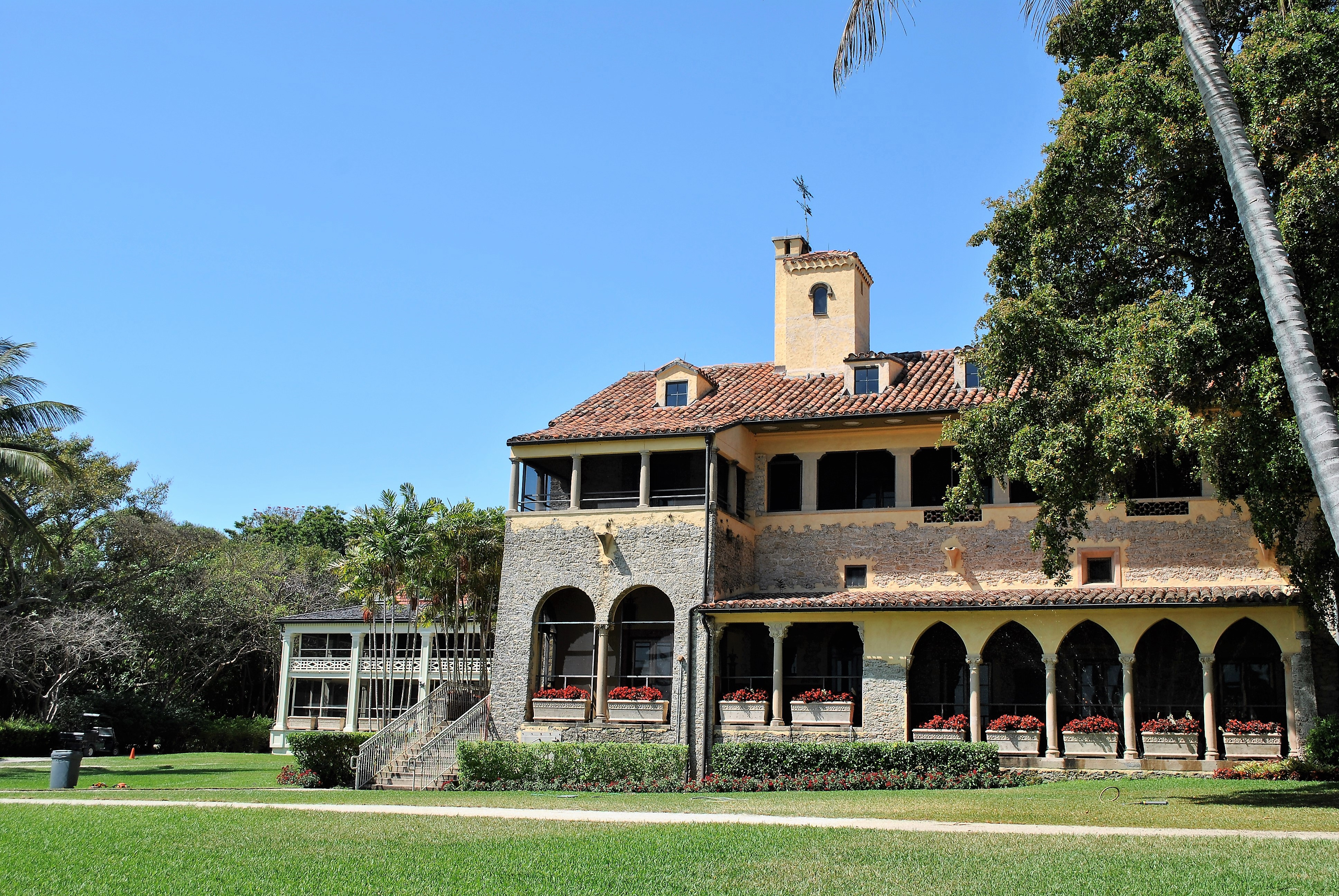
Charles Deering Estate

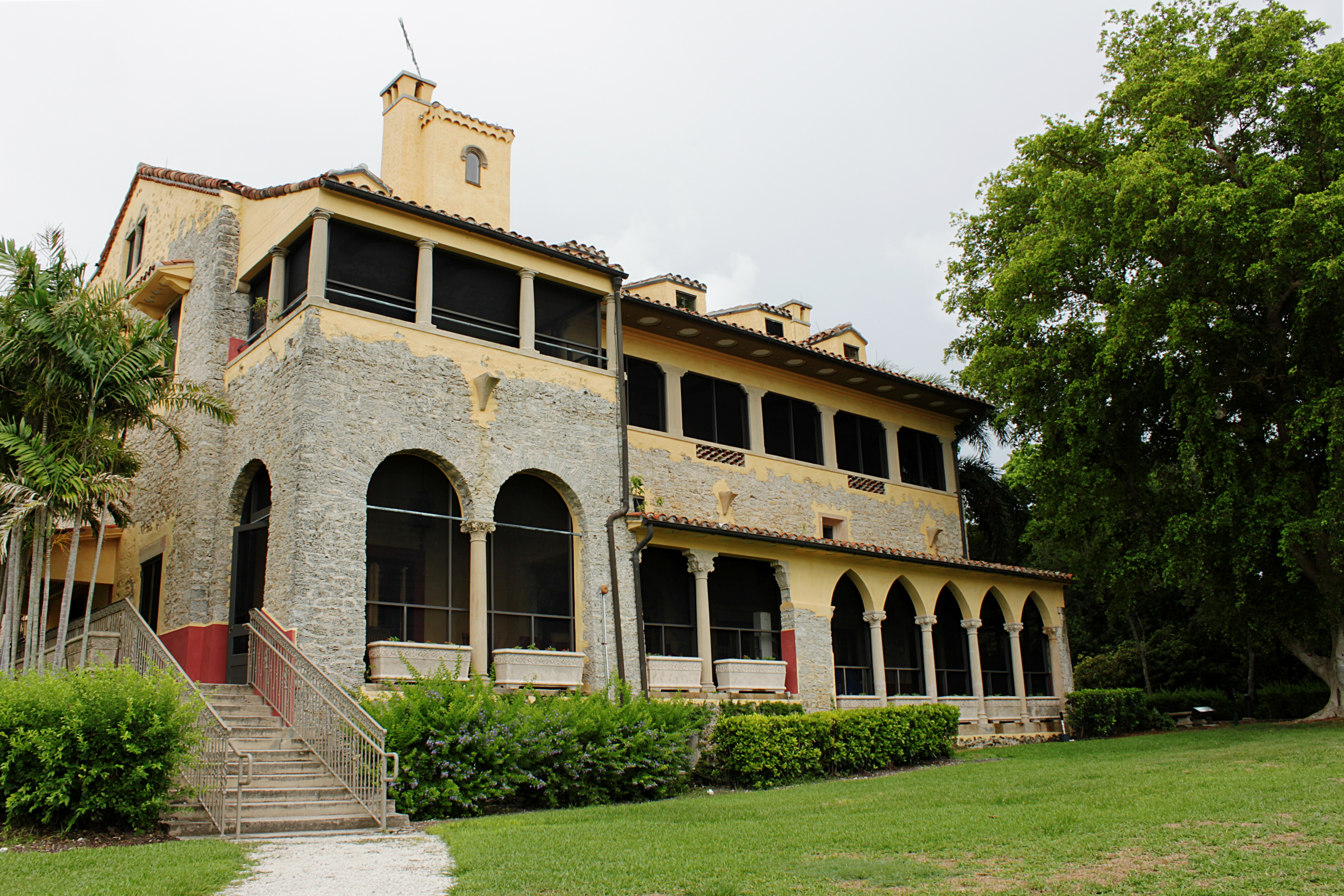
The side of the stone mansion that faces the east.

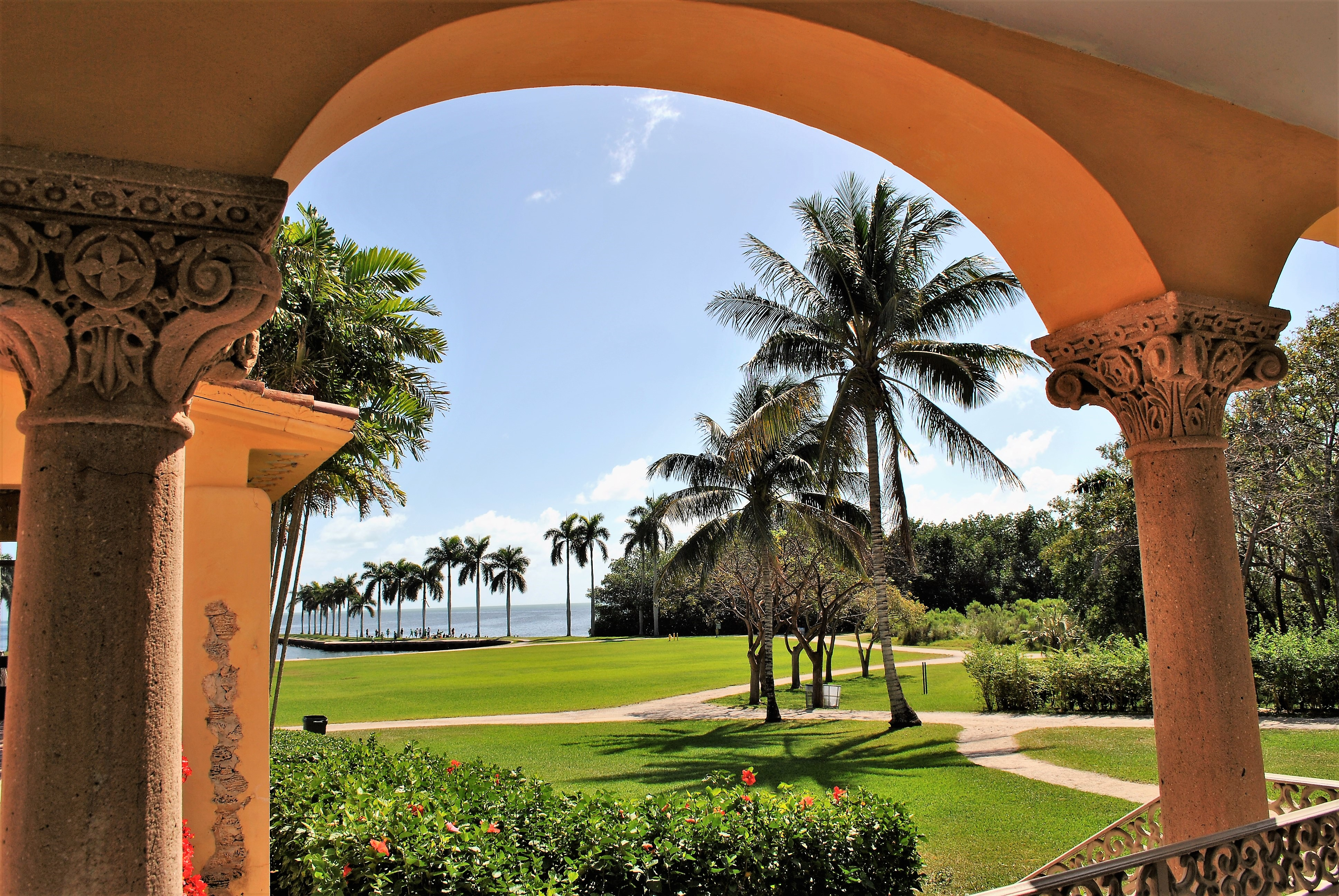
Charles Deering Estate

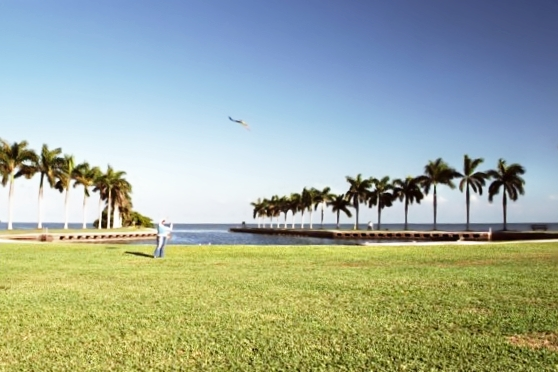
Photograph of Deering's lawn and key shaped dock

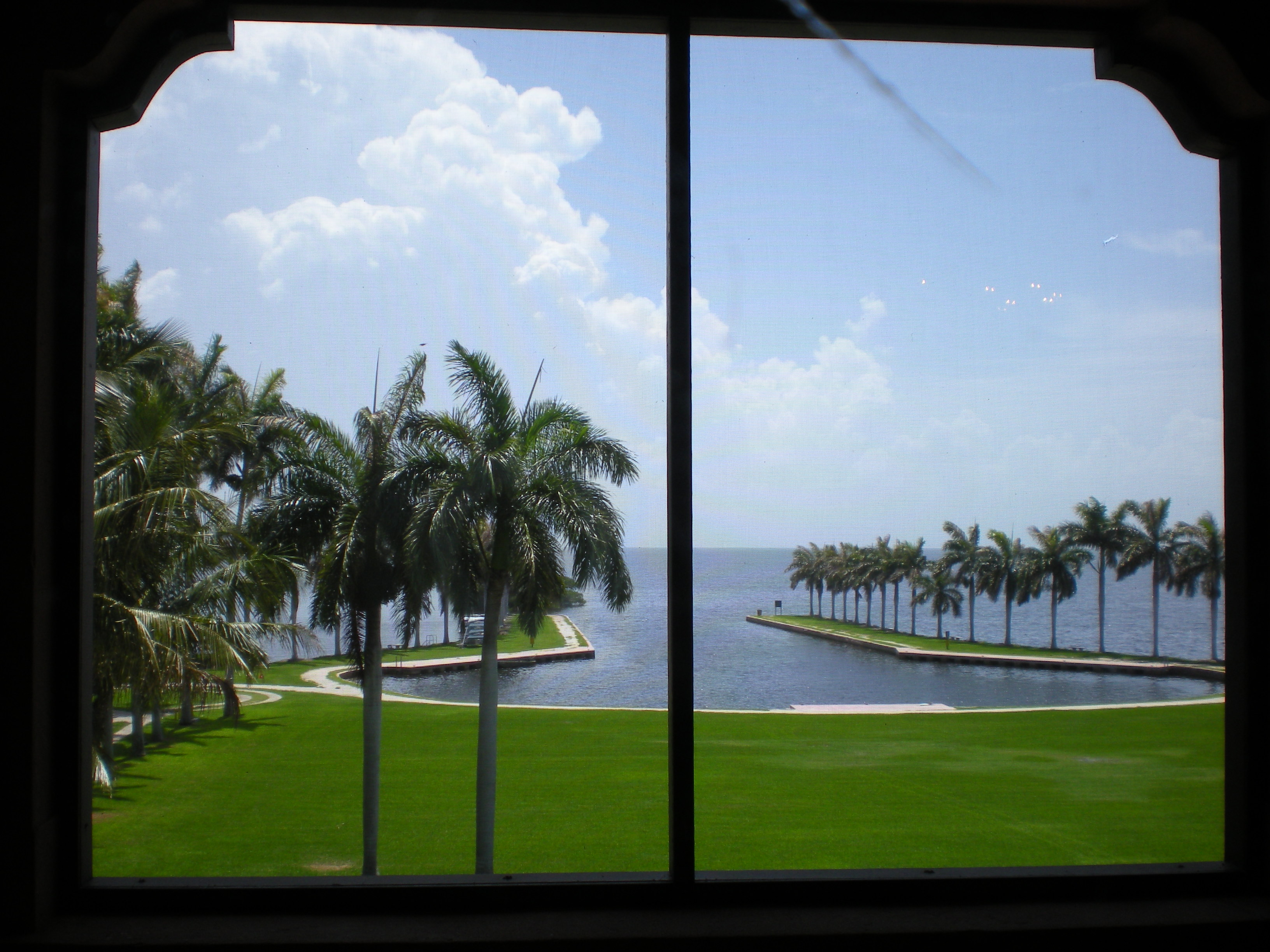
Looking out of the Stone House at Charles Deering Estate

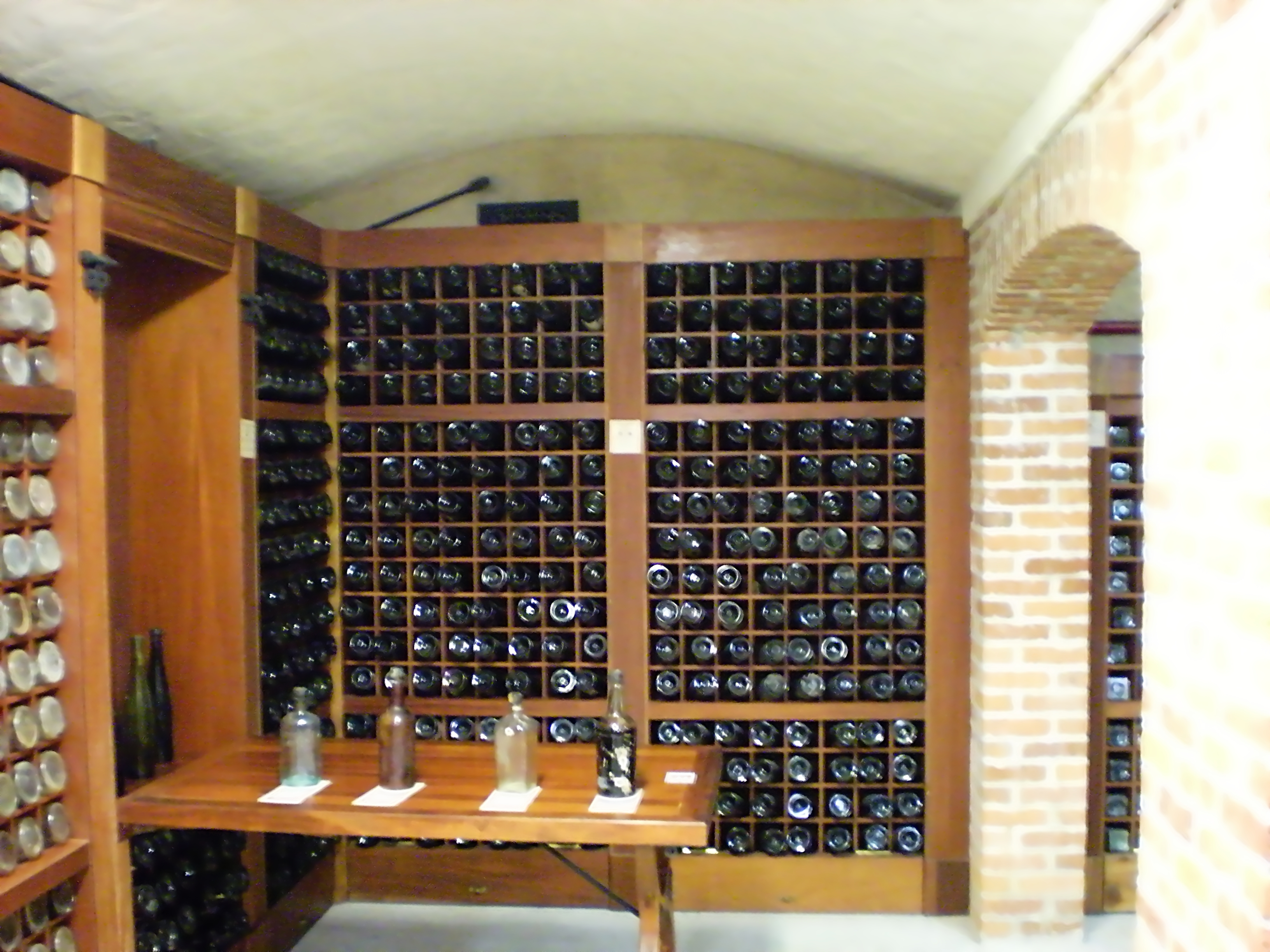
Charles Deering wine cellar in the Stone House (renovated)

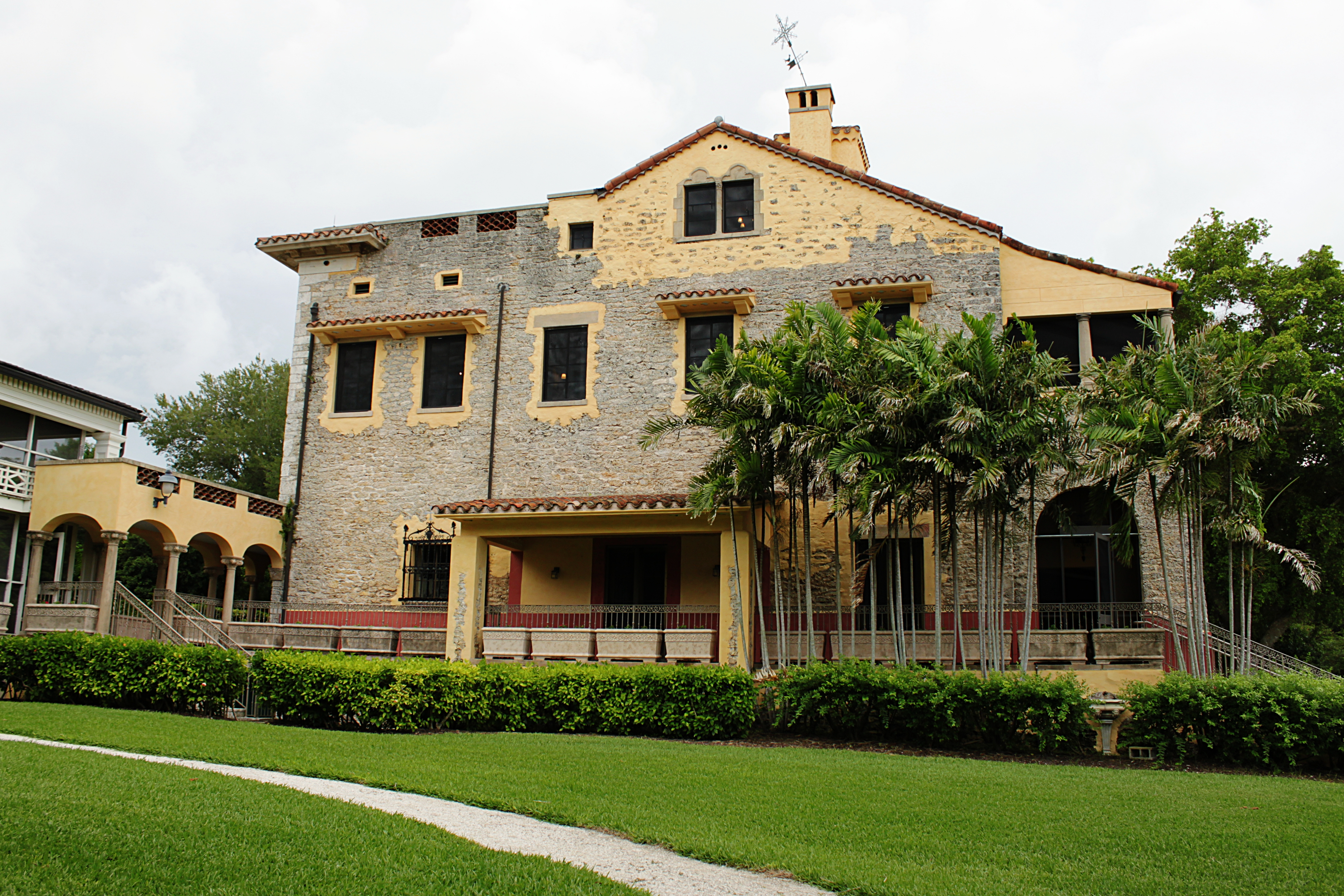
The side of the Stone mansion that faces the south.

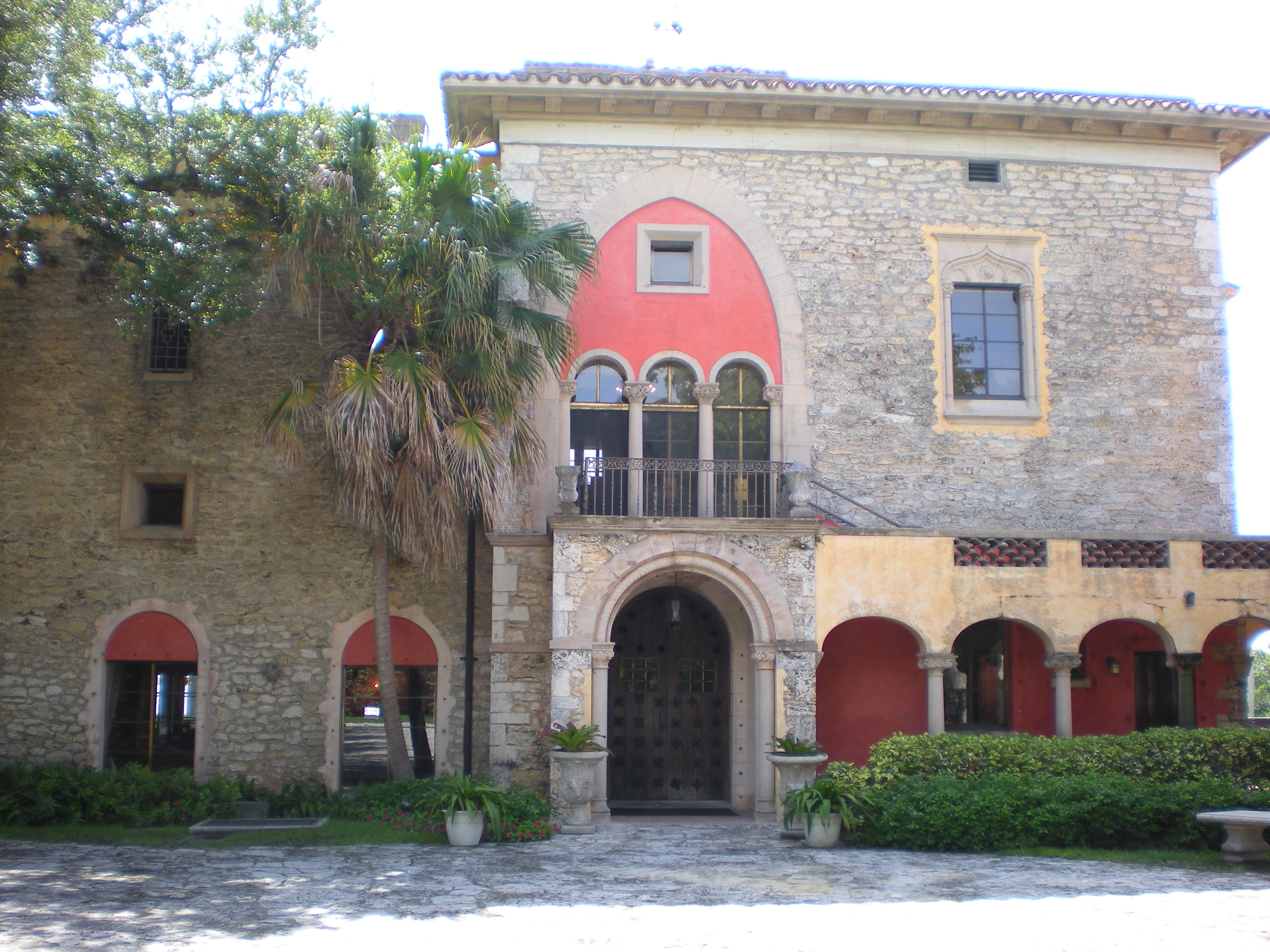
Stone House at Charles Deering Estate (looking from the main courtyard)

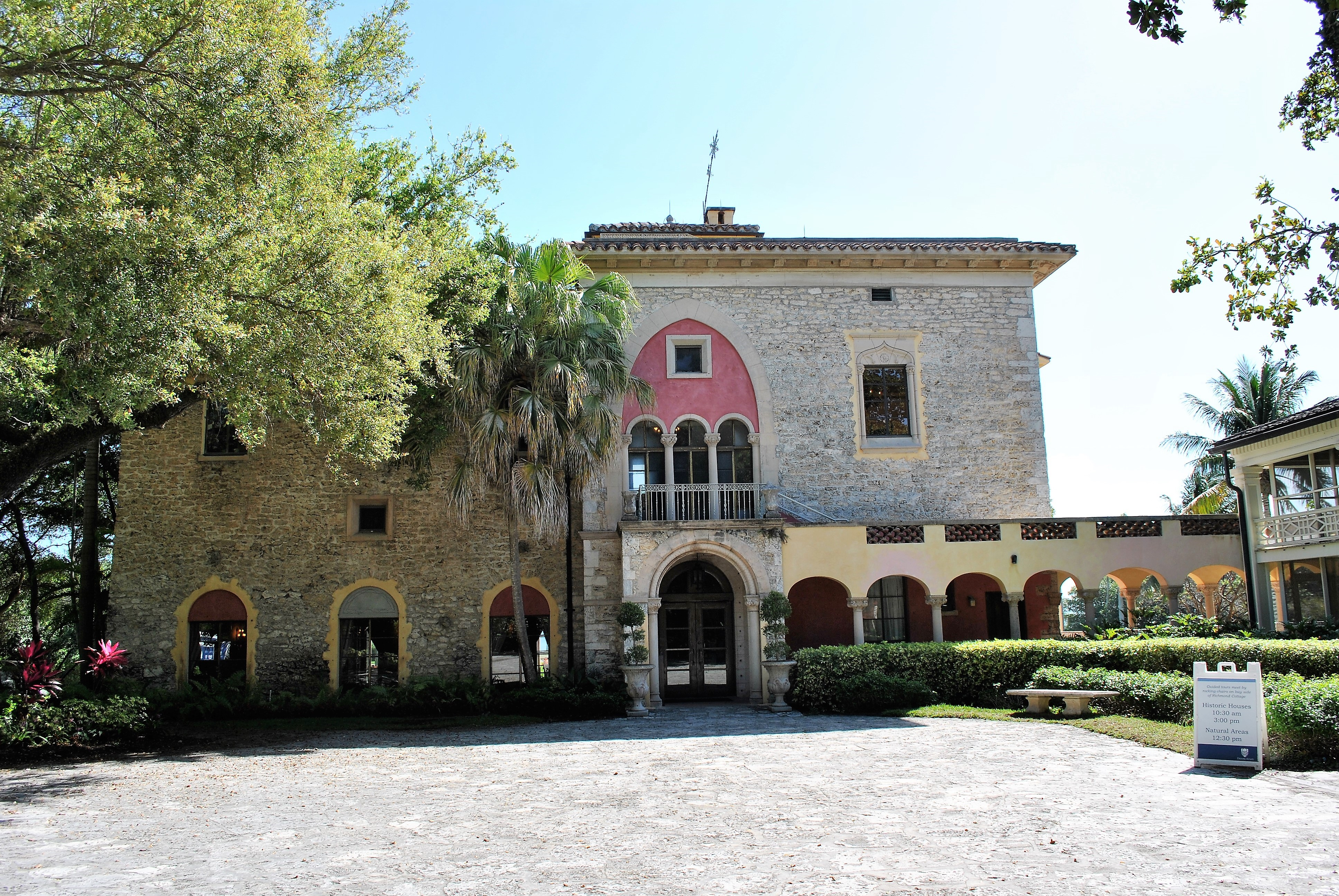
Charles Deering Estate

== See also ==
- Vizcaya Museum and Gardens
