= William H. Schuetze =

American military officer (1853–1902)

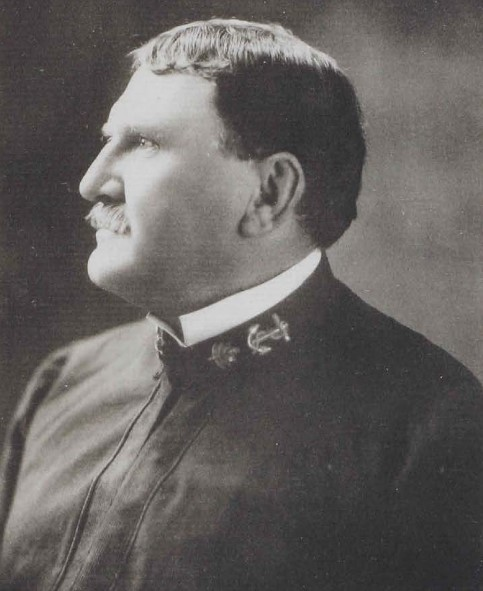
- Born: William Henry Schuetze; July 18, 1853; St. Louis, Missouri
- Died: April 4, 1902 (aged 48) Washington, D.C.
- Buried: Concordia Cemetery
- Branch: United States Navy
- Service years: 1873–1902
- Rank: Lieutenant Commander
- Known for: Jeannette expedition
- Conflicts: Spanish–American War
- Memorials: Serenity
- Alma mater: Washington University in St. Louis; United States Naval Academy

William Henry Schuetze (July 18, 1853 – April 4, 1902) was an American naval officer. He was born to German parents in St. Louis, Missouri, and attended the United States Naval Academy (USNA), graduating first in his class in 1873. While attending the USNA, he grew close to his roommate Charles Deering, and the two became lifelong friends. After graduating, Schuetze served on a number of United States Navy ships. In 1882, he and Lieutenant Giles B. Harber were ordered to search for survivors of the ill-fated Jeannette expedition. The two spent months searching the Siberian coast, but were unable to return to the U.S. until 1884, along with the bodies of ten personnel. Their rescue attempt was noted by President Chester A. Arthur in his December 1882 State of the Union address.

In 1885, President Grover Cleveland ordered Schuetze to return to Russia to deliver letters of gratitude and gifts for those who assisted in the retrieval operation. Upon returning to the U.S., he worked in the Navy Department, including the office of Assistant Secretary of the Navy William McAdoo. During the Spanish–American War, Schuetze served as navigator for the USS Iowa and took part in the bombardment of San Juan and the Battle of Santiago de Cuba. He later returned to the Navy Department and worked there until his death in 1902. Deering dedicated a sculpture, Serenity, in Schuetze's honor. The sculpture is located in Meridian Hill Park in Washington, D.C.

== Early life ==
William Henry Schuetze was born July 18, 1853 in St. Louis, Missouri. His father, John Edward Schuetze, was a physician born in Kirchbarkau, present-day Germany, who emigrated to the United States in 1832. After retiring from medical practice due to ill health, he operated a wholesale drug business and served as a consul to Scandinavian countries. His mother, Juliana Hahn Schuetze, was born in Klingenmünster and emigrated to the United States in 1829. Juliana's younger brother, Michael Hahn, later served as governor of Louisiana and a member of Congress. John and Juliana married in 1844 in New Orleans, Louisiana.

Schuetze lived in the German Confederation from the ages of five to seven, residing near Hamburg on his uncle's estate and receiving private education. After returning to St. Louis, Schuetze attended a German school followed by Washington University. With the assistance of Representative Erastus Wells, Schuetze transferred to the United States Naval Academy (USNA) in June 1869 and was appointed midshipman. At the USNA he was roommates with Charles Deering, who became a lifelong friend. During his first year at the USNA, Schuetze was second in his class. He was first in his class the following three years and promoted to senior officer the fourth year. When Schuetze graduated in 1873, he was ranked first in his class, just above Deering.

== Military career ==
After graduating, Schuetze was stationed on the USS Alaska for three months. During the following eight years, he was promoted to ensign and later master, and served on the USS Wabash, USS Franklin, USS Juniata, USS Monongahela, USS Michigan, USS Powhatan, and USS Tennessee. On February 2, 1882, Schuetze and Lieutenant Giles B. Harber were ordered to search for missing survivors and bring back remains of the deceased from the ill-fated Jeannette expedition, an attempt by the United States Navy to reach the North Pole by way of the Bering Strait. The ship sank off the northern coast of Siberia and some of the survivors were rescued in early 1882. Schuetze and Harber met in London and traveled to Paris, Saint Petersburg, Moscow, and Nizhny Novgorod, before arriving in Irkutsk where they attempted to charter a boat.

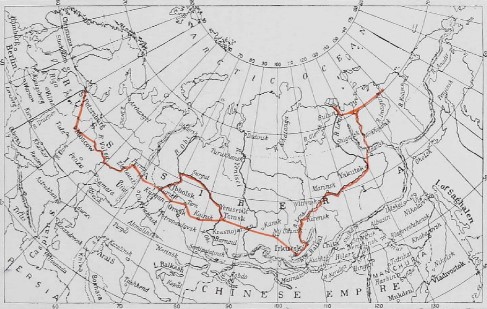
Map of the route Schuetze and Harber took during the Jeannette expedition search

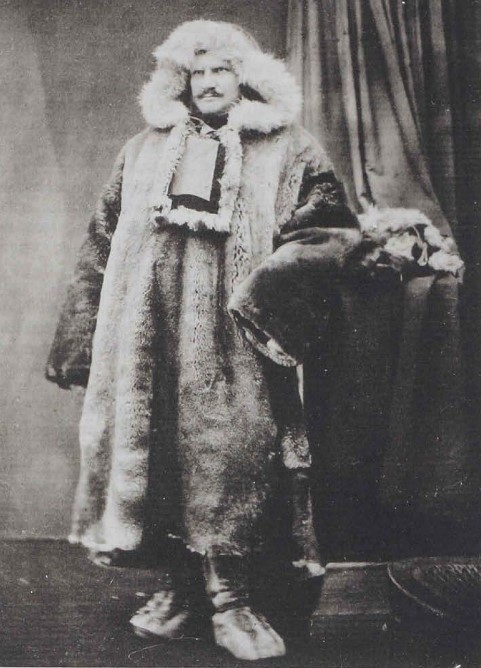
Schuetze wearing clothing from his Siberia trips

After traveling further into Russia, the two had a boat built which they sailed to Yakutsk on the Lena River. During the warmer months, they were able to sail further north to the Lena delta, searching the Siberian coast from Ust-Olenyok to the Yana delta. They were unable to find additional survivors, but did locate ten bodies of the deceased personnel in late 1882, including expedition leader George W. De Long, surgeon James Markham Ambler, and meteorologist Jerome J. Collins. The retrieval operation and the service of both Schuetze and Harber were noted in President Chester A. Arthur's December 1882 State of the Union address. Schuetze and Harber were unable to leave for the U.S. until 1883 due to weather conditions. During his time in Russia, Schuetze, who was already fluent in German and French, learned the Russian language. After numerous stops in Russia and Europe, Schuetze, Harber, and the remains of the deceased reached Hoboken, New Jersey, in February 1884.

In 1885, Schuetze was promoted to lieutenant. That same year he received orders from President Grover Cleveland to travel to Russia. He was to deliver letters of gratitude from U.S. officials to Russian officials and gifts including gold watches, medals, and swords, to Russians that had aided the Jeannette rescue operation. During his travels in Russia, he met with numerous government officials and drew maps of the Siberian region. According to friends, Schuetze experienced health issues during his two trips to Russia that had a lasting effect on his health.

He returned to the U.S. in 1886 and assigned to work in Washington, D.C., at the Bureau of Navigation as superintendent of the Compass Division. He was stationed on the USS Chicago in 1889 as part of the Squadron of Evolution and served there until 1892. Schuetze returned to the Navy Department that year to serve as Inspector of Naval Militia and was later transferred to the office of William McAdoo, the Assistant Secretary of the Navy.

Schuetze was ordered to the USS Marblehead in 1897 to serve as navigator. A few weeks before the Spanish–American War began, he applied to serve as navigator of the USS Iowa, under the command of his friend, Rear Admiral Robley D. Evans. During his time on the Iowa, Schuetze took part in the blockade of Havana and Santiago de Cuba, the bombardment of San Juan, and the Battle of Santiago de Cuba. After the war, Schuetze was called as a witness in the Sampson–Schley controversy, a court of inquiry dispute between Rear Admirals William T. Sampson and Winfield Scott Schley over who deserved credit for the Battle of Santiago de Cuba success. In 1899, Schuetze was promoted to lieutenant commander and, at his request, stationed on the USS Philadelphia as it patrolled the Pacific Ocean. He returned to the Navy Department in 1901 and resumed his role as superintendent of the Compass Division.

== Death and memorial ==
Schuetze died at the Old Naval Hospital in Washington, D.C., on April 4, 1902, from stomach and lung issues. Three days later his funeral took place at St. John's Episcopal Church, Lafayette Square. Among those in attendance were Navy Secretary John Davis Long and McAdoo. The honorary pallbearers were Admiral Thomas B. Howard, Rear Admirals Cameron Winslow, Vincendon L. Cottman, and Reginald F. Nicholson, Commodore Edmund Beardsley Underwood, Major General Wallace F. Randolph, Colonel George C. Reed, and Lieutenant Commander Charles Laird. The United States Marine Band and four companies from the Marine Barracks were the military escorts from the church to the Baltimore and Ohio Railroad Station, where his body was then taken to St. Louis, accompanied by Deering. After another funeral ceremony took place with his family in St. Louis, Schuetze was buried in Concordia Cemetery.

In 1915, Deering commissioned a sculpture from his friend, Spanish-Catalan artist José Clarà. When the sculpture was finally completed in 1921, instead of installing it at his residence in Spain, Deering donated it to the American people in remembrance of Schuetze. In July 1925, the sculpture, Serenity, was installed in Meridian Hill Park, an urban park in Washington, D.C. The inscription on the sculpture's base reads: SERENITY/IN REMEMBRANCE OF WILLIAM HENRY SCHEUTZE/LIEUTENANT COMMANDER UNITED STATES NAVY/MDCCCLIII-MCMII. Schuetze's last name is misspelled. The sculpture has been repeatedly damaged throughout its history and has been called the "most vandalized memorial" in Washington, D.C.
