= Giles B. Harber =

United States Navy admiral (1849–1925)

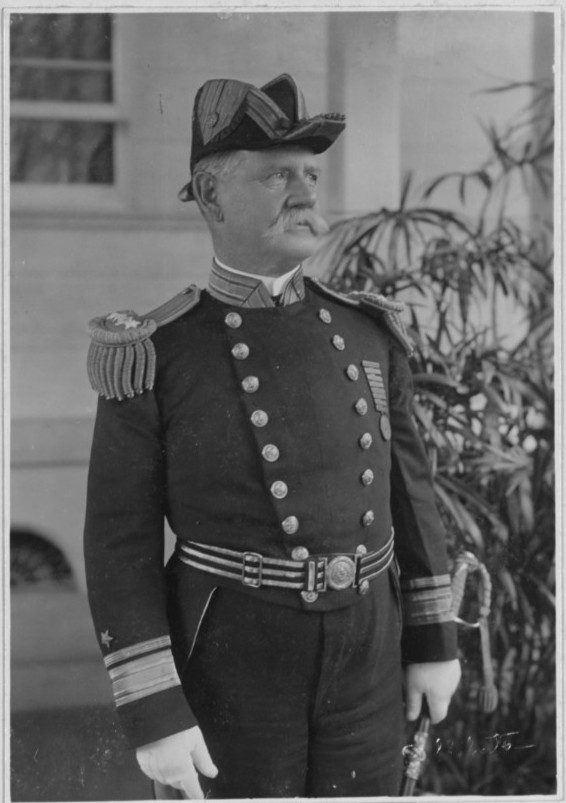
- Born: September 24, 1849; Youngstown, Ohio, U.S.
- Died: December 29, 1925 (aged 76); Youngstown, Ohio, U.S.
- Military career
- Allegiance: United States of America
- Branch: United States Navy
- Service years: 1869–1911
- Rank: Rear Admiral
- Commands: U.S. Pacific Fleet; 3rd Squadron, Pacific Fleet; Mare Island Navy Yard; USS Independence; USS New Orleans; USCSS Hassler; USS Alarm
- Conflicts: Spanish–American War

Giles Bates Harber (September 24, 1849 – December 29, 1925) was a rear admiral of the United States Navy and one-time Commander-in-Chief of the United States Pacific Fleet. He was born and died in Youngstown, Ohio. Harber, called a "Naval Hero" by The New York Times, was best known as for leading the rescue expedition for the USS Jeannette off of Siberia and the return of the body of her captain. He was also decorated by Congress for his role in the Spanish–American War.

== Biography ==
Born and raised in Youngstown, Ohio, Harber personally asked U.S. Congressman James A. Garfield for an appointment to the United States Naval Academy. He became an acting midshipman on July 22, 1865 and a passed midshipman on June 4, 1869. Though still only nineteen years old, Harber graduated ninth out of 74 in his class.

After graduation, Harber was assigned to the sailing frigate USS Sabine. He was commissioned as an ensign on July 12, 1870. From 1870 to 1871, Harber served aboard the screw frigate USS Franklin in the European Squadron. He was promoted to master in July 1871 and lieutenant in September 1874. From 1881 to 1882, Harber commanded the torpedo boat USS Alarm. In February 1882, he began travelling with Lt. William H. Schuetze from London to Paris to St. Petersburg and then on to Irkutsk, where he chartered a steamer in April 1882 to search for the missing crew of the USS Jeannette.

From 1889 to 1892, Harber was assigned to the U.S. Naval Academy staff. From 1892 and 1895, he commanded the U.S. coastal survey steamer Hassler in Alaskan waters. Harber was promoted to lieutenant commander in September 1896. He served as the executive officer of the battleship USS Texas during the Spanish–American War. Harber was promoted to commander in September 1899. He was assigned as naval attaché in both Paris and St. Petersburg from 1900 to 1903.

Harber subsequently served with the Asiatic Squadron near China, commanding the protected cruiser USS New Orleans from October 1903 to February 1905. He was promoted to captain in September 1904. Harber graduated from the Naval War College in 1905. He then commanded the USS Independence and the Mare Island Navy Yard from 1905 to 1907.

From 1907 to 1910, Harber commanded the 3rd Squadron, Pacific Fleet. He was promoted to rear admiral in November 1908. From February to November 1910, Harber commanded the Pacific Fleet. He then became president of the Naval Examining and Retiring Boards in Washington, D.C. Harber retired from active duty on September 24, 1911, having reached the mandatory retirement age of 62.

== Personal ==
Harber was the son of Joseph Harber and Ann Eliza (Darrow) Harber.

Harber married Jeannette Thruston Manning (February 10, 1852 – September 14, 1925) on April 25, 1889. She was the great granddaughter of Judge Buckner Thruston. The couple had no children.

After his retirement, Harber and his wife lived in Washington, D.C. After his wife's death, he moved back to Youngstown, Ohio. Harber and his wife are buried at Arlington National Cemetery.

Military offices
Preceded by Uriel Sebree	Commander in Chief of the United States Pacific Fleet; February 19, 1910 – November 1, 1910	Succeeded by Edward B. Barry
