= Serenity (Clara) =

Sculpture by Josep Clarà

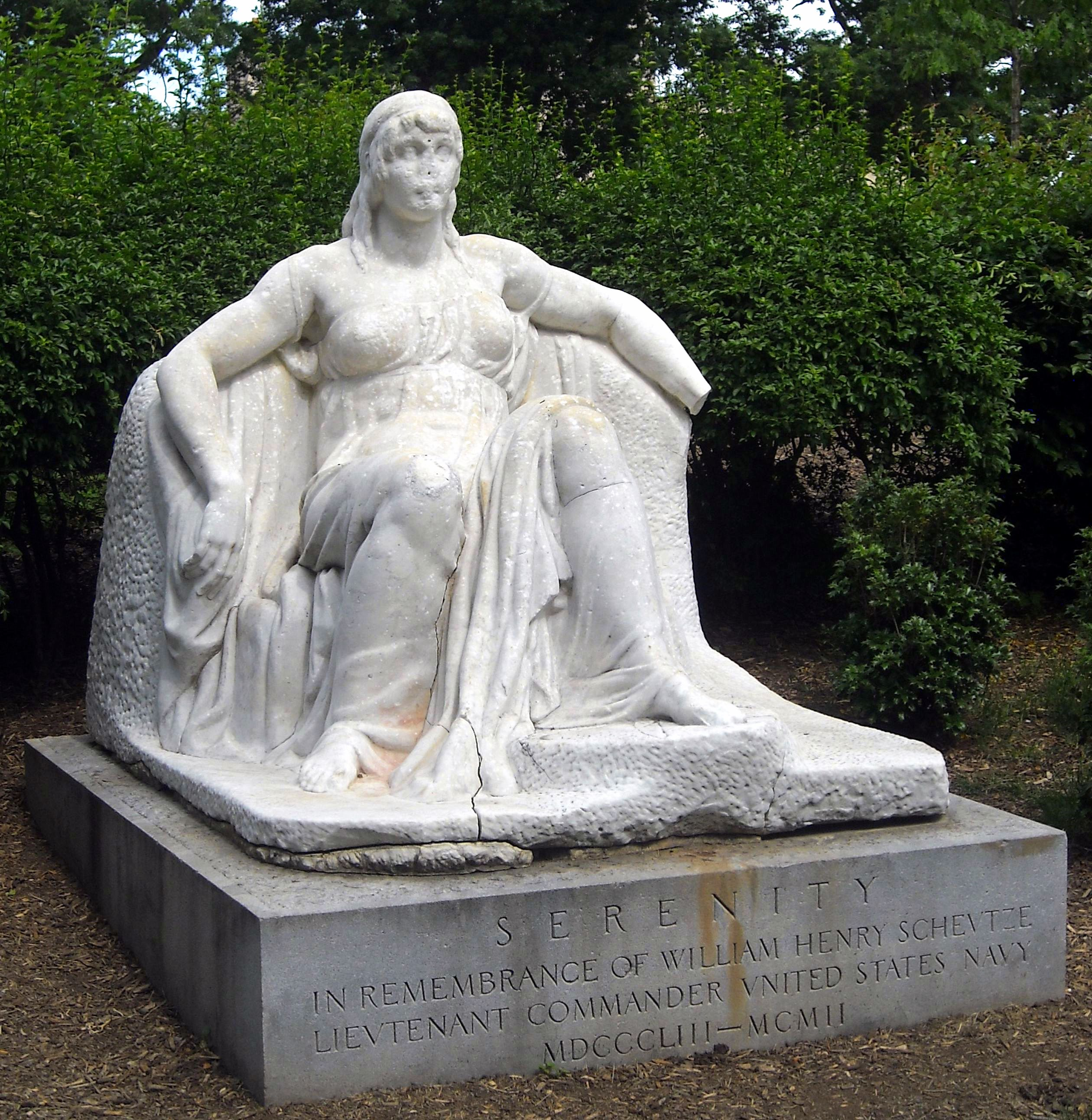
- Serenity in 2008
- Artist: Josep Clarà
- Year: 1925
- Type: Carrara marble (sculpture); Granite (base)
- Dimensions: 2.05 m × 1.64 m (6.7 ft × 5.4 ft)
- Location: Meridian Hill Park, Washington, D.C., U.S.; 38°55′19″N 77°2′10″W
- Owner: National Park Service

Serenity is a public artwork in Meridian Hill Park, an urban park in Washington, D.C. It was sculpted by Spanish-Catalan artist Josep Clarà, who created an identical version on display in Barcelona. The sculpture was commissioned by Charles Deering, an American businessman and art collector, who was friends with Clarà. The sculpture was completed in 1921 and Deering dedicated it to his lifelong friend, Lieutenant Commander William H. Schuetze, who died in 1902. Deering gifted it to the United States and it was installed in 1925. The Carrara marble sculpture rests on a granite base and depicts a woman sitting on a rocky ledge. Soon after it was installed, there were protests about its artistic value and it was vandalized. For almost a century, Serenity has been repeatedly damaged, with its nose, hand, and other pieces missing. It has been called the "most vandalized memorial" in Washington, D.C.

== Description ==
The sculpture is of an allegorical woman wearing long, flowing classical robes which are tied at her waist. She has long hair and stares intensely in front of her. The woman sits on a rocky ledge with her arms casually resting on the rocks behind her. Her left foot rested on a broken sword. The Carrera marble sculpture is 6 feet 7 inches (2.01 m) tall and 5 feet 4 inches (1.63 m) wide. It rests on a granite base measuring 1 foot 8.3 inches (0.516 m) tall and 8 feet 2.5 inches (2.502 m) wide.

The sculpture is signed on the proper left side: "Jose Clara". The front of the base is inscribed:

SERENITY
IN REMEMBRANCE OF WILLIAM HENRY SCHEVTZE
LIEVTENANT COMMANDER VNITED STATES NAVY
MDCCCLIII–MCMII

The name of William Henry Schuetze on the base is misspelled. Due to vandalism, the sculpture is missing the nose and one hand. The sculpture is located along a walkway in the northwest portion of Meridian Hill Park, an urban park in Washington, D.C., and is partially obscured by trees. Serenity is owned and maintained by the National Park Service (NPS), an agency of the United States Department of the Interior. It is one of several artworks in the park; other artworks include the Joan of Arc equestrian statue, the Dante Alighieri statue, the James Buchanan Memorial, and the Noyes Armillary Sphere.

== History ==
=== Background ===
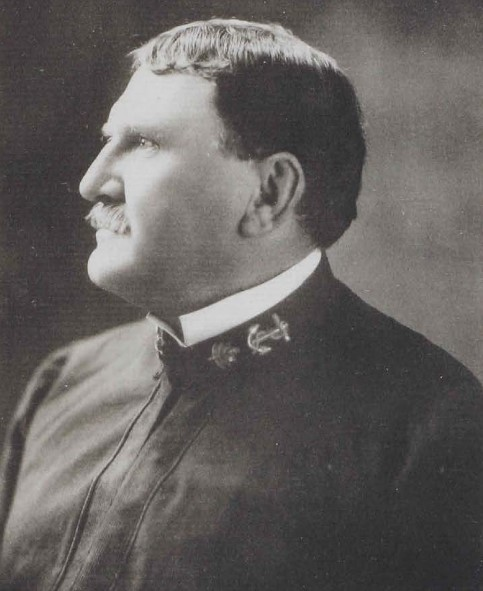
The sculpture is dedicated to military officer William H. Schuetze (1853–1902).

Charles Deering, an American businessman, philanthropist, and art collector, built a house in Sitges, Spain, in 1917. Among the many artists whose works were displayed on the property, now housing the Palau de Maricel museum, was Josep Clarà, a prominent Spanish-Catalan sculptor whom Deering befriended. According to art historian Kineton Parkes, Clarà "absorbed all modern ideas on sculpture, and amalgamated them with those of the grandeur of classical work, and the work of the Renaissance. Phidias and Michealangelo are his teachers, as well as Rodin." In 1915, Deering commissioned Clarà to create a sculpture for his home in Sitges. The piece, titled Serenity, was not completed until 1921, at which time there was no longer space for it.

Deering dedicated the sculpture to his longtime friend, Lieutenant Commander William Henry Schuetze, who had died in Washington, D.C., in 1902. Schuetze and Deering attended the United States Naval Academy where they were roommates and became lifelong friends. Schuetze graduated first in his class in 1873. One of his early assignments in the United States Navy was the retrieval of bodies from the ill-fated Jeannette expedition. He later served in the White Squadron and as a navigator on the USS Iowa during the Spanish–American War. After his death, Captain Samuel C. Lemly, Judge Advocate General of the Navy, said "No words of praise are too strong for this gallant officer." His funeral took place at St. John's Episcopal Church, Lafayette Square.

=== Installation ===
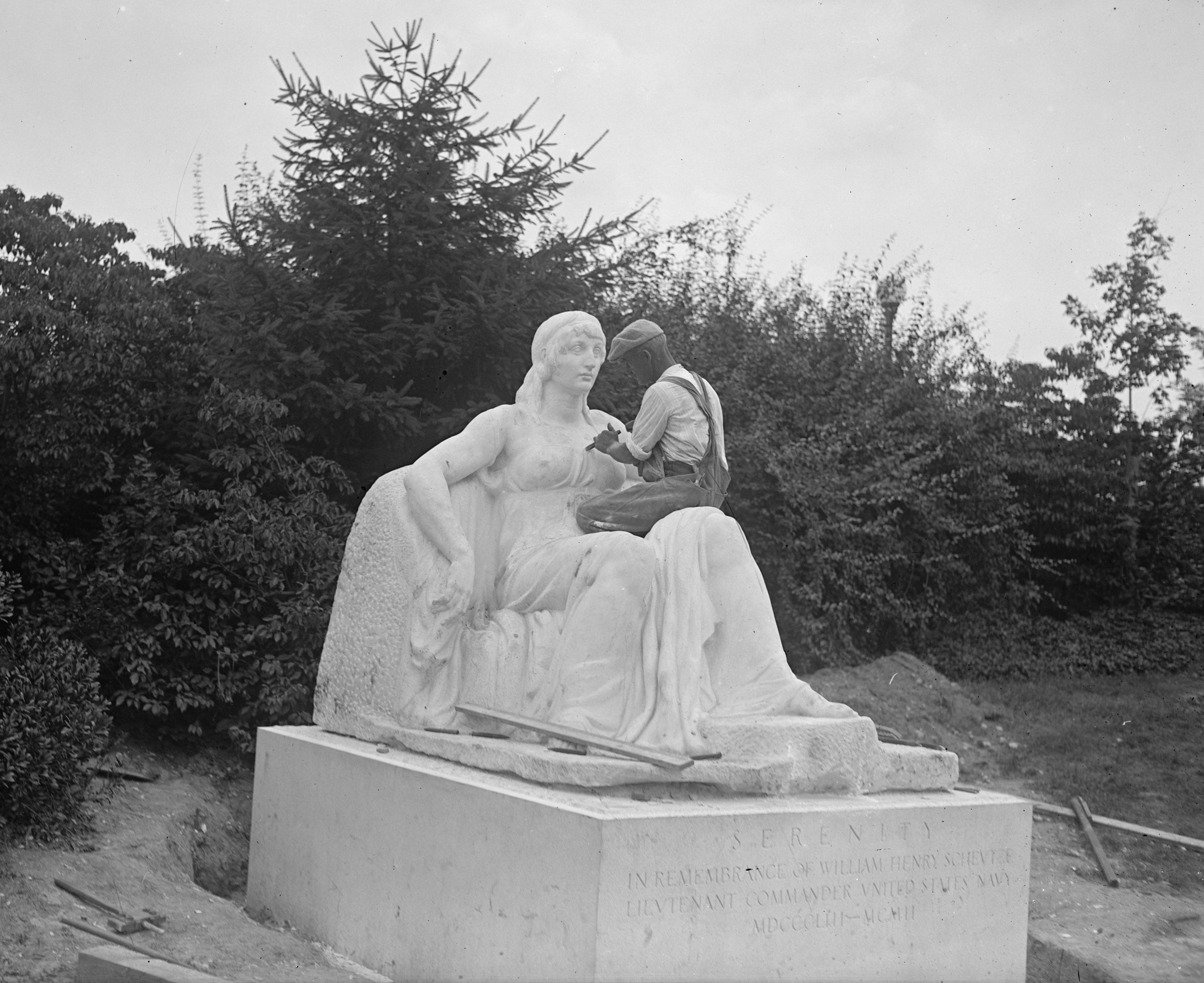
Installation of the sculpture in 1925

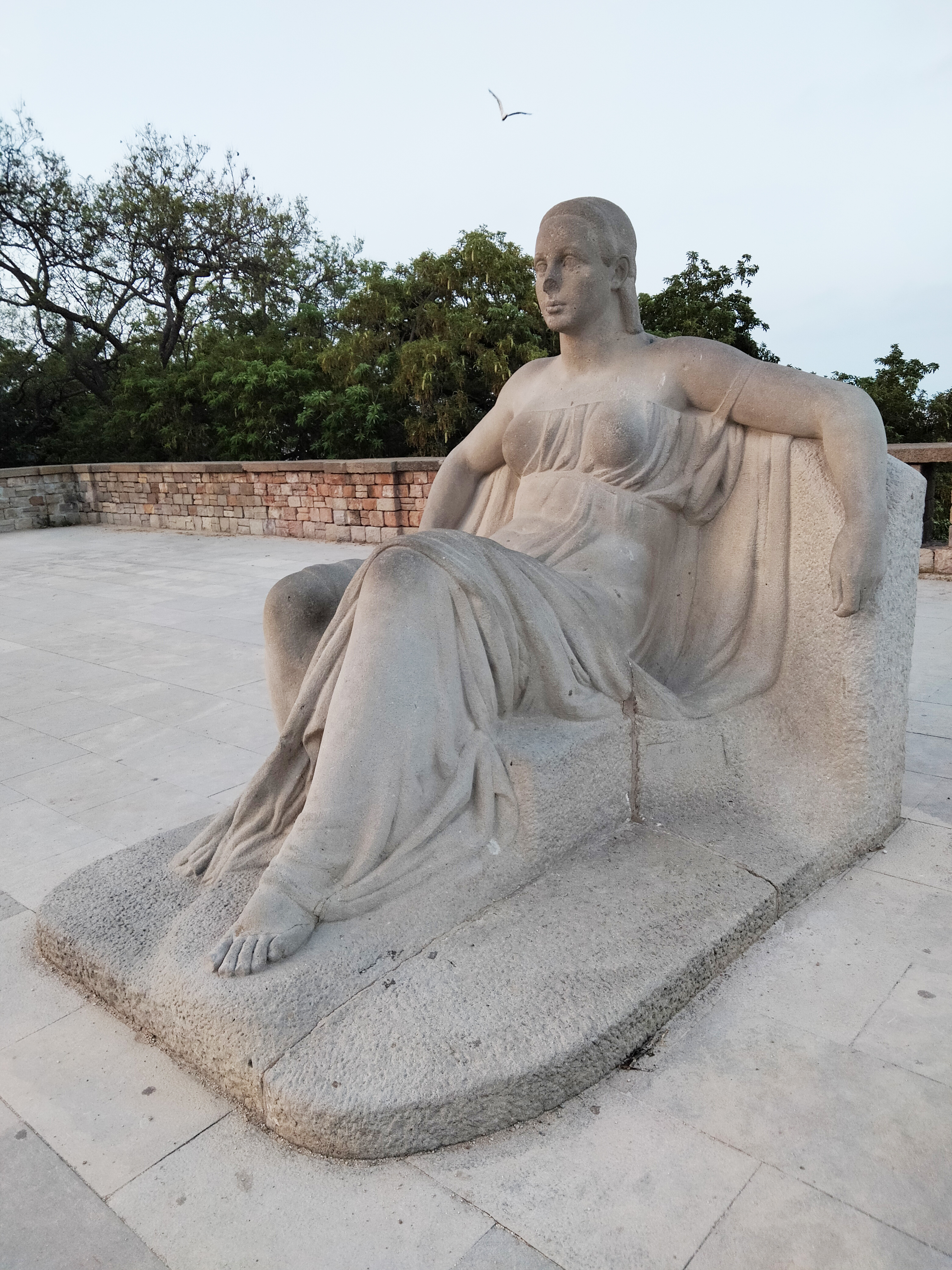
Serenitat, Serenity's Barcelona sibling, remains mostly undamaged.

Deering presented the sculpture as a gift to the United States for it to be installed on public land in Washington, D.C. On March 12, 1924, the United States Congress accepted the sculpture on behalf of the American people and directed the United States Army Corps of Engineers to select a site for it to be installed. The United States Commission of Fine Arts (CFA) selected a site in Meridian Hill Park. The sculpture was placed in a storage facility of the Office of Public Buildings and Grounds until it was ready to be moved to a permanent location. The foundation was built in March 1925 and the base installed three months later. The project was completed in July 1925 at a cost of $4,500, paid for by Deering. It is one of the few outdoor statues in Washington, D.C., to never receive a dedication ceremony. A very similar sculpture, titled Serenitat, was made by Clarà in 1929. It is on display in the Miramar Gardens in Barcelona, Spain.

=== Protests and vandalism ===
Soon after it was installed, there was criticism of the sculpture's artistic value by some members of the public. Rear Admiral William Wirt Kimball sent a protest letter to the CFA chairman. The first recorded act of vandalism in Meridian Hill Park took place when hammers were used to leave marks on Serenity. In April 1926, someone put paint on the figure's hair and cheeks, ink was splashed on it, and she was partially draped with a piece of cloth. In 1932, someone applied makeup to the figure. It was during this time a local neighborhood group, the Columbia Heights Citizens' Association (CHCA), requested Serenity be covered or removed. The occasional application of makeup continued and park officials would have the sculpture cleaned. The CHCA continued its quest to have it removed, taking their complaints to Lieutenant Commander Ulysses S. Grant III, who was serving as director of the Office of Public Buildings and Public Parks of the National Capital at the time. Grant informed the CHCA that since Serenity was accepted through an Act of Congress, he had no authority to remove it. Grant did note his distaste for Serenity, calling it an "entirely unattractive statue". The CHCA appealed to the Federation of Citizens Associations of the District of Columbia, which deferred on the matter.

In the 1950s, the NPS noted Serenity was the "chief headache" in the annual monument cleaning program. Instead of yearly maintenance, the sculpture had to be cleaned more often because of makeup and pencil marks being left on the figure. A 1957 article in The Evening Star described the condition of Serenity: "Its nose has been chipped off. Its marble lips have been daubed with lipstick and mud. Fingers on its right hand have been broken off. In its lap lie shards of broken glass from discarded whiskey bottles. Its surface is pocketed from a thousand missiles." In 1960, a congressional report noted the artworks in Meridian Hill Park had to be cleaned every two weeks to remove makeup and other vandalism. The nose, fingers, and toes on Serenity were replaced, costing $500.

The sculpture's nose and missing teeth were replaced in the 1990s, but by 1998, vandals had removed them. In 2001, the NPS considered placing Serenity in storage until it could be repaired, but due to its fragile, damaged state, doing so could result in its destruction. Several years later, John Kelly of The Washington Post said Serenity resembled a "weathered sculpture from antiquity". In 2013, black paint was splashed onto the sculpture and red paint was used to create a smile similar to the one depicted on comic book villain the Joker. It was removed shortly after by the NPS. Due to its history of repeated damage, Serenity has been described as the "most vandalized memorial" in Washington, D.C.

== See also ==
- List of public art in Washington, D.C., Ward 1
