= Old Cutler Road =

Road in Miami-Dade County, Florida

Coordinates: 25.5932967°N 80.3200195°W

- Ingraham Highway
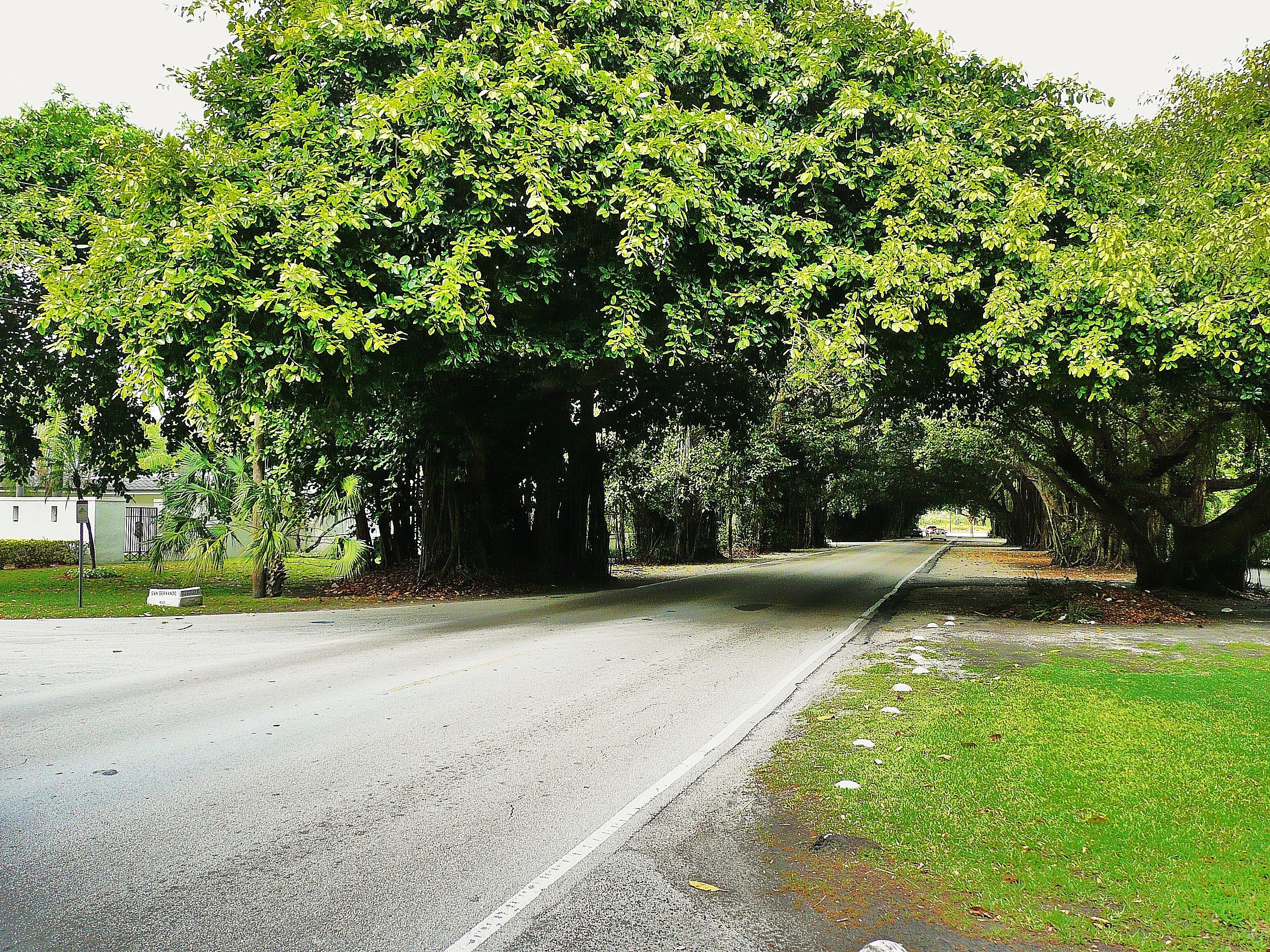
- Old Cutler Road as it passes through a tree tunnel in Coral Gables
- Length: 14.9 mi (24.0 km)
- Location: Miami-Dade County, Florida, United States
- Southwest end: US 1 in Goulds
- Northeast end: Sunset Drive and LeJeune Road at Cocoplum Circle in Coral Gables

Construction
- Inauguration: 1895

Old Cutler Road is an off-grid plan, 14.9-mile (24.0 km) main northeast–southwest road running south of downtown Miami in Miami-Dade County, Florida, United States.

== Route description ==
The northern terminus is Cocoplum Circle at the edge of the Coral Gables Waterway in the city of Coral Gables. It connects at the circle with LeJeune Road, Sunset Drive, Ingraham Highway and Cocoplum Road.

From this point south it goes through Coral Gables until it intersects with Red Road (West 57th Avenue). It then shares its name with Red Road, going due south for a short distance dividing the city of Coral Gables to the east with the village of Pinecrest to the west. It fully enters the village of Pinecrest upon crossing South 128th Street (Lugo Avenue).

It continues southwest through Pinecrest until it curves due west and shares its name with South 136th Street dividing the village of Pinecrest to the north with the village of Palmetto Bay to the south for a short distance until it crosses West 67th Avenue (Ludlam Road) where it veers southwest and separates from South 136th Street as only Old Cutler Road again.

It continues south-southwest through Palmetto Bay until it crosses South 184th Street and enters the town of Cutler Bay. It continues southwest through Cutler Bay until it crosses South 216th Street (Hainlin Mill Drive) where it divides the town of Cutler Bay to the east with unincorporated Miami-Dade County to the west, until it crosses Southwest 224th Street where it fully enters unincorporated Miami-Dade County and curves due west.

It continues west as Old Cutler Road until it crosses under the Homestead Extension of Florida's Turnpike without an interchange and becomes West Old Cutler Road. It continues west-northwest as West Old Cutler Road until it crosses West 112th Avenue and shares its name with South 220th Street. South 220th Street is no longer called West Old Cutler Road west of US 1.

== History ==
The origins of this coastal route predates the building of roads in Dade County, as a trail along the high ridge of South Florida's coastline, often referred to by pioneer settlers as "The Reef."

From the state historical marker placed on the road: "Old Cutler Road owes its name to the former town of Cutler, a farming community founded by William Fuzzard in the late 1800s. The town was named after Dr. William Cutler of Massachusetts who visited the area about 1880 and encouraged Fuzzard and others to settle here. In 1883, Fuzzard, with the help of other residents of Cutler, cut a path north and east through a wilderness of pine rocklands and hardwood hammocks to the Village of Coconut Grove. The road followed a natural limestone ridge along Biscayne Bay, and established the first overland route connecting Coconut Grove and Cutler. It was subsequently widened to a wagon trail, and was declared a public road in 1895. The road became known as Cutler Road, later as Ingraham Highway, and still later as Old Cutler Road. Today, Old Cutler Road, which follows a somewhat altered course, maintains the appearance and atmosphere of a country road, and provides a tangible reminder of the heritage of the Miami area. Old Cutler Road was declared a State Historic Highway in 1974 by the Florida Legislature."

Progress on paving the route was greatly improved by installing a concrete bridge over Snapper Creek in 1916. Soon, the road reached all the way to Paradise Key and Royal Palm State Park, a magnificent natural area featuring the largest stand of Royal Palms in North America, later part of Everglades National Park.

In 1916, members of the Miami Woman's Club successfully petitioned the Dade County Commission to name the road in honor of James Ingraham, brought in by Mr. Flagler as his Land Commissioner to manage FEC land holdings, buying, selling and attaining them as grants. Eventually, the FEC Land Department became the Model Land Company and Mr. Ingraham was given the title of “3rd Vice President,” in charge of that company.

The completion of Ingraham Highway to the Everglades was instrumental in the establishment of Florida's first state park: Royal Palm State Park, owned by the General Federation of Woman's Clubs.

Several prominent land owners were successful in diverting the original highway around their properties. Just south of Snapper Creek, the road once ran through the Montgomery Estate (now Montgomery Botanical Center), right past the main house, proceeding through what is now the Gulliver School property.

Further south, the road ran through Chapman Field USDA Subtropical Horticulture Research Station, and further, through the Charles Deering Estate, past the historic Richmond Cottage early settlement on Biscayne Bay.

From the History of Chapman Field: "Within the USDA Station at Chapman field, an access road west of and parallel to 60th Avenue is a remnant of the old Ingraham Highway, which was relocated about three quarters of a mile to the west as the base was constructed. Ingraham Highway would eventually be renamed Old Cutler Road."

Deering successfully petitioned the Dade County Commission to allow him to divert the road around his estate in exchange for building a public dock at the south end of his property which would allow local farmers and the general public direct access to Biscayne Bay.

Remnants of the old road still run through these properties, and some portions of the original route, notably in Coconut Grove and near the entrance to Everglades National Park, still carry the name Ingraham Highway.
