= Chapman Field (Miami) =

Plant research facility for the US Agricultural Research Service

- Interactive map of Chapman Field
- Coordinates: 25°38′30.05″N 80°17′42.45″W
- Area: 197 acres (80 ha)
- Opened: 1898
- Founder: David Fairchild
- Owner: United States Department of Agriculture (USDA)
- Collections: rubber, cacao, coffee, mango, palm, avocado
- Website: Subtropical Horticulture Research Station

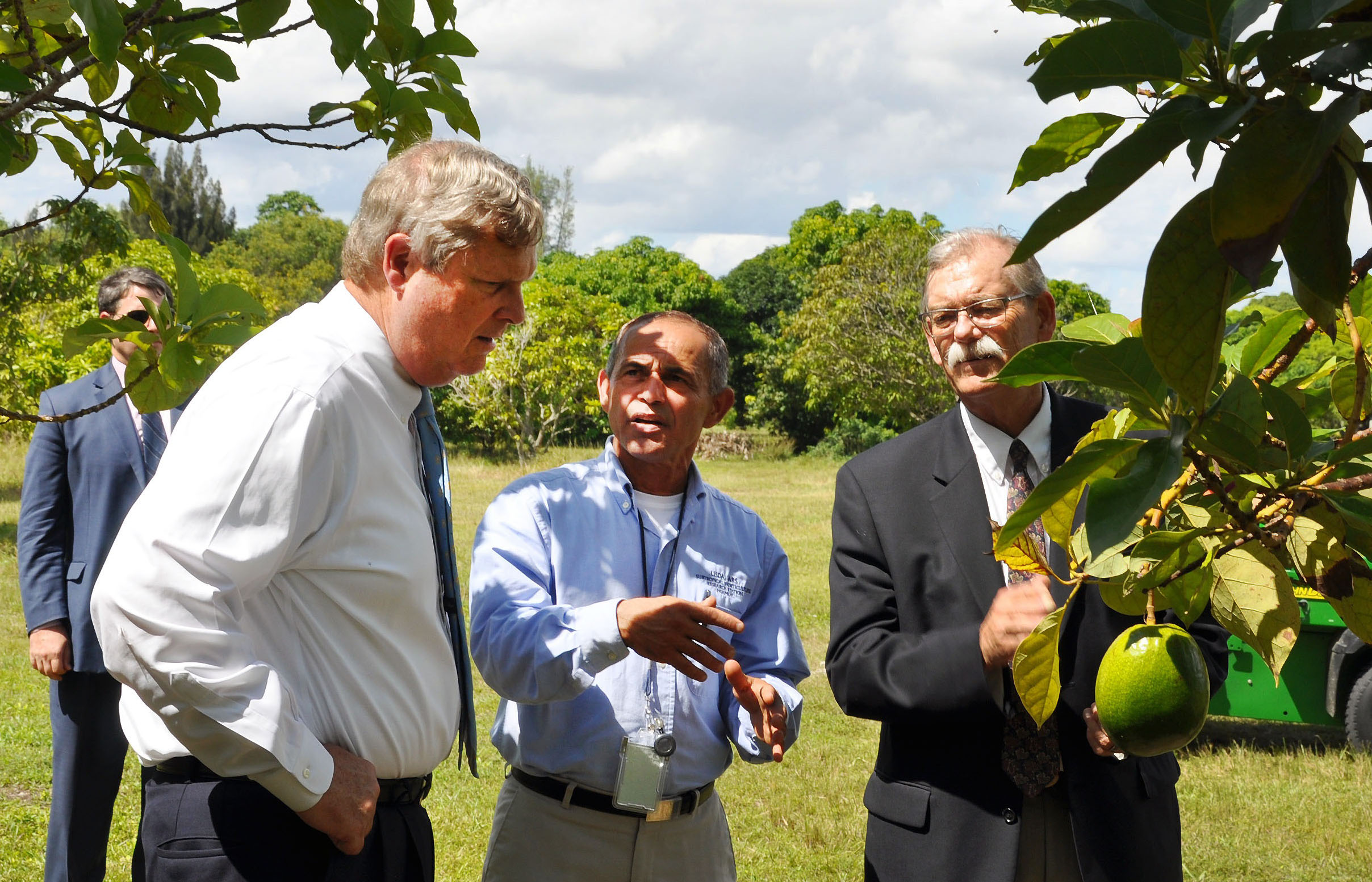
Agriculture Secretary Tom Vilsack, Dr. Tomas Silva-Ayalaand, and Dr. Peter Teal tour the U.S. Department of Agriculture's (USDA) Agricultural Research Service (ARS) Subtropical Horticulture Research Station

Chapman Field (officially the Subtropical Horticulture Research Station) is a horticulture and agronomy research facility of the Agricultural Research Service, a division of the United States Department of Agriculture (USDA), located in Miami, Florida. Dating from 1898, it is one of the oldest entities in South Florida. The USDA also refers to it as the Miami Station.

The introduction of economically useful plants into the US is a three-step process: (1) explorers find the plants in foreign countries; (2) the plants are sent back to a USDA introduction garden where they are evaluated; (3) successful plants are distributed to farmers and nurserymen. Chapman Field is the original introduction garden for tropical plants.

Over 20,000 plant introductions have been registered at the Miami station since its establishment. Emphasis has been on rubber, cacao, coffee, mango, palm, avocado, lychee, and other plants.

== History ==
=== Brickell Avenue ===
The Miami station was started as a plant introduction garden in what is now downtown Miami on six acres near Brickell Avenue in 1898. The six acres were provided to the USDA by Mary Brickell. There was an additional acre and $1000 provided by Henry Flagler. This was a temporary donation. The USDA did not take title to the land. The garden was begun by David Fairchild, the USDA's newly hired manager of the Section of Seed and Plant Introduction. It was the first Plant Introduction Garden of the United States Government. Herbert J. Webber was the first man in charge of the garden. It cost the government $3000 per year. Fairchild's next visit from Washington was in February 1912 when Ed Simmonds was the Superintendent in Charge. It was during this visit that Fairchild had his only meeting with Flagler.

=== Buena Vista ===
In 1914 it was felt that the Brickell Avenue site was too small. After considering donations from various developers, the USDA accepted the donation of 25 acres from Charles Deering at his estate in Buena Vista. This was located seven miles to the north between NE 21st and 30th Streets on N. Miami Avenue. This land was then used in addition to the Brickell Avenue property. They were referred to as the big garden and the little garden. Fairchild was in town the day of the great freeze of February 3, 1917. The temperature recorded in the little garden was 26.5 F.

=== Chapman Field ===
In 1920 Fairchild was visiting Miami and realized that the land boom in progress was crowding out the two gardens. He heard that there was an Army air corps training field called Chapman Field that was being declared surplus. He and his chief explorer, Wilson Popenoe, met with John Weeks, Secretary of War, who approved of the transfer to the USDA. Fairchild thought he was getting the entire 800 acres but some citizens of Miami who were as air-minded as he was plant-minded chiseled away all but 95 acres which was secured permanently by an agreement bearing President Coolidge's signature. Over time the station gained an additional 65 acres and finally in 1947 another 37 acres for the current total of 197 acres. Starting in 1923 plant material was transferred from the two original gardens to Chapman Field. After the 1926 hurricane severely damaged the original gardens, they were returned to their donors. Ev Sewell assisted in getting the Aero Gunners' School for the Army located at Chapman Field. This base cost the government nearly a million dollars. The field was named after Victor Chapman, the first American flyer to die in France during the First World War. On the land not used by the USDA the government maintained an airfield used by army reservists for bombing practice. During the Second World War the field was outsourced to Embry-Riddle to train pilots. Chapman Field was also the location of Coastal Patrol Base #7 of the Civil Air Patrol during 1942–1943.

Chapman Field is located in southern Miami-Dade county. Its 197 acres are bounded by Howard Drive (SW 136 ST), Ludlam Road (SW 67 AVE), SW 144 ST, and Deering Bay DR.

== Current Work ==
A Market Quality research component was added to the Subtropical Horticulture Research Station (SHRS) in 1956 to maintain consistently high quality fruit on the grocery store shelves. Greater awareness of tropical fruits led to increased imports and a corresponding higher risk of pests being imported. In response to this, in 1968 a Commodity Treatment research group was added to the SHRS to develop quarantine treatments to ensure that pests are imported. With the formation of the National Plant Germplasm System (NPGS) in 1980, the mission was modified from plant introduction to conservation of valuable genetic stocks known as germplasm. The National Germplasm Repository located on the Subtropical Horticulture Research Station is one of seventeen repositories in the NPGS.
