= Latitude on the River =

American skyscraper

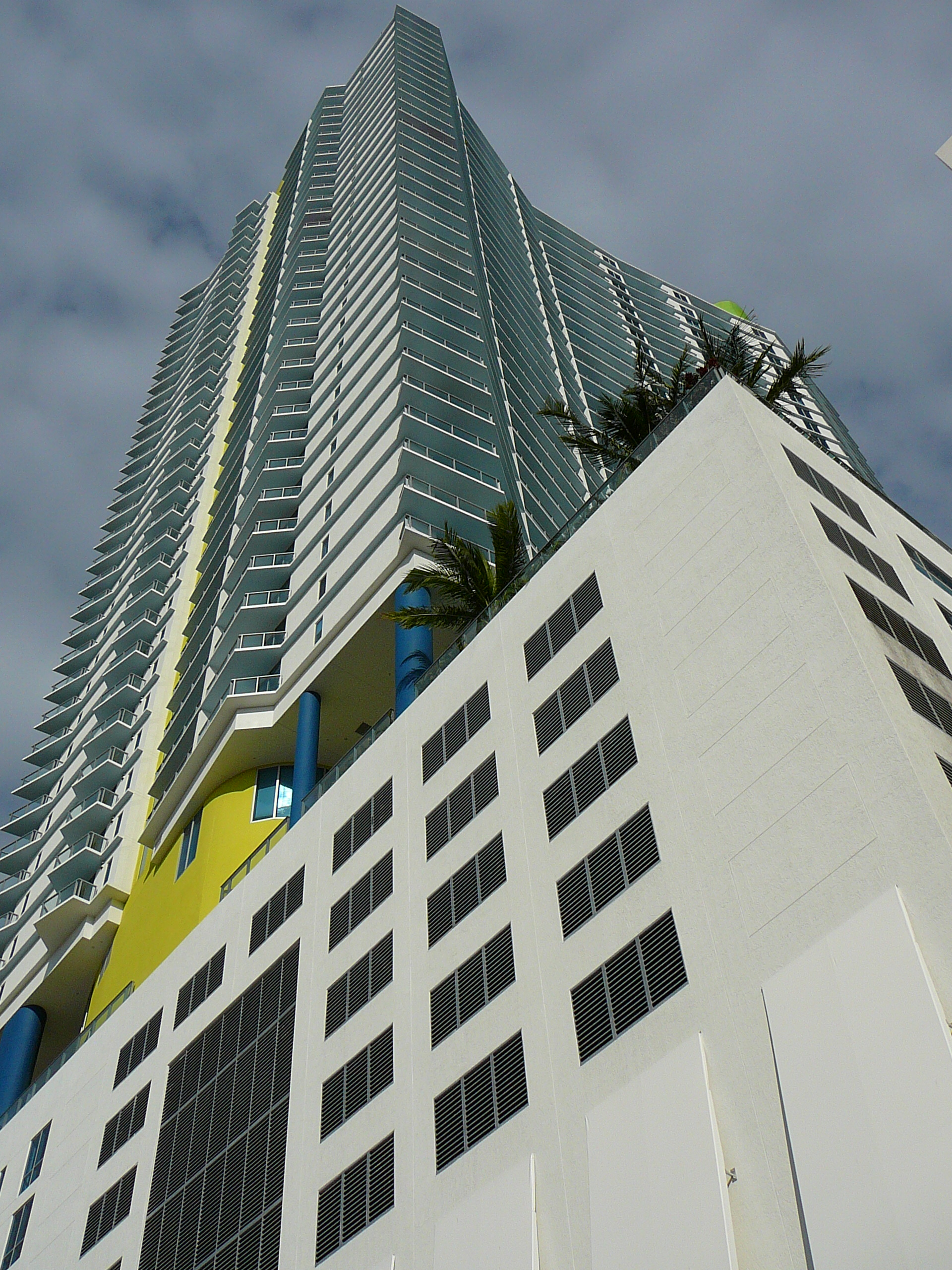
- Latitude on the River main tower as seen from SW 2nd Avenue in December 2007
- Interactive map of the Latitude on the River area

General information
- Type: Residential and office
- Location: 185 SW 7th St 12th floor, Miami, Florida, United States
- Coordinates: 25.768192°N 80.197116°W
- Construction started: 2004
- Completed: 2007
- Opening: 2007

Height
- Roof: 476 ft (145 m)

Technical details
- Floor count: 44

Design and construction
- Architect: Arquitectonica

NeoVertika
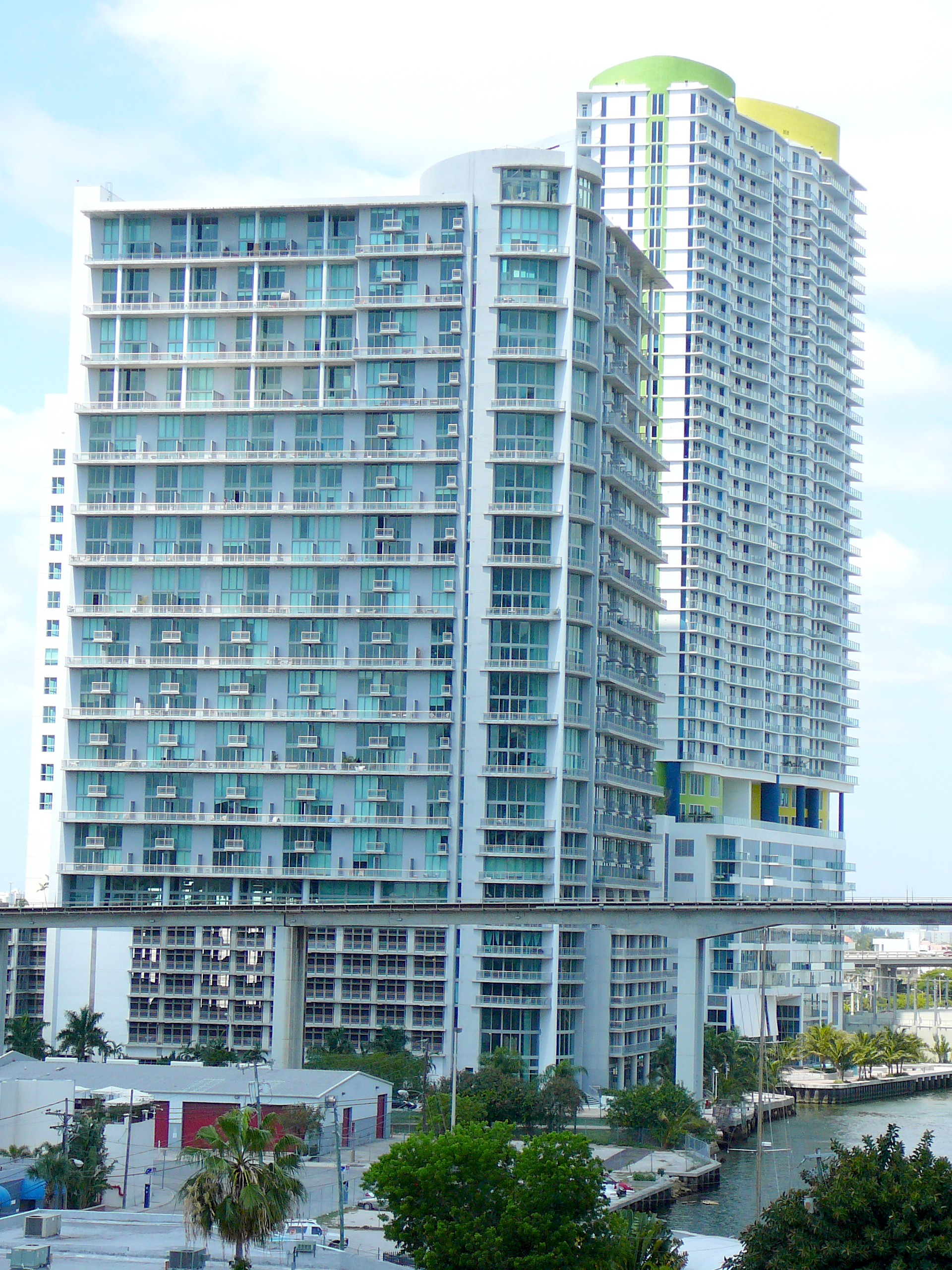
- Latitude One in front of Latitude on the River main tower, May 2008
- Interactive map of the NeoVertika area

General information
- Type: Office
- Location: 185 SW 7th St, Miami, Florida, United States
- Construction started: 2004
- Completed: 2007
- Opening: 2007

Height
- Roof: 93 m (305 ft)

Technical details
- Floor count: 23

Design and construction
- Architect: Arquitectonica

Latitude on the River is a complex of residential and office towers in Downtown Miami, Florida, United States. The complex consists of the 44-story north tower (476 ft / 145 m) Latitude on the River and the 35-storey, 113 meter south tower NeoVertika (both completed in 2007), as well as the 93-metre (305 ft) office building Latitude One.

The complex is located on the southern banks of the Miami River in downtown. The building was one of the three Miami Riverfront luxury condominiums that sued manufacturers for Faulty Fire Sprinkler Systems.

== See also ==
- List of tallest buildings in Miami
