= One Broadway =

One Broadway or 1 Broadway may refer to the following:

- One Broadway (Miami)
- 1 Broadway, New York City
