= 1450 Brickell =

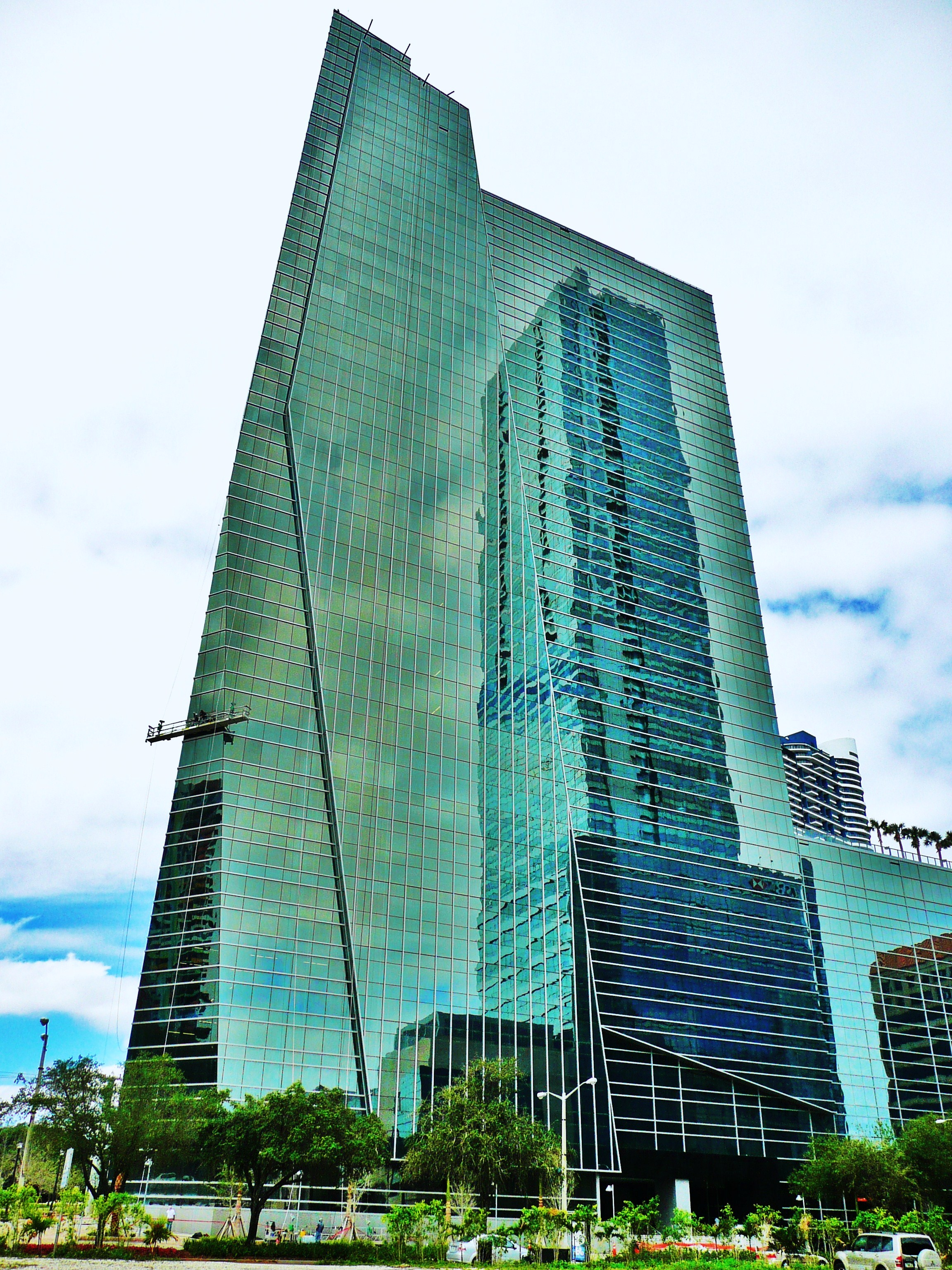
- 1450 Brickell, with the Four Seasons Hotel Miami reflected on the side.

General information
- Status: Completed
- Type: Office
- Location: 1450 Brickell Avenue, Miami, Florida, United States
- Coordinates: 25.75914°N 80.19261°W
- Construction started: August 2006
- Completed: January 2010
- Opening: 2010

Height
- Roof: 540 ft (165 m)

Technical details
- Floor count: 35

Design and construction
- Architect: Nichols Architects
- Developer: Rilea Group
- Structural engineer: DeSimone Consulting Engineers
- Main contractor: Coastal Construction Group, Inc.

1450 Brickell, is an all-office skyscraper in the City of Miami, Florida, United States. It is 540 feet (165 m) tall with 35 floors. It is adjacent to One Broadway in Downtown Miami's southern Brickell Financial District. The building is located on the corner of Brickell Avenue and Broadway. Designed by Nichols Architects, and developed by The Rilea Group, the building contains more than 580,000 square feet (54,000 m^{2}) of office space and 10,000 square feet of ground level retail. The project was one of several new office buildings to open in Downtown Miami in 2010.

== Design Concept ==
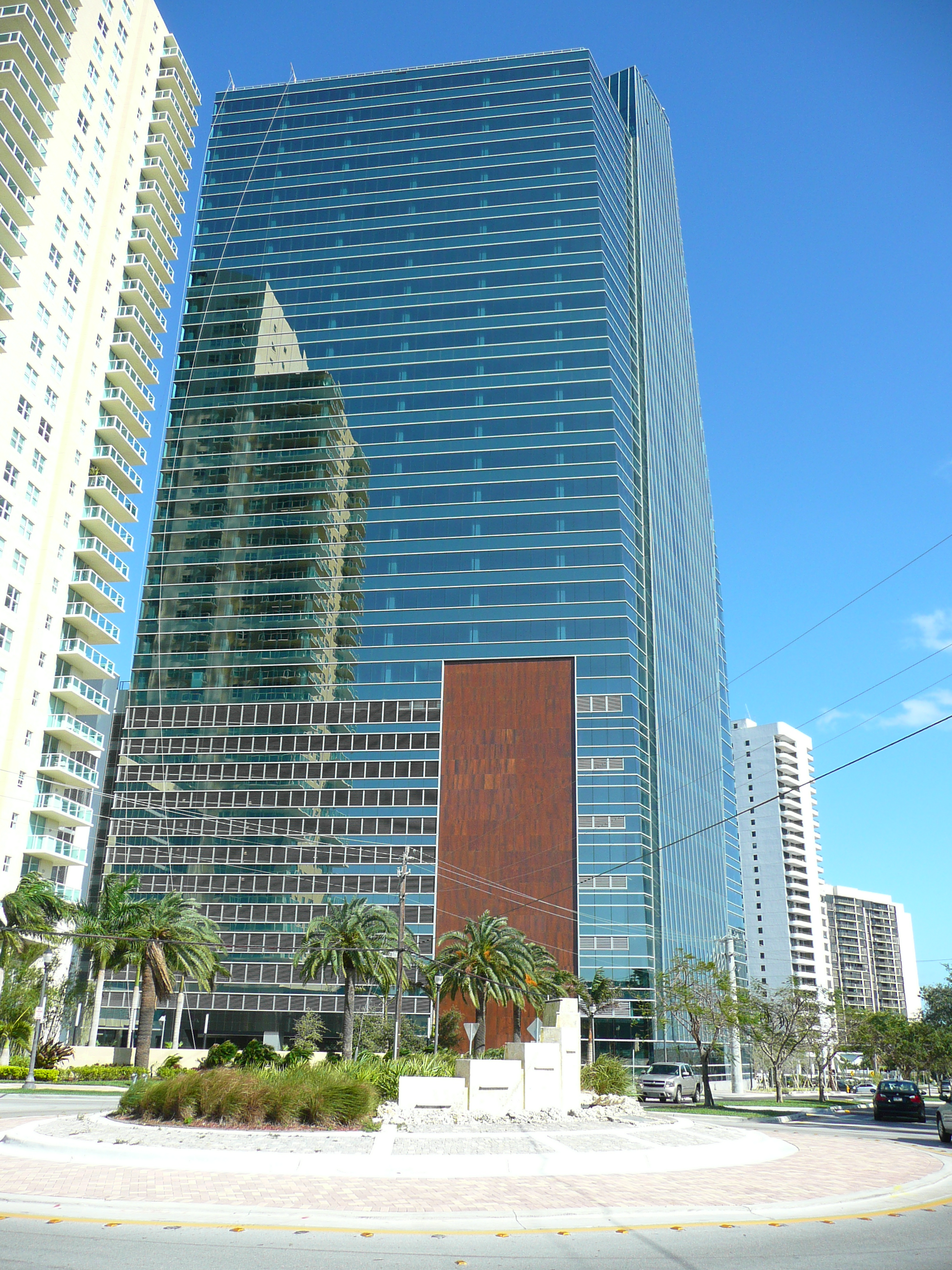
A view of 1450 Brickell from the rear

The building's location was the starting point to the tower's design, according to the Bruce Brosch, architect of the building and president of Nichols Architects at the time. Sitting on a corner with an acute angle, the building extends to the edge of the site creating its sculptural shape. Then, on the lower levels, it recedes to improve street visibility.

== Energy efficiency ==
1450 Brickell is Miami's first LEED Gold office building. Hill York, a mechanical contractor, built the utiliVisor system in the building to continuously commission the building's HVAC systems.

== Hurricane resistance ==
At the time of completion, 1450 Brickell incorporated the strongest curtainwall window system of any commercial building in the nation. The entire 35-story glass curtainwall system is designed for large-missile impact (hurricane resistance), even though Miami-Dade County only requires glass in the first 30 feet (9.1 m) of a building to be large-missile impact-resistant. DeSimone Consulting Engineers is the structural engineering firm for the project.

== See also ==
- List of tallest buildings in Miami
- List of tallest buildings in Florida
- Downtown Miami
