= Biscayne Beach =

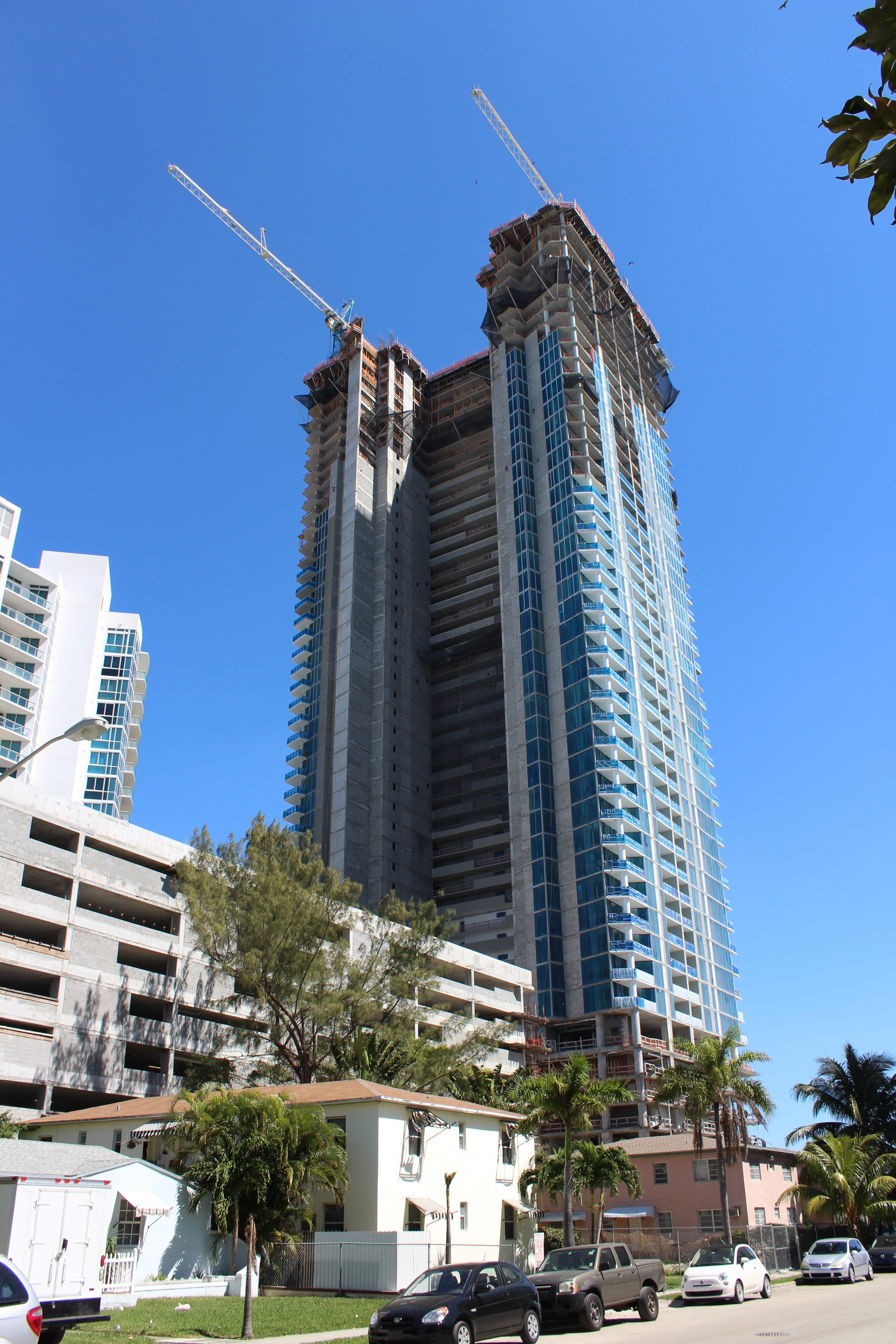
- U/C in March 2016
- Interactive map of the Biscayne Beach area

General information
- Status: Completed
- Type: Residential
- Location: 2900 NE 7th Ave, Miami, Florida, United States
- Coordinates: 25.8049°N 80.1855°W
- Construction started: 2014
- Completed: 2017
- Opening: April 2017

Height
- Roof: 550 ft (170 m)

Technical details
- Floor count: 52

Biscayne Beach is a residential high-rise in the Edgewater neighborhood of Miami, Florida, U.S.A. The building rises to 550 feet (168 m) with 52 floors. In 2021 a combined Penthouse unit totaling over 20000 ft² was sold, considered the largest condo sale by square footage in the county.

== See also ==
- List of tallest buildings in Miami
