= Quantum on the Bay =

Skyscrapers in Florida, United States

Quantum on the Bay North Tower
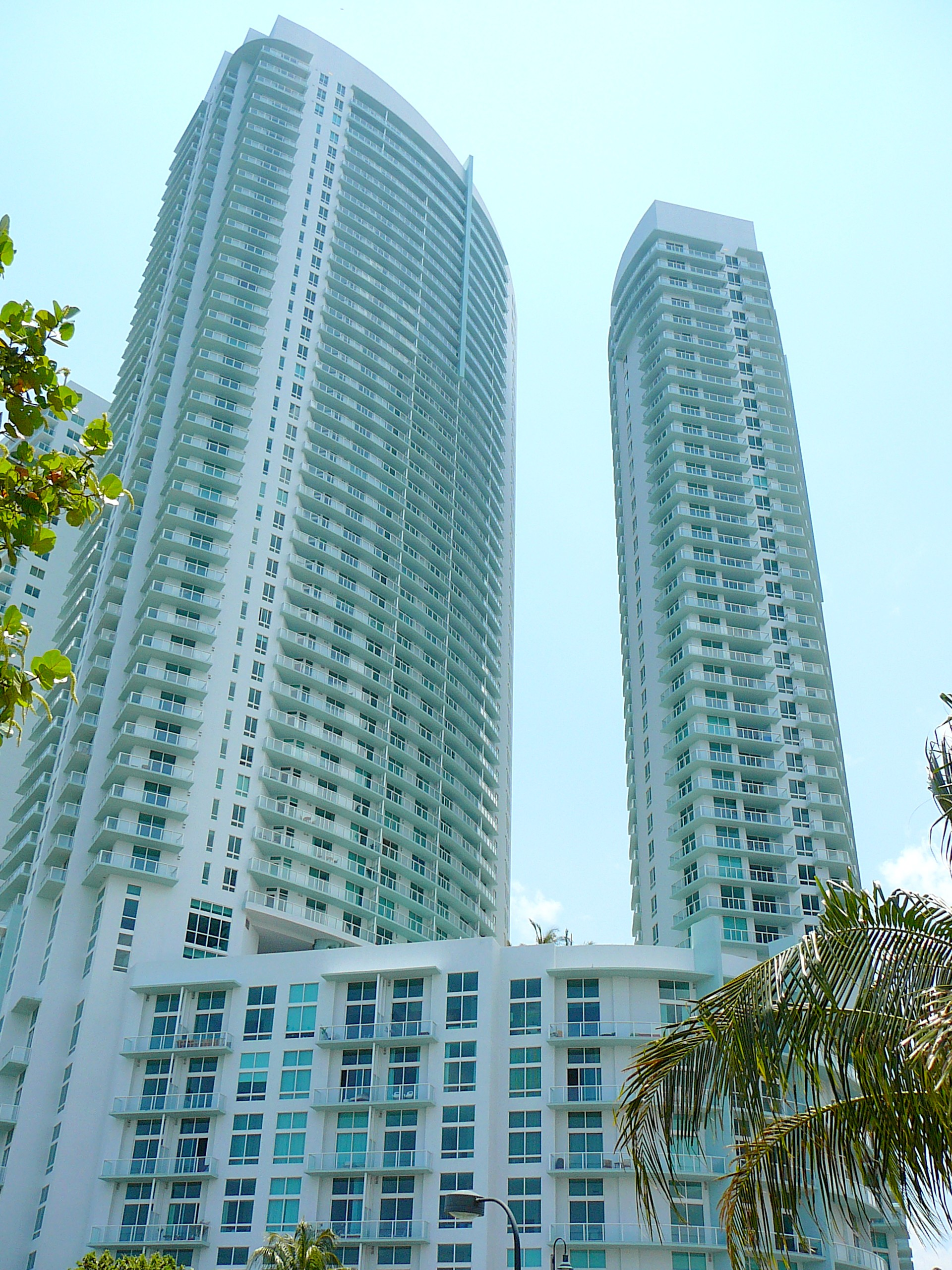
- Quantum on the Bay North and South Towers completed in 2008
- Interactive map of the Quantum on the Bay North Tower area

General information
- Type: Residential
- Location: 1900 N Bayshore Dr, Miami, Florida, United States
- Coordinates: 25.794846°N 80.187275°W
- Construction started: 2005
- Completed: 2008
- Opening: 2008

Height
- Roof: 536 ft (163 m)

Technical details
- Floor count: 44

Design and construction
- Architects: Nichols Brosch Sandoval & Associates, Inc

Quantum on the Bay South Tower
- Interactive map of the Quantum on the Bay South Tower area

General information
- Type: Residential
- Location: Miami, Florida, United States
- Construction started: 2005
- Completed: 2008
- Opening: 2008

Height
- Roof: 554 ft (169 m)

Technical details
- Floor count: 51

Design and construction
- Architects: Nichols Brosch Sandoval & Associates, Inc

Quantum on the Bay is a complex of skyscrapers in the City of Miami, Florida, United States. It is located just north of Downtown Miami in the Edgewater neighborhood. The complex consists of two main towers, the Quantum on the Bay South Tower and the Quantum on the Bay North Tower. The South Tower, the taller of the two, rises 554 feet (169 m) and 51 floors high. The North Tower is 536 feet (163 m) tall with 44 floors. Both towers were structurally completed in January 2008 and opened in April 2008. The towers are connected by a retail and parking center at the base. All space above the tenth floor is dedicated to residential units. The complex is located on North Bayshore Drive and Northeast 19th Street. The architect is Nichols Brosch Sandoval & Associates, Inc.

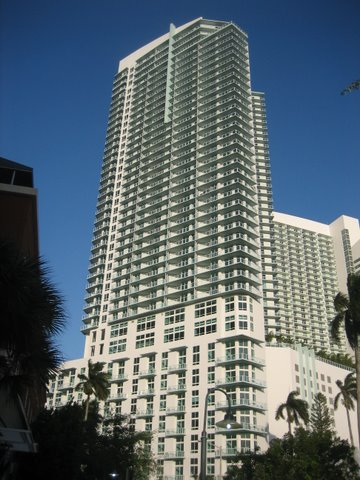
View from across the street

== See also ==
- List of tallest buildings in Miami
- List of tallest buildings in Florida
- Downtown Miami
