= Plaza on Brickell =

Skyscrapers in Florida, United States

Plaza on Brickell Tower I
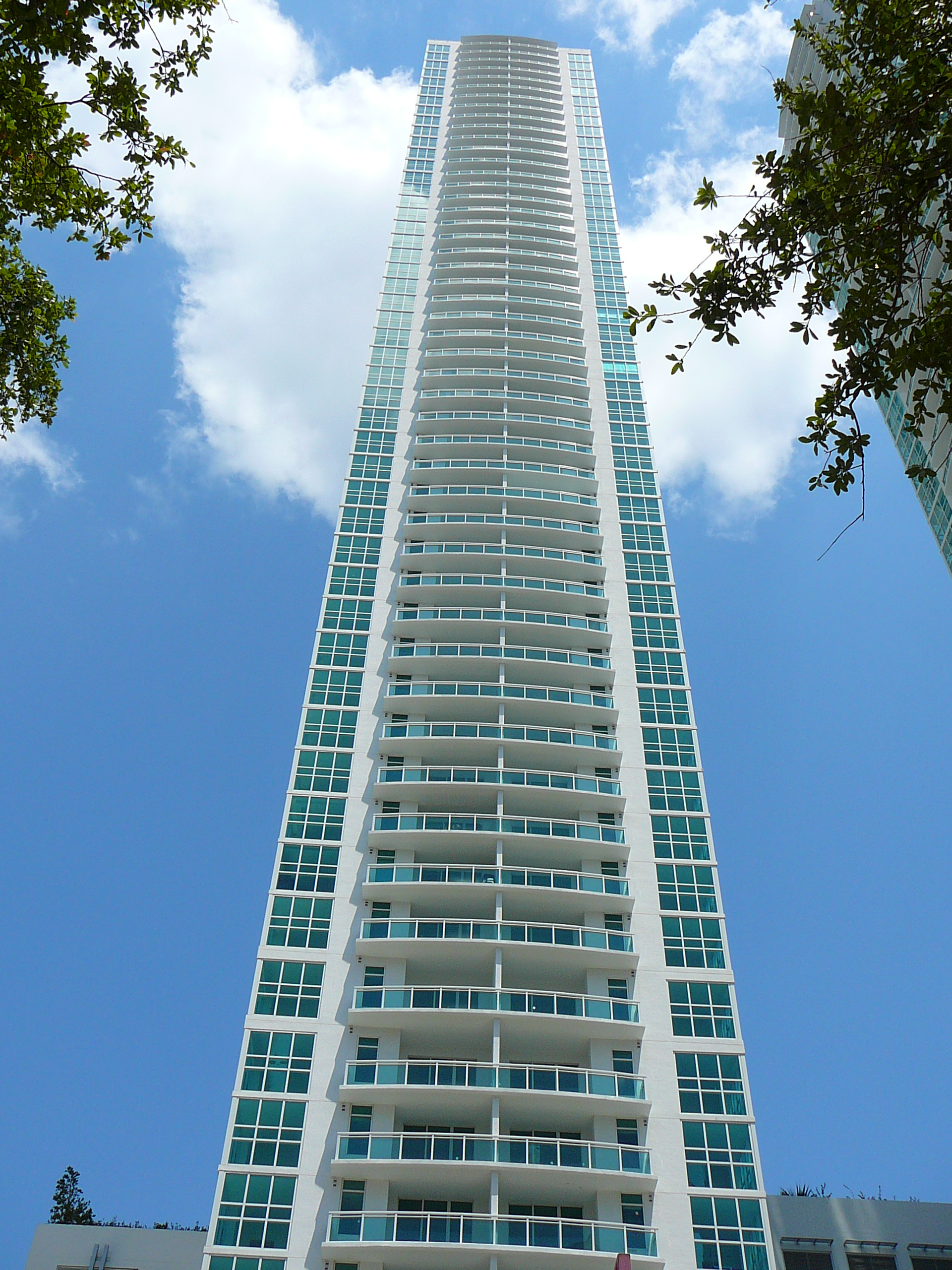
- The Plaza on Brickell Tower I
- Interactive map of the Plaza on Brickell Tower I area

General information
- Type: Residential
- Location: 900 Brickell Avenue, Miami, Florida, United States
- Coordinates: 25.764973°N 80.190529°W
- Construction started: 2005
- Completed: 2007
- Opening: 2007

Height
- Roof: 186 m (610 ft)

Technical details
- Floor count: 56

Design and construction
- Architects: Nichols Brosch Wurst Wolf & Associates

Plaza on Brickell is an urban development in Miami, Florida, United States. The complex consists of two skyscrapers and a retail center at the base, connecting the two towers. The towers completed construction in late 2007. The Plaza on Brickell Tower I, the taller of the two buildings, rises 186 metres (610 ft) and 56 floors. The Plaza on Brickell Tower II is 525 feet (160 m) tall, and has 43 floors. The two towers, although different in height, are twin towers in design. Both are built on land at the corner of Brickell Avenue and Southeast 9th Street, in the northern Brickell Financial District. The architecture of the complex was designed by Nichols Architects, a Coral Gables firm formerly known as NBWW (Nichols Brosch Wurst Wolf & Associates). The Plaza on Brickell is in a great location that is very walker friendly with quick access to The Brickell City Centre, Mary Brickell Village, and Brickell Key.

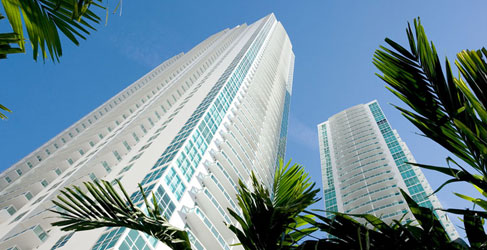
View from the street

== See also ==
- List of tallest buildings in Miami
- Downtown Miami
- List of tallest buildings in Florida

Plaza on Brickell Tower II
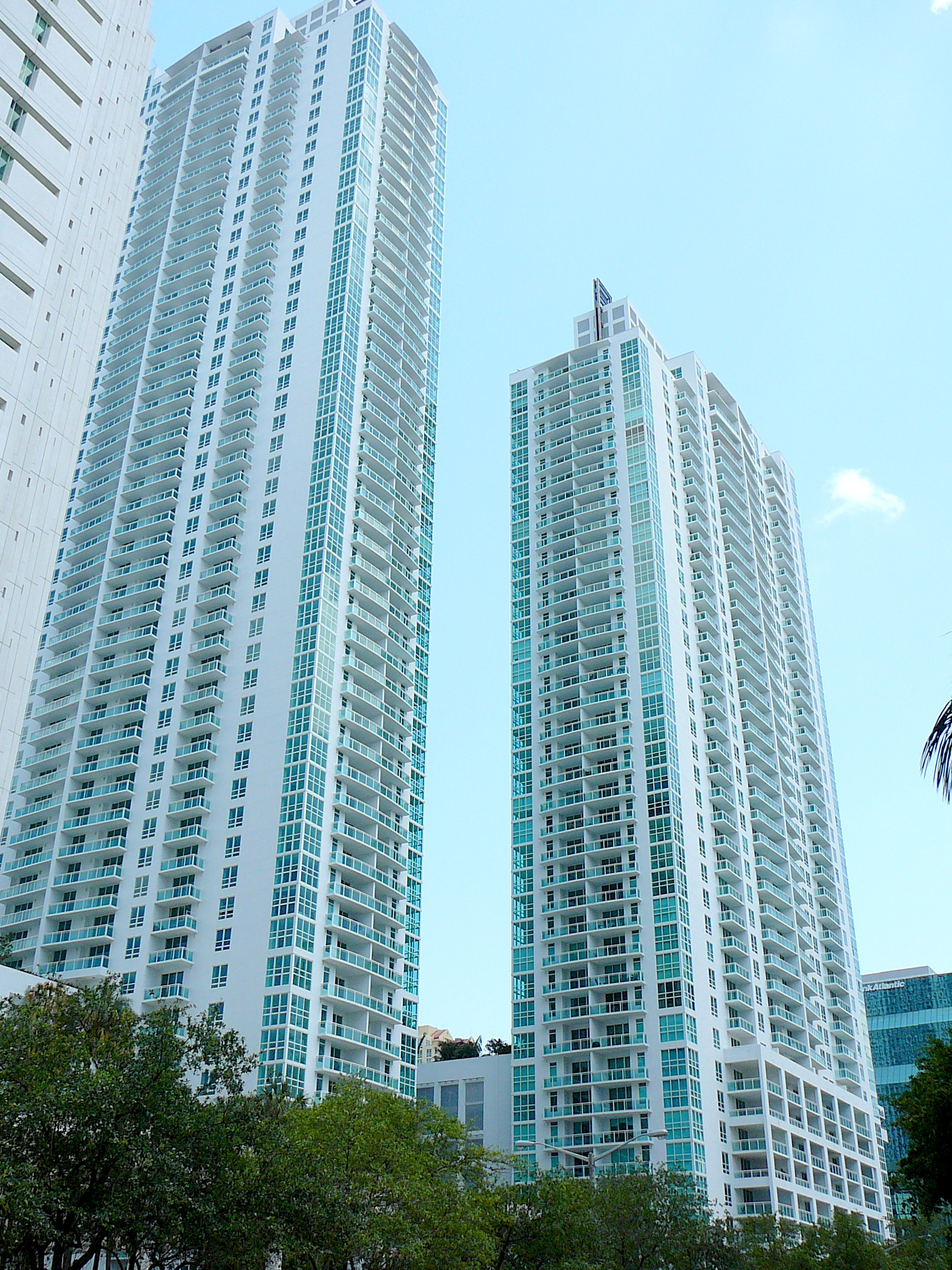
- The Plaza on Brickell Towers I & II
- Interactive map of the Plaza on Brickell Tower II area

General information
- Type: Residential
- Location: 900 Brickell Avenue, Miami, Florida, United States
- Construction started: 2005
- Completed: 2007
- Opening: 2007

Height
- Roof: 525 ft (160 m)

Technical details
- Floor count: 43

Design and construction
- Architects: Nichols Brosch Wurst Wolf & Associates
