= Avenue on Brickell =

Complex in Miami

Coordinates: 25°45′47″N 80°11′31″W

Avenue on Brickell East Tower
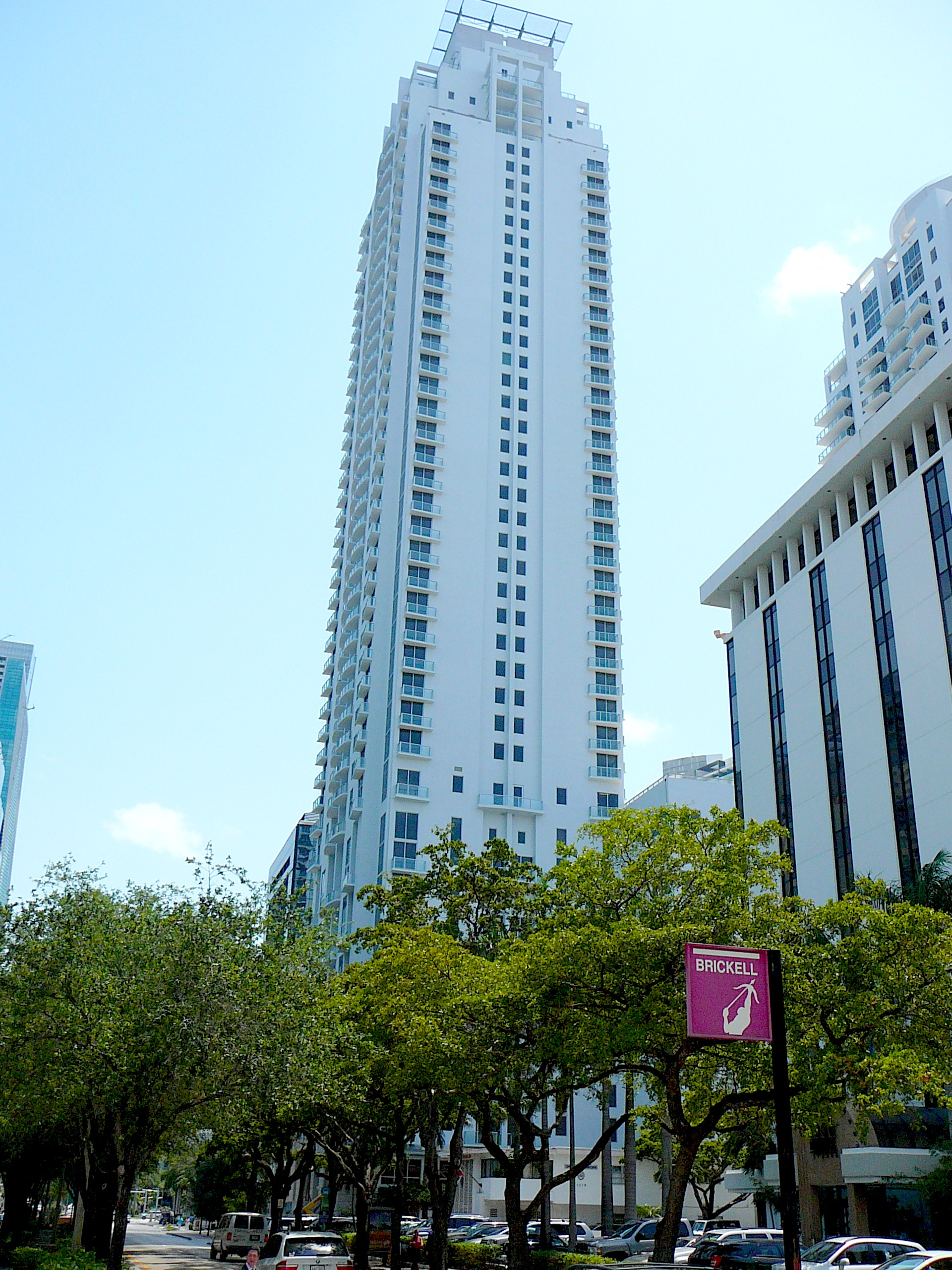
- Avenue on Brickell East tower, on Brickell Avenue
- Interactive map of the Avenue on Brickell East Tower area

General information
- Type: Residential
- Location: 1060 Brickell Avenue, Miami, Florida, United States
- Construction started: 2005
- Completed: 2007
- Opening: 2007

Height
- Antenna spire: 495 ft (151 m)
- Roof: 480 ft (146 m)

Technical details
- Floor count: 47

Design and construction
- Architect: SB Architects

Avenue on Brickell West Tower
- Interactive map of the Avenue on Brickell West Tower area

General information
- Type: Residential
- Location: 1050 Brickell, or SE 1st Avenue, Miami, Florida, United States
- Construction started: 2004
- Completed: 2007
- Opening: 2007

Height
- Roof: 365 ft (111 m)

Technical details
- Floor count: 35

Design and construction
- Architect: SB Architects

Avenue on Brickell is a residential high-rise complex in the Brickell district of Miami, Florida, United States. The project consists of two high-rise residential towers, Avenue on Brickell East Tower and Avenue on Brickell West Tower. Both towers were topped off in early 2007, and were structurally completed in late 2007. Avenue East Tower, the taller of the two buildings, stands at 495 feet (151 meters), with 47 floors and its entrance is on Brickell Avenue. Avenue West Tower is the shorter building of the complex, standing at 365 ft (111 m) with 35 floors and its entrance is on Southeast 1st Avenue, a block away from Brickell Avenue. Both buildings were designed by SB Architects.

== See also ==
- List of tallest buildings in Miami
