= Wind (Miami) =

Coordinates: 25°46′14″N 80°11′39″W

Wind Tower
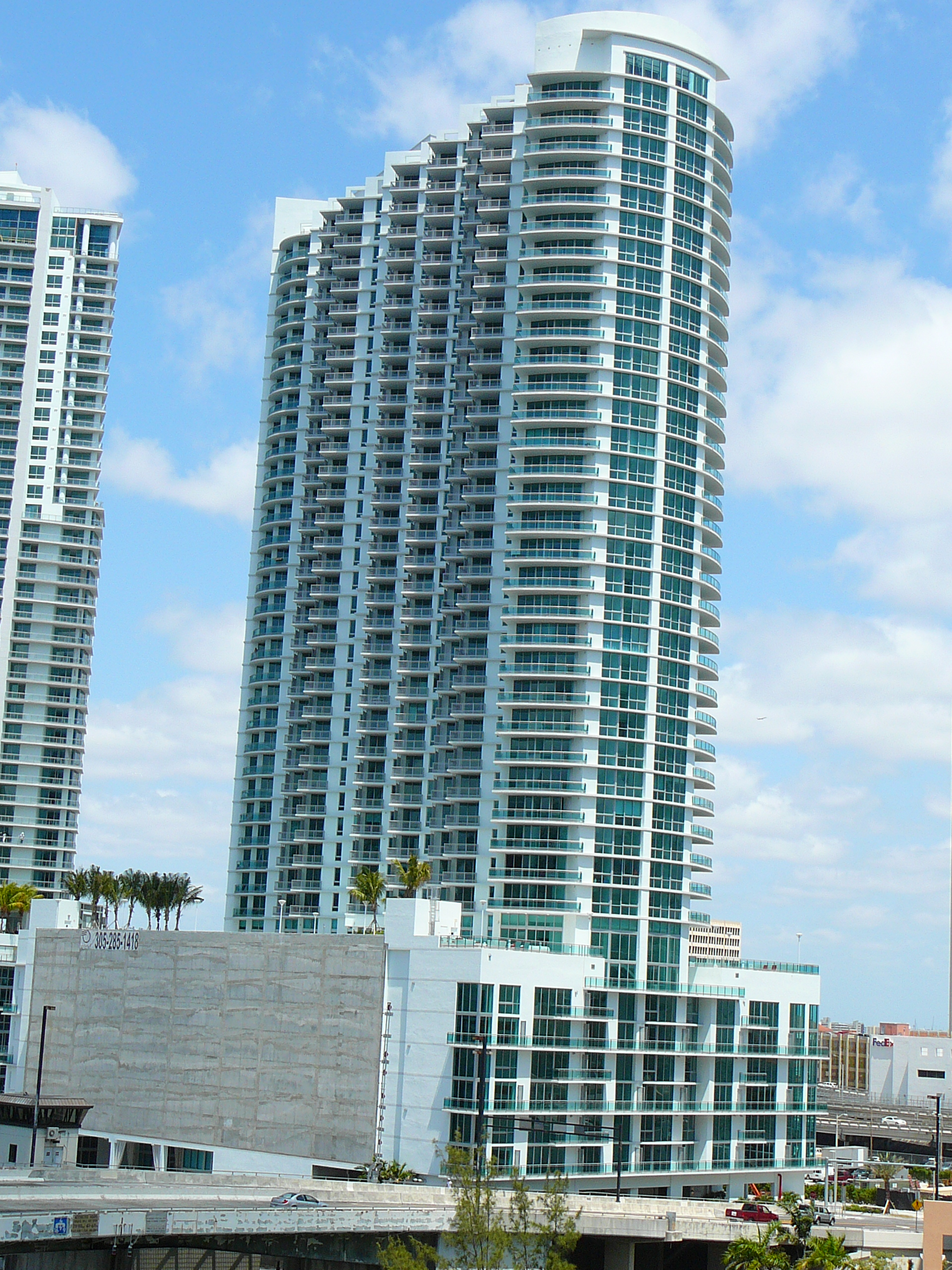
- The Wind Tower in May 2008, from the southeast
- Interactive map of the Wind Tower area

General information
- Type: Residential
- Location: 350 South Miami Ave. 33130 Miami, Florida, United States
- Construction started: 2005
- Completed: 2008
- Opening: 2008

Height
- Roof: 501 ft (153 m)

Technical details
- Floor count: 41

Design and construction
- Architect: Revuelta Vega Leon

Wind Tower is a skyscraper in Downtown Miami, Florida, United States. It was completed in early 2008 and, it is the third skyscraper within the River Front East complex, on the north bank of the Miami River. The structure is located on the northeastern most quadrant of the complex, with most proximity to the intersection of SE 3rd Street and Miami Avenue.

Standing at 501 ft (153 m) tall, the tower has a total of 41 floors. The ground level is used for retail space and the main entrance and lobby areas. The garage utilizes floors 2 through 8, with high security and restricted to residents only. The 9th and 10th houses the building's recreation center, consisting of a pool area, racquetball court, fitness and spas and wellness facilities. Floors 11-41 are used for the standard residential units, while floors 3, 5 and 7 house a limited number of double-floor lofts.

The architect is Revuelta Vega Leon, who also designed the rest of the River Front East complex.

== See also ==
- List of tallest buildings in Miami
- River Front East

== Gallery ==
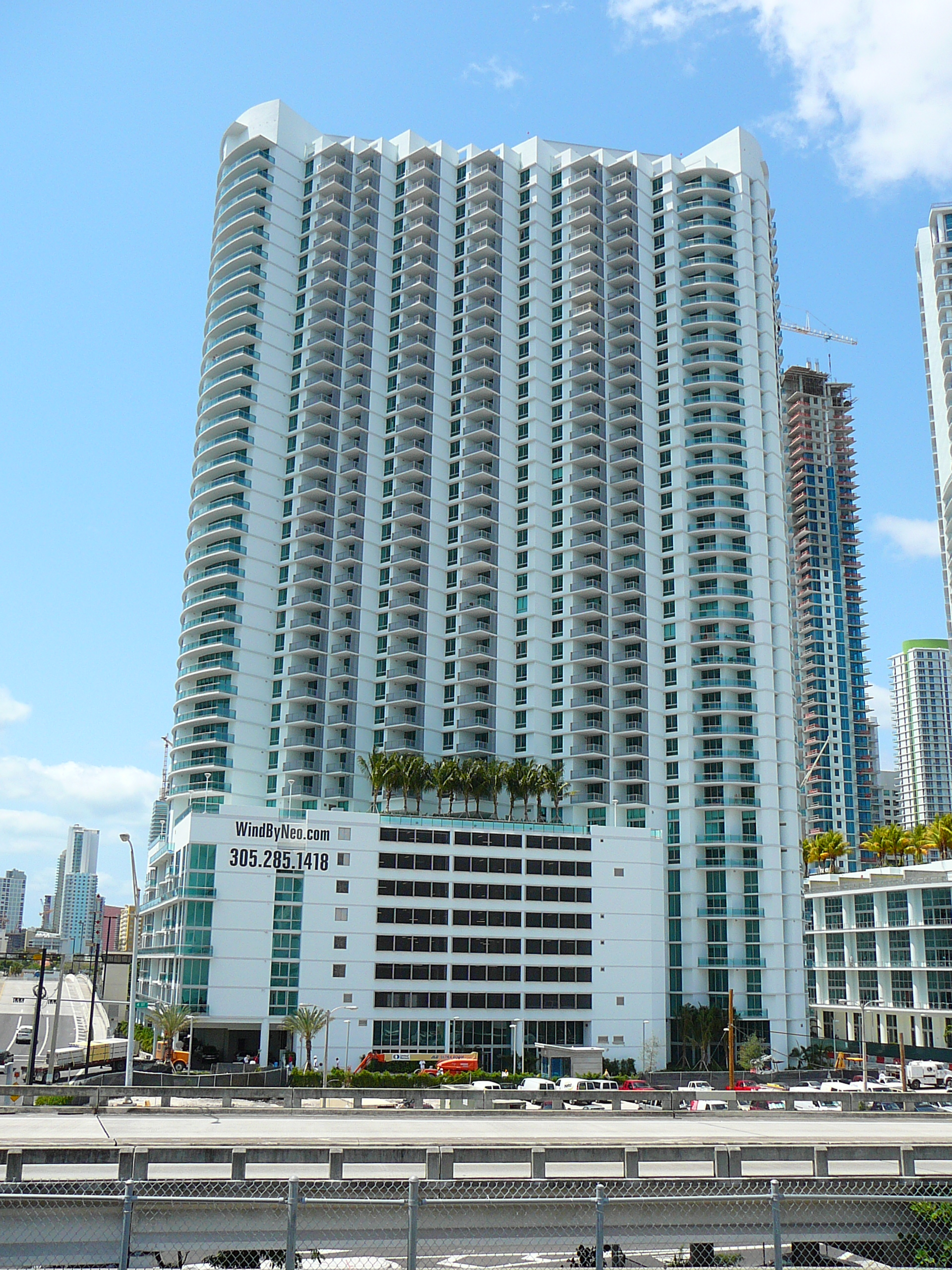
The Wind Tower in May 2008, from the north
