= Asia (Miami) =

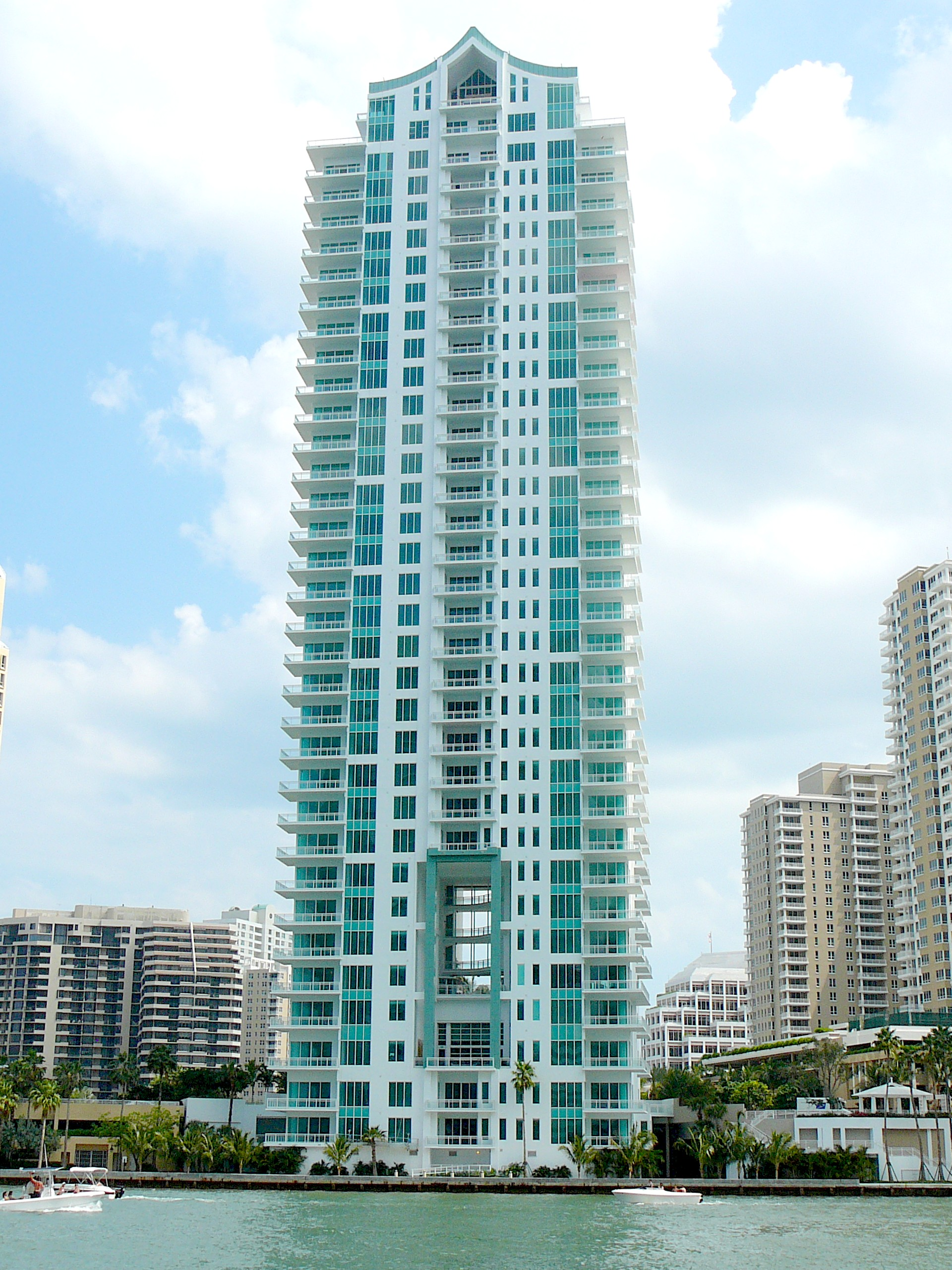
- The Asia tower on Brickell Key in Downtown Miami at the mouth of the Miami River

General information
- Type: Residential
- Location: 900 Brickell Key Boulevard, Miami, Florida, United States
- Coordinates: 25.769349°N 80.185631°W
- Construction started: 2005
- Completed: 2008
- Opening: 2008

Height
- Roof: 483 ft (147 m)

Technical details
- Floor count: 36

Design and construction
- Architect: J Scott Architecture

Asia is a residential skyscraper on Brickell Key in the Brickell district of Downtown Miami, Florida, United States. The tower rises 483 feet (147 m), with 36 floors. Asia was topped out in mid-2007, and was completed structurally in January 2008. When built, it was among the tallest buildings in Miami, ranking near the top 20, but as of 2025 its not within the top 75. The tower is one of several new residential developments taking place in Miami, and is a part of the city's first Manhattanization wave of the mid to late 00s. The architectural firm who designed the building was J Scott Architecture. Asia Miami features 123 total residences serviced by 5 private elevators.

== Zoned schools ==
Residents are zoned to Miami-Dade County Public Schools. Zoned schools include Southside Elementary School, Shenandoah Middle School, and Booker T. Washington High School.

== See also ==
- List of tallest buildings in Miami
