= 1010 Brickell =

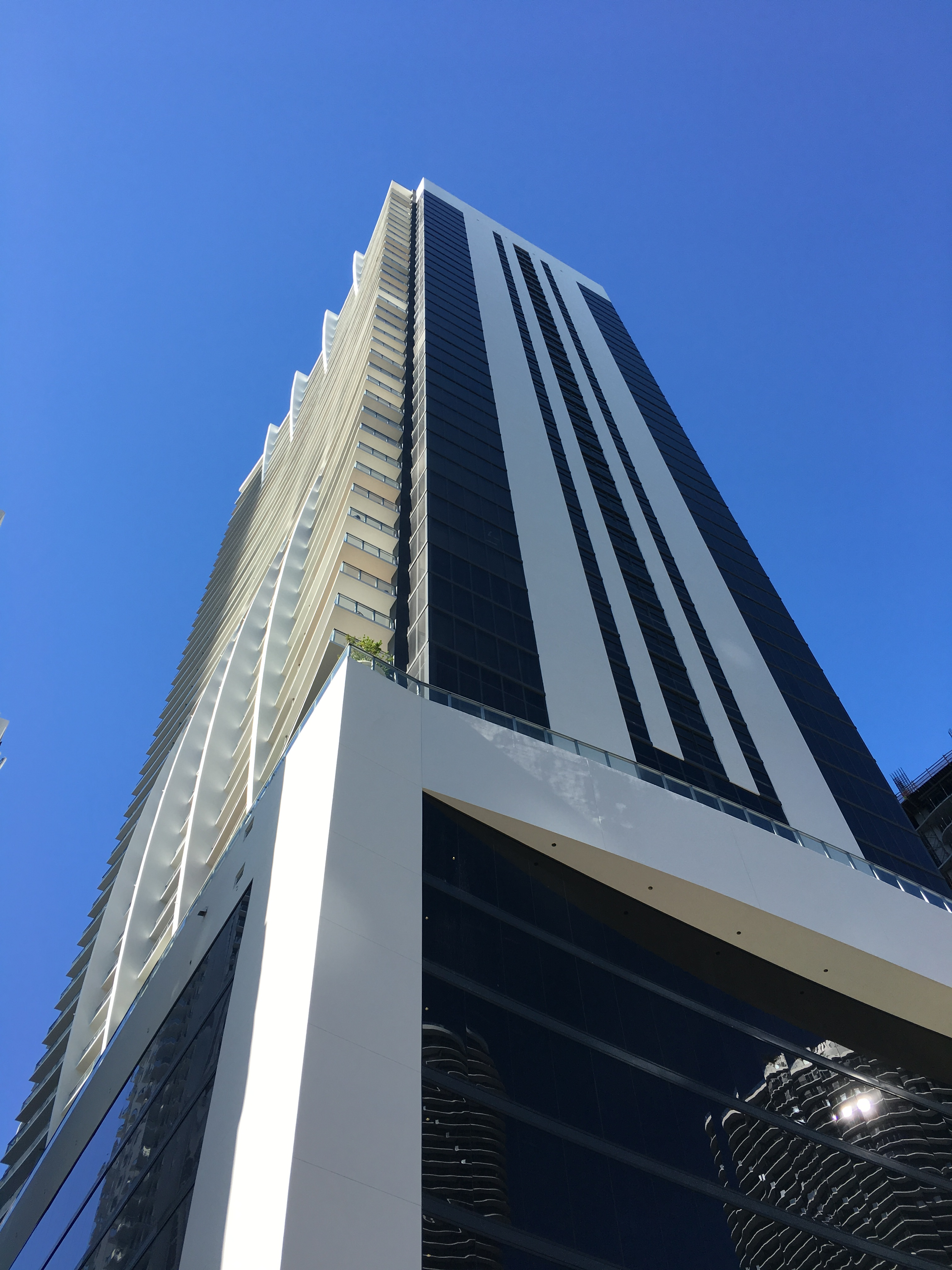
- 1010 Brickell viewed from 10th Street
- Interactive map of the 1010 Brickell area

General information
- Type: Residential
- Location: 1010 Brickell Avenue, Miami, Florida, United States
- Coordinates: 25.7641°N 80.1922°W
- Construction started: November 2014
- Completed: August 2017

Height
- Height: 548 feet (167 m)

Technical details
- Floor count: 50

Design and construction
- Architect: Sieger Suárez

1010 Brickell is a residential high-rise in the Brickell neighborhood of Miami, Florida. It is located behind an office building at 1000 Brickell Avenue, adjacent to the Tenth Street Metromover station. Construction began in 2014 and required the demolition of an existing parking garage. The building is expected to rise about 548 feet (167 m) with 50 floors and nearly 400 units, with ceiling heights of 9.28 feet (2.83 m). The 5,600 cubic yards (4,300 m^{3}) mat pour was completed on April 4, 2015.

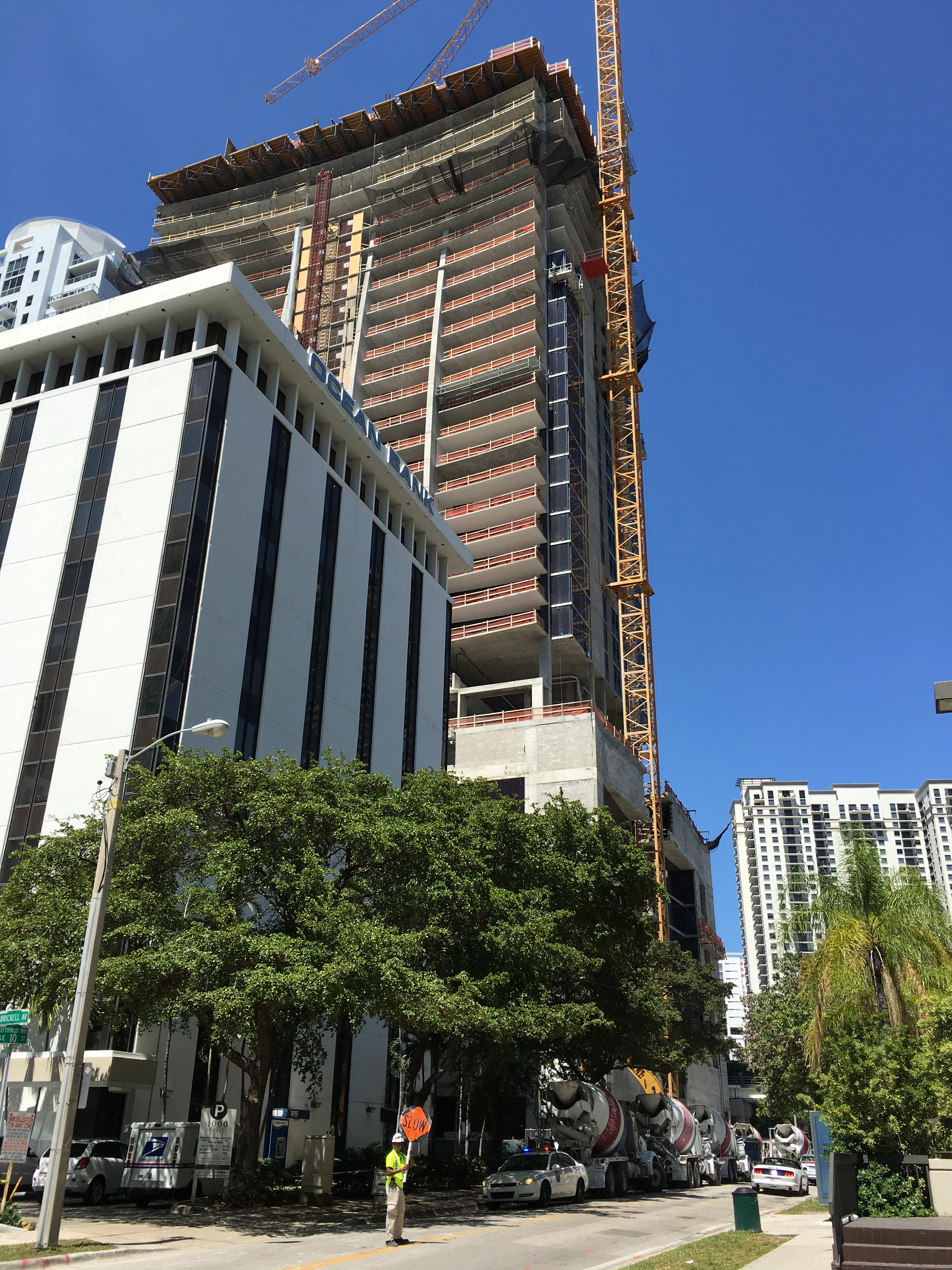
1010 Brickell construction in May 2016 from the east on 10th Street

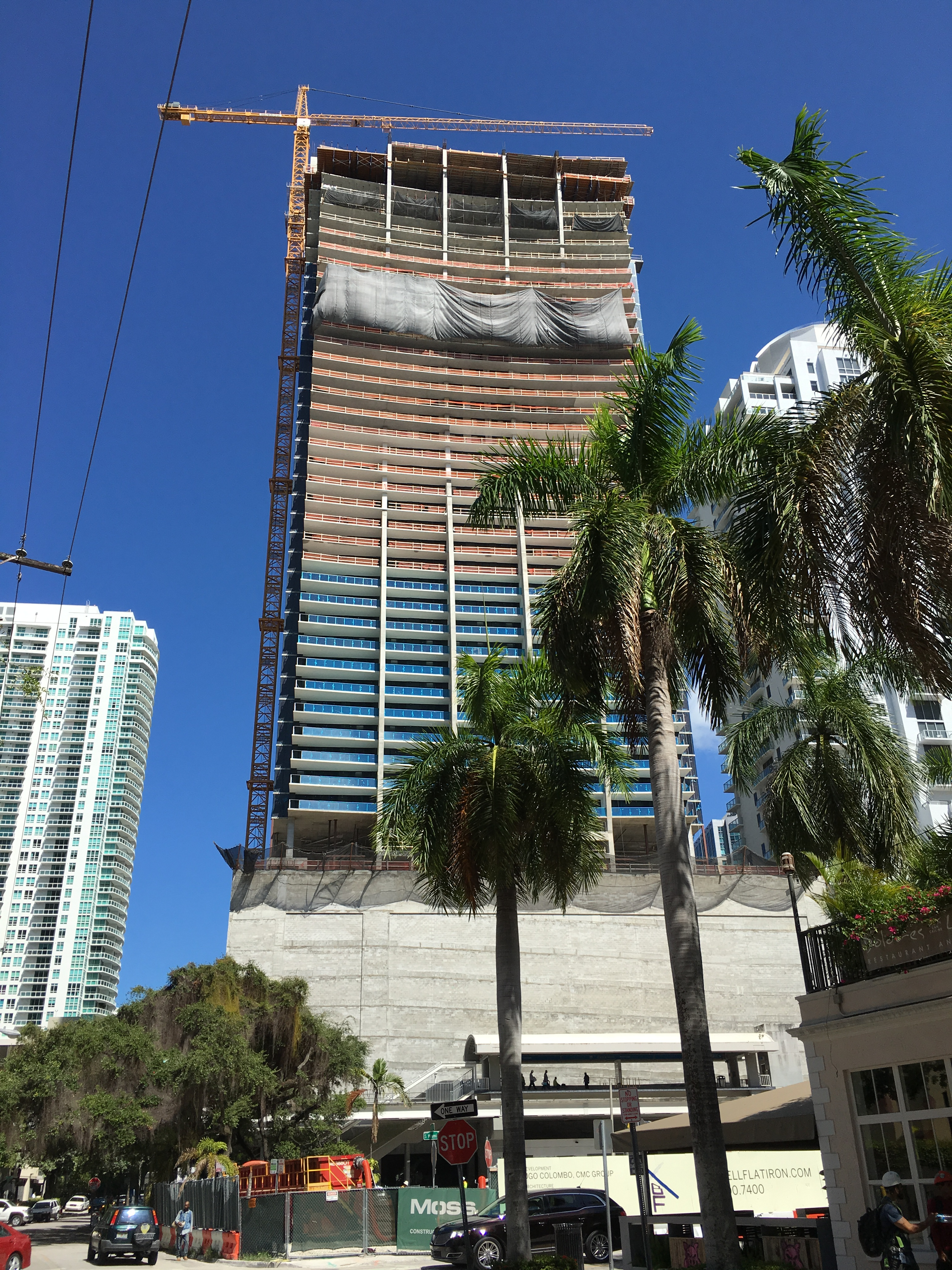
Construction from the west

== See also ==
- List of tallest buildings in Miami
