= Vizcayne =

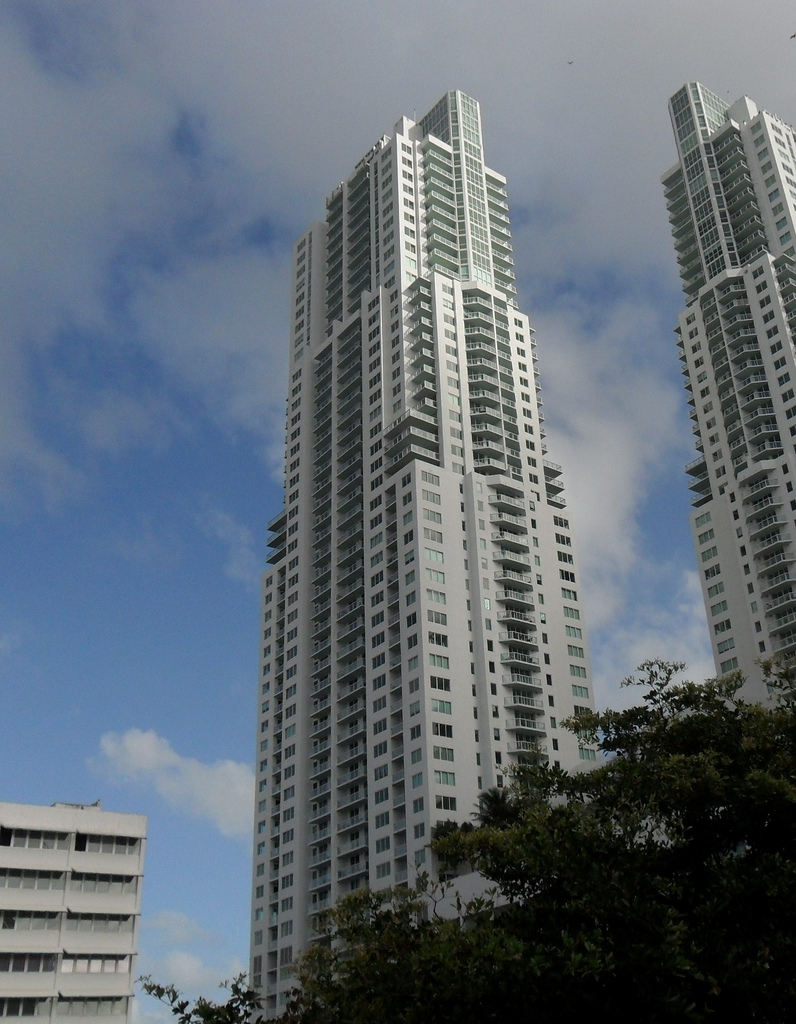
- The Vizcayne North Tower (left) and South Tower (right)
- Interactive map of the Vizcayne area

General information
- Type: Residential
- Location: 253 Northeast 2nd Street, Miami, Florida, United States
- Coordinates: 25.776733°N 80.188836°W
- Construction started: 2005
- Completed: 2008
- Opening: 2008

Height
- Roof: 538 ft (164 m)

Technical details
- Floor count: 49

Design and construction
- Architects: Fullerton-Diaz Architects, Inc
- Developer: Cabi Developers
- Main contractor: W.G. Yates (general contractor); Gryphon Construction, LLC (construction manager)

Website
- www.vizcayne.com/

Vizcayne (formerly known as "Everglades on the Bay") is an urban development in the City of Miami, Florida. It is located in northeastern Downtown Miami and consists of two residential skyscrapers, North Tower and the South Tower as well as a retail center. The buildings were topped out (reached full height) in 2007, and were completed in early 2008. They are located on Biscayne Boulevard between Northeast 2nd and 3rd Streets.

The complex consists of two twin towers and the Everglades Plaza. Both towers are 538 ft (164 m) tall, and each has 49 floors. The Everglades Plaza is a retail and community center at the base of both towers, connecting both and occupying the entire city block. The main entrance to the plaza is on Biscayne Boulevard. The towers provide retail on the street level and the rest of the floors are used for residential units. Specifically, floors 2-7 are flats and lofts, and floors 8-49 are condo units. The architect of these buildings is Fullerton-Diaz Architects, Inc. The developer is Cabi Developers, a division of GICSA. The complex is located at the site of the former Everglades Hotel, which was closed in 2003 and imploded on January 23, 2005 to make room for the new towers.

== See also ==
- List of tallest buildings in Miami
- Downtown Miami

== Gallery ==
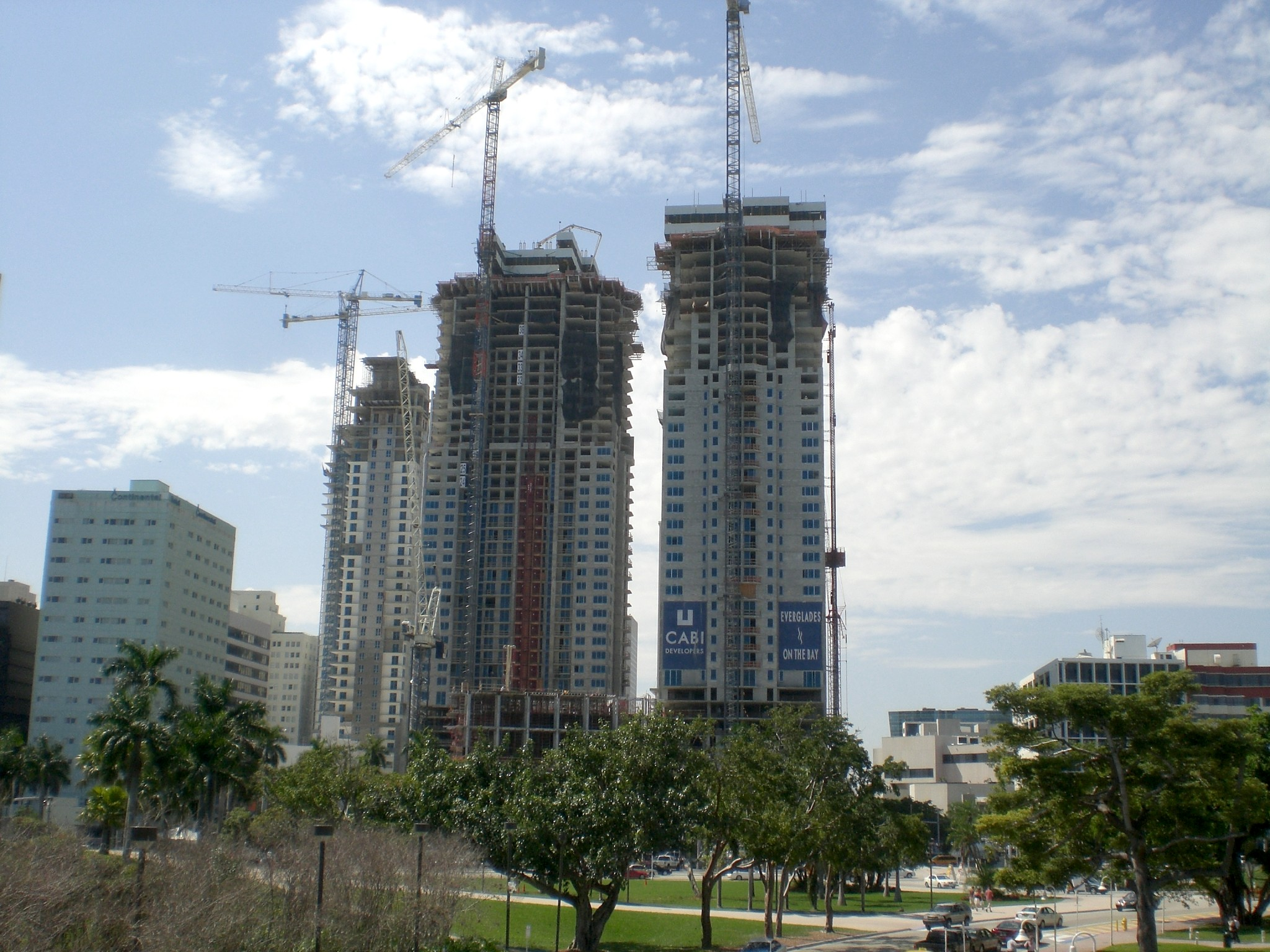
Vizcayne Twin Towers under construction in March 2007

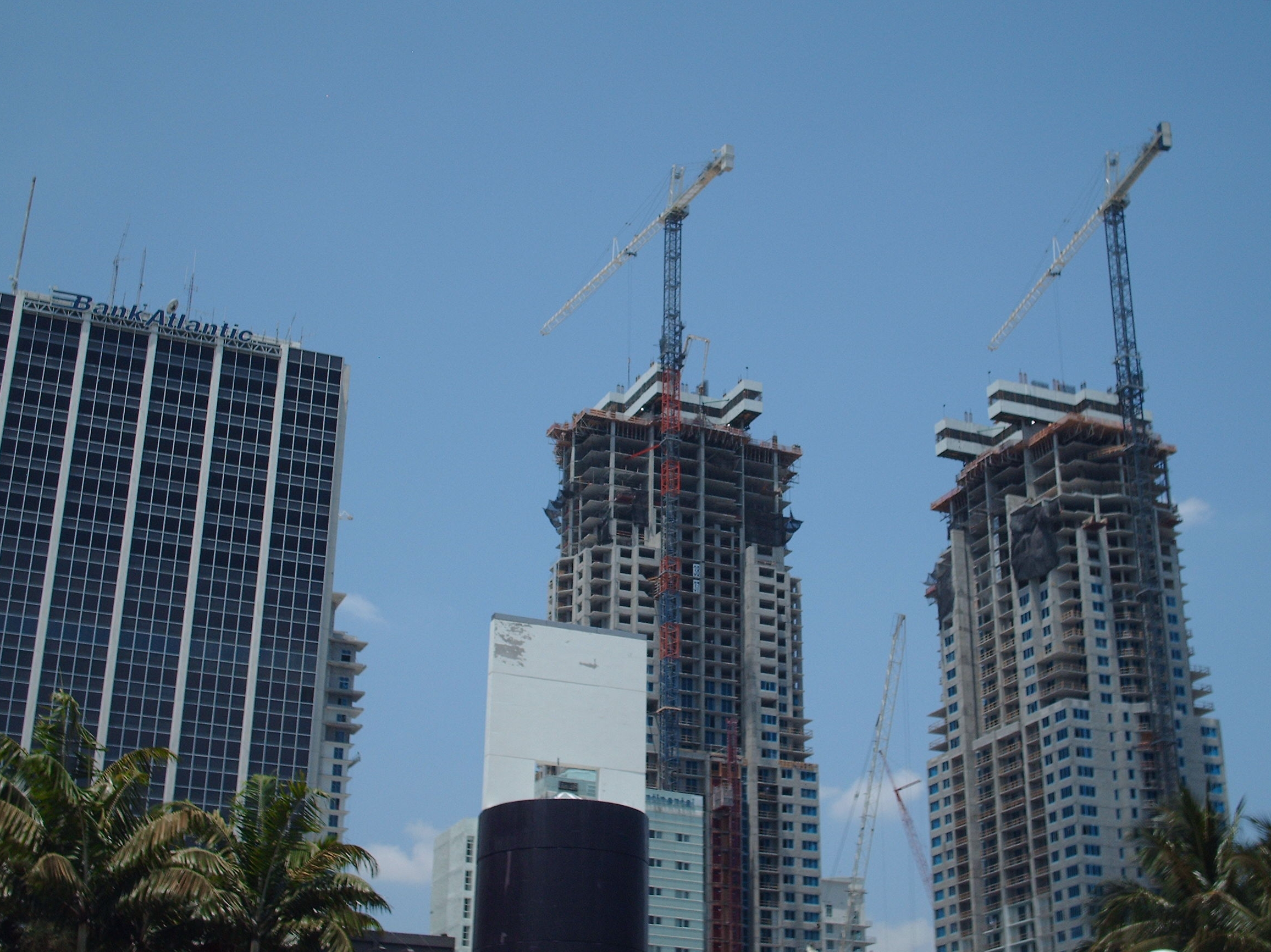
Under construction in May 2007

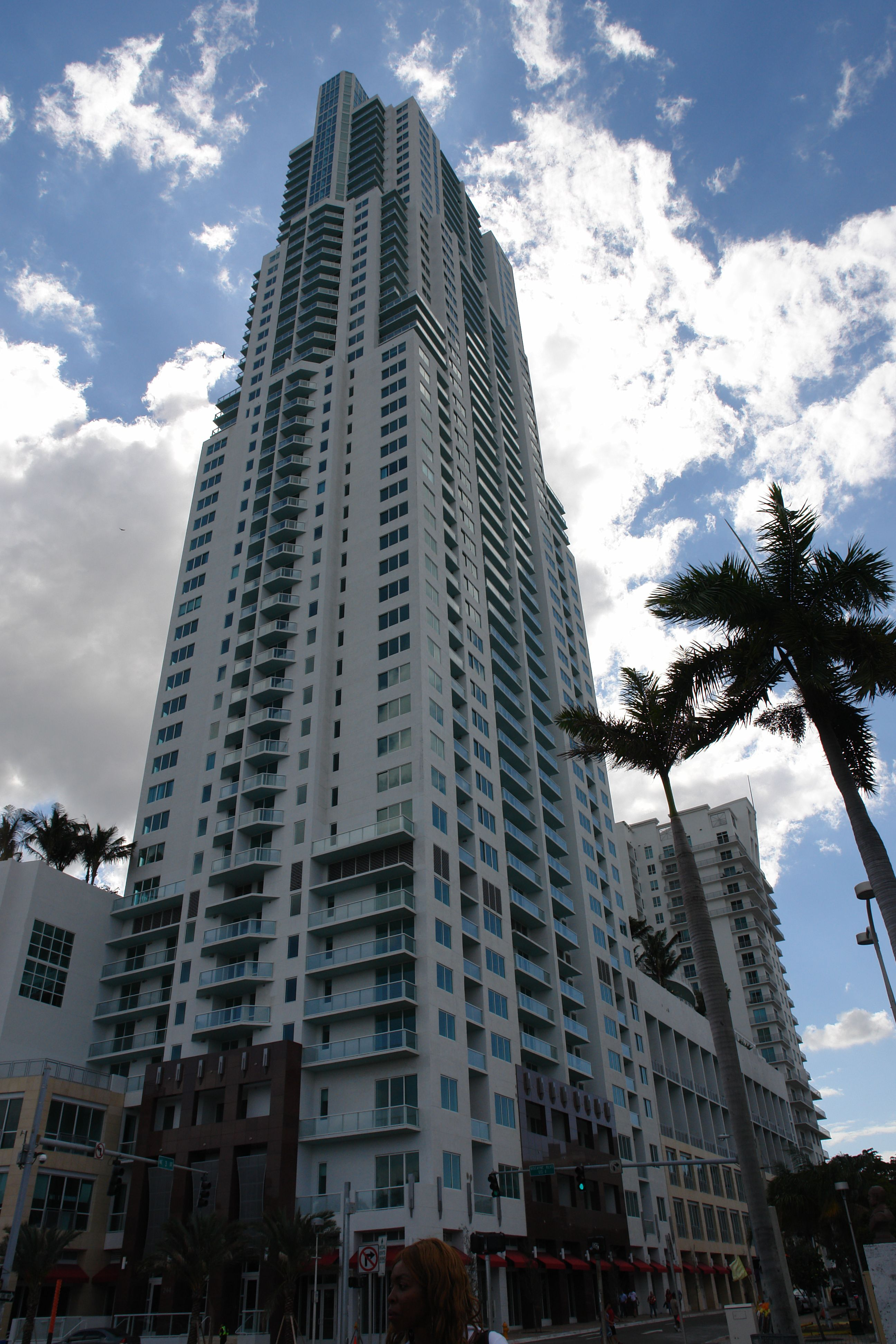

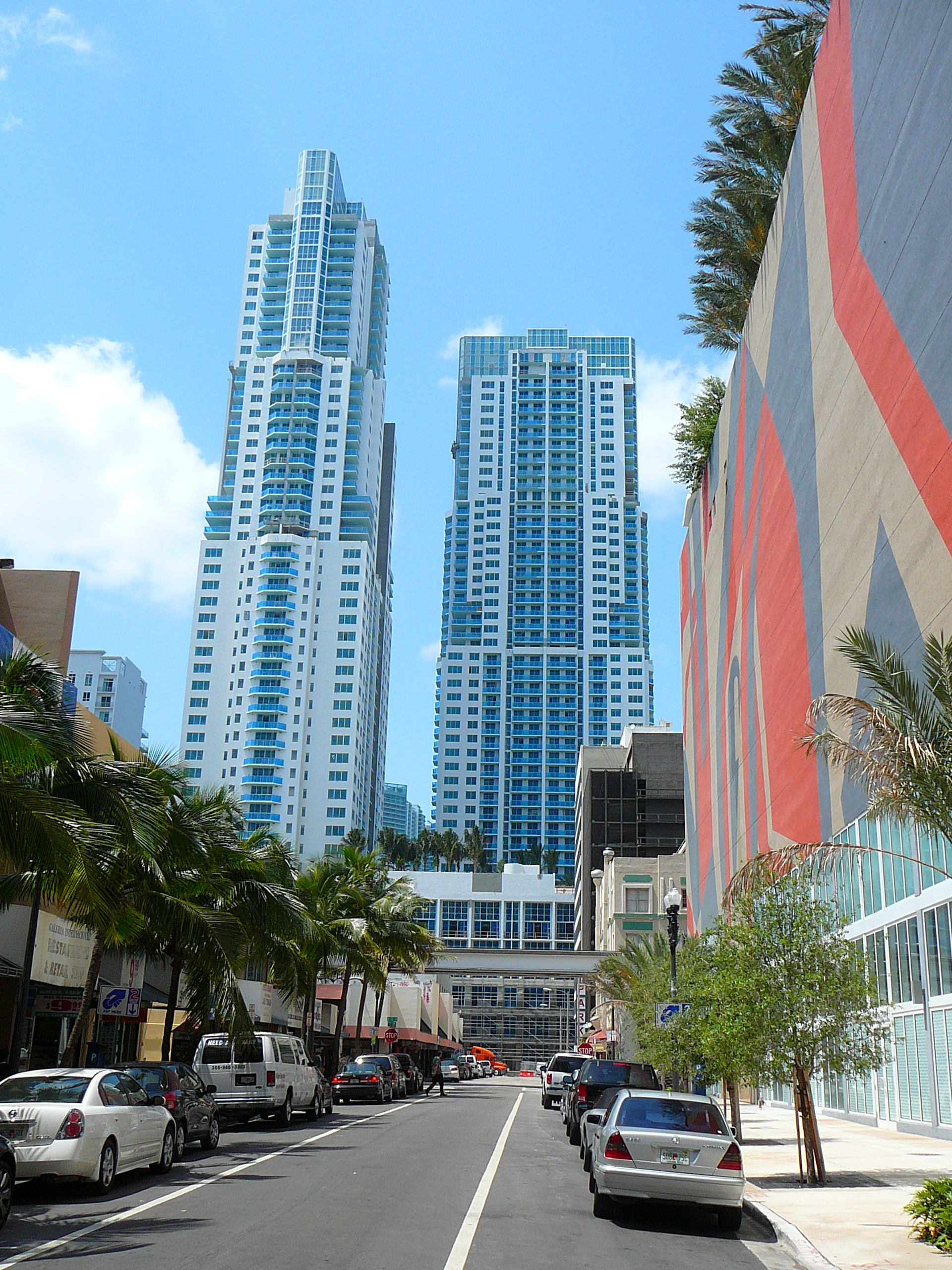
The nearly completed towers from the south, May 2008
