= One Broadway (Miami) =

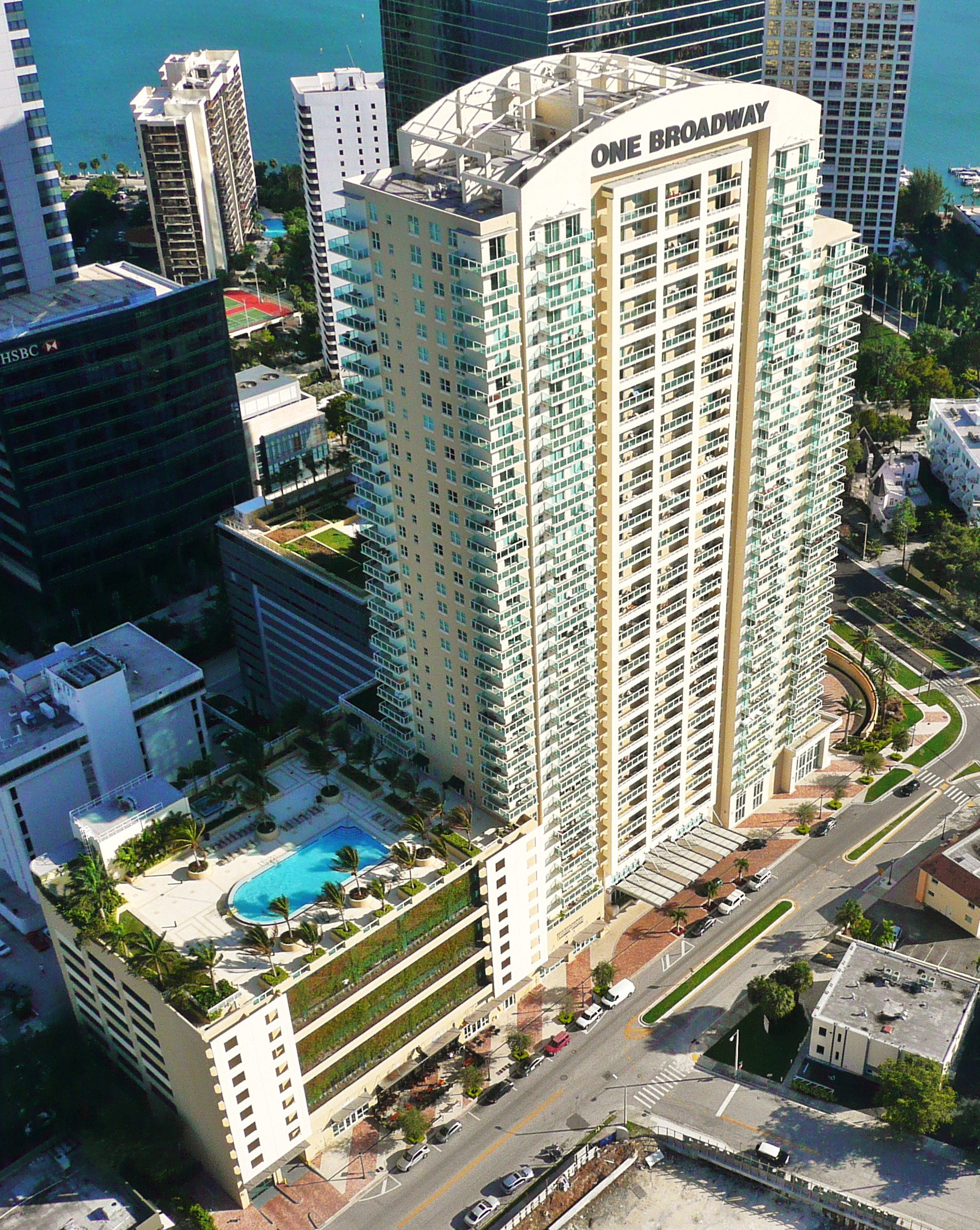
- One Broadway
- Interactive map of the One Broadway area

General information
- Type: Residential
- Location: 1451 South Miami Avenue, Miami, Florida, United States
- Coordinates: 25.759114°N 80.193549°W
- Construction started: 2002
- Completed: 2005
- Opening: 2005

Height
- Roof: 413 ft (126 m)

Technical details
- Floor count: 42

One Broadway is a residential skyscraper in the city of Miami, Florida, United States. It is located in Downtown's southern Brickell Financial District, an area of increased density with the recent building boom in Miami. The 37-story tower was completed in 2005, and is located at 1451 South Miami Avenue, two blocks west of Brickell Avenue. The building is near Southeast/Southwest 15th Road, which is known as Broadway in Brickell. The building was closed in the early 2020s for more than a year for a major renovation, including a new glass façade.

== See also ==
- List of tallest buildings in Miami
