= SkyRise Miami =

General information
- Status: Never built
- Type: Mixed use
- Location: Bayside Marketplace, Miami, Florida, United States
- Construction started: 2019
- Construction stopped: 2020

Height
- Roof: 990 ft (300 m)

Design and construction
- Architect: Arquitectonica
- Developer: Berkowitz Development Group, Inc.

Website
- www.skyrisemiami.com

SkyRise Miami was a proposed high-rise entertainment and observation tower to be built on the shore of Biscayne Bay in Miami, Florida, promoted and developed by real estate developer Jeff Berkowitz.

== Height ==
Rising to a height of 301.8 metres (990 ft), it would have been the tallest structure in Florida. The Federal Aviation Administration objected to the height.

== Original project ==
It was originally to have a tower called "Solar Universe", developed by a company called High Point Energy. It would have been a self-sufficient, vertical energy structure powered by alternative energies such as solar, wind, hydro, and biomass. It would have had 11 wind turbines to its east and a collection of solar panels covering its southern face. D’Agostino sold the rights to Solar Universe LLC to Jeffrey Berkowitz's Berkowitz Development Group, headquartered in Coconut Grove in April 2012. Berkowitz changed the name, first to Skyhigh Miami, then in August 2013, to Skyrise Miami. It was to have been located on public waterfront land adjacent to Bayside Marketplace, from which it would have sublet land. Both the City Commission and Miami voters approved the project in 2014. A significant portion of the several hundred million dollar project was to have been funded a program where foreign investors buy EB-5 visas. The project was officially cancelled on June 28, 2021.

== Controversy ==
Developer Jeff Berkowitz pledged repeatedly that SkyRise would be built at no cost to the city of Miami advertising during the campaign for the project's approval vote that "taxpayers win without putting in a cent." He made the same claim with nearly the same wording, "not one cent of Miami money", in a city commission meeting in June 2014. But months earlier, in February 2014, he had quietly applied for fifteen million dollars in economic development funding. Local blogger Al Crespo referred to Berkowitz as a "duplicitous hypocrite" for claiming that the project would be privately funded while quietly seeking public funding. Berkowitz responded by threatening to sue Crespo for "false and libelous statements", demanding that he remove from his blog the article that alleged that Berkowitz deceived Miami taxpayers.
