= List of tallest buildings in Miami =

Skyline of Miami
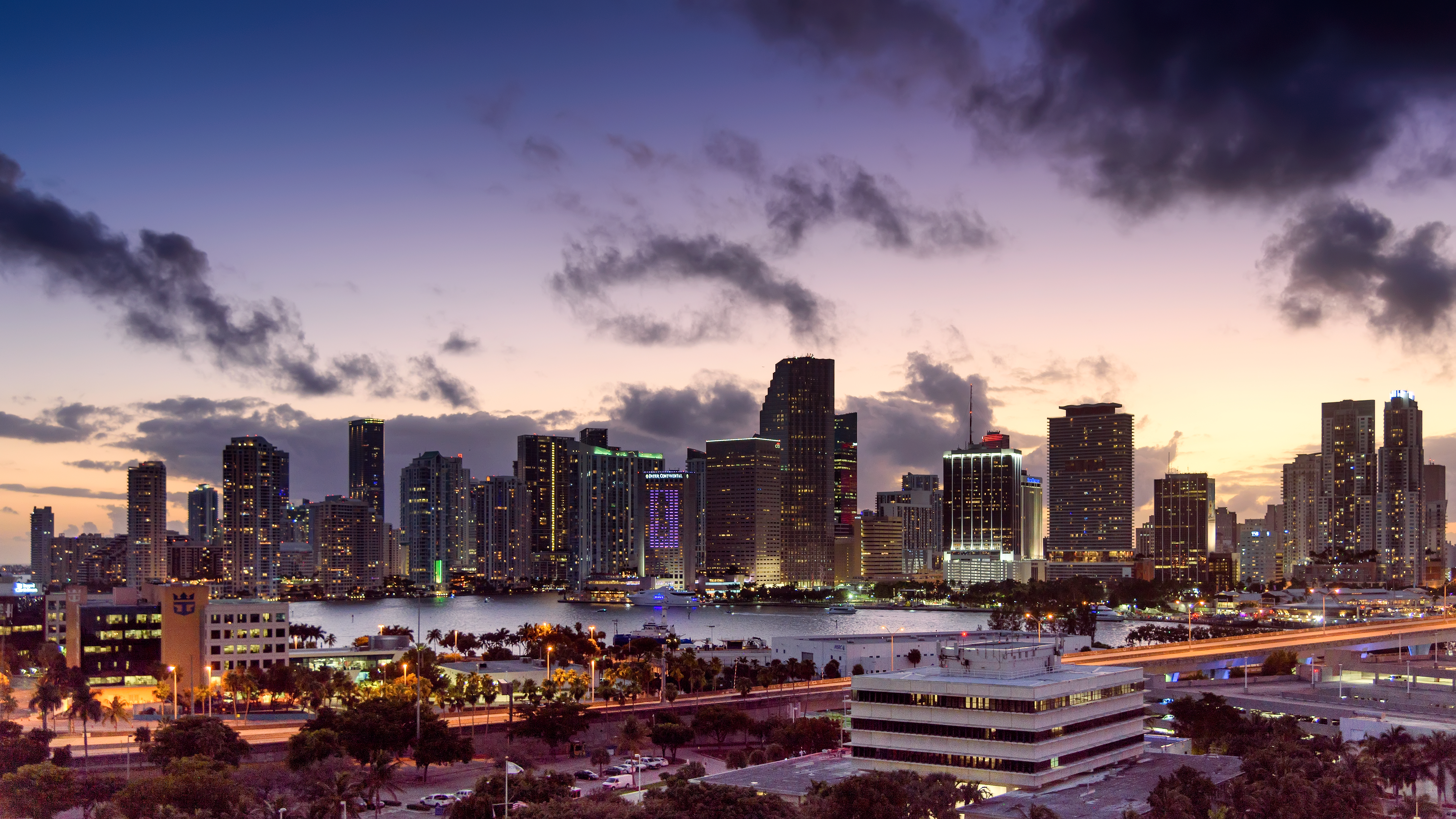
- The Miami skyline as seen from Watson Island
- Tallest building: Cipriani Residences Miami (2028)
- Tallest building height: 950 ft (290 m)
- First 150 m+ building: One Biscayne Tower (1973)

Number of tall buildings (2026)
- Taller than 100 m (328 ft): 152
- Taller than 150 m (492 ft): 73 + 9 T/O (Note: Topped-out)
- Taller than 200 m (656 ft): 10 + 3 T/O

Number of tall buildings — feet
- Taller than 300 ft (91.4 m): 166

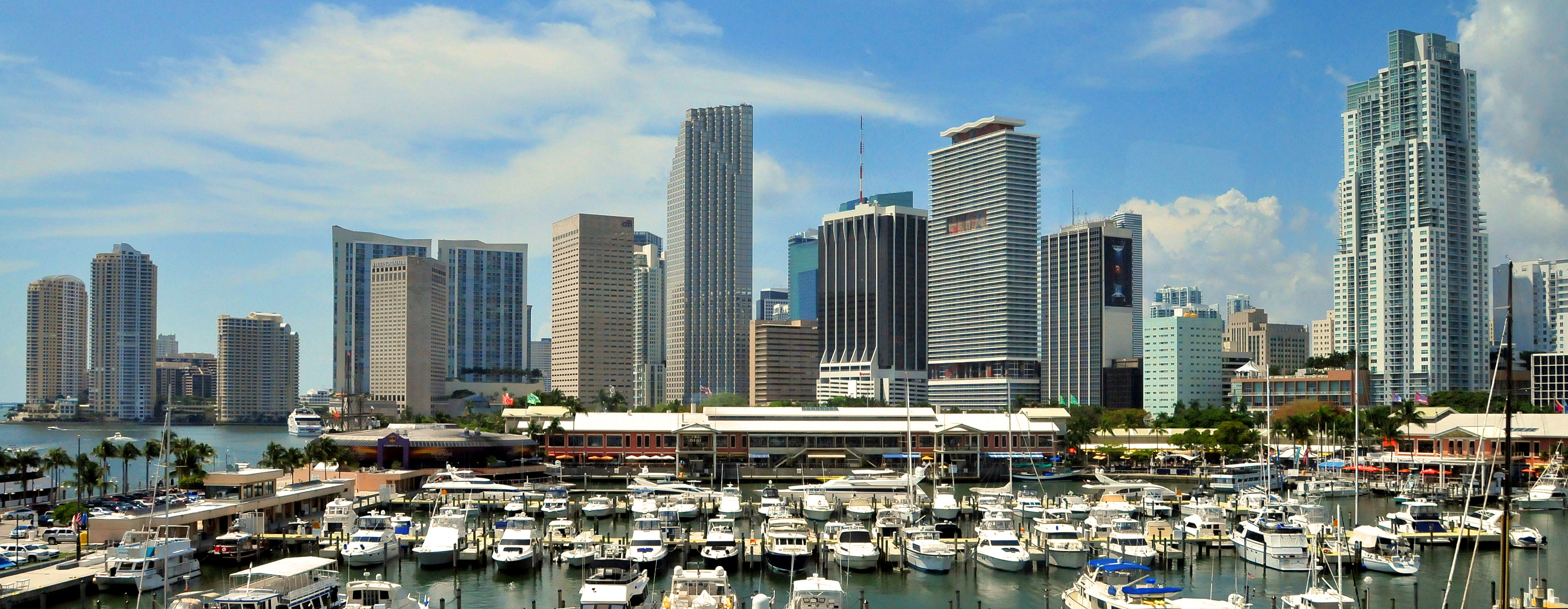
The Miami Central Business District skyline in 2013

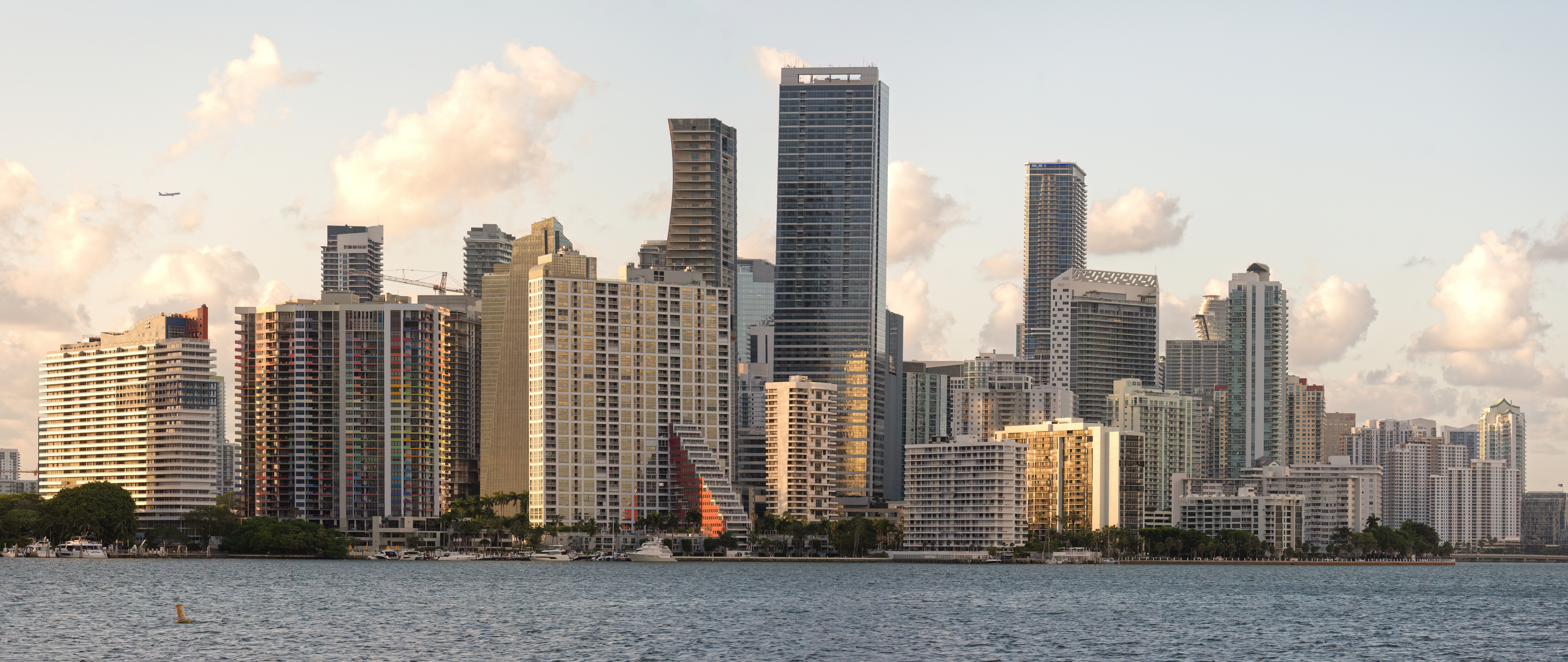
The Brickell skyline in 2025

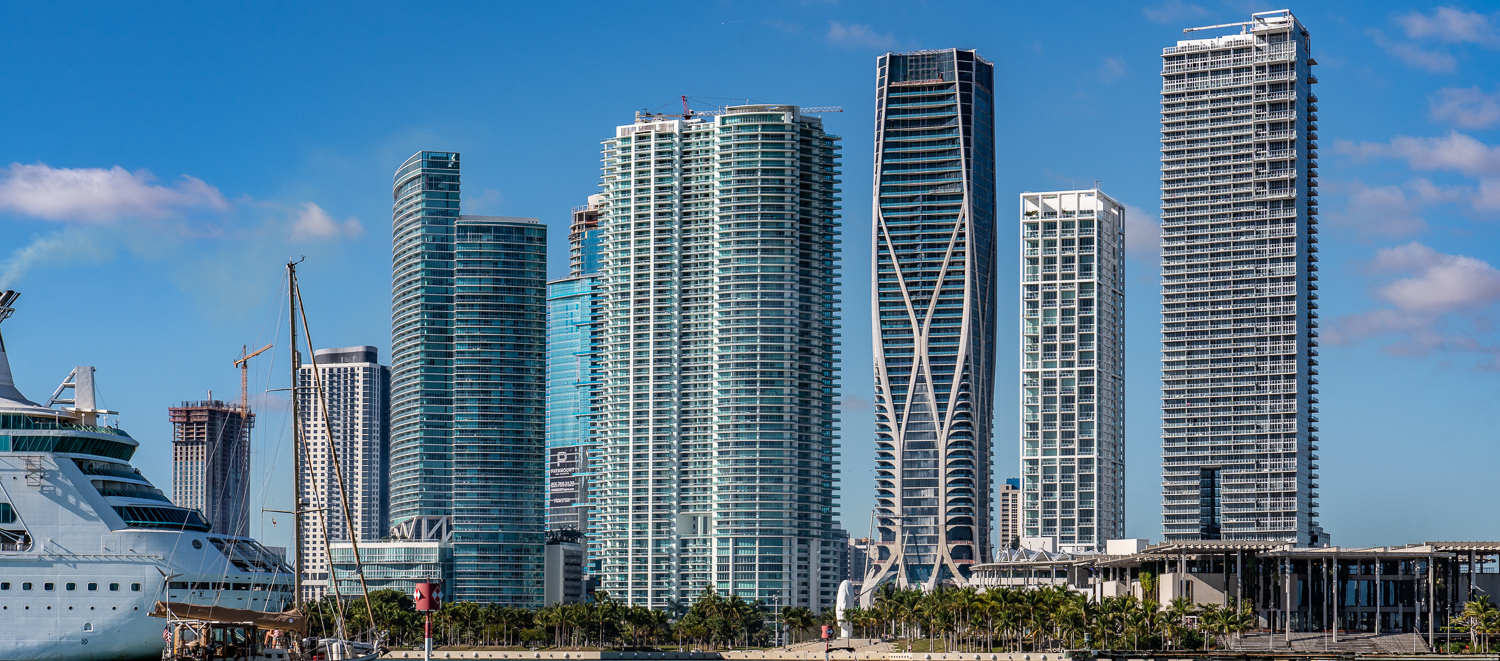
The Park West skyline in 2019

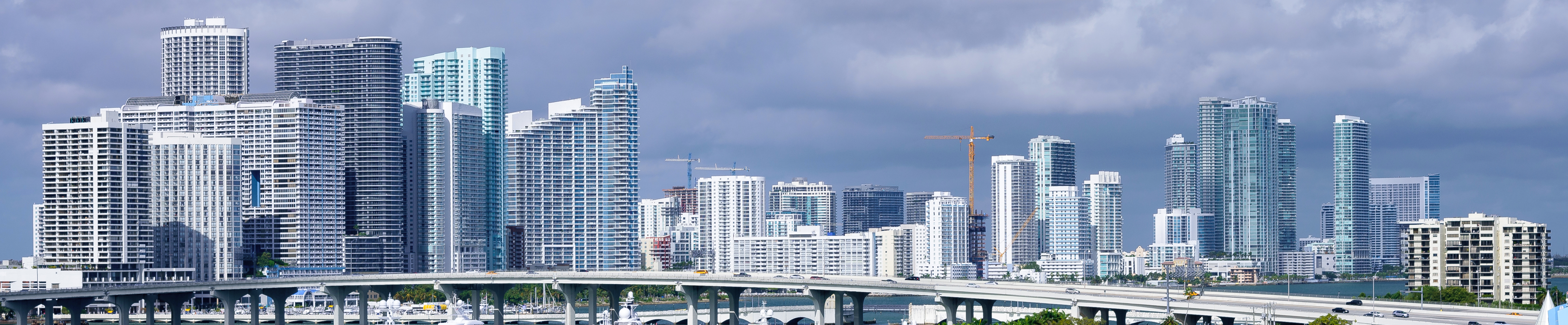
The Arts & Entertainment District and Edgewater skylines in 2019

Miami, a major city and the second-most populous city in the U.S. state of Florida, has over 400 high-rises, 73 of which are taller than 492 feet (150 m) as of 2026, with nine more that are topped out. The tallest completed building in the city is the 85-story Panorama Tower, completed in 2017, which rises 868 feet (265 m) in Miami's Brickell district. Cipriani Residences Miami, at 950 ft (290 m) tall, topped out in 2026 and is set to be completed in 2028. The top ten tallest buildings in Florida are located in Miami, and the top twenty are all in the city's metropolitan area. Miami has the third-largest skyline in the United States, after New York City and Chicago, and the fourth largest in North America, behind Toronto.

The first significant tall building in Miami is considered to be the six-story Burdine's Department Store, built in 1912, while the 17-story, Mediterranean Revival Freedom Tower, completed in 1925, is the city's best-known early skyscraper. For much of the 20th century, Miami had a relatively modest skyline compared to other major American cities. Beginning in the mid-1990s, Miami underwent a large residential high-rise boom that transformed its skyline, and expanded it to the Brickell and Edgewater neighborhoods. Development accelerated in the mid-2000s, until the Great Recession brought an end to the boom. The skyscraper boom resumed in the mid-2010s, owing to the city's continued population growth and investment, with Miami overtaking Houston as the city with the largest skyline in the southern United States, and has continued into the 2020s.

The rate of construction in Miami has been cited as an example of Manhattanization. Of the over 82 completed and topped out skyscrapers taller than 492 ft (150 m) in Miami, only five—less than one twelfth—were built before 2000. Miami is among the fastest-growing skylines in the United States and in North America. Due to the proximity and alignment of the runways of Miami International Airport, there is a height limit of 1,049 feet (320 m) above sea level in the city. The under construction Waldorf Astoria Miami will meet this limit when it is completed in 2028. The 100-story hotel is one of several supertall skyscrapers, buildings taller than 984 ft (300 m), that are approved in Miami, which are all bounded by the limit.

The city's main skyline is located in Greater Downtown Miami which runs north to south along the city's coast on Biscayne Bay, originating from the Central Business District along the Miami River and extending to Brickell in the south, and northwards to the Park West, Arts & Entertainment, and Edgewater districts. It also includes the small triangular island of Brickell Key, just off the coast from Brickell. The skyline is mostly bound to the west by Interstate 95. Unlike many American cities, Miami's skyline is dominated by residential, hotel, and mixed-use towers. Another cluster of high-rises sits in Coconut Grove, southwest of downtown. Several high-rise clusters have risen throughout the metropolitan area, notably around Douglas Road station, and in the nearby cities of Coral Gables, Dadeland, Pompano Beach, Fort Lauderdale, West Palm Beach, Hallandale Beach, Hollywood, Dania Beach, Bal Harbour, North Bay Village, Miami Beach, North Miami Beach, North Miami, Aventura and Sunny Isles Beach, the latter of which has 17 skyscrapers taller than 492 ft (150 m) itself.

== History ==
Number of buildings by height in Miami by the end of each year, based on the information in this article. Click on the legend to toggle a specific height on or off. View chart definition.

=== 20th century–2000s ===
Miami's skyscraper history began in 1912 with the six story Burdine's Department Store, becoming the first skyscraper in Miami. The McAllister Hotel later opened on December 31, 1919, becoming the largest building in Miami located at Flagler Street and Biscayne Blvd, holding the title of tallest building until 1925. The Freedom Tower, built in 1925, is Miami's best-known early skyscraper and remains an icon of the city. From the mid-1990s through the late 2000s, Miami went through the largest building boom in the city's history. In what was dubbed a "Manhattanization wave", there were nearly 60 structures proposed, approved or under construction in the city that were planned to rise over 492 feet (150 m) in height. As a result of the construction boom, only two of the city's 25 tallest buildings were completed before the year 2000, and the city has the third-largest skyline in the United States, generally ranking only behind New York City and Chicago.

The boom, however, ended abruptly around 2008 when the real estate market crashed and the late-2000s recession began. By 2011 the market began to return, with new office and condominium projects such as Brickell House announced for construction beginning in 2012. This was followed by a second boom that is currently active as of January 2019. This second boom has more proposed towers for the region than were built in the first boom from 2003 to 2010. Only 10 buildings out of 80 on the list were built before 2000, and only 18 were built before 2005.

=== 2010s–present ===
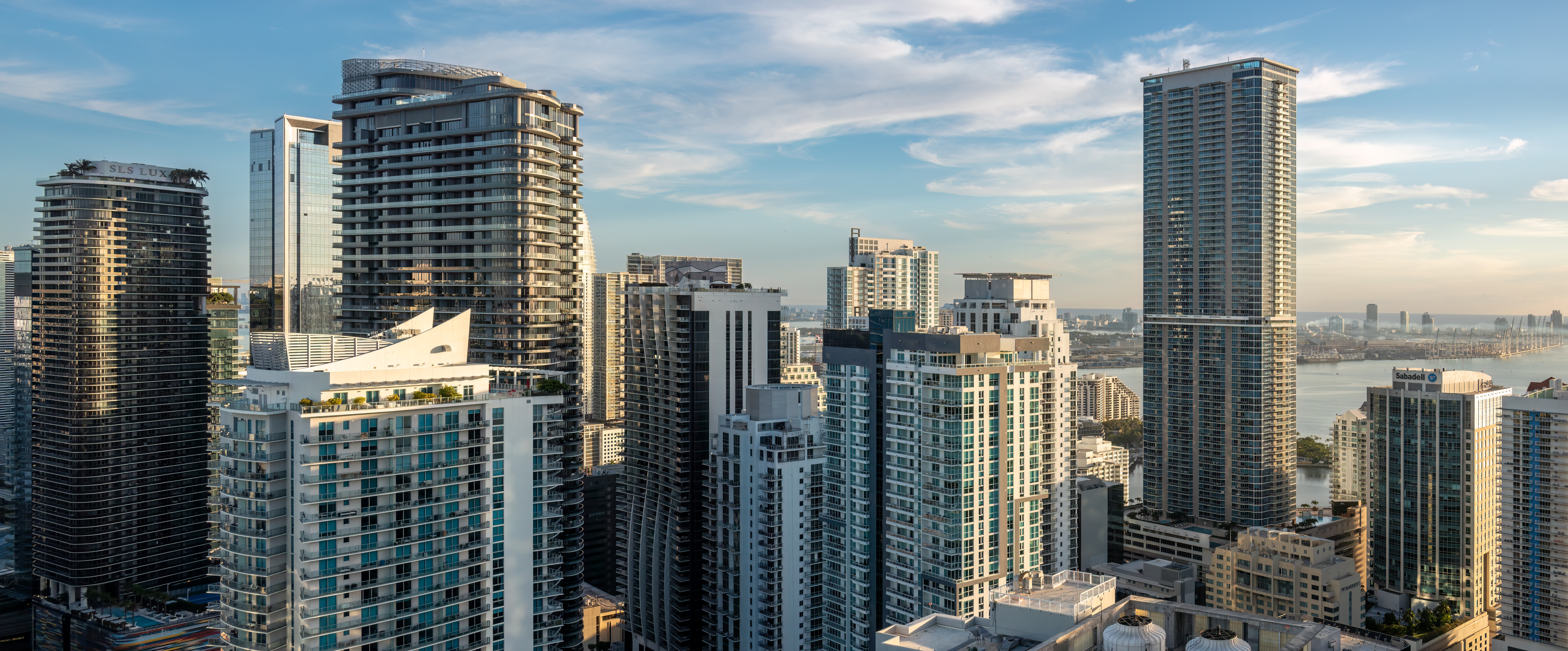
Residential and office high-rises in Brickell with the Panorama Tower at the right

The tallest completed structure is Panorama Tower in Brickell. It reached the height taller than any other building in Miami in August 2017. The auger cast pile deep foundation system for Panorama Tower was installed by HJ Foundation, a subsidiary of Keller Group. Currently under construction are three buildings that are estimated to surpass the Panorama Tower upon completion: Waldorf Astoria Miami, Cipriani Residences Miami, and Okan Tower.

Additionally, the tallest active proposals include One Bayfront Plaza (OBP) and One Brickell City Centre (OBCC), both of which may rise over 1,000 feet (305 m). One Bayfront Plaza is a mixed-use building proposed for 100 South Biscayne Boulevard, approved for construction since 2007, and scheduled to be completed as early as 2018. Since then, it has gone through several design changes and does not have a reliable construction date. By the end of 2016, there were about ten proposals for supertall buildings in downtown and Brickell. In addition to OBCC and OPB, these included The Towers by Foster + Partners, One MiamiCentral, World Trade Center of the Americas, Skyrise (tower), as well as the more speculative Sky Plaza and One Fifth.

=== Tallest buildings ===
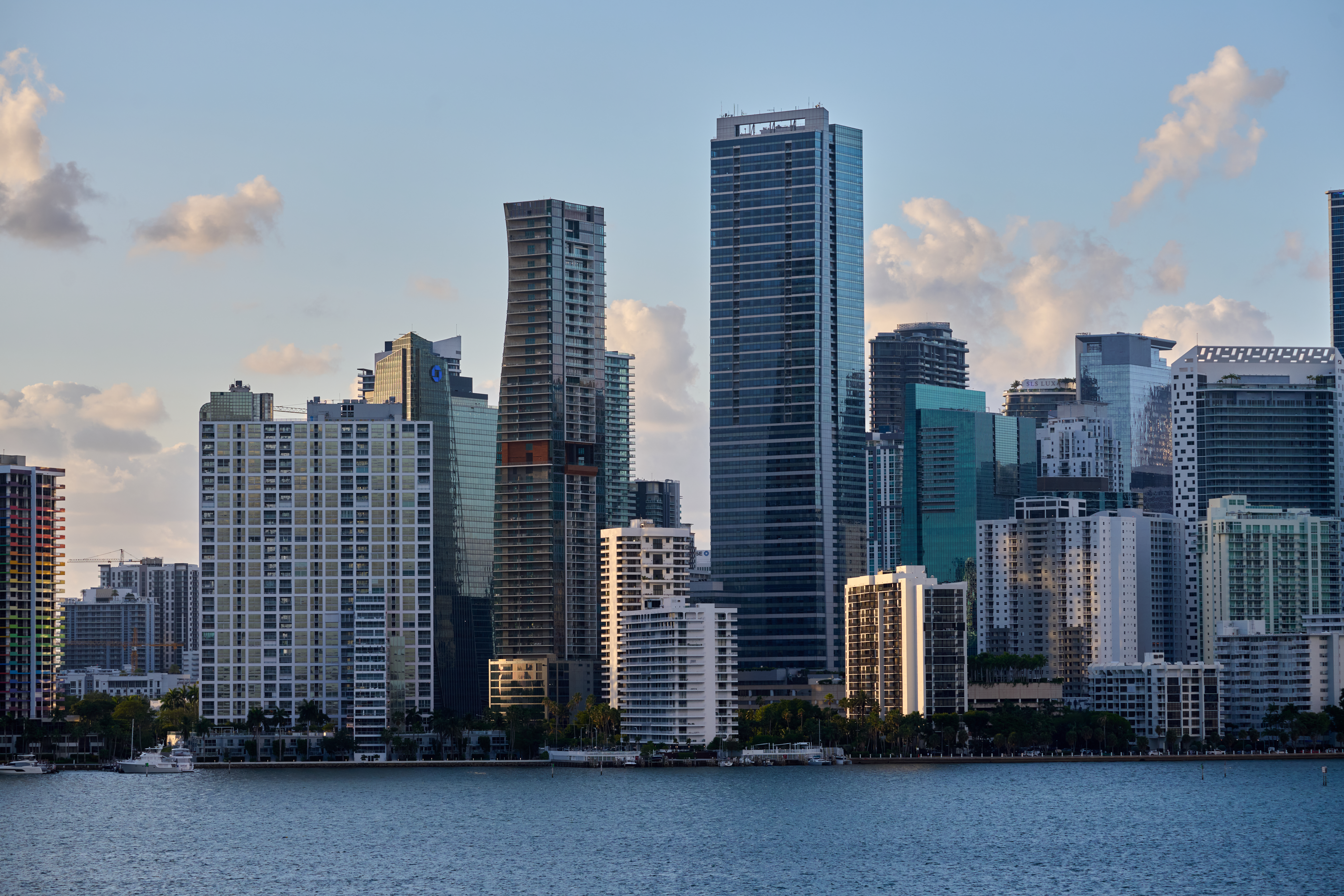
Portion of the Brickell skyline in 2025 with the Four Seasons Hotel Miami in the center

There have been several buildings in Miami that have held the title as the tallest building in the city. While the 5-story Burdine's Department Store was the first high-rise building in the city, the Freedom Tower is generally regarded as Miami's first skyscraper, when it was completed in 1925. The Dade County Courthouse was completed in 1928 and held the title as the tallest building in Miami for 44 years until the completion of One Biscayne Tower in 1972. Southeast Financial Center became the tallest building in 1984. From 2003 to 2008, and again in the late 2010s and early 2020s, the Manhattanization of the city led to a huge amount of new development. Several buildings were constructed, with the Four Seasons Hotel Miami overtaking the Southeast Financial Center when it was completed in 2003. In 2017, Panorama Tower overtook the Four Seasons as the tallest in the city and the state. In a second building boom from 2014 to 2017, many more skyscrapers in excess of 800 feet (240 m) were approved by the FAA, including several 1,000-foot (300 m) supertalls. Many of these were among the top ten tallest buildings in the city. In 2022, the Waldorf Astoria Miami began construction as the city's first supertall building, exceeding 1000 ft.

=== FAA height limits ===
Due to the proximity and alignment of the runways of Miami International Airport, the Federal Aviation Administration imposes strict height limits in the downtown Miami area. One Bayfront Plaza was for many years the tallest building ever to be approved for construction in the city, at the maximum FAA height limit of 1,049 feet (320 m), though several other buildings were approved at similar heights since then. It was later reduced and is expected to rise 1,010 feet (308 m), with 80 floors. It also has the distinction of being the first skyscraper over 1,000 feet (305 m), known as a "supertall", to be approved in Miami. Several other buildings have been proposed to rise over 1,000 feet (305 m), including One Brickell City Centre, but have been reduced by the FAA.

Approvals for comparably tall buildings in Miami are very rare due to the proximity of Miami International Airport (MIA). The main runways of MIA align planes taking off and landing directly over the greater downtown area, and for this reason the Federal Aviation Administration sets precise height limits for construction in Downtown Miami. The fate of high rise construction in Miami was greatly threatened by a "One Engine Inoperative" (OEI) policy proposed by the FAA in 2014. This proposal would drastically reduce the maximum permitted height of structures around 388 airports in the country, even causing existing structures to be modified. In the end, the FAA did not go forward with the extreme limitations and even began giving quicker approvals to buildings with heights up to 1,049 feet (320 m), leading to many proposed and approved supertall projects.

== Cityscape ==
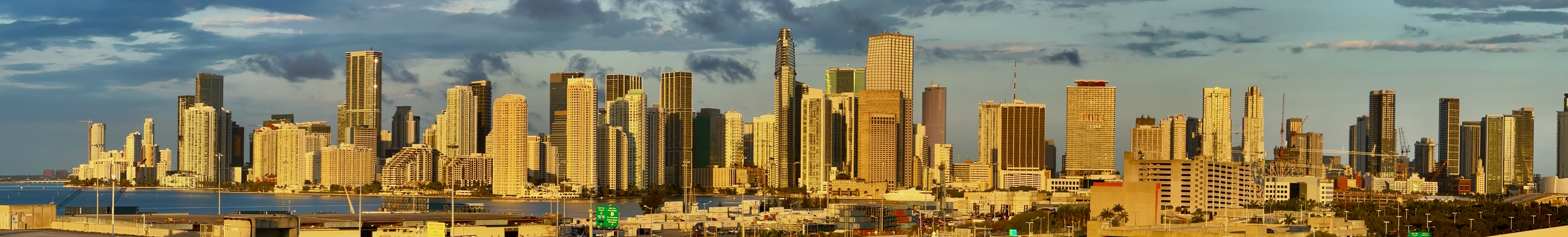
Panorama of the Miami skyline at sunrise in 2025. From left to right, the skyline consists of the skyscrapers and high-rises found in the Brickell, the Central Business District, and Park West districts.

== Map of tallest buildings ==
This map shows the location of skyscrapers taller than 492 feet (150 m) in Miami. Each marker is colored by the decade of the skyscraper's completion.

Buildings taller than 492 ft (150 m) in Miami.
- 1970s
- 1980s
- 1990s
- 2000s
- 2010s
- 2020s
1 Cipriani Residences Miami
2 Panorama Tower
3 Baccarat Residences
4 Aston Martin Residences
5 Four Seasons Hotel Miami
6 Southeast Financial Center
7 830 Brickell
8 Marquis Miami
9 One Thousand Museum
10 Paramount Miami Worldcenter
11 E11even Hotel and Residences
12 E11even Residences Beyond
13 Brickell Flatiron
14 Wells Fargo Center
15 900 Biscayne Bay
16 Villa Miami
17 Missoni Baia
18 Elysee
19 The River District First Tower
20 Echo Brickell
21 Aria Reserve North Tower
22 Aria Reserve South Tower
23 Casa Bella
24 Mint at Riverfront
25 Infinity at Brickell
26 The St. Regis Residences, Miami
27 Miami Tower
28 Marinablue
29 Una Residences
30 Plaza on Brickell Tower I
31 Epic Residences & Hotel
32 One Paraíso
33 SLS Brickell
34 SLS Lux
35 Natiivo
36 Icon Brickell North Tower
37 Icon Brickell South Tower
38 The Elser Hotel & Residences
39 Downtown 6th
40 Lofty Brickell
41 The Standard Residences
42 Downtown 1st
43 Miami World Towers 1
44 Paramount Bay at Edgewater Square
45 50 Biscayne
46 Quantum on the Bay South Tower
47 Solitair Brickell
48 Biscayne Beach
49 Brickell Heights East Tower
50 1010 Brickell
51 ParaisoBay
52 GranParaiso
53 Opera Tower
54 W Miami Hotel Tower
55 Vizcayne North Tower
56 Vizcayne South Tower
57 Avant on Met Square
58 Quantum on the Bay North Tower
59 Aria On The Bay
60 Ten Museum Park
61 Brickell Heights West Tower
62 Jade at Brickell Bay
63 Plaza on Brickell Tower II
64 2600 Biscayne
65 Santa Maria
66 Rise
67 EAST Miami
68 The Ivy
69 Stephen P. Clark Gov. Center
70 Brickell House
71 Parkline South
72 Reach
73 JW Marriott Marquis Miami
74 Wind
75 1450 Brickell
76 Paraiso Bayviews
77 Hamilton House
78 Downtown 5th East
79 Downtown 5th West
80 Avenue Brickell Tower
81 Bezel at Miami Worldcenter
82 One Biscayne Tower

== Tallest buildings ==
This lists ranks the tallest buildings in Miami that stand at least 492 ft (150 m) tall as of 2026, based on standard height measurement. This includes spires and architectural details but does not include antenna masts.^{[A]} Due to strict zoning in the City of Miami and the FAA approval needed for each building, none of the tallest buildings in Miami have a defined spire. Buildings tied in height are sorted by year of completion with earlier buildings ranked first, and then alphabetically.

Was the tallest building in Miami upon completion
Architecturally topped out but not yet completed

Rank	Name	Image	Location	Height ft (m)	Floors	Year	Purpose	Notes
1	Cipriani Residences Miami	–	Brickell 25°45′36″N 80°11′40″W	950 (289.5)	80	2028	Residential	Construction had started after the site's groundbreaking ceremony took place on February 6, 2024. On site of former Capital at Brickell or CCCC Miami site. Topped out in July 2026 as the tallest building in Miami and Florida.
2	Panorama Tower		Brickell 25°45′47″N 80°11′25″W	868 (264.6)	85	2017	Mixed-use	Tallest building in Miami and Florida from 2017 to 2026, approximately 70th-tallest in the United States. Tallest building in Miami and Florida completed in the 2010s. Mixed use residential, office, and hotel building.
3	Baccarat Residences	–	Brickell 25°46′09″N 80°11′26″W	835 (254.5)	75	2028	Residential	Archaeologists discovered human remains and artifacts at the site in 2021. Construction on the site has been paused so archaeologists can conduct a dig. Construction had commenced on October 30, 2023, after a groundbreaking ceremony took place on the site. Construction topped out in Q4 2026.
4	Aston Martin Residences		Downtown 25°46′14″N 80°11′18″W	821 (250.2)	66	2022	Residential	Topped out in December 2021, as the tallest residential building south of New York City. Tallest building in Miami and Florida completed in the 2020s so far.
5	Four Seasons Hotel Miami		Brickell 25°45′33″N 80°11′31″W	789 (240.4)	70	2003	Mixed-use	Had been the tallest building in Miami and Florida from 2003 until 2017. Tallest building completed in Miami and Florida in the 2000s. Mixed-use residential, office, and hotel building.
6	Southeast Financial Center		Downtown 25°46′20″N 80°11′16″W	764 (232.8)	55	1984	Office	Tallest all-office building in Miami and Florida; tallest building completed in Miami and Florida in the 1980s.
7	830 Brickell		Brickell 25°45′58″N 80°11′32″W	724 (220.7)	57	2024	Office	649,000 square foot office tower. Second tallest all-office building in Miami.
8	One Thousand Museum		Park West 25°47′03″N 80°11′24″W	709 (216)	60	2019	Residential	
9	Marquis Miami		Park West 25°47′07″N 80°11′24″W	702 (214)	63	2009	Mixed-use	Mixed-use residential and hotel building
10	Paramount Miami Worldcenter		Park West 25°46′57″N 80°11′31″W	699 (213.1)	60	2019	Residential	
11	E11even Hotel and Residences	–	Park West 25°47′04″N 80°11′37″W	699 (213)	65	2026	Mixed-use	The tower broke ground on November 11, 2021, and topped off in early 2025.
12	E11even Residences Beyond	–	Park West 25°47′05″N 80°11′34″W	699 (213)	65	2026	Mixed-use	Broke ground in summer of 2023. Topped out in April 2026.
13	Brickell Flatiron		Brickell 25°45′50″N 80°11′35″W	698 (212.9)	64	2019	Residential	Residential tower with 549 condominiums and 3,716 square meters of ground floor retail. Site is located on the corner of South Miami Avenue and Brickell Plaza. Typical of Miami residential construction, financing will use the Latin American finance method. Construction began in March 2016.
14	Wells Fargo Center		Downtown 25°46′17″N 80°11′23″W	655 (199.5)	47	2010	Office	Formerly known as Met 2 Financial Center.
15	900 Biscayne Bay		Park West 25°47′00″N 80°11′24″W	650 (198)	63	2008	Residential	Was the tallest all-residential skyscraper in Miami and Florida until 2019.
16	Villa Miami	–	Edgewater 25°48′15″N 80°11′08″W	650 (198)	56	2027	Residential	One Thousand Group is the developer. Topped out in October 2026.
17	Missoni Baia	–	Edgewater 25°48′07″N 80°11′09″W	649 (197.8)	57	2023	Residential	Construction began in October 2017. Topped out in June 2021.
18	Elysee		Edgewater 25°47′56″N 80°11′09″W	644 (196.3)	57	2021	Residential	
19	The River District First Tower	–	Brickell 25°46′08″N 80°11′56″W	640 (195)	54	2025	Residential	Also known as Miami River Phase 1. Topped off in August 2023.
20	Echo Brickell		Brickell 25°45′29″N 80°11′33″W	637 (194.2)	57	2017	Residential	
21	Aria Reserve North Tower	–	Edgewater 25°48′01″N 80°11′08″W	637 (194.2)	62	2026	Residential	Tallest residential waterfront twin towers in the United States. Topped off in July 2025.
22	Aria Reserve South Tower	–	Edgewater 25°47′59″N 80°11′08″W	637 (194.2)	60	2025	Residential	The Tallest Residential Waterfront Dual Towers in the United States. Topped off in April 2024.
23	Casa Bella	–	Arts & Entertainment District 25°47′21″N 80°11′23″W	637 (194)	57	2026	Residential	The Related group is the developer. Topped off in July 2025 as the tallest building in the Arts & Entertainment District. Completed in July 2026.
24	Mint at Riverfront		Downtown 25°46′10″N 80°11′43″W	631 (192.3)	55	2009	Residential	
25	Infinity at Brickell		Brickell 25°45′40″N 80°11′40″W	630 (192)	52	2008	Mixed-use	Mixed-use residential and office building.
26	The St. Regis Residences, Miami	–	Brickell 25°45′16″N 80°11′43″W	630 (192)	50	2027	Residential	
27	Miami Tower		Downtown 25°46′20″N 80°11′30″W	625 (190.5)	47	1987	Office	Designed by I.M. Pei & Partners. Formerly known as CenTrust Tower and Bank of America Tower. The building contains the Knight Center Metromover station. 216 ultra-modern LED fixtures placed on the setbacks and rooftops of neighboring blocks light the tower in multicolored displays.
28	Marinablue		Park West 25°46′57″N 80°11′24″W	615 (187.5)	57	2007	Residential	
29	Una Residences	–	Brickell 25°44′58″N 80°12′04″W	613 (186.8)	47	2025	Residential	
30	Plaza on Brickell Tower I		Brickell 25°45′54″N 80°11′25″W	610 (185.9)	56	2007	Residential	
31	Epic Residences & Hotel		Downtown 25°46′14″N 80°11′22″W	601 (183.2)	54	2009	Mixed-use	
32	One Paraíso	–	Edgewater 25°48′26″N 80°11′08″W	601 (183.2)	53	2018	Residential	Part of Paraiso Bay complex. Approved in July 2013. This twin residential tower project is located on NE 31st Street on the Biscayne Bay waterfront.
33	SLS Brickell		Brickell 25°45′41″N 80°11′37″W	599 (182.6)	52	2016	Mixed-use	Mixed-use residential and hotel building.
34	SLS Lux		Brickell 25°45′58″N 80°11′35″W	595 (181.4)	57	2018	Residential	This is the third tower in the Brickell Heights development project.
35	Natiivo		Downtown 25°46′51″N 80°11′30″W	589 (179.4)	51	2023	Residential	Includes serviced apartments. Topped out in November 2022. Also known as 601 Miami.
36	Icon Brickell North Tower		Brickell 25°46′08″N 80°11′19″W	586 (178.6)	58	2008	Residential	Part of the Icon Brickell development.
37	Icon Brickell South Tower		Brickell 25°46′06″N 80°11′19″W	586 (178.6)	58	2008	Residential	Part of the Icon Brickell development.
38	Miami World Tower		Park West 25°46′53″N 80°11′33″W	579 (176)	53	2024	Residential	
39	Downtown 6th	–	Downtown 25°46′47″N 80°11′34″W	574 (175)	58	2026	Residential	Topped out in early 2026.
40	Lofty Brickell	–	Brickell 25°46′06″N 80°11′43″W	574 (175)	44	2026	Residential	Project broke ground on January 31, 2022. Topped off in January 2026 with The Standard Residences.
41	The Standard Residences	–	Brickell 25°46′03″N 80°11′43″W	574 (175)	45	2026	Residential	Constructed alongside Lofty Brickell. Topped off in January 2026 with Lofty Brickell.
42	The Elser Hotel & Residences		Downtown 25°46′44″N 80°11′21″W	573 (174.7)	49	2022	Mixed-use	Mixed-use residential and hotel building.
43	Downtown 1st		Downtown 25°46′23″N 80°11′39″W	560 (170.7)	60	2023	Residential	
44	Paramount Bay at Edgewater Square		Edgewater 25°47′48″N 80°11′16″W	555 (169.1)	47	2009	Residential	Designed by Arquitectonica Architects, Creative Vision by Lenny Kravitz for Kravitz Design Inc.
45	50 Biscayne		Downtown 25°46′30″N 80°11′17″W	554 (168.9)	55	2007	Mixed-use	Mixed-use residential and hotel building.
46	Quantum on the Bay South Tower		Arts & Entertainment District 25°47′41″N 80°11′13″W	554 (168.9)	51	2008	Mixed-use	Mixed-use residential and office building.
47	Solitair Brickell		Brickell 25°45′58″N 80°11′40″W	550 (167.7)	50	2017	Residential	438-unit residential condominium tower. The tower is being built where the parking garage of the Brickell Bayview Center office building had been located. Construction began in July 2015.
48	Biscayne Beach		Edgewater 25°48′18″N 80°11′09″W	550 (167.7)	51	2016	Residential	Residential apartment tower began construction in May 2014. Tower will have 399 units and a private "beach club." Topped of summer 2016.
49	Brickell Heights East Tower		Brickell 25°45′56″N 80°11′37″W	549 (167.3)	52	2017	Residential	Also known as Brickell Heights North Tower. Formerly announced in 2006 as Premiere Towers. The project was cancelled by the Great Recession and re-announced in October 2013 as a twin 690 unit residential tower. Construction began in June 2014.
50	1010 Brickell		Brickell 25°45′51″N 80°11′32″W	548 (167)	50	2017	Residential	352-unit residential condominium tower. The tower is to be built on the current parking garage of the 1010 Brickell office building. The tower began construction with the demolition of the existing parking garage in Spring 2014.
51	ParaisoBay		Edgewater 25°48′25″N 80°11′11″W	548 (167)	55	2017	Residential	Part of the Paraiso Bay complex.
52	GranParaiso		Edgewater 25°48′22″N 80°11′12″W	548 (167)	55	2018	Residential	Announced in early 2013. Part of the Paraiso Bay complex. Approved in July 2013. This twin residential tower project is located on NE 31st Street on the Biscayne Bay waterfront. Site work construction began June 2014.
53	Opera Tower		Arts & Entertainment District 25°47′33″N 80°11′14″W	543 (165.5)	56	2007	Residential	
54	W Miami Hotel Tower		Brickell 25°46′07″N 80°11′23″W	542 (165.2)	50	2009	Mixed-use	Third tower of the Icon Brickell development. Formerly known as Viceroy.
55	Vizcayne North Tower		Downtown 25°46′37″N 80°11′19″W	538 (164)	50	2008	Residential	
56	Vizcayne South Tower		Downtown 25°46′35″N 80°11′21″W	538 (164)	49	2008	Residential	
57	Avant on Met Square	–	Downtown 25°46′18″N 80°11′18″W	538 (164)	46	2018	Residential	391-unit rental apartment tower. Contains restaurant space and 1,778-seat movie theatre. Also contain a Tequesta Indian display after artifacts and structures of the tribe were unearthed at the site. Construction began in July 2015.
58	Quantum on the Bay North Tower		Arts & Entertainment District 25°47′41″N 80°11′15″W	536 (163.4)	44	2008	MIxed-use	Mixed-use residential and office tower.
59	Aria On The Bay		Arts & Entertainment District 25°47′37″N 80°11′13″W	535 (163)	50	2017	Residential	647 Unit condo tower by Melo Group. Construction began in April 2015.
60	Ten Museum Park		Park West 25°47′05″N 80°11′24″W	530 (161.5)	50	2007	Residential	
61	Brickell Heights West Tower		Brickell 25°45′56″N 80°11′40″W	529 (161.2)	52	2017	Residential	Also known as Brickell Heights South Tower. Formerly announced in 2006 as Premiere Towers. The project was cancelled by the Great Recession and re-announced in October 2013 as a twin 690 unit residential tower. Construction began in June 2014 and topped out fall 2016.
62	Jade at Brickell Bay		Brickell 25°45′37″N 80°11′22″W	528 (160.9)	49	2004	Residential	
63	Plaza on Brickell Tower II		Brickell 25°45′53″N 80°11′27″W	524.9 (160.0)	48	2007	Residential	
64	2600 Biscayne	–	Edgewater 25°48′07″N 80°11′23″W	521 (158.8)	41	2026	Mixed-use	Topped out in September 2025. Completed in October 2026. Also known as Neo Edgewater.
65	Santa Maria		Brickell 25°45′20″N 80°11′42″W	520 (158.5)	51	1997	Residential	Tallest building completed in Miami in the 1990s.
66	Rise		Brickell 25°46′01″N 80°11′41″W	520 (158.5)	45	2016	Residential	Part of the Brickell City Centre project, which also includes construction of 520,000 square ft (48,310 square m) of retail, and two office towers with a height of 262 ft (80 m) each.
67	EAST Miami		Brickell 25°46′00″N 80°11′34″W	516 (157.3)	44	2015	Mixed-use	Part of the Brickell City Centre project.
68	The Ivy		Downtown 25°46′13″N 80°11′43″W	512 (156.2)	45	2008	Residential	
69	Stephen P. Clark Government Center		Downtown 25°46′32″N 80°11′48″W	510 (155.4)	28	1985	Office	Also known as Government Center and Miami-Dade Center
70	Brickell House		Brickell 25°45′37″N 80°11′25″W	509 (155)	48	2014	Residential	Tallest building completed in Miami in the first half of the 2010s.
71	Parkline South	–	Downtown 25°46′42″N 80°11′45″W	506 (154.2)	33	2019	Residential	Part of the MiamiCentral Complex.
72	Reach		Brickell 25°46′04″N 80°11′33″W	503 (153.3)	44	2016	Residential	Part of the Brickell City Centre project.
73	JW Marriott Marquis Miami		Downtown 25°46′17″N 80°11′21″W	502 (153.1)	41	2010	Hotel	Also known as the Met 2 Marriott Marquis. Connected to the Wells Fargo Center.
74	Wind		Downtown 25°46′14″N 80°11′39″W	501 (152.7)	41	2008	Residential	
75	1450 Brickell		Brickell 25°45′31″N 80°11′35″W	500 (152.5)	34	2010	Office	Formerly known as Park Place at Brickell II. 1450 Brickell has been certified gold by The Leadership in Energy and Environmental Design (LEED) Green Building Rating System.
76	Paraiso Bayviews	–	Edgewater 25°48′25″N 80°11′15″W	500 (152.4)	44	2018	Residential	Construction began in 2015. Part of the Paraiso Bay complex.
77	Hamilton House	–	Edgewater 25°48′30″N 80°11′08″W	497 (151.4)	38	2026	Residential	
78	Downtown 5th East	–	Downtown 25°46′45″N 80°11′34″W	495 (151)	52	2021	Residential	
79	Downtown 5th West	–	Downtown 25°46′45″N 80°11′36″W	495 (151)	52	2021	Residential	
80	Avenue Brickell Tower		Brickell 25°45′47″N 80°11′31″W	495 (150.9)	47	2007	Residential	
81	Bezel at Miami Worldcenter		Park West 25°46′51″N 80°11′27″W	494 (150.6)	42	2021	Residential	Also known as LUMA at Miami Worldcenter
82	One Biscayne Tower		Downtown 25°46′26″N 80°11′17″W	492 (150.0)	39	1973	Office	Tallest building built in Miami in the 1970s. Surpassed as tallest by Wachovia Financial Center (now Southeast Financial Center) in 1984.

=== Tallest buildings by neighborhood ===
This lists the tallest building in each neighborhood, district, or sub-district of Miami. Note that all buildings over 400 feet (120 m) are within the Greater Downtown area between the Julia Tuttle Causeway and Rickenbacker Causeway, east of Interstate 95. The "Year" column indicates the year in which a building was completed or topped-out for still under construction or stalled buildings. A dash "–" indicates a building's exact height is unknown.

District	Name	Height ft (m)	Floors	Year	Notes
Brickell	Cipriani Residences Miami	950 (290)	80	2028	
Central Business District (Downtown)	Aston Martin Residences	821 (250)	66	2022	
Park West	One Thousand Museum	709 (216)	62	2018	
Edgewater	Villa Miami	650 (198)	56	2027	
Arts & Entertainment District	Casa Bella	637 (194)	57	2025	
Brickell Key	Asia	483 (147)	36	2008	
Wynwood	Hyde Midtown	372 (113)	31	2017	
Coconut Grove	Grovenor House	341 (104)	33	2006	
Allapattah	River Landing Residences	–	26	2021	

== Tallest under construction ==
This lists buildings that are currently under construction in Miami and are planned to rise at least 492 feet (150 m) as of 2026. Buildings that have already been topped out are moved to the main list. Table entries with dashes (—) indicate that information regarding expected building dates of completion has not yet been released. The year column indicates the estimated year of completion. Buildings on hold are not included.

Name	Location	Height ft (m)	Floors	Year	Notes
Waldorf Astoria Miami	Downtown	1,041 (317.3)	100	2028	Announced in 2015. It will be the tallest building in the State of Florida and one of the tallest in the Southern United States. Construction had commenced after the groundbreaking ceremony in October 2022.
Okan Tower	Downtown	903 (275.2)	70	2027	Will contain 149 condominiums and be one of Miami's tallest buildings when completed. Construction plans have resumed after being suspended due to the COVID-19 pandemic.
1428 Brickell	Brickell	861 (262)	71	2027	189-unit luxury building will also be the world's the first residential high-rise in the world partially powered by the sun, the developer says, with 500 photovoltaic-integrated windows
The Residences at Mandarin Oriental (South Tower)	Brickell	850 (259)	66	2030	Began deep soil mixing in August 2026, followed by foundation work starting in October 2026.
1401 Brickell by Santander	Brickell	764 (233)	50	2029	Broke ground in April 2026.
JEM Private Residences	Park West	700 (213.3)	67	2027	
Edge House Miami	Edgewater	637 (194)	57	2028	
700 N Miami Ave	Downtown	611 (186)	53	2029	

== Timeline of tallest buildings ==
Name	Image	Street address	Years as tallest	Height ft / m	Floors	Notes
Burdine's Department Store		22 E Flagler St	1912–1917	N/A	6	At the intersection of Flagler Street and Miami Avenue, the center of the Miami road grid.
Ralston Building^{[B]}		40 NE 1st Avenue	1917	88 (27)	8	This building was originally known as the Ralston Building, but has since been renamed the Carrion Jewelry Center.
McAllister Hotel		50 Biscayne Boulevard	1917–1925	120 (37)	10	Demolished in 1988. Currently the location of 50 Biscayne.
Freedom Tower		600 Biscayne Boulevard	1925–1928	256 (78)	17	Tallest building in Florida upon completion until surpassed in 1926 by the Biltmore Hotel in Coral Gables.
Dade County Courthouse		75 West Flagler Street	1928–1972	360 (110)	28	Tallest building in Florida from 1928 to 1967.
One Biscayne Tower		2 South Biscayne Boulevard	1972–1984	492 (150)	39	
Southeast Financial Center		200 South Biscayne Boulevard	1984–2003	764 (233)	55	Tallest building in Florida during the same period.
Four Seasons Hotel Miami		1441 Brickell Avenue	2003–2017	789 (240)	64	Tallest building in Florida during the same period.
Panorama Tower		1101 Brickell Avenue	2017–2026	868 (265)	85	Tallest building in Florida during the same period.
Cipriani Residences Miami		1420 South Miami Avenue	2026	940 (290)	80	Tallest building in Florida during the same period. Topped out in mid 2026. Eventually surpassed by Waldorf Astoria Miami in September of the same year, the Waldorf tower itself still under construction and not yet topped out.
Waldorf Astoria Miami		330 Biscayne Boulevard	2026–present	1,041 (317)	100	Tallest building in Florida since September 2026 when it surpassed the Cipriani Residences. Planned to top out in late 2026.

== See also ==
- List of tallest buildings in Florida
- List of tallest buildings in Fort Lauderdale
- List of tallest buildings in Jacksonville
- List of tallest buildings in Miami Beach
- List of tallest buildings in Orlando
- List of tallest buildings in Sunny Isles Beach
- List of tallest buildings in St. Petersburg
- List of tallest buildings in Tampa
- List of tallest buildings in Tallahassee
