= List of tallest buildings in Florida =

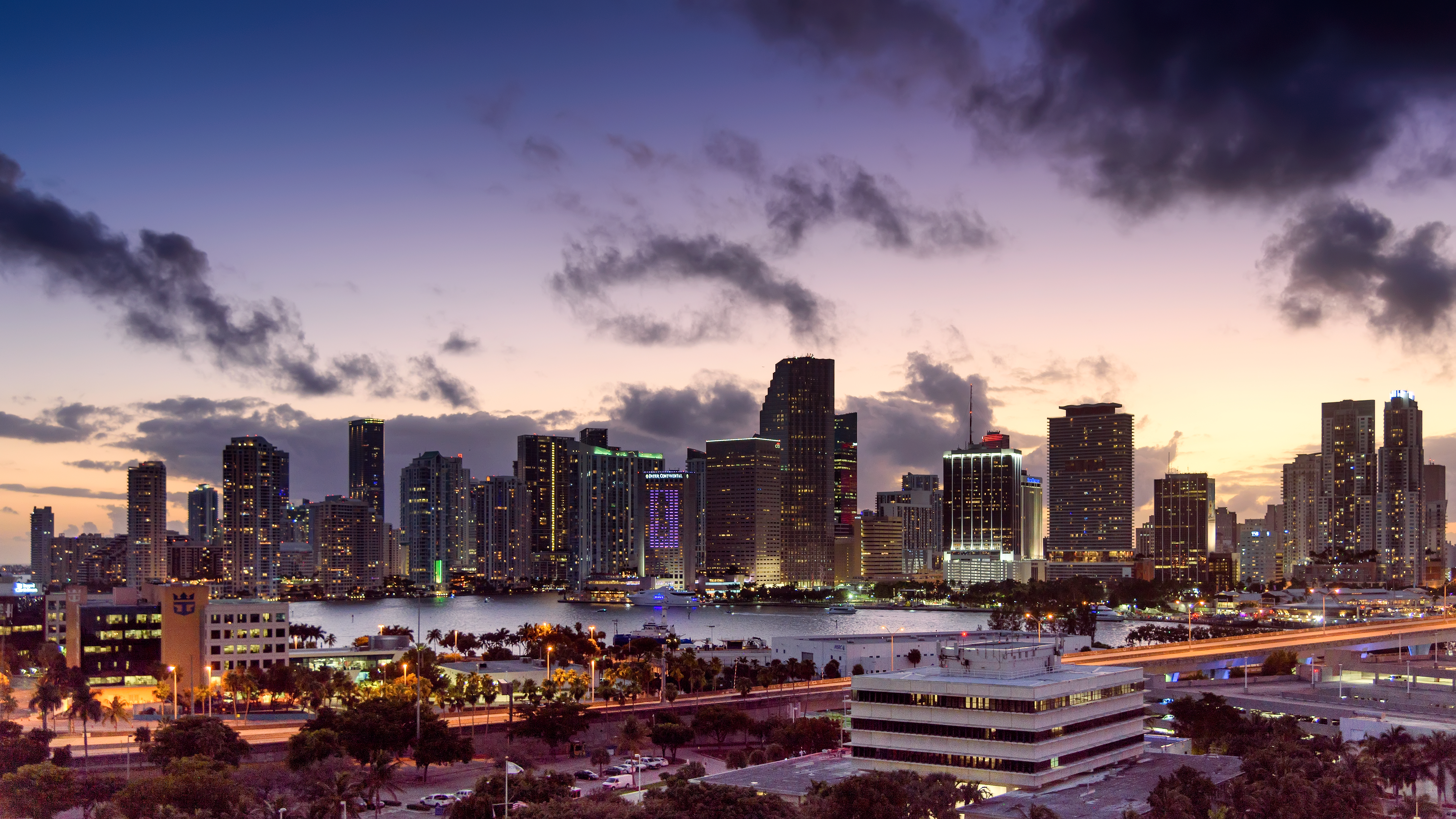
Miami skyline at night in January 2019

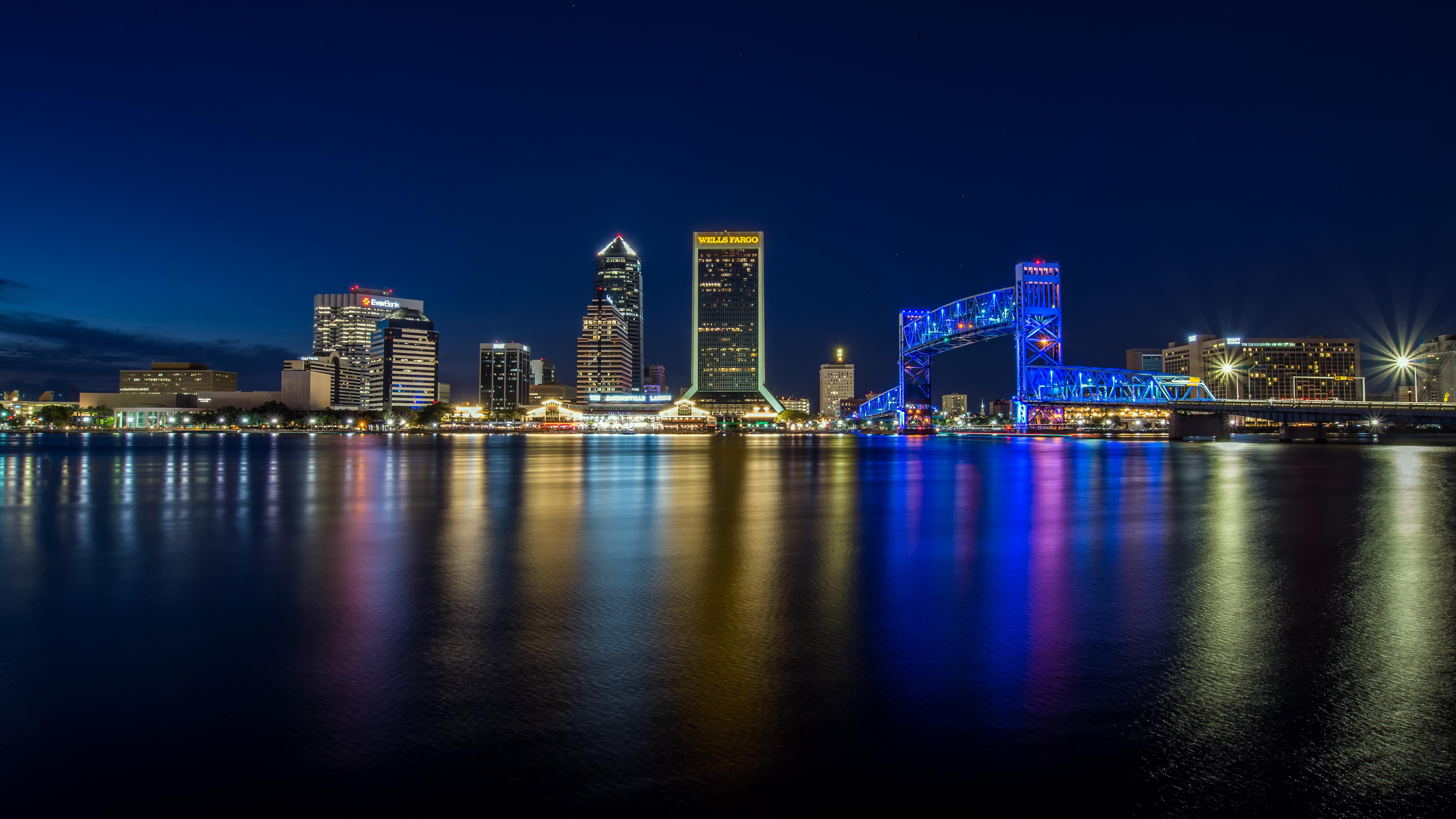
Jacksonville skyline at night

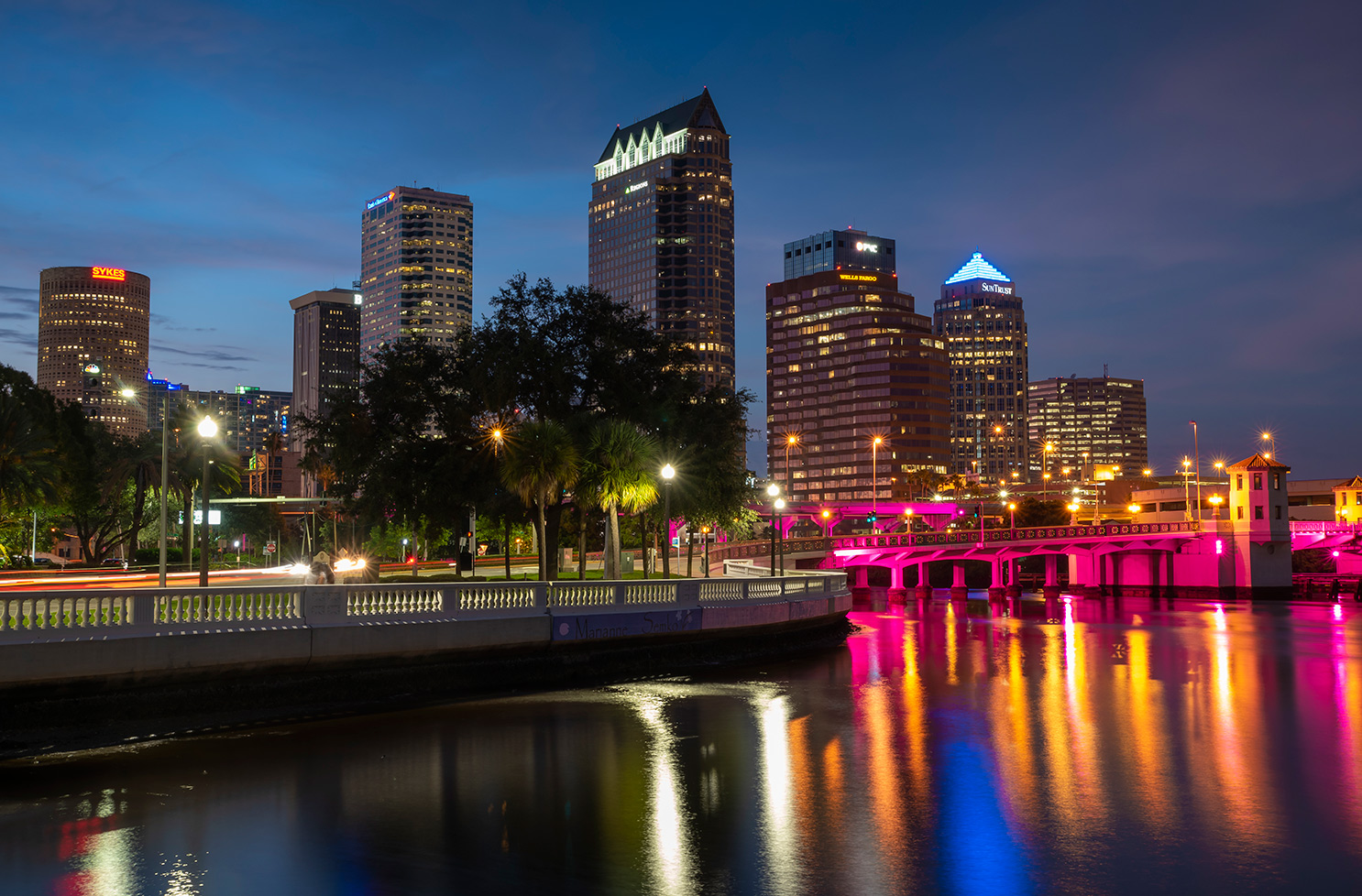
Tampa skyline at night

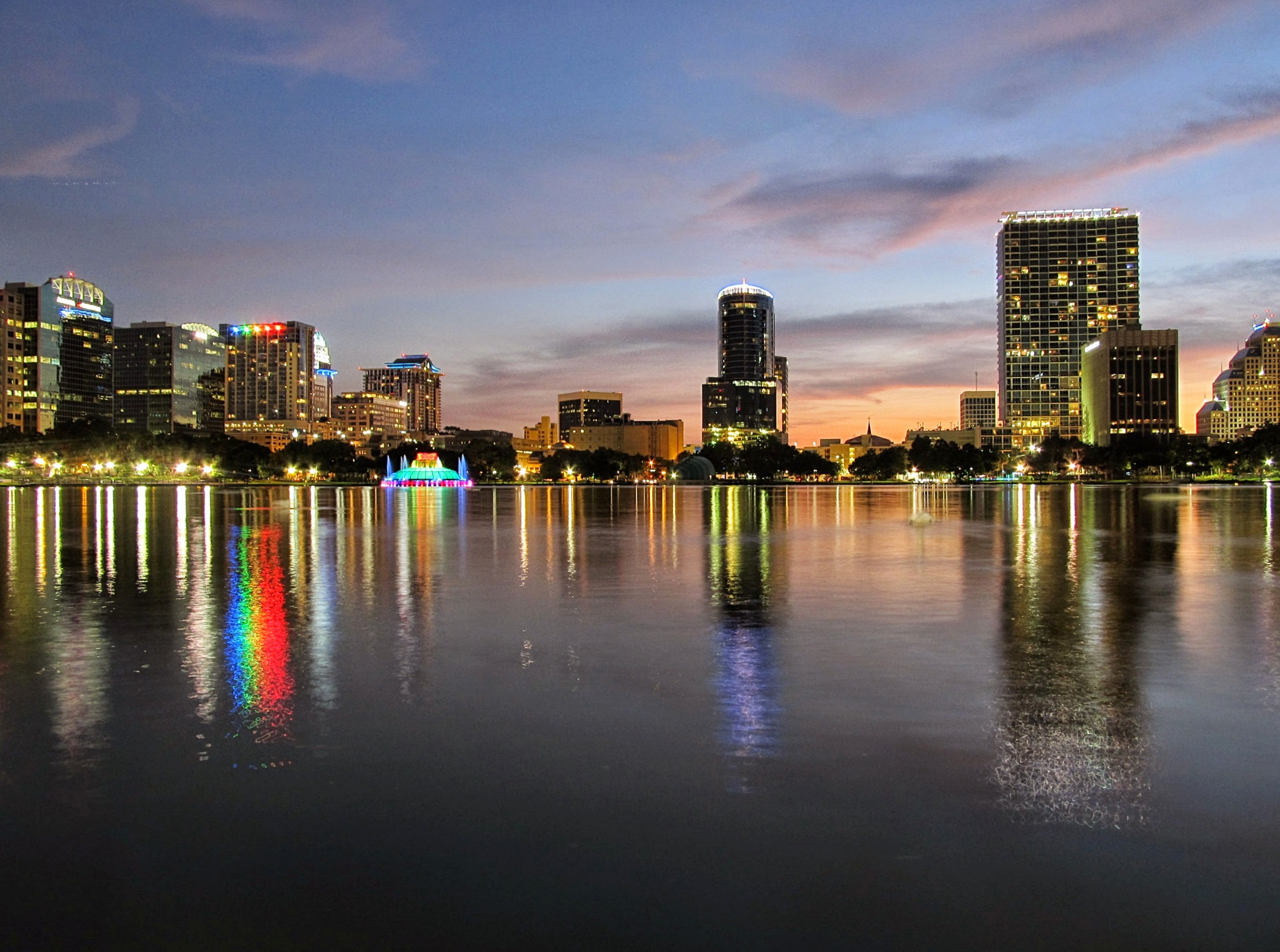
Orlando skyline at night from Lake Eola Park, 2016

This list of tallest buildings in Florida ranks the tallest buildings (170 metres (560 ft) or higher) in the U.S. state of Florida by height.

The tallest completed building in the state is the 85-story Panorama Tower, completed in 2017, which rises 868 feet (265 m) in Miami's Brickell district. Cipriani Residences Miami, at 940 ft (287 m) tall, topped out in 2026 and is set to be completed in 2028. As of 2025, the top ten tallest buildings in Florida are all located in Miami.

Florida has 45 buildings that are 550 feet (170 m) or higher. The majority are located in the City of Miami, and over 94% are in the Greater Miami area while the rest are in the Tampa and Jacksonville areas. None of them are in the Orlando area. Of the 37 tallest buildings in Florida, 24 are in the City of Miami, 14 are in Sunny Isles Beach, 2 are in Miami Beach, 2 are in Tampa, and 1 is in Jacksonville. The Greater Miami area accounts for 34 of the 37 tallest buildings over 550 feet in Florida. Miami is ranked as the third largest skyline in the United States after New York City and Chicago, even without counting the extended skyline up the beach to Sunny Isles and Fort Lauderdale.

The majority of the skyscrapers in Miami are within the Greater Downtown Miami area, specifically the neighborhoods of the Central Business District (including the Downtown Miami Historic District), Arts & Entertainment District, Brickell, and Edgewater.

== Tallest buildings ==
Was the tallest building in Florida upon completion

This list ranks the tallest buildings in Florida that stand at least 550 ft (or 167m) tall, based on standard height measurement. This includes spires and architectural details but does not include antenna masts.^{[A]} An equals sign (=) following a rank indicates the same height between two or more buildings. The "Year" column indicates the year in which a building was completed or topped-out. Where applicable, floor counts are given by the observed measurements, as reported floor counts may include many skipped floors, not limited to floor 13.

Rank	Name	Image	Height ft (m)	Floors	Year	City	Notes
1	Cipriani Residences Miami		950 (289.5)	80	2028	Miami	Topped out in July 2026 as the tallest building in Miami and Florida.
2	Panorama Tower		869 (265)	85	2017	Miami	Tallest completed building in Miami and Florida since 2017. 55th tallest in United States.
3	Aston Martin Residences		817 (249)	66	2023	Miami	83rd-tallest building in the United States, and tallest completed residential building south of New York City.
4	Four Seasons Hotel Miami		789 (240)	64	2003	Miami	86th-tallest in the United States; had been the tallest building in Miami and Florida from 2003-2017. Tallest building built in Miami and Florida in the 2000s.
5	Southeast Financial Center		764 (233)	55	1984	Miami	Tallest all-office building in the city and the state; tallest building built in Miami in the 1980s.
6	Brickell Flatiron		734 (224)	65	2019	Miami	
7	830 Brickell		725 (221)	57	2022	Miami	
8	One Thousand Museum		709 (216)	62	2018	Miami	
9	Paramount Miami Worldcenter		700 (213.3)	60	2019	Miami	
10	E11even Hotel and Residences		699 (213)	60	2025	Miami	
11	Marquis		679 (207)	63	2009	Miami	
=12	Estates at Acqualina South		672 (205)	52	2022	Sunny Isles Beach	
=12	Estates at Acqualina North		672 (205)	52	2023	Sunny Isles Beach	
13	900 Biscayne Bay		650 (198)	63	2008	Miami	Tallest all-residential skyscraper in Miami and Florida.
=14	Muse		649 (198)	47	2018	Sunny Isles Beach	Tallest building in Florida outside of the city of Miami.
=14	Turnberry Ocean Club Residences		649 (198)	52	2020	Sunny Isles Beach	Tallest building in Florida outside of the city of Miami.
15	Elysee Miami		649 (197)	57	2019	Miami	
16	Wells Fargo Center		647 (197)	47	2010	Miami	Formerly known as Met 2 Financial Center
17	Mansions at Acqualina		643 (196)	46	2015	Sunny Isles Beach	Second tallest building in Florida outside of the city of Miami.
18	Porsche Design Tower		641 (195)	57	2016	Sunny Isles Beach	Robotic car parking system will bring vehicles up to each unit.
19	Ritz-Carlton Residences		640 (195)	52	2020	Sunny Isles Beach	
20	Residences by Armani Casa		639 (195)	55	2019	Sunny Isles Beach	
21	Jade Signature		636 (194)	57	2017	Sunny Isles Beach	Topped-out
22	Echo Brickell		635 (193)	57	2017	Miami	Announced in Spring 2013. Topped out early 2017.
23	Mint at Riverfront		631 (192.3)	55	2008	Miami	
24	Infinity at Brickell		630 (192)	52	2008	Miami	
25	Miami Tower		625 (191)	47	1986	Miami	Designed by I.M. Pei & Partners. Formerly known as CenTrust Tower and Bank of America Tower.
26	Bank of America Tower		617 (188)	42	1990	Jacksonville	Formerly known as the Barnett Bank Center. Tallest building in Jacksonville, in North Florida, and outside of the Miami metropolitan area.
27	Marinablue		615 (187)	57	2007	Miami	
28	Plaza on Brickell Tower I		610 (186)	56	2007	Miami	
29	Epic		601 (183)	54	2009	Miami	
30	SLS Brickell		599 (183)	52	2016	Miami	Announced in Fall 2012. Construction began in January 2014, topped-out by early 2016 for late 2016 occupancy.
31	SLS Lux		595 (181)	57	2018	Miami	This is the third tower in the Brickell Heights development project. Construction began in 2014 and includes 450 condominiums and a 60-room SLS Hotel. Site work began in June 2014.
=32	Icon Brickell North Tower		586 (179)	58	2008	Miami	
=32	Icon Brickell South Tower		586 (179)	58	2008	Miami	
33	Ten Museum Park		585 (178)	50	2007	Miami	
34	100 North Tampa		579 (176)	42	1992	Tampa	Tallest building in Tampa since 1992. Tallest building along Florida's Gulf Coast, and Central Florida. Tallest building constructed in Tampa in the 1990’s. Also known as the Regions Building.
35	Bank of America Plaza		577 (176)	42	1986	Tampa	Damaged in a 2002 plane crash. Tallest building constructed in Tampa in the 1980’s.
36	Jade Beach		574 (175)	53	2008	Sunny Isles Beach	
37	Paramount Bay at Edgewater Square		555 (169)	47	2009	Miami	Designed by Arquitectonica Architects, Creative Vision by Lenny Kravitz for Kravitz Design Inc.
=38	50 Biscayne		554 (169)	55	2007	Miami	
=38	Quantum on the Bay South Tower		554 (169)	52	2008	Miami	Tallest building in the Arts & Entertainment District
39	Trump Palace		551 (168)	43	2005	Sunny Isles Beach	Tallest building in center of photo
=40	Acqualina Ocean Residences		550 (168)	51	2004	Sunny Isles Beach	Façade has a clock on it
=40	Biscayne Beach		550 (168)	51	2016	Miami	Residential apartment tower began construction in May 2014. Tower will have 399 units and a private "beach club." Topped of summer 2016.
=40	Trump Royale		550 (168)	43	2008	Sunny Isles Beach	Almost identical to adjacent Trump Palace

== Timeline of tallest buildings ==
This is a list of buildings that were the tallest in Florida when they were built, beginning in the early 20th century, when the skyscraper boom began in the state. Since 1902, six of Florida's tallest buildings have been in Jacksonville, five have been in Miami, two have been in Tampa, and one in Pensacola.

Years tallest	Name	Image	Height ft (m)	Floors	City	Notes
1896–1902	Florida Brewing Company building		82 (25)	6	Tampa	In its prime, The Florida Brewing Company produced 80,000 barrels of beer annually, making it the leading exporter of beer to Cuba in the U.S. and the premier brewery on Florida's West coast. The Florida Brewing Company survived the Prohibition and continued to thrive through the Great Depression. However, the embargo on Cuba and the opening of the Anheuser-Busch Company in Tampa ultimately led to its closing in 1961. A cigar company later took over the building. It also served as a bomb shelter during the Cold War. The building was eventually abandoned and fell into disrepair until it was restored in 1999. It now serves as offices for the law firm of Swope, Rodante, Newsome & Steinberg.
1902–1909	Dyal-Upchurch Building		82 (25)	6	Jacksonville	Built after the Great Fire of 1901.
1909–1910	121 Atlantic Place		135 (41)	10	Jacksonville	
1910-1912	Seville Tower		141 (43)	10	Pensacola	Located on the northeast corner of Palafox and Government Streets. It was built to accommodate more office space for the American National Bank. It replaced the three-story Clubbs Building, which was constructed in 1870. The American National Bank, along with the tower, was acquired by Florida National Bank in 1944.
1912–1913	Florida Life Building		148 (45)	11	Jacksonville	Part of the Laura Street Trio.
1913–1925	Heard National Bank Building		180 (55)	15	Jacksonville	The only one of Florida's ranking tallest buildings to have been demolished. It was torn down in 1981 and was later replaced by the Bank of America Tower, now Jacksonville's tallest building. The columned entrance façade was preserved.
1925–1926	Freedom Tower		256 (78)	17	Miami	The first of Florida's tallest buildings to be built outside of Tampa or Jacksonville.
1926–1928	Miami Biltmore Hotel		315 (96)	15	Coral Gables	Became Florida's tallest building one year after Coral Gables was incorporated.
1928–1966	Miami-Dade County Courthouse		394 (120)	28	Miami	
1966–1974	Vehicle Assembly Building		526 (160)	1	Merritt Island	Largest one-story building in the world.
1974-1981	Wells Fargo Center		535 (163)	37	Jacksonville	Formerly known as the Independent Life Building and the Modis Building; the last of Florida's tallest buildings to be in Jacksonville.
1981–1984	One Tampa City Center		538 (164)	48	Tampa	The last of Florida's tallest buildings to be in Tampa or anywhere outside of Miami.
1984–2003	Southeast Financial Center		764 (233)	55	Miami	Formerly the Wachovia Financial Center; currently Florida's tallest all-office building.
2003–2017	Four Seasons Hotel Miami		789 (240)	64	Miami	
2017–2026	Panorama Tower		869 (265)	85	Miami	Miami's and Florida's current tallest building.
2026–present	Cipriani Residences Miami		950 (289.5)	80	Miami	

== See also ==
- List of tallest buildings in Fort Lauderdale
- List of tallest buildings in Jacksonville
- List of tallest buildings in Miami
- List of tallest buildings in Miami Beach
- List of tallest buildings in Orlando
- List of tallest buildings in Sunny Isles Beach
- List of tallest buildings in St. Petersburg
- List of tallest buildings in Tallahassee
- List of tallest buildings in Tampa
