= Solitair Brickell =

High-rise condominium

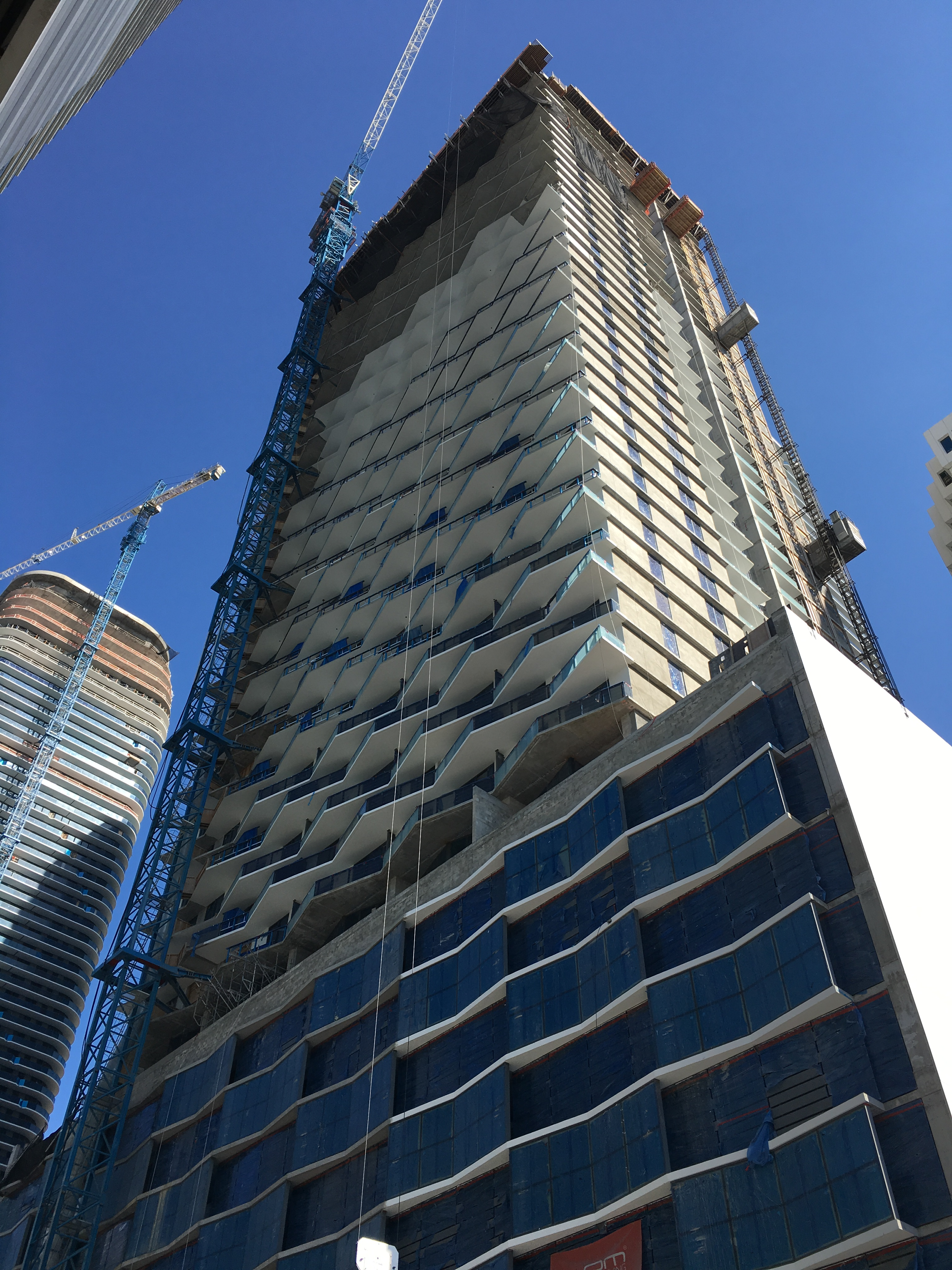
- Construction in March 2017 amid intense construction (Brickell Heights and SLS Lux visible)
- Interactive map of the Solitair Brickell area

General information
- Status: Completed
- Type: Condo
- Location: 86 SW 8 Street, Miami, Florida, United States
- Coordinates: 25.76618°N 80.19462°W
- Construction started: June 2015
- Completed: August 2018
- Opening: 2018

Height
- Roof: 555 ft (169 m)

Technical details
- Floor count: 48

Design and construction
- Architect: ADD Inc
- Developer: ZOM Living

Website
- livesolitair.com

Solitair Brickell is a high-rise apartment building in the Brickell district of Miami, Florida, USA. It contains 420 apartments and is about 555 feet (169 m) high with 48 floors when completed in 2017. The building was built in the place of a ramp to a parking garage to an adjacent 1980s office building known as the Brickell Bayview Center during a wave of high-rise residential development in the Greater Downtown Miami area in the 2010s. The building is adjacent to Brickell City Centre, a large mixed-use development completed in 2016.

== See also ==
- List of tallest buildings in Miami
