= Brickell Bayview Center =

Coordinates: 25.7657°N 80.1948°W

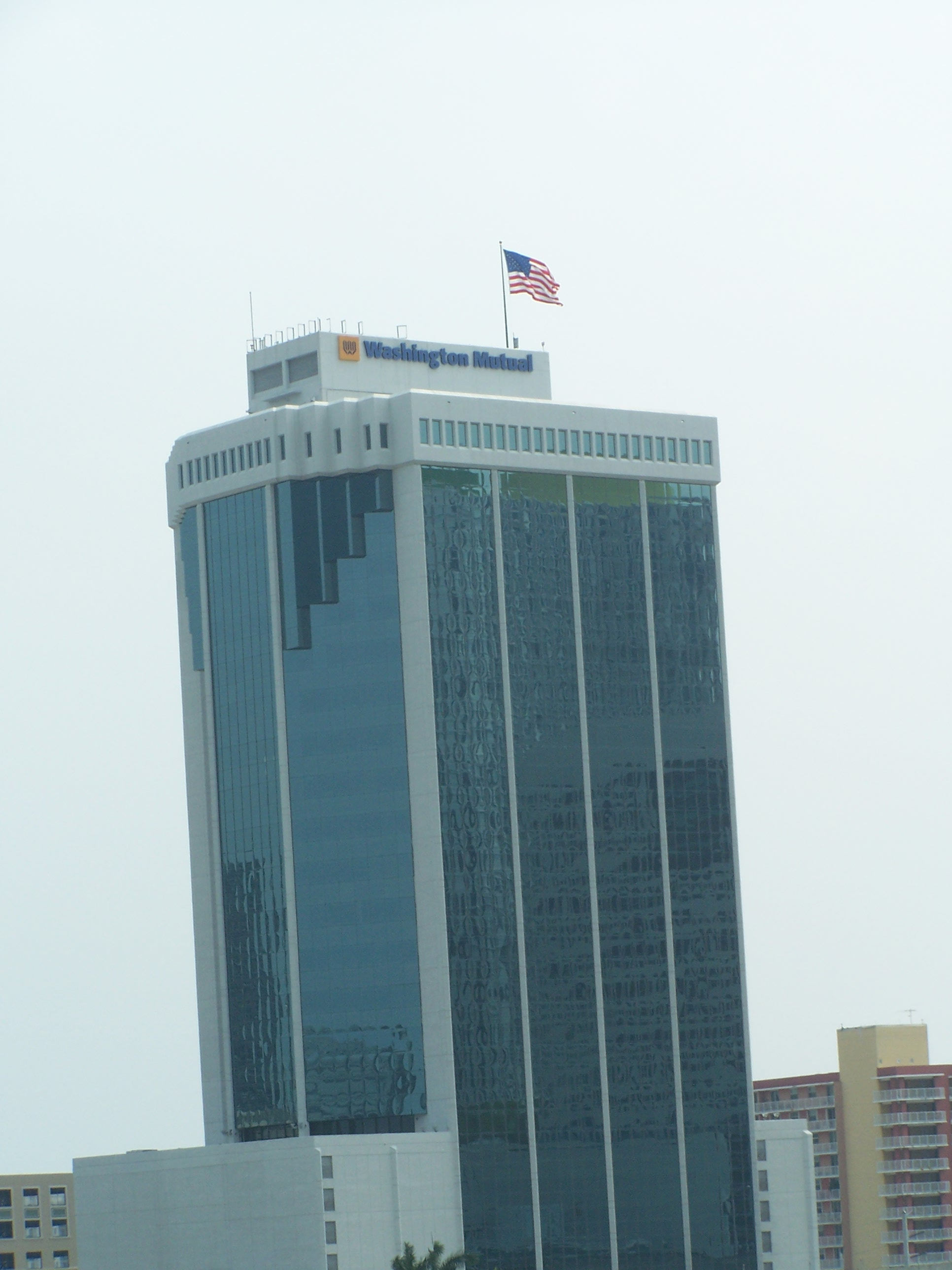
- Building in 2007 under Washington Mutual naming rights.
- Interactive map of the Brickell Bayview Center area

General information
- Status: Completed
- Type: Office
- Completed: 1986
- Owner: originally, Japanese Development Corporation

Height
- Roof: 330 ft (100 m)

Technical details
- Floor count: 30

Design and construction
- Architects: Hatcher, Zeigler, Gunn & Associates
- Developer: Japanese Development Corporation

Brickell Bayview Center, also known as the Brickell City Tower, is a skyscraper in the Brickell financial district of Miami, Florida, USA, at 80 SW 8th Street. The building is about 330 feet (100 m) with 30 floors and was designed in 1984 by South Miami architectural firm, Hatcher, Zeigler, Gunn and Associates for the Japanese Development Corporation, originally as the World Trade Center Miami Tower. Completed in 1986, the floor-to-ceiling glass facade building once stood alone on the western side of Brickell, which at the time was home to mostly office towers and older low-rise residential buildings. After two residential high-rise building booms, the first in the 2000s, concurrent with the 2000s real estate bubble, and the second in the mid-2010s and early 2020s, the building was virtually surrounded by taller buildings. Solitair Brickell required demolishing a parking ramp to the base of the building to the northeast, Brickell Heights was built directly adjacent to the east, and Nine at Mary Brickell Village was built directly to the south of the building. To the west, even West Brickell saw significant mid-rise development in the 2010s, such as the West Brickell View low income senior housing two blocks to the west. In 2023, another building, the Brickell Gateway Tower, was proposed between it and Solitair.

It is adjacent to the Brickell Metrorail and Metromover station. The building is also known as the Chase Building, naming rights for anchor tenant Chase Bank, which has a branch on the ground floor. It was once one of the tallest buildings in Miami until the mid-2000s, but by 2023 wouldn't even be in the top 150.

The 285,595-square-foot (26,532.6 m^{2}) building was sold in 2013 for US$70 million. The building was sold again in October 2018 for $117.25 million to the real estate arm of New York Life Insurance Company.

== Gallery ==
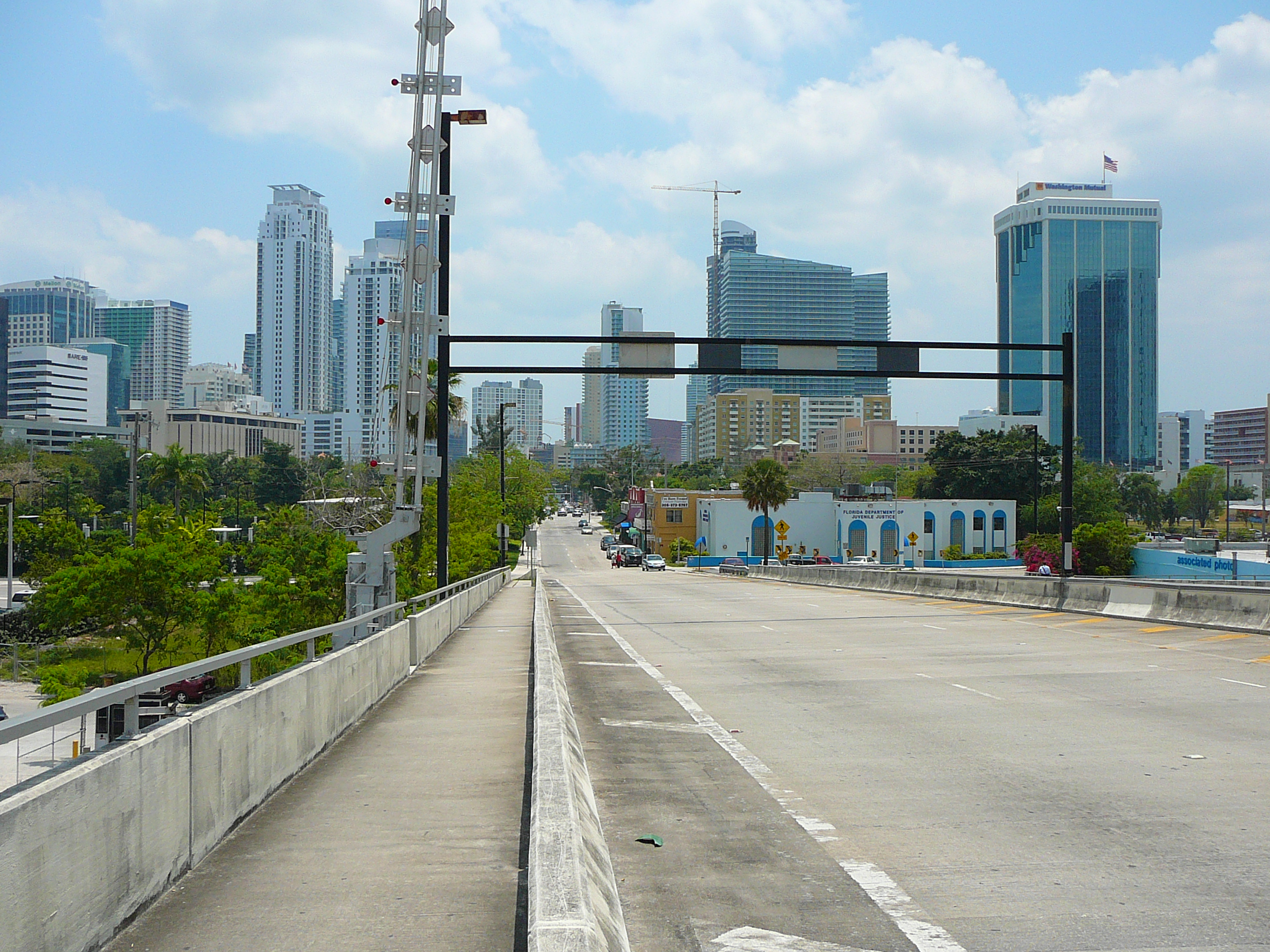
View from Miami Avenue in 2008

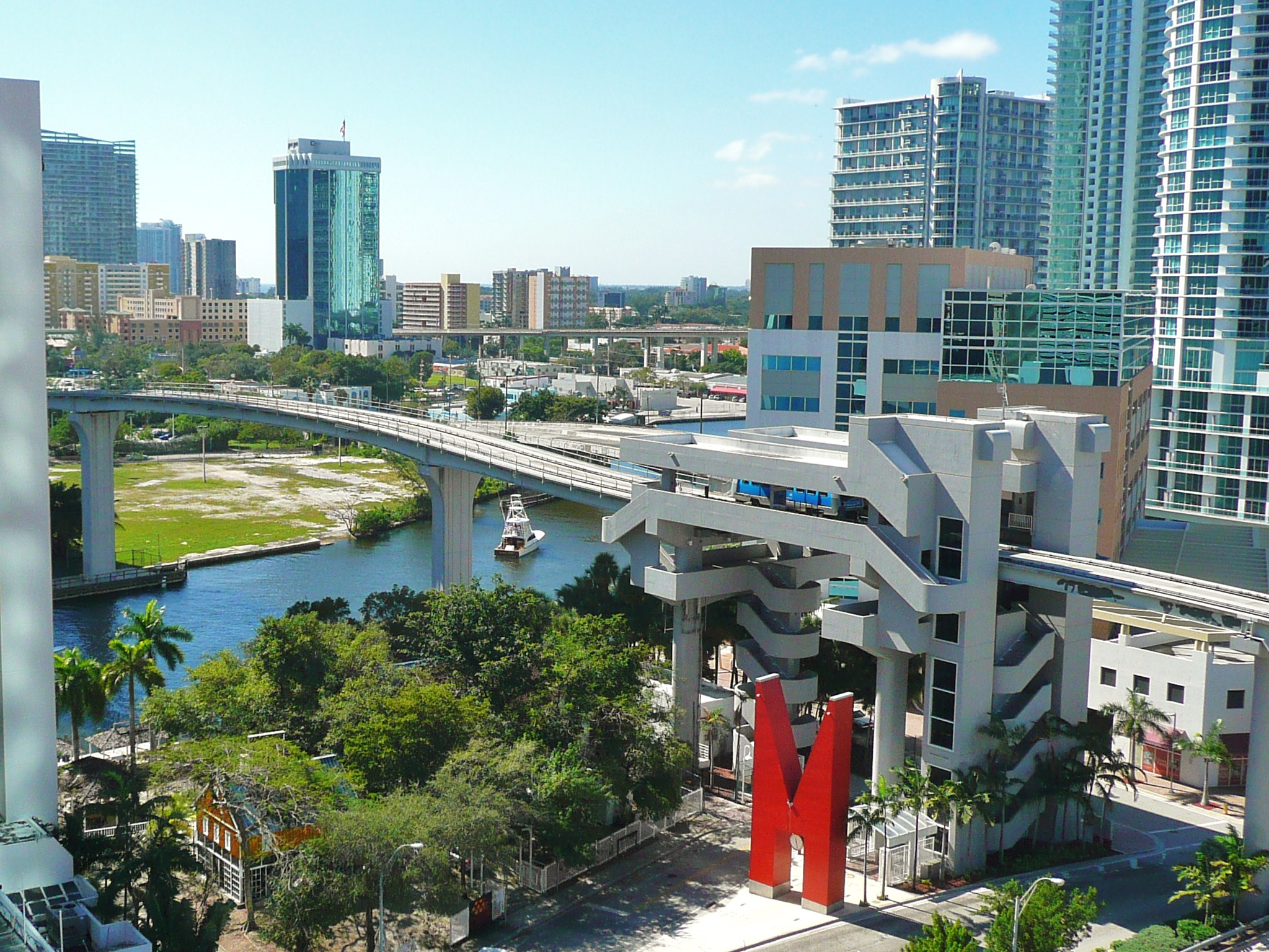
From northeast with Metromover station in foreground in 2010

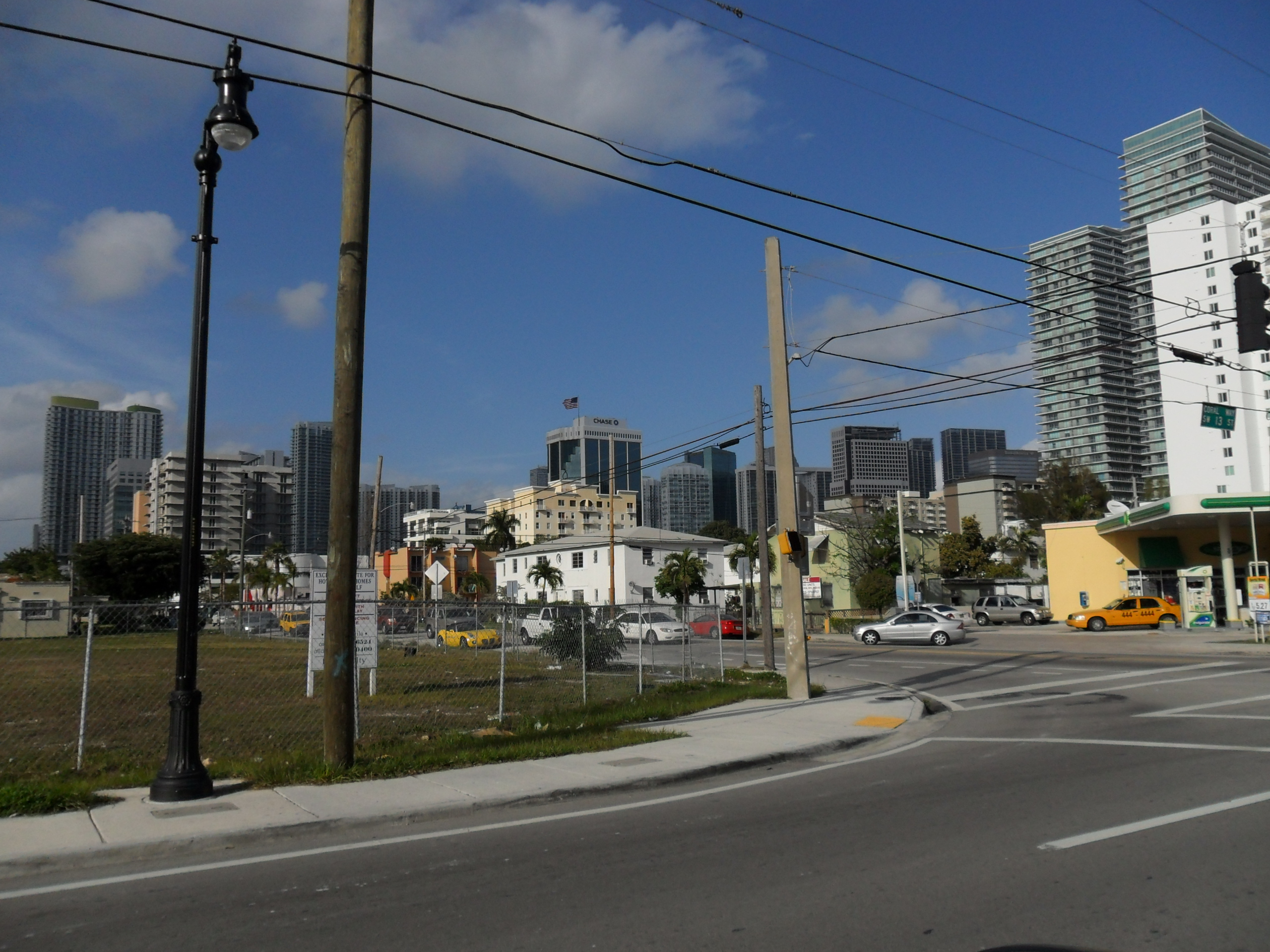
From the southwest in 2011

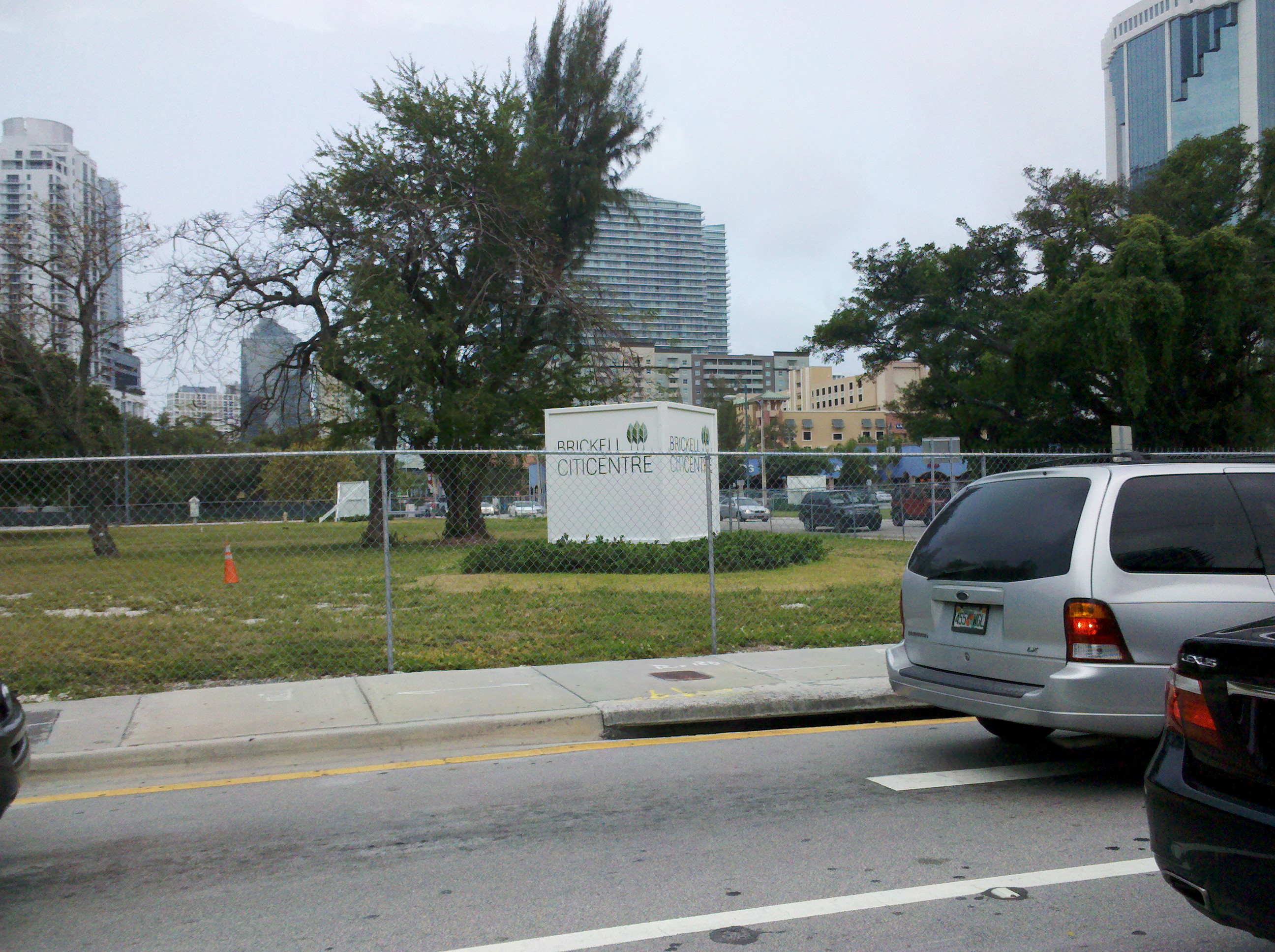
From the northeast in 2011 with empty plots where massive Brickell City Centre was built

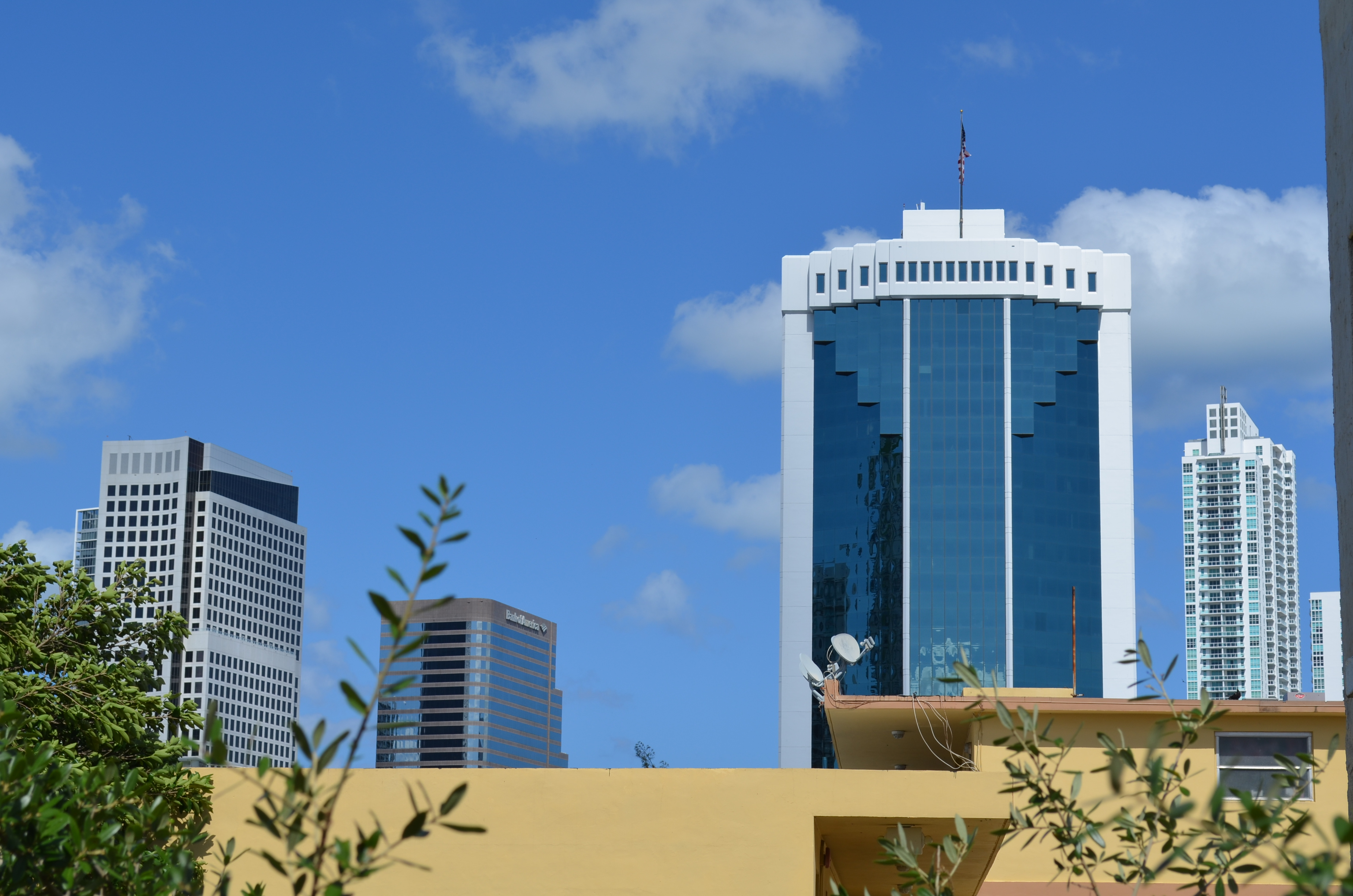
From the west in 2012

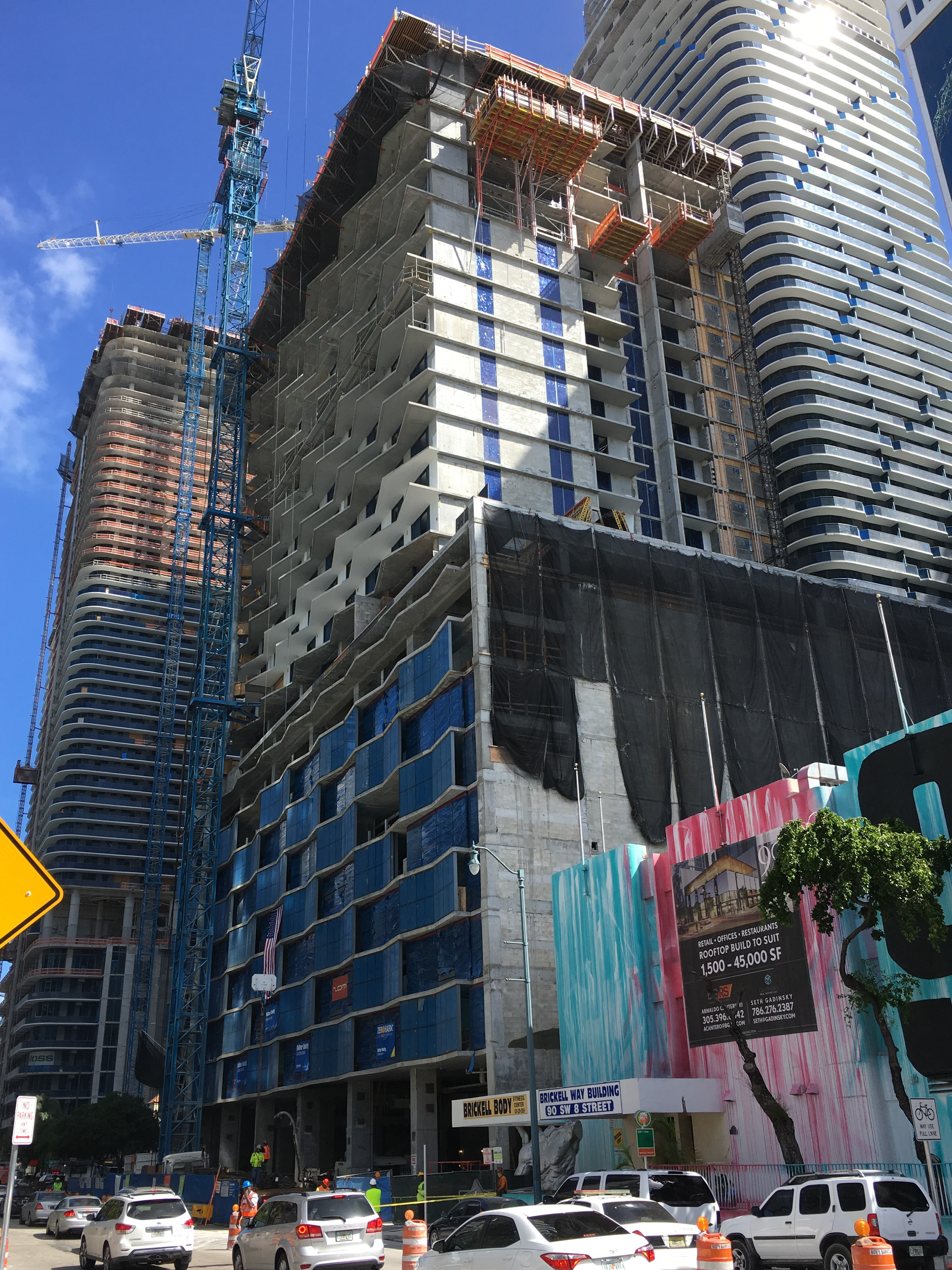
Four towers under construction on the east side in 2016

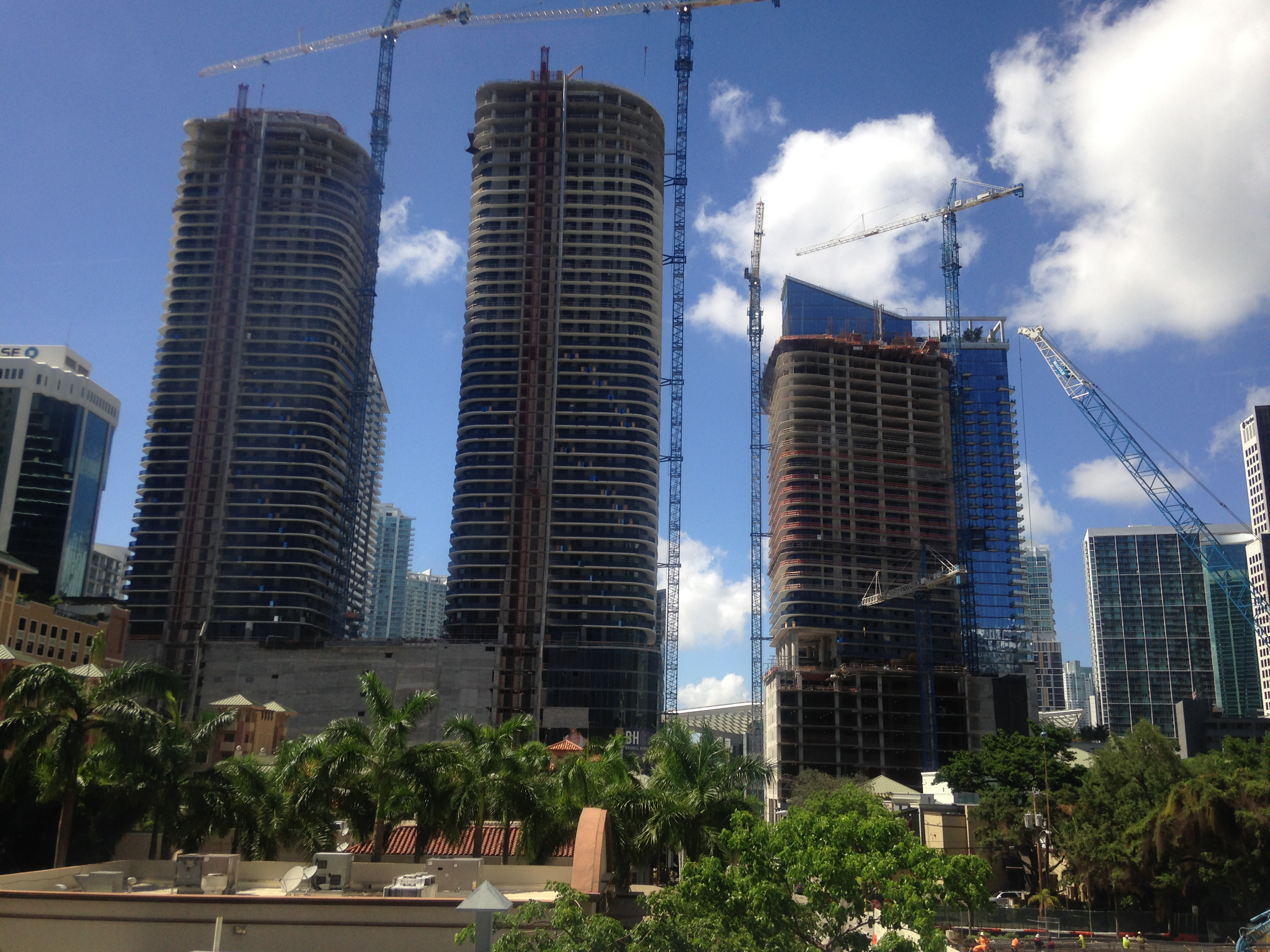
Brickell Heights and SLS Lux under construction directly east in 2016

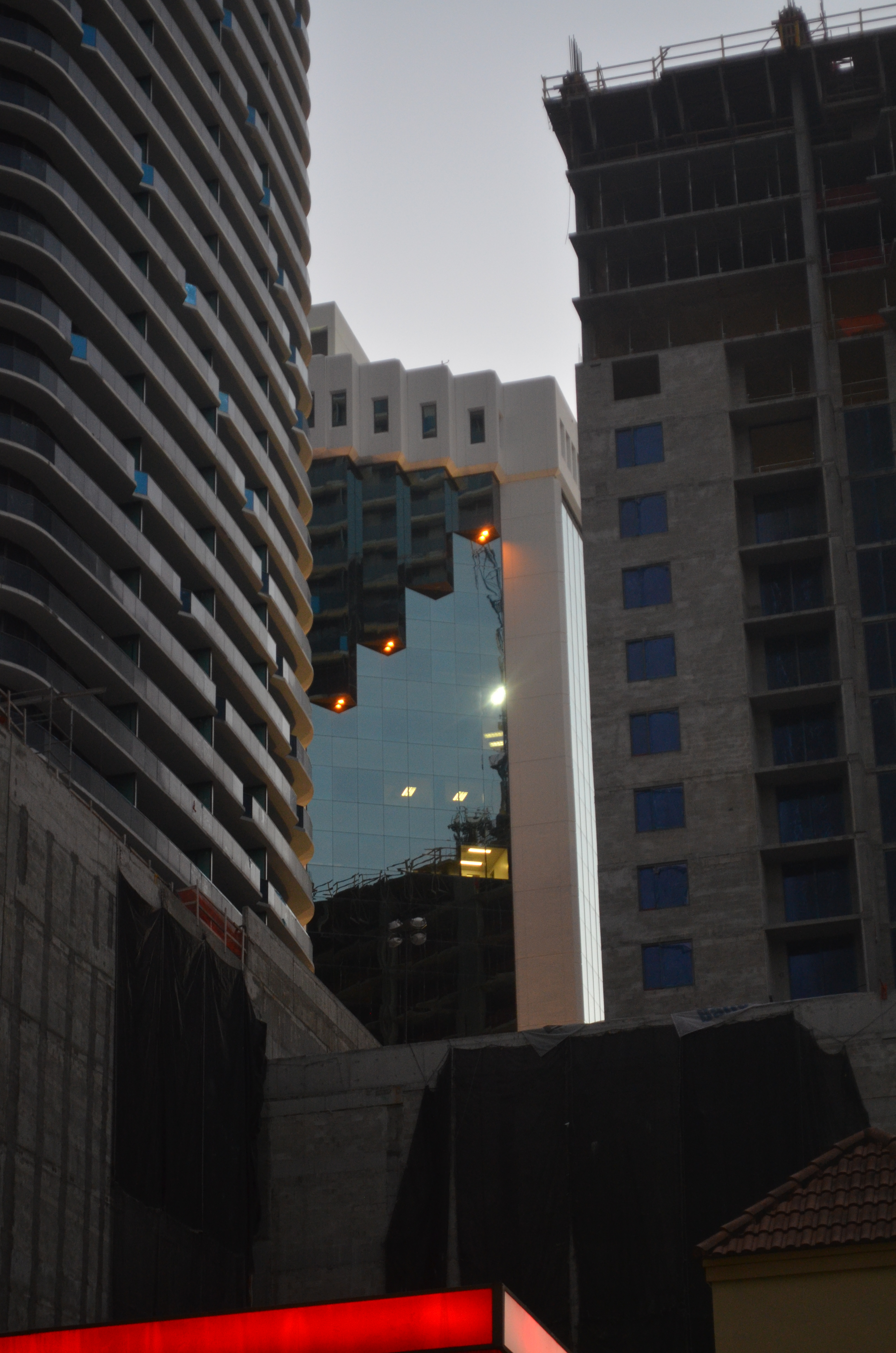
Brickell Bayview Center viewed narrowly between Brickell Heights and Solitair Brickell

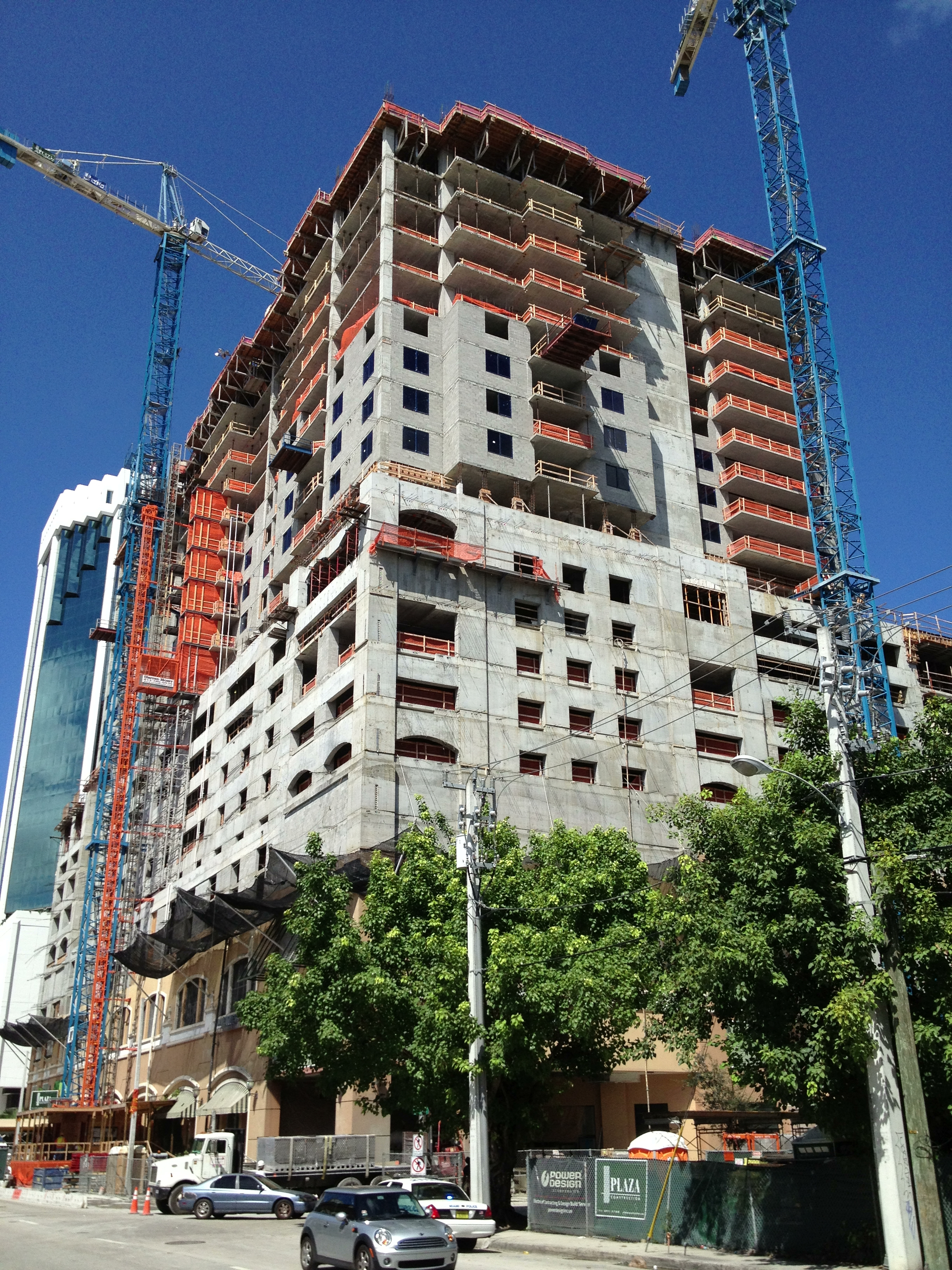
Building under construction to the south in 2013

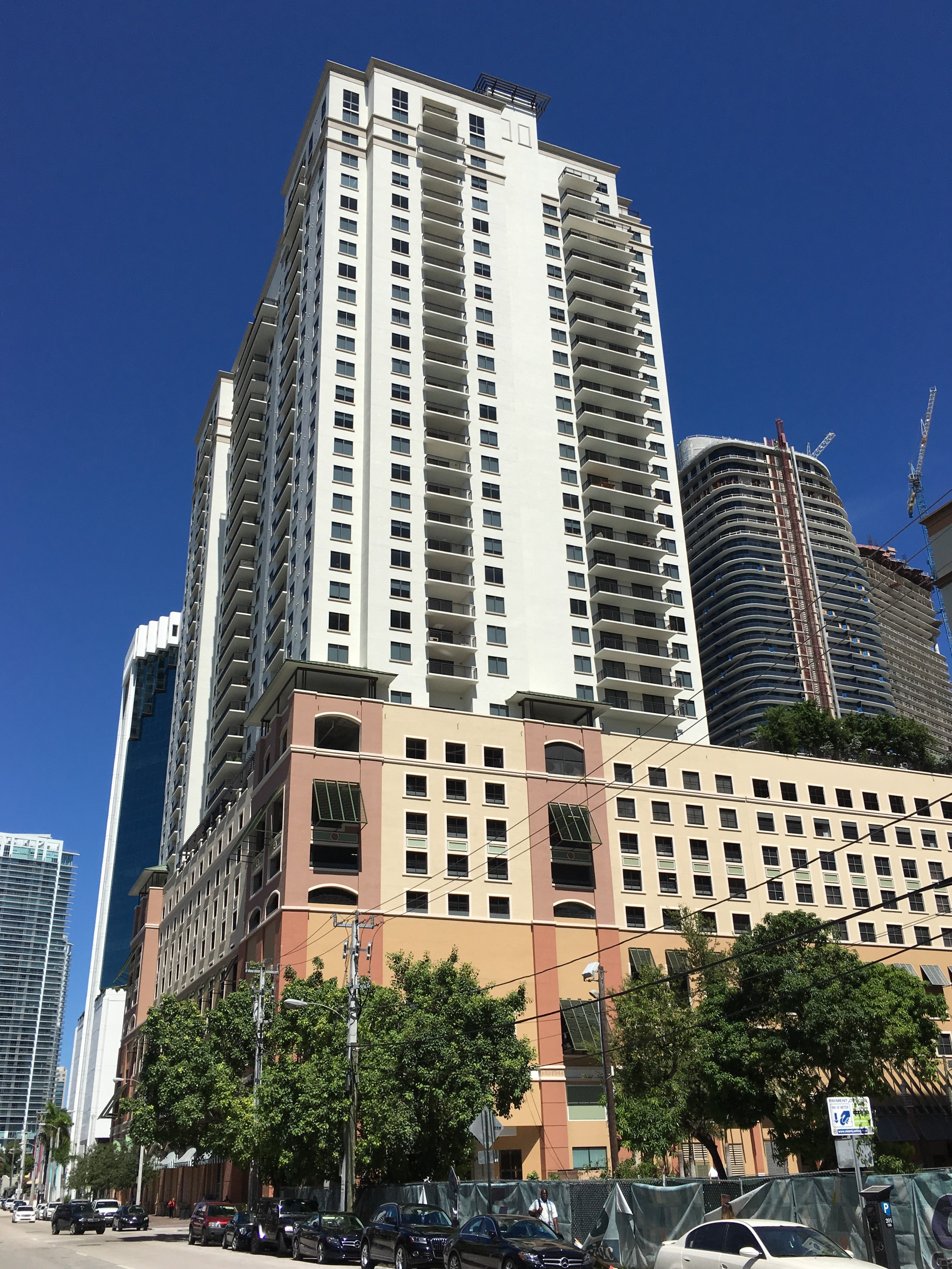
NINE at Mary Brickell Village was built to the south in 2014
