= Marinablue =

Skyscraper in Miami, Florida, United States

Coordinates: 25°46′56″N 80°11′23″W

MarinaBlue
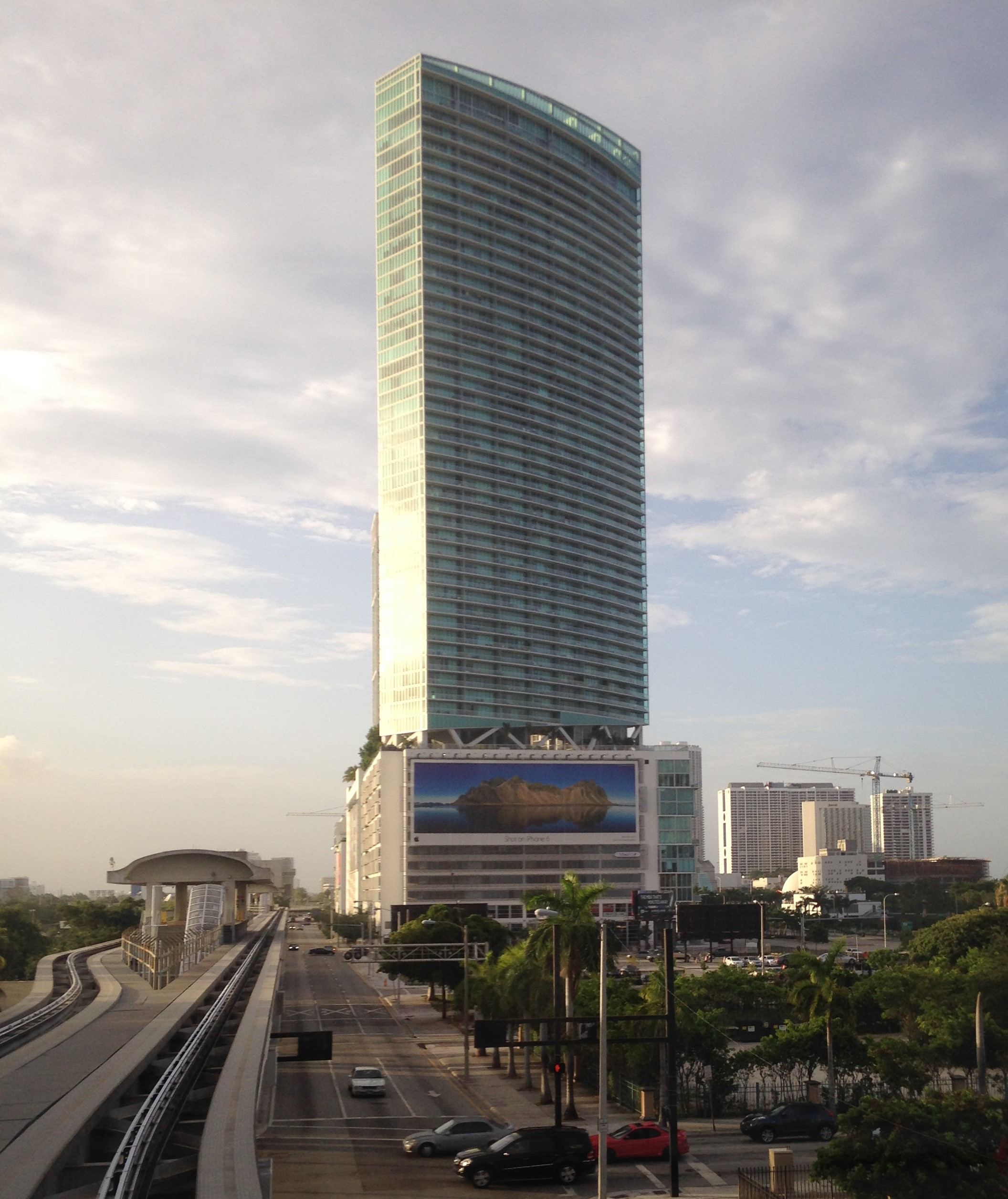
- As seen from Freedom Tower station
- Interactive map of the MarinaBlue area

General information
- Type: Residential
- Location: 888 Biscayne Boulevard, Miami, Florida, United States
- Construction started: 2004
- Completed: 2007
- Opening: 2007

Height
- Roof: 615 ft (187 m)

Technical details
- Floor count: 57

Design and construction
- Architect: Arquitectonica
- Developer: Hyperion Development

MarinaBlue, also known as Marina Blue, is a skyscraper in Miami, Florida, United States. It is located in northeastern Downtown, on Biscayne Bay along the west side of Biscayne Boulevard. The tower was one of the first buildings in Park West to be completed. Built by Hyperion Development, the developers of another building named Blue on the Bay further uptown, the building finished construction in May 2007. Marinablue is located across the street from the Miami-Dade Arena. The building rises 615 feet (187 m), and has 57 floors. Marinablue is almost all-residential, with some retail and office space on the lower floors. The building was opened to residential occupancy since the spring of 2008. The building currently stands as the 9th-tallest in Miami and the 10th-tallest in Florida, as well as the 5th-tallest residential building in the city and the state.

== Gallery ==
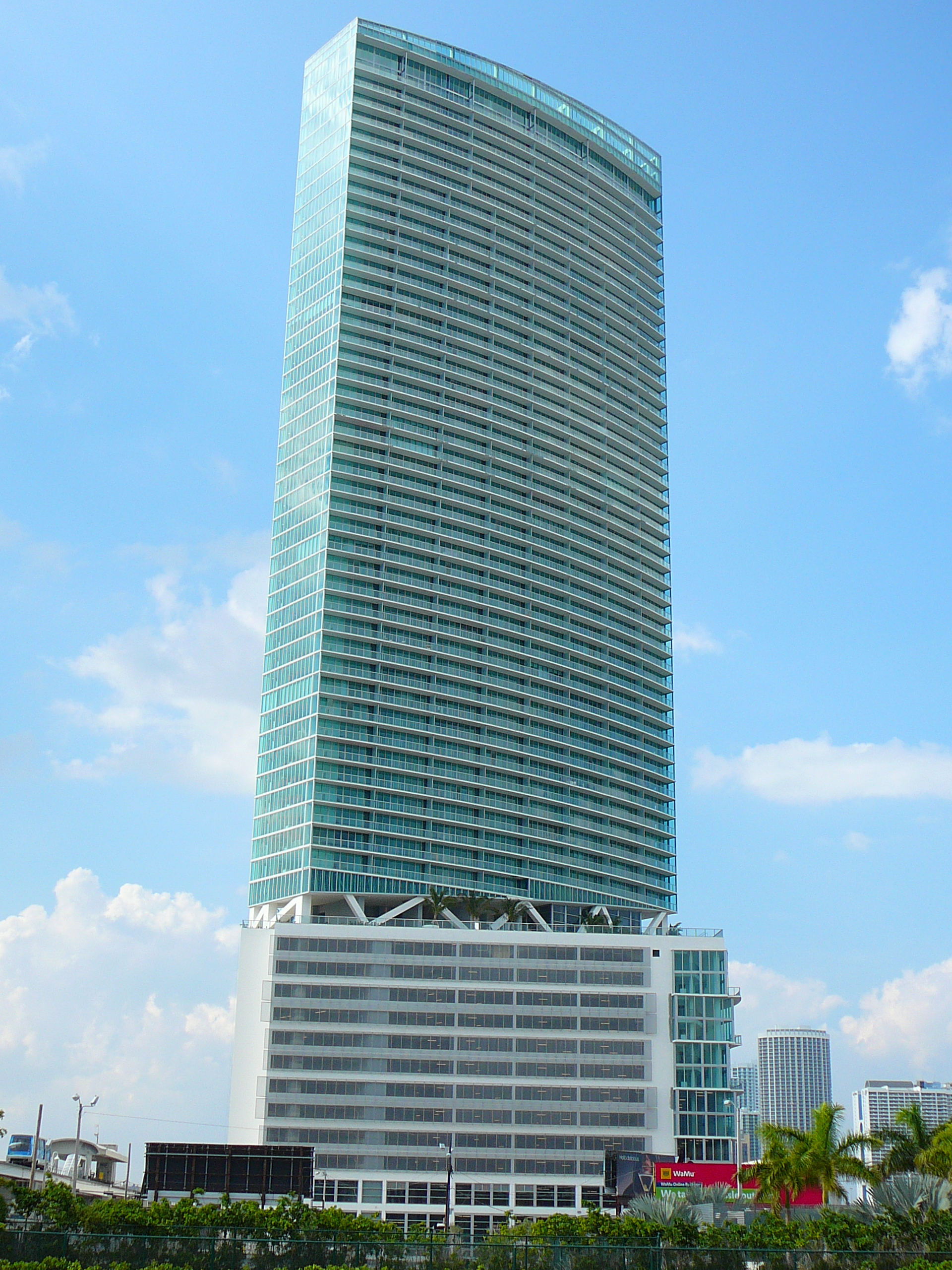
In May 2008

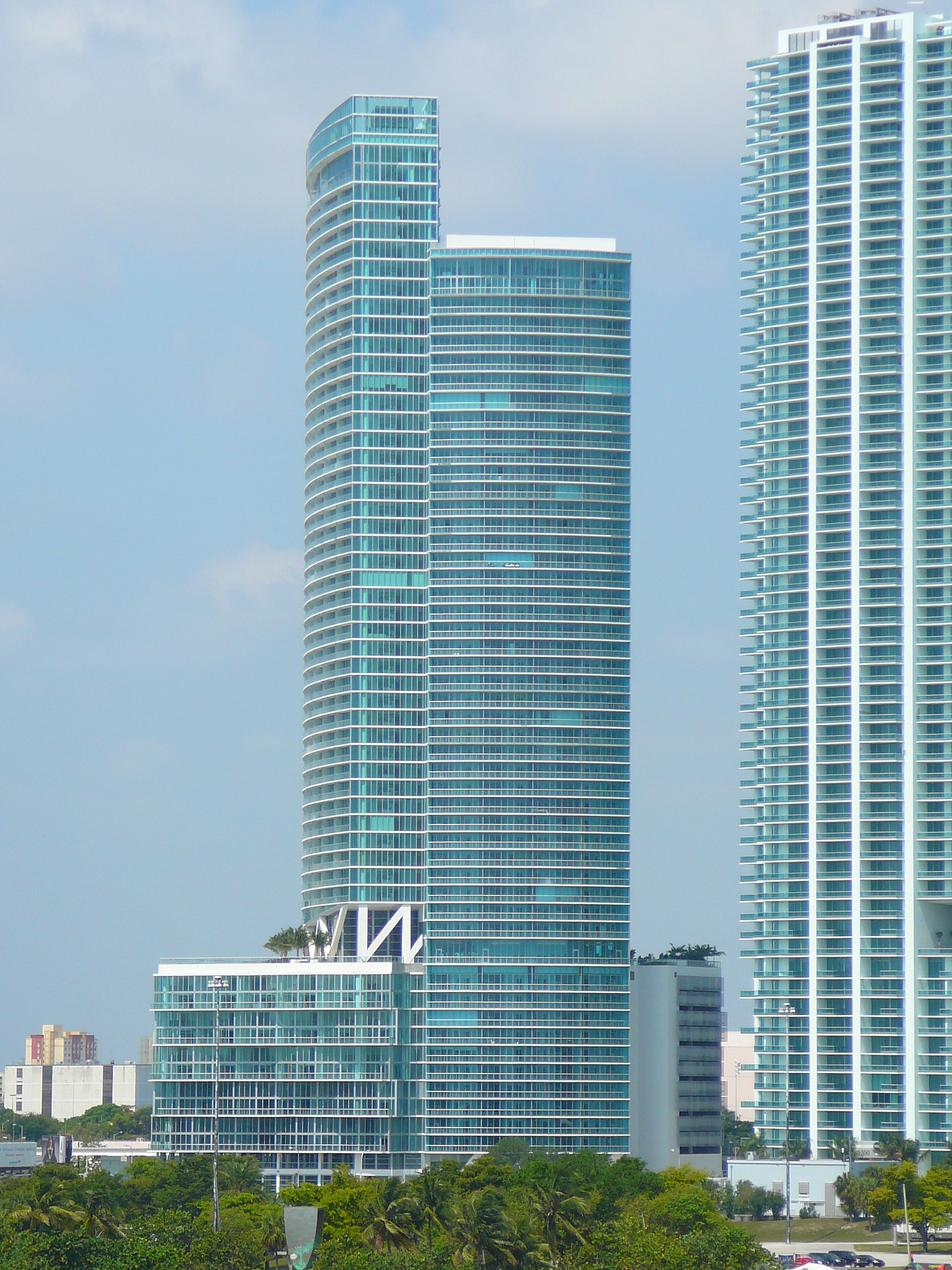
Marinablue from the east

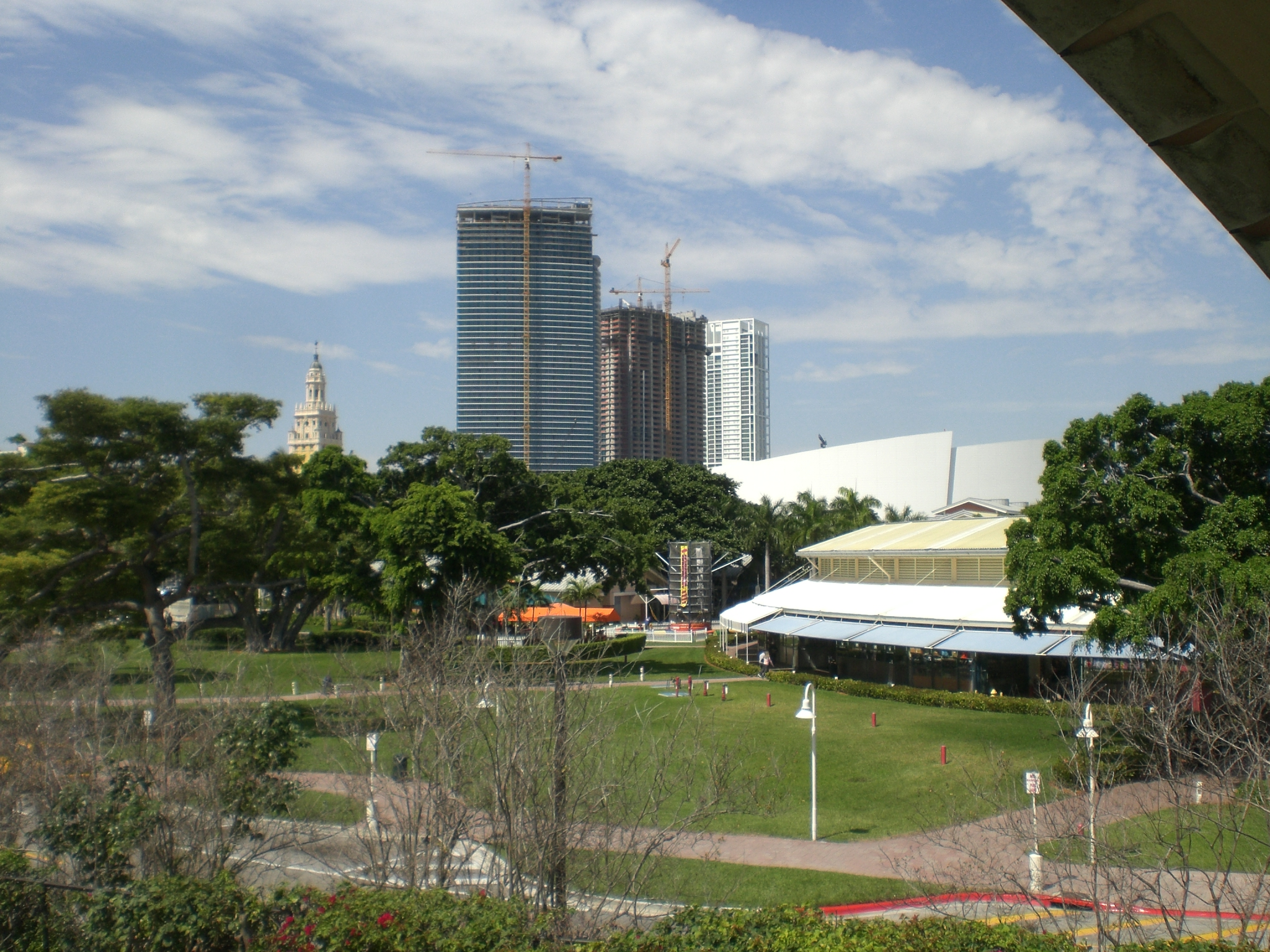
In January 2007, with the still under construction MarinaBlue to the left

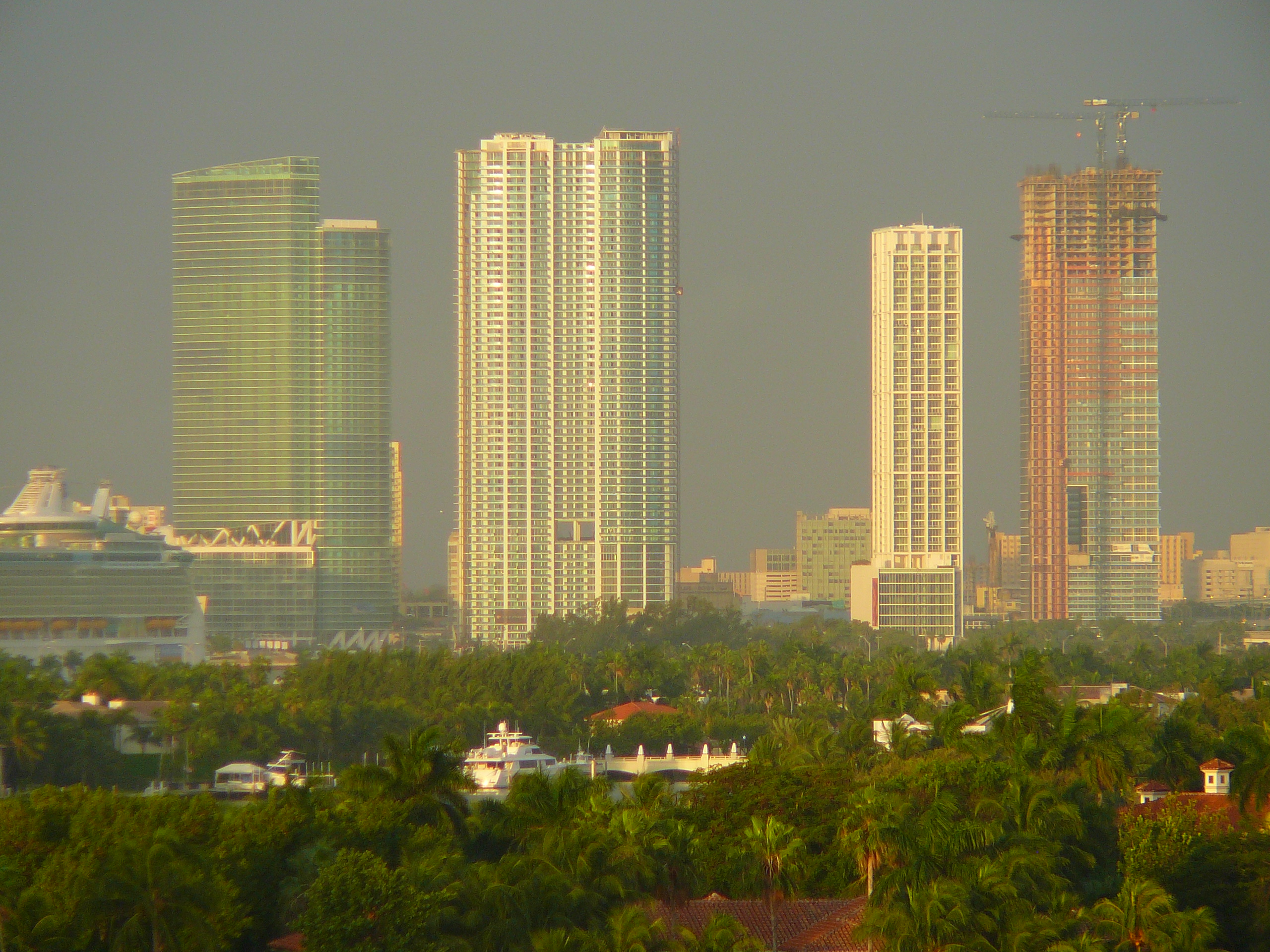
In December 2007, with the completed MarinaBlue to the left

== See also ==
- List of tallest buildings in Miami
- List of tallest buildings in Florida
- Downtown Miami
