= Riverfront (Miami) =

Highrise in Miami

Coordinates: 25°46′10″N 80°11′42″W

Mint Tower
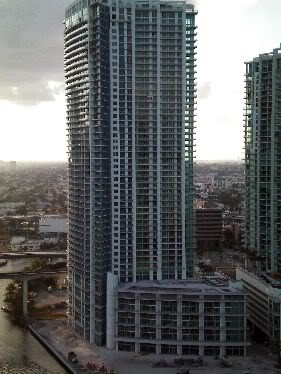
- Mint
- Interactive map of the Mint Tower area

General information
- Type: Residential
- Location: 350 South Miami Avenue, Miami, Florida, United States
- Construction started: 2006
- Completed: 2008

Height
- Roof: 631 ft (192 m)

Technical details
- Floor count: 55

Design and construction
- Architect: Revuelta Vega Leon
- Developer: Key International

The Ivy
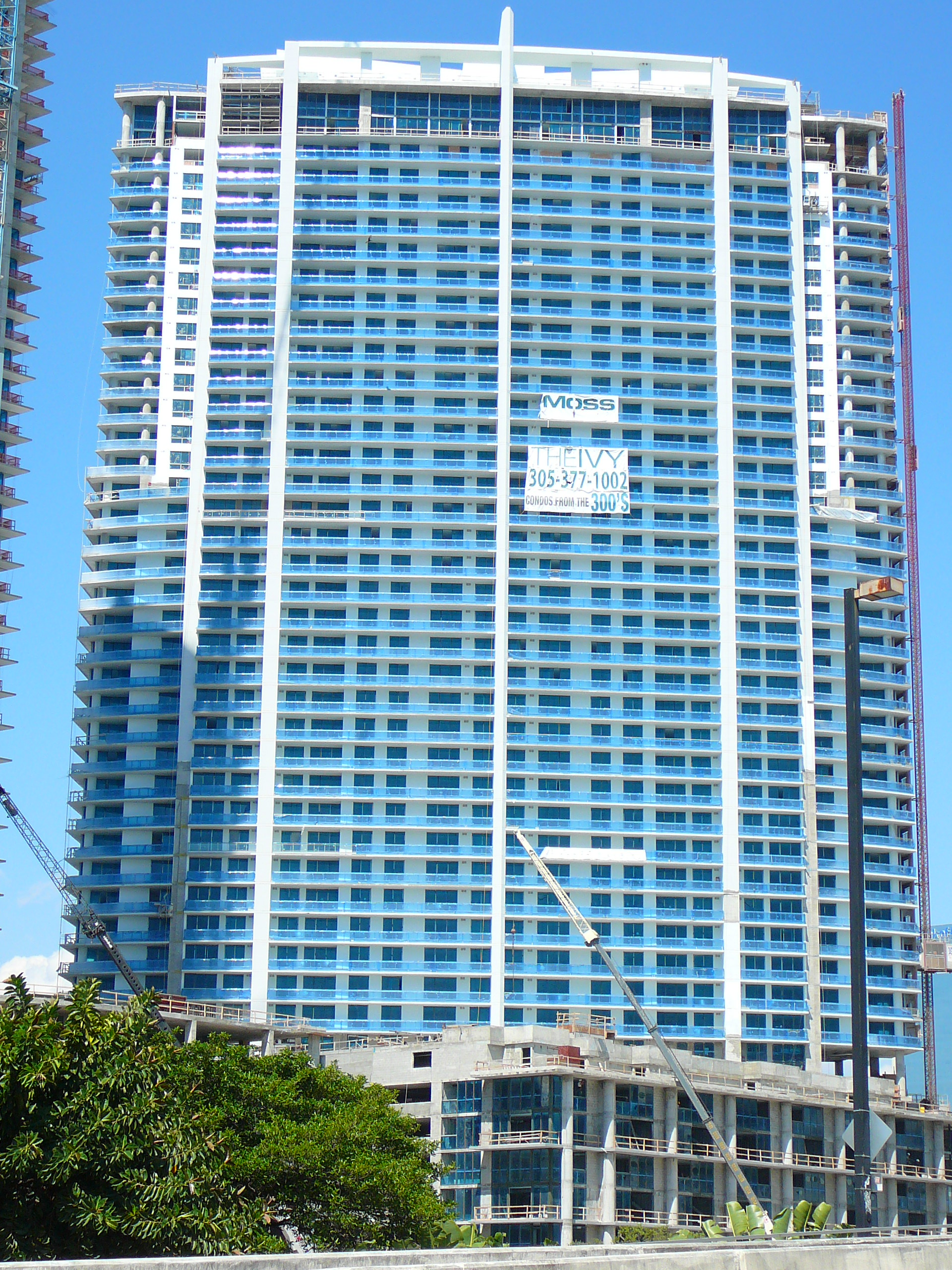
- The Ivy
- Interactive map of the The Ivy area

General information
- Type: Residential
- Location: 350 South Miami Avenue, Miami, Florida, United States
- Construction started: 2006
- Completed: July 2008

Height
- Roof: 512 ft (156 m)

Technical details
- Floor count: 45

Design and construction
- Architect: Revuelta Vega Leon
- Developer: Key International

The Riverfront is an urban development in Downtown Miami, Florida, United States. The complex is located on the north bank of the Miami River in Miami's Central Business District. The complex contains three main towers, "Mint" and "The Ivy" and "Wind." The taller of the three, Mint, is currently the 6th-tallest building in Miami and Florida. It has 55 floors and rises 631 feet (192 m).

== History ==
The Ivy opened in July, 2008. This tower is 512 feet (156 m) tall, and rises 45 floors. Ivy and Mint are developed by Key International. The third tower, Wind, was developed by Neo. "Wind," is a 45-story of 533 feet (162 m), was approved in 2006 by the city council of Miami and the Federal Aviation Administration, is the third tower in the complex. Construction began in 2007 and the tower was completed 2009.

"Cima" tower was proposed for the southeast corner of the Riverfront Complex but was never built. It was proposed to begin in 2006 and be completed by 2008. The tower was proposed to have 471 residential units with a height of 52 floors.

The final phase of the development was supposed to be Riverfront Phase IV, a 334 feet (102 m), 22-story building which would have been located to the west of the three towers. The Riverfront Retail Center was proposed to connect the buildings at the lower floors and was to be dedicated to retail. The towers were to be used for condominiums, apartments, and office space. The Miami Riverwalk and the Riverwalk Metro Station would have been incorporated into the development. The complex is bordered by Southwest 3rd Street to the north, the Miami River to the south, Southwest 1st Avenue to the east, and Southwest 4th Avenue to the west. It is served by the Riverwalk and Miami Avenue Metromover stations, which connect to the Metrorail at Government Center and Brickell stations. The architect is Revuelta Vega Leon.

== See also ==
- List of tallest buildings in Miami
- Downtown Miami
- List of tallest buildings in Florida
