= Infinity at Brickell =

Skyscraper in Miami

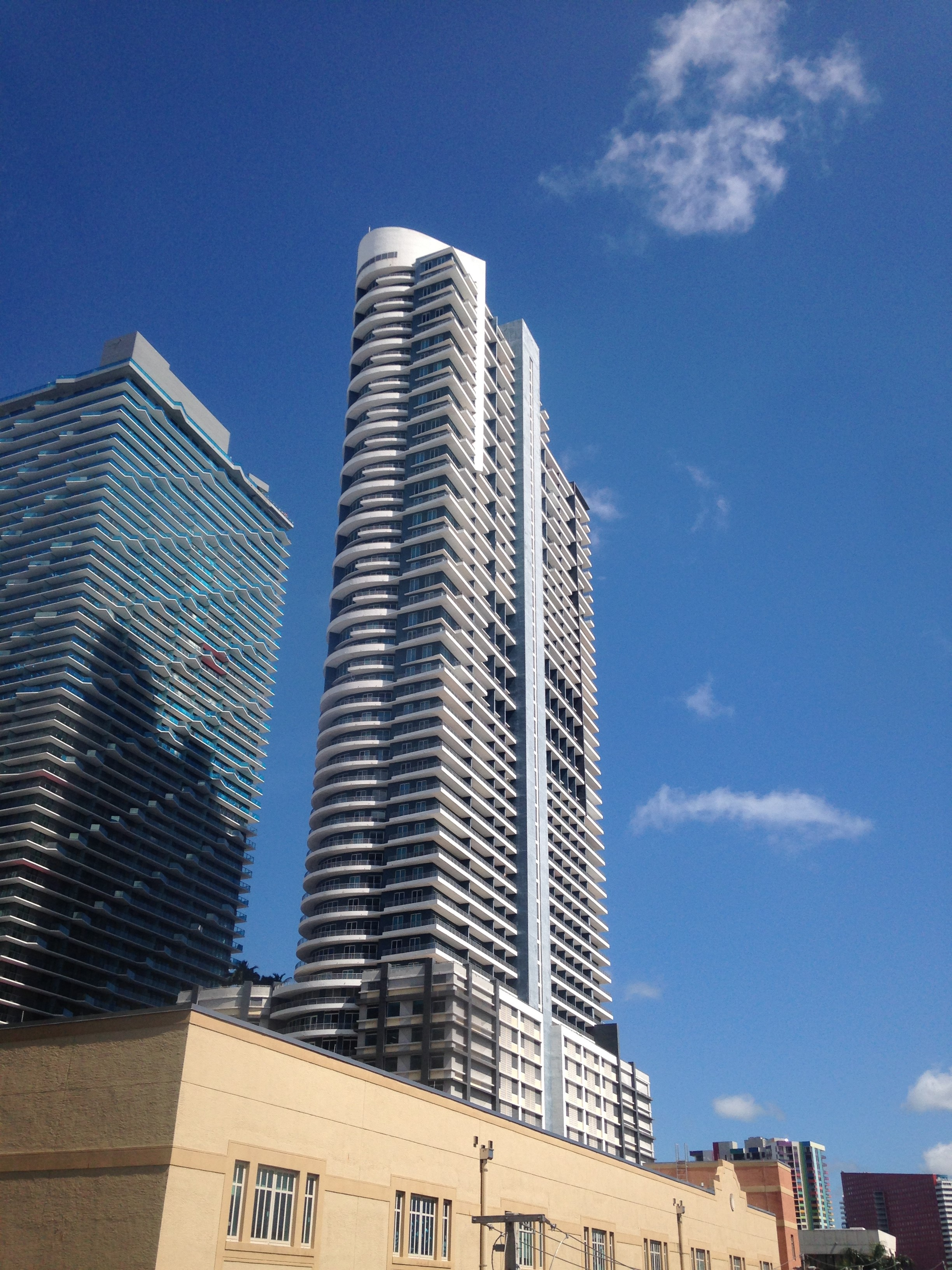
- The Infinity at Brickell in June 2016
- Interactive map of the Infinity at Brickell area

General information
- Type: Residential and office
- Location: 60 SW 13 Street, Miami FL 33130
- Coordinates: 25.76103°N 80.19415°W
- Construction started: 2006
- Completed: 2008
- Opening: 2008

Height
- Roof: 630 ft (190 m)

Technical details
- Floor count: 53

Design and construction
- Architects: Adache Group Architects Borges & Associates
- Developer: The DYL Group

Infinity at Brickell is a condominium in Miami, Florida, United States. It is located in Miami's Brickell Financial District. When it topped out, it was the 6th tallest building in Miami and Florida. Although not in the same complex, it was built across the street from Infinity II site, hence its name. The location is in southwestern Brickell, on South Miami Avenue near 13th Street. The building opened in 2008. It is 630 feet (190 m) tall, and has 53 floors. It is about 100 feet (30 m) shorter than Infinity II was supposed to be. The lower floors of the building are dedicated to office space and retail, while the upper floors are used for residential units. The architects are Adache Group Architects and Borges & Associates.

== See also ==
- List of tallest buildings in Miami
- List of tallest buildings in Florida
- Downtown Miami

== Gallery ==
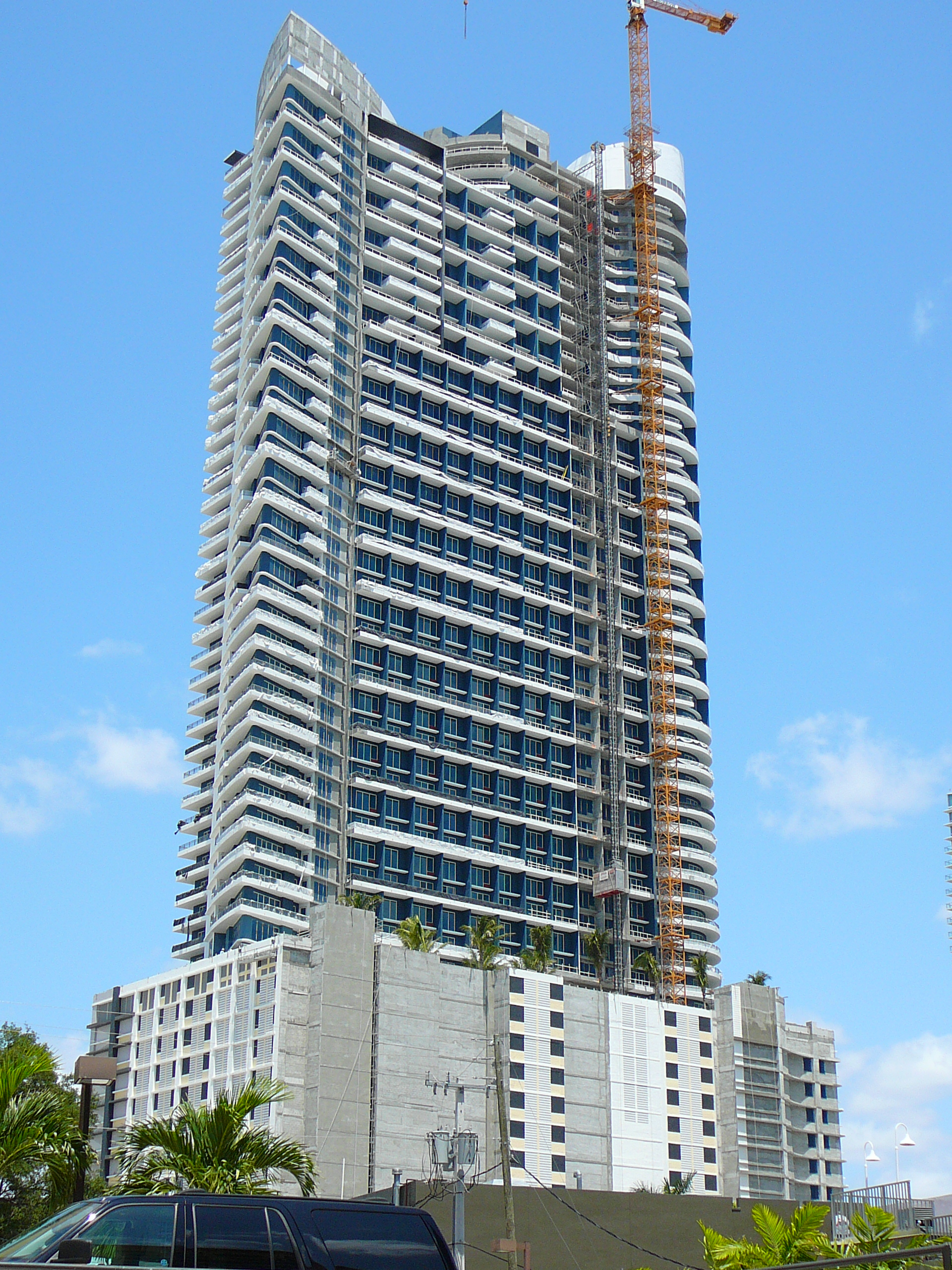
In May 2008

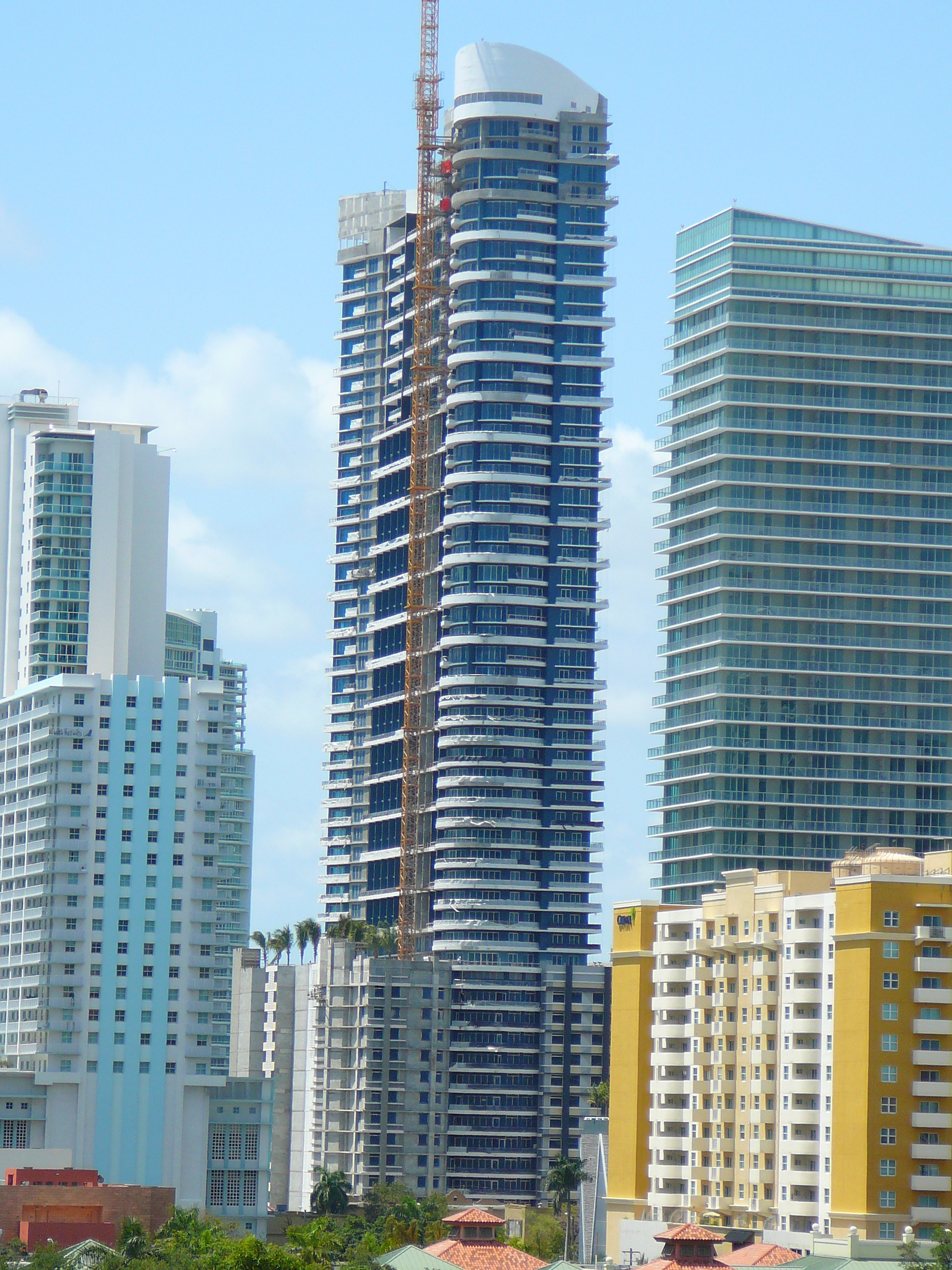
View from the north, May 2008

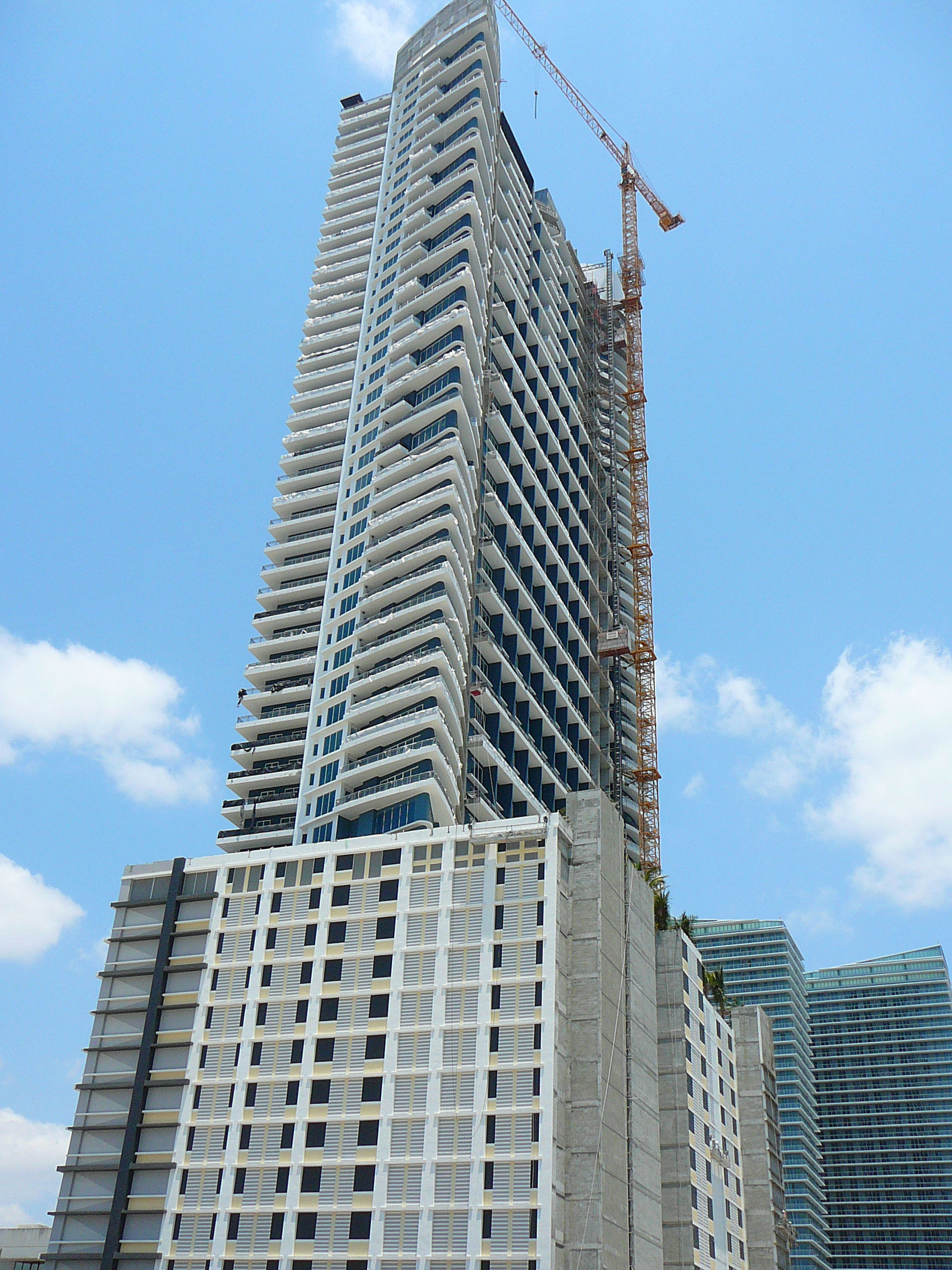
View from the south, May 2008

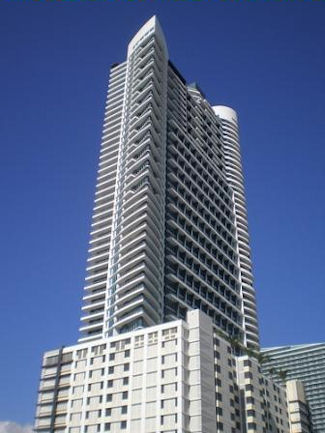
View from the street looking up
