= Brickell Heights =

Skyscrapers in Miami

- BRICKELL HEIGHTS EAST & WEST CONDOMINIUM ASSOCIATION, INC.
- Interactive map of the Brickell Heights area
- Alternative names: BRICKELL HEIGHTS MASTER ASSOCIATION, INC.

General information
- Status: Completed
- Type: Residential
- Architectural style: Modern
- Location: 55 & 45 SW 9TH ST, Miami, FL, 33130
- Coordinates: 25.765857348584166°N 80.19407301482386°W
- Construction started: July 2014
- Completed: 2017
- Opening: 2017
- Operator: KW Property Management & Consulting (KWPMC)

Height
- Roof: 529 ft (161 m) (west tower), 549 ft (167 m) (east tower)

Technical details
- Material: Concrete
- Floor count: 52

Design and construction
- Architect: Arquitectonica

Website
- www.mybrickellheights.com

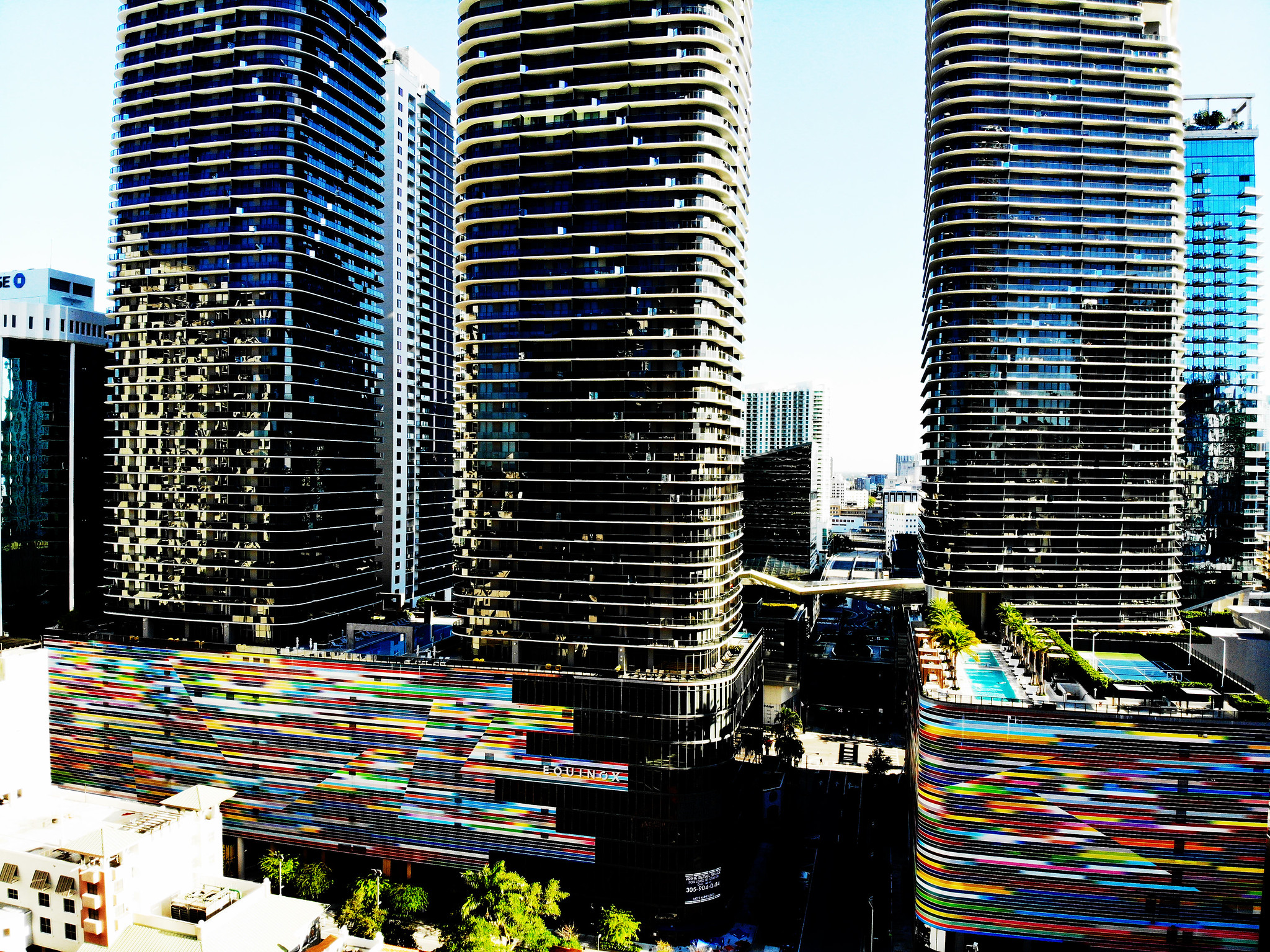

Brickell Heights are two twin towers in the Brickell neighborhood of Miami, Florida. Together, the towers have 690 units with a ground floor Equinox Gym. Ground for the towers was broken in 2014 following the groundbreaking of SLS Brickell. The project was originally announced as The Premiere Towers during the 2000s' building boom but was cancelled due to financial reasons caused by the Great Recession. The project was re-announced by Related in October 2013 as Brickell Heights. A third tower, SLS Lux, is across Miami Avenue to the east. The site is about one block north of the Tenth Street Metromover Station. The project is directly adjacent on the east side of a 1980s office building, the Brickell Bayview Center, which is now nearly surrounded by high rises.

== See also ==
- List of tallest buildings in Miami
