= SLS Brickell =

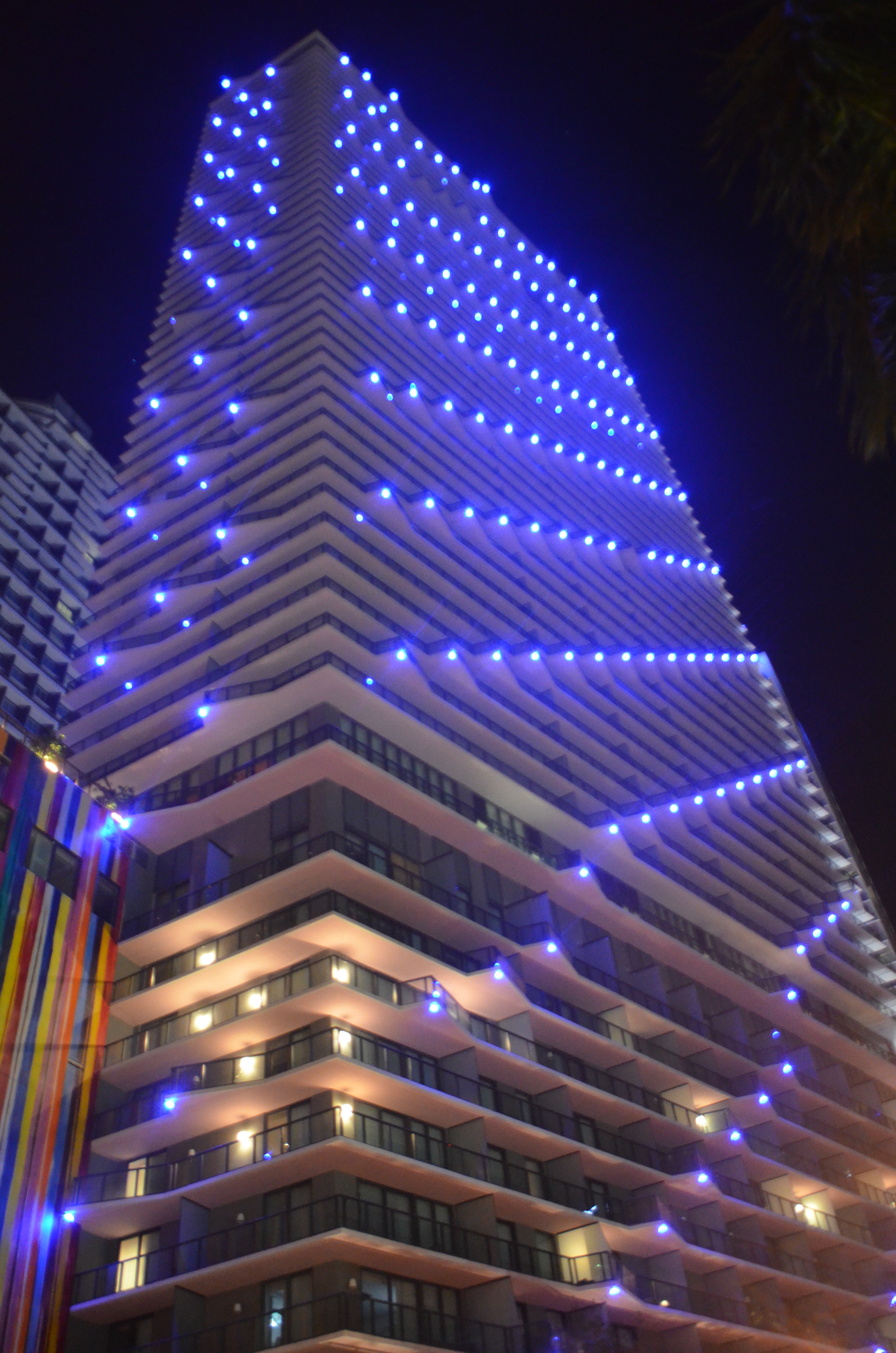
- Interactive map of the SLS Brickell area

General information
- Status: Completed
- Type: Hotel and condos
- Location: 1300 South Miami Avenue, Miami, Florida, United States
- Coordinates: 25.7611998°N 80.1936583°W
- Construction started: 2014
- Completed: 2016
- Owner: SBE Entertainment Group

Height
- Roof: 599 ft (183 m)

Technical details
- Floor count: 52

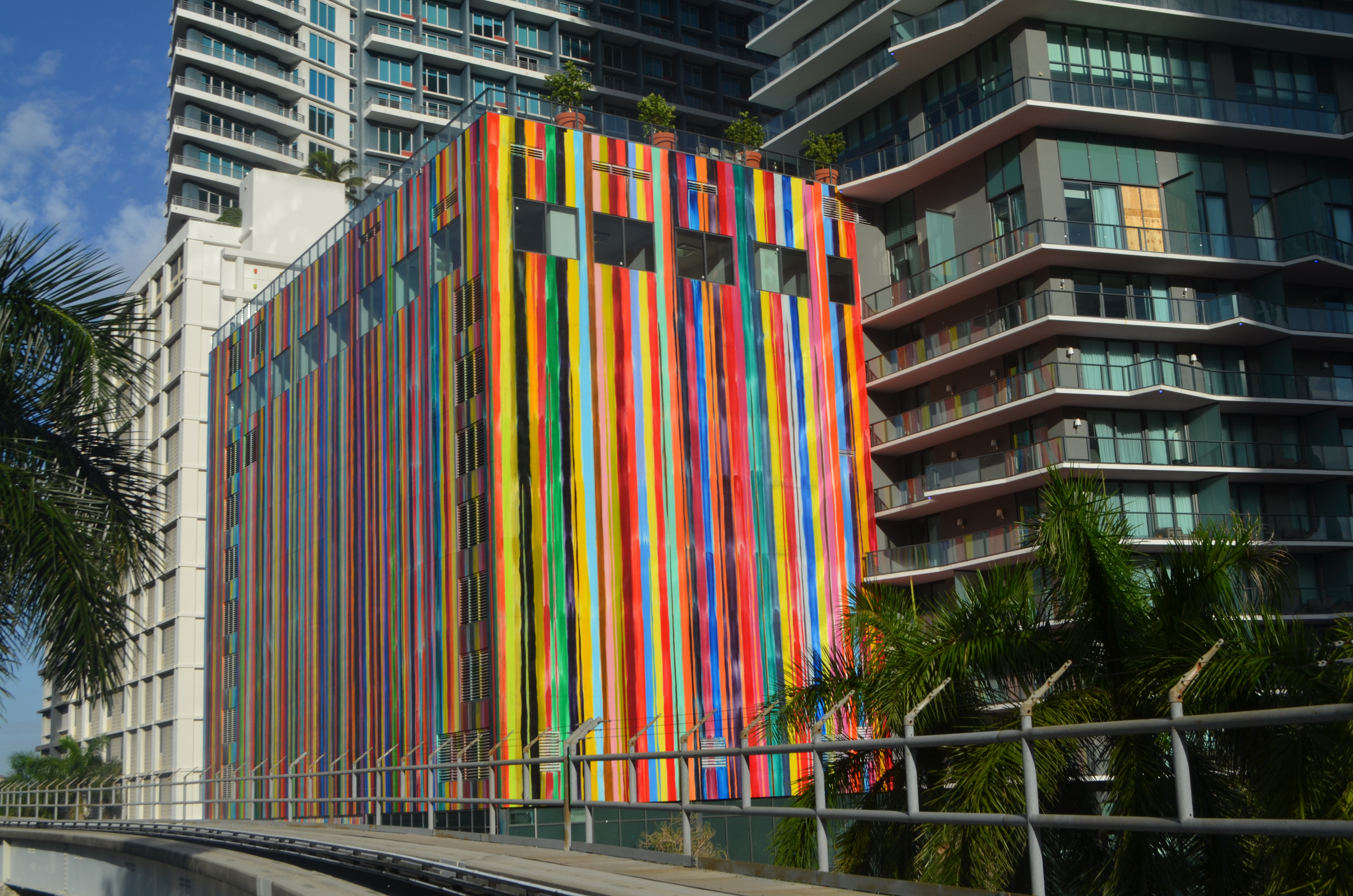
Parking garage mural

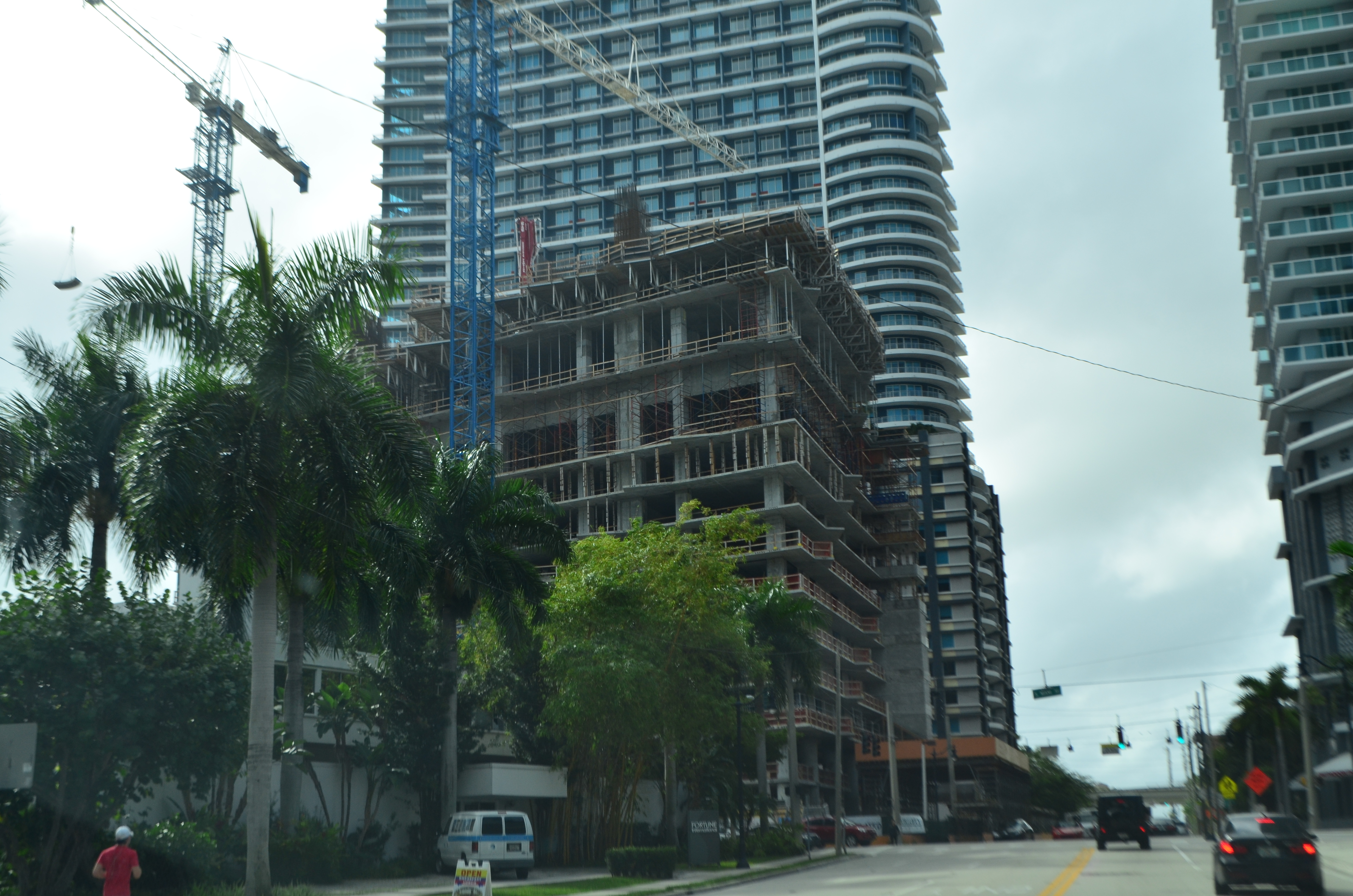
SLS Brickell under construction in 2014

The SLS Hotel & Residences Brickell is a high rise building in the Brickell district of Miami, Florida. The project includes 450 condominium units in addition to the 133 room hotel. With the exception of a few penthouses, the project sold out before breaking ground. The project is located at 1300 South Miami Avenue, next to the Infinity at Brickell; it replaces the second phase of that project. There is another SLS-branded building a few blocks north known as SLS Lux.

== See also ==
- List of tallest buildings in Miami
