= SLS Lux =

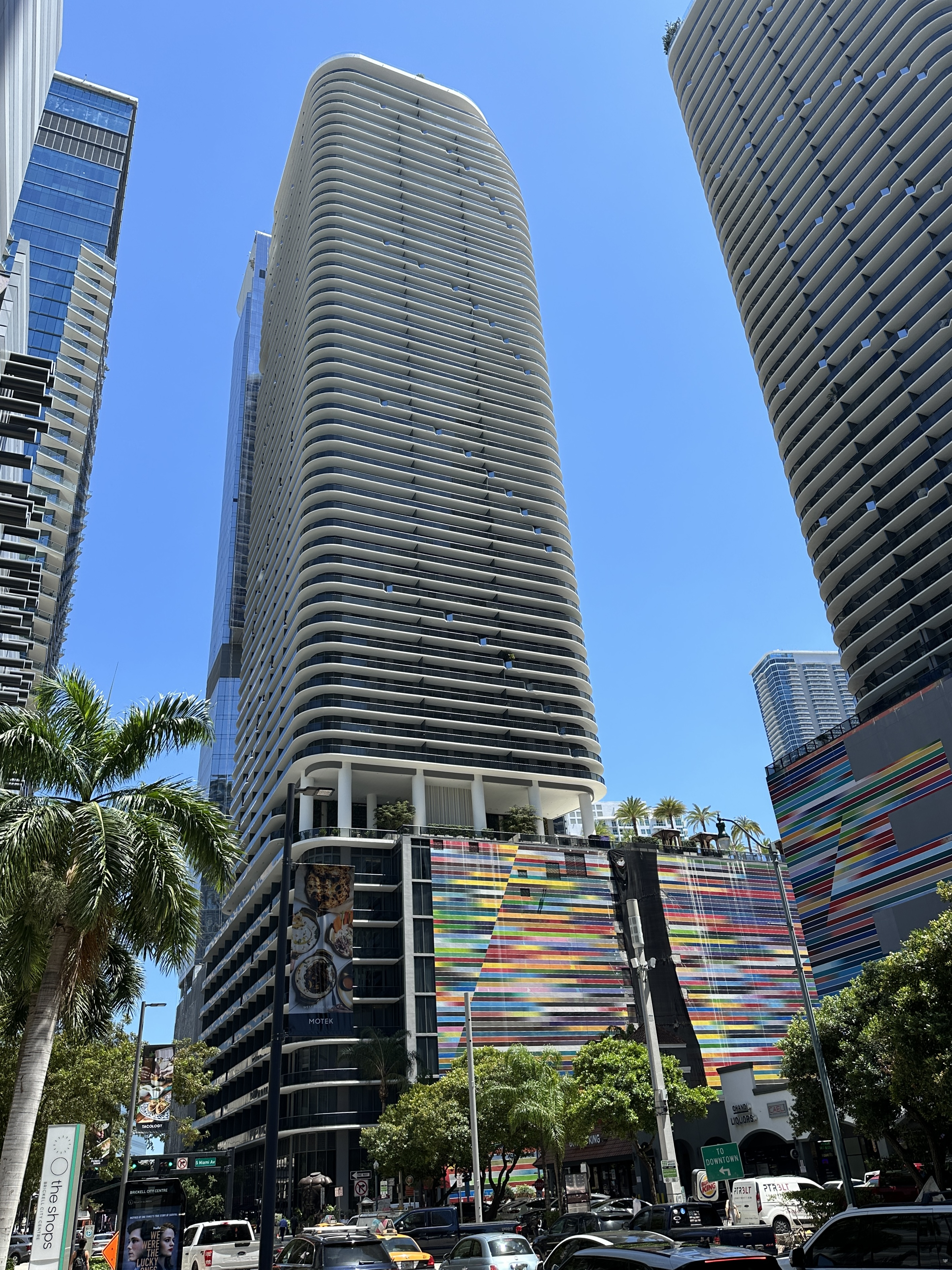
- Interactive map of the SLS Lux area

General information
- Status: Completed
- Type: Residential
- Location: 801 South Miami Avenue, Miami, Florida, United States
- Coordinates: 25°45′58″N 80°11′35″W
- Construction started: December 2014 (site works), 2015 (construction)
- Completed: April 2018
- Owner: 801 SMA Master Association, Inc.
- Management: KW Property Management & Consulting LLC.

Height
- Roof: 197.6 m (648 ft)

Technical details
- Floor count: 58
- Lifts/elevators: 10

Design and construction
- Architect: Arquitectonica
- Developer: Related Group

SLS Lux is a 58-story skyscraper luxury apartment building and hotel in the Brickell district of Greater Downtown Miami, Florida, United States.

The building consists of 438 condo units and 86 hotel-condo units set atop a parking pedestal. SLS Lux is located at South Miami Avenue and Southeast Eighth Street, across from Brickell City Centre, at 801 South Miami Avenue. It is regarded as one of the best apartment buildings in its neighborhood by residents, with an array of opulent features from marble flooring throughout the common areas, two rooftop pools, an on-site spa and gym, private elevators to each residence, top-of-the-line appliances, modern finishes and 24 hour security and valet service.

== History ==
Announced in 2014 as the third tower in the Brickell Heights development (although it is across South Miami Avenue), site work and ground construction began in 2014, with vertical construction commencing in July 2015, after receiving approval from the Federal Aviation Administration. Designed by Arquitectonica, the building was, at this time, expected to have 450 "residences" and 95 hotel units with a delivery of fall 2017. In September, when the Related Group secured a $166.1 million construction loan for the project, the number of hotel suites had shrunk to only 84; however, at this time additional amenities were announced including a tennis court, three pools, and a spa, with a bar and restaurant operated by SBE Entertainment.

By November 2015, the building had already been more than 95% leased, with only 24 units remaining un-leased. At that time, Related cut the required deposit from 50% to 30%, in an attempt to lease the final units faster.

== See also ==
- List of tallest buildings in Miami
