= Sieger Suárez Architectural Partnership =

Design firm based in Miami, USA

Sieger Suárez Architects
- Industry: Architecture
- Founded: 1998
- Key people: Charles Sieger, Founder and José J. Suárez
- Website: http://www.siegersuarez.com

Sieger Suárez Architects is a Miami based firm specializing in the diversified field of luxury high-rise residential design and development. It is jointly owned and managed by Charles M. Sieger and José J. Suárez.

The firm has designed in excess of US $10 billion worth of residential real estate properties. The firm is one of the pioneers of the "floor through see through" unit design, one of the most successful design concepts in the high-rise residential market. Most of its activities are in the Southeast United States.

It has a number of divisions devoted to a variety of branches of architecture in addition to marketing and advertising

== History ==
The Sieger Suárez Architects evolved from the firm formerly known as Charles M. Sieger Architects, Inc., which Sieger founded in 1974. In 1987 Charles Sieger entered into a partnership with José J. Suárez, who joined the firm in 1980. In 1998 the firm officially changed its name to The Sieger Suarez Architectural Partnership.

The firm stepped into development in 2003 with the formation of BSG Development Corporation. Partners Charles Sieger and José Suárez formed BSG by merging their design talents with real estate developer and CFO Javier Henriques.

== Corporate Clients ==
- Trump Organization
- Starwood (defunct)

== Selected projects ==
- Waldorf Astoria Miami, Miami
- Porsche Design Tower, Sunny Isles Beach
- 50 Biscayne, Miami
- St. Regis Resort Residences, Bal Harbour, Miami
- Brickell House
- Centro Lofts, Miami
- Trump Towers, Sunny Isles Beach
