= List of tallest buildings in Sunny Isles Beach =

Skyline of Sunny Isles Beach
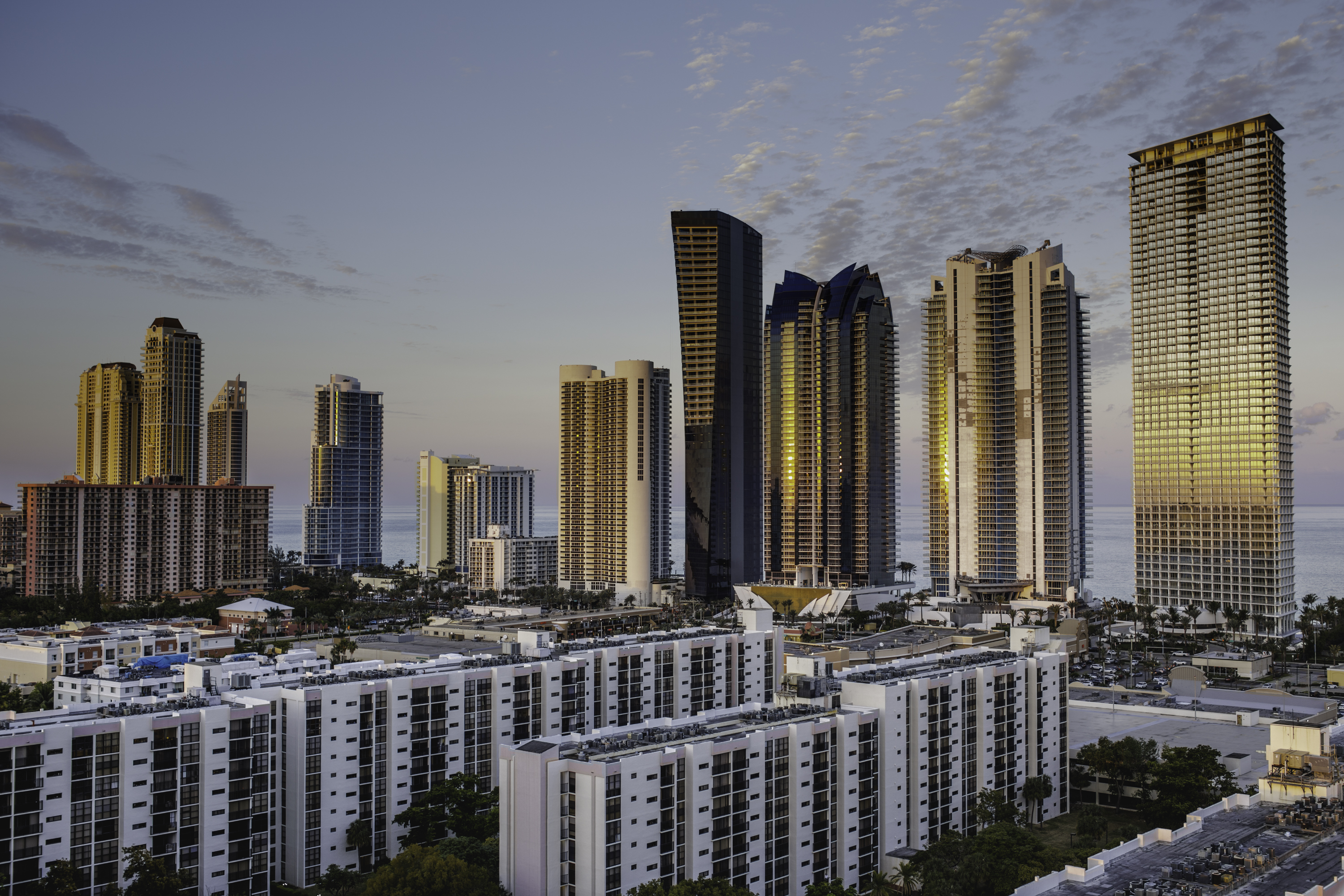
- Skyline in 2018 showing Jade Signature, Jade Beach, Jade Ocean, and Muse.

Number of tall buildings (2025)
- Taller than 100 m (328 ft): 30
- Taller than 150 m (492 ft): 17
- Taller than 200 m (656 ft): 2

Number of tall buildings — feet
- Taller than 300 ft (91.4 m): 35

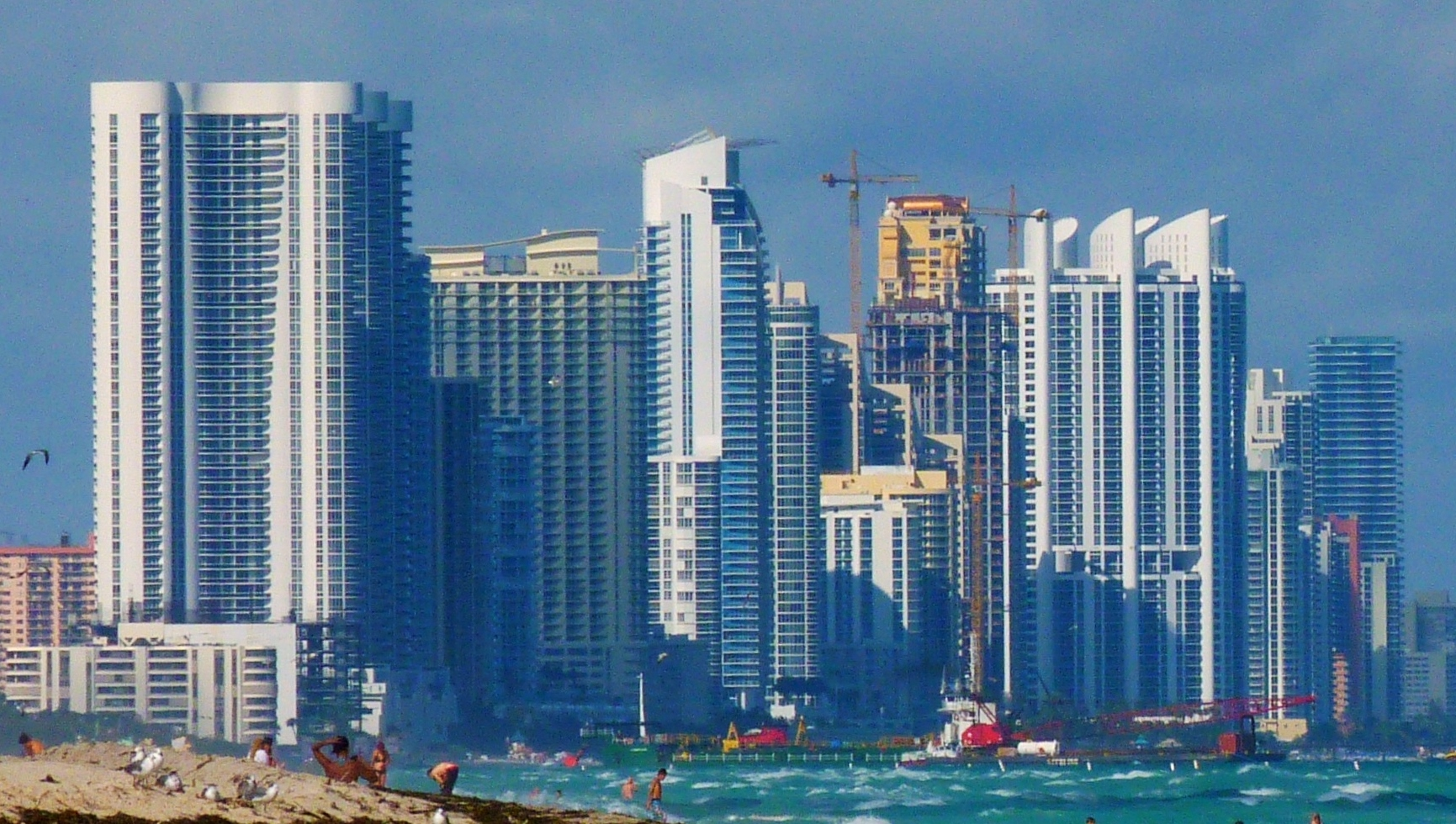
Skyline of Sunny Isles Beach from the south in 2013.

Sunny Isles Beach is a city in the U.S. state of Florida, located in the northeast corner of Miami-Dade County. Part of the Miami metropolitan area, Sunny Isles Beach is a small 1.01-square-mile (2.6 km^{2}), geographically constrained city between the Atlantic Ocean and the Intracoastal Waterway at the northern end of Biscayne Bay situated approximately halfway between Miami and Fort Lauderdale. High-rise construction was spurred in part by coastal tourism demand in this already densely developed area. Despite the small size, Sunny Isles Beach ranks as the U.S. city with the fourteenth-most buildings exceeding heights of 500 feet (150 m) and the city in South Florida with the fifth-most high-rise buildings, following Miami, Miami Beach, Fort Lauderdale, and neighboring Aventura.

Sunny Isles Beach had very few skyscrapers until the 2000s, when many were constructed on the east side of Collins Avenue, on the beach adjacent to the Atlantic Ocean. This strip historically consisted of a row of low rise hotels known as "Motel Row", mostly developed midcentury in the MiMo architectural style. Even among high-rises, the oldest such structures in the city only date to the 1960s. The wall of skyscrapers spans nearly the entire length of the city longitudinally, from the Ritz-Carlton Residences located near the border of Haulover Park to the south to Regalia located adjacent to the border of Golden Beach to the north, which has strict single family residential zoning.

Much of the development since 2000 has been led by Michael Dezer who has looked to build high-end residential buildings with branding licensed from prominent companies, such as Trump, Porsche, Ritz-Carlton, Armani, and Bentley. Some towers have been not only branded after car manufacturers but have incorporated car elevators that leading to "sky garages" with parking spaces next to residences within the tower Branding increases attractiveness to buyers and means units sell at higher prices, while the luxury construction and architectural design of some towers such as the Jade Signature have received architectural awards.

Most skyscrapers in Sunny Isles Beach are residential, with a few supporting hotels and restaurants; all of them are primarily concrete structurally. In general, the tallest height limit imposed by the Federal Aviation Administration (FAA) in Sunny Isles Beach is 649 ft (198 m) Above Mean Sea Level (AMSL), due to the proximity of Miami-Opa Locka Executive Airport to the west. Several towers rise to exactly this height, though the FAA reviews each building individually and some of the most recently completed and proposed towers exceed this height.

== Tallest buildings ==
This list ranks completed skyscrapers and high-rises in Sunny Isles Beach that stand at least 300 ft (91 m) tall as of 2025, based on standard height measurement. This includes spires and architectural details but does not include antenna masts. The “Year” column indicates the year of completion. Buildings tied in height are sorted by year of completion, and then alphabetically. All skyscrapers in the city are located on the east side of Collins Avenue. Height given may be height above sea level (AMSL), which adds about 6 feet (2 m).

Rank	Name	Image	Address	Height ft (m)	Floors	Year	Purpose	Notes
1	Estates at Acqualina South		17875 Collins	672 (204.8)	52	2022	Residential	Adjacent to Estates at Aqualina North. The two buildings are the tallest in Sunny Isles Beach.
2	Estates at Acqualina North	–	17875 Collins	672 (204.8)	52	2023	Residential	Adjacent to Estates at Aqualina South. The two buildings are the tallest in Sunny Isles Beach.
3	Muse		17141 Collins	649 (197.8)	47	2018	Residential	
4	Turnberry Ocean Club Residences	–	18501 Collins	649 (197.8)	52	2020	Residential	
5	Mansions at Acqualina		17749 Collins	643 (196)	46	2015	Residential	Image shows building topped out in 2015 on the right, adjacent to Acqualina Ocean Residences.
6	Porsche Design Tower		18555 Collins	641 (195.4)	57	2016	Residential	Features a robotic car parking system, which bring vehicles up to each unit.
7	Ritz-Carlton Residences		15701 Collins	640 (195.1)	52	2020	Residential	Located one property away from southern border of city.
8	Residences by Armani Casa		18975 Collins	639 (194.7)	55	2019	Residential	
9	Jade Signature		16901 Collins	636 (193.9)	57	2017	Residential	
10	Jade Beach		17001 Collins	574 (175)	51	2008	Residential	Right tower in photo.
11	Trump Palace		18101 Collins	551 (168)	43	2005	Residential	
12	Acqualina Resort & Spa		17875 Collins	550 (167.6)	51	2004	Residential	Named the best hotel in the U.S. in 2023.
13	Trump Royale		18201 Collins	550 (167.6)	43	2008	Residential	Almost identical to adjacent Trump Palace.
14	Jade Ocean		17121 Collins	545 (166)	51	2009	Residential	
15	Trump Towers I		16001 Collins	500 (152)	45	2008	Residential	One of three identical adjacent towers. Planning documents confirm the height of the three Trump Towers as 500 feet (152 m).
16	Trump Towers II		15911 Collins	500 (152)	45	2008	Residential	One of three identical adjacent towers.
17	Trump Towers III		15811 Collins	500 (152)	45	2008	Residential	One of three identical adjacent towers.
18	Regalia		19575 Collins	485 (147.8)	43	2015	Residential	
19	The Pinnacle		17555 Collins	476 (145.1)	40	1998	Residential	Features a prominent spire.
20	Chateau Beach Residences		17475 Collins	449 (136.8)	34	2015	Residential	
21	La Perla Ocean Residences	–	16699 Collins	447 (136.3)	42	2006	Residential	
22	Turnberry Ocean Colony North Tower	–	16051 Collins	430 (131)	37	2007	Residential	
23	Turnberry Ocean Colony South Tower	–	16051 Collins	430 (131)	37	2008	Residential	
24	Ocean Two Condominiums I	–	19111 Collins	426 (129.8)	40	2001	Residential	
25	Ocean Two Condominiums II	–	19111 Collins	426 (129.8)	40	2001	Residential	
26	Ocean Three Condominiums	–	18911 Collins	405 (123.4)	37	2003	Residential	
27	Ocean 4	–	17201 Collins	403 (122.8)	40	2006	Residential	
28	The Millennium	–	18671 Collins	380 (115.8)	36	1998	Residential	
29	Trump International Beach Resort		18001 Collins	351 (107)	32	2004	Mixed-use	Mixed-use residential and hotel building.
30	Parque Towers at St. Tropez A	–	330 Sunny Isles Boulevard	328 (100) (Note: Sources do not state the exact height of this building. This figure was determined using Google Earth by subtracting the altitude of the building’s main entrance from its highest architectural point.)	27	2017	Residential	
31	Ocean Island V	–	16420 Collins	324 (99)	30	1990	Residential	
32	Ocean Island IV	–	16400 Collins	320 (98)	29	1995	Residential	
33	Sayan Condominium	–	16275 Collins	319 (97.3)	30	2006	Residential	
34	Ocean One Condominums I	–	19333 Collins	315 (96)	30	1999	Residential	
35	Ocean One Condominums II	–	19333 Collins	315 (96)	30	1999	Residential	

== Tallest under construction and proposed ==
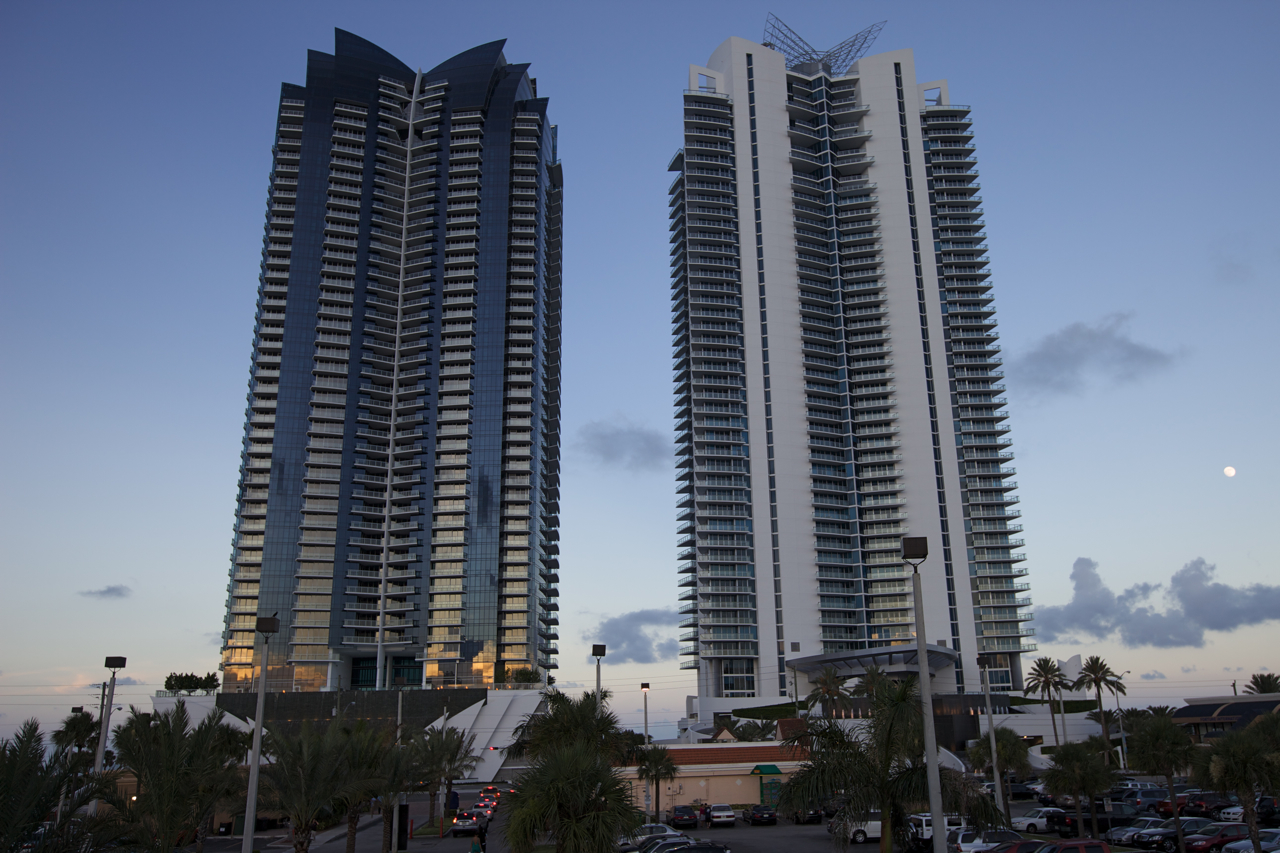
The discrepancy between the height measurement of Jade Beach and Jade Ocean may be explained by the fact that the entrance to Jade Ocean is elevated.

=== Under construction ===
Includes buildings between the foundation work and topped-out phases. Topped-out buildings may be included in the main list.

Rank	Name	Image	Height ft (m)	Floors	Year	Address	Notes
1=	Bentley Residences		749 (229)	63	2026	18401 Collins	Construction began in 2023 and will be the tallest oceanfront building in the U.S. Will have car elevators like the nearby Porsche Design Tower.
1=	St Regis Residences Tower 1		750 (229)	62	2026	18801 Collins	Completion is expected in 2026; will have photovoltaic glass
1=	St Regis Residences Tower 2		750 (229)	62	2026	18801 Collins	Completion is expected in 2026; will have photovoltaic glass

=== Proposed ===
Rank	Name	Image	Height ft (m)	Floors	Year	Address	Notes
1	The Related Group Tower		820 (250)	TBA	TBA	19051 Collins	So far, The Related Group is on a deal to buy the property for the price of $145 million. In August 2025, the FAA approved a height of up to 820 feet (250 m), which would make it the tallest building in Florida outside of the city of Miami.

== Timeline of tallest buildings ==
This lists buildings that once held the title of tallest building in Sunny Isles Beach. If multiple buildings reached the same height, only the first to reach that height is listed.

Name	Image	Street address	Years as tallest	Height ft (m)	Floors	Reference
The Pinnacle		17555 Collins	1998–2004	476 (145)	40	
Acqualina Resort & Spa		17875 Collins	2004–2008	550 (168)	51	
Jade on the Beach		17001 Collins	2008–2015	574 (175)	51	
Mansions at Acqualina		17749 Collins	2015–2018	643 (196)	46	
Muse		17141 Collins	2018–2022	649 (198)	47	
Estates at Acqualina South		17875 Collins	2022–present	672 (205)	52	

== Gallery ==
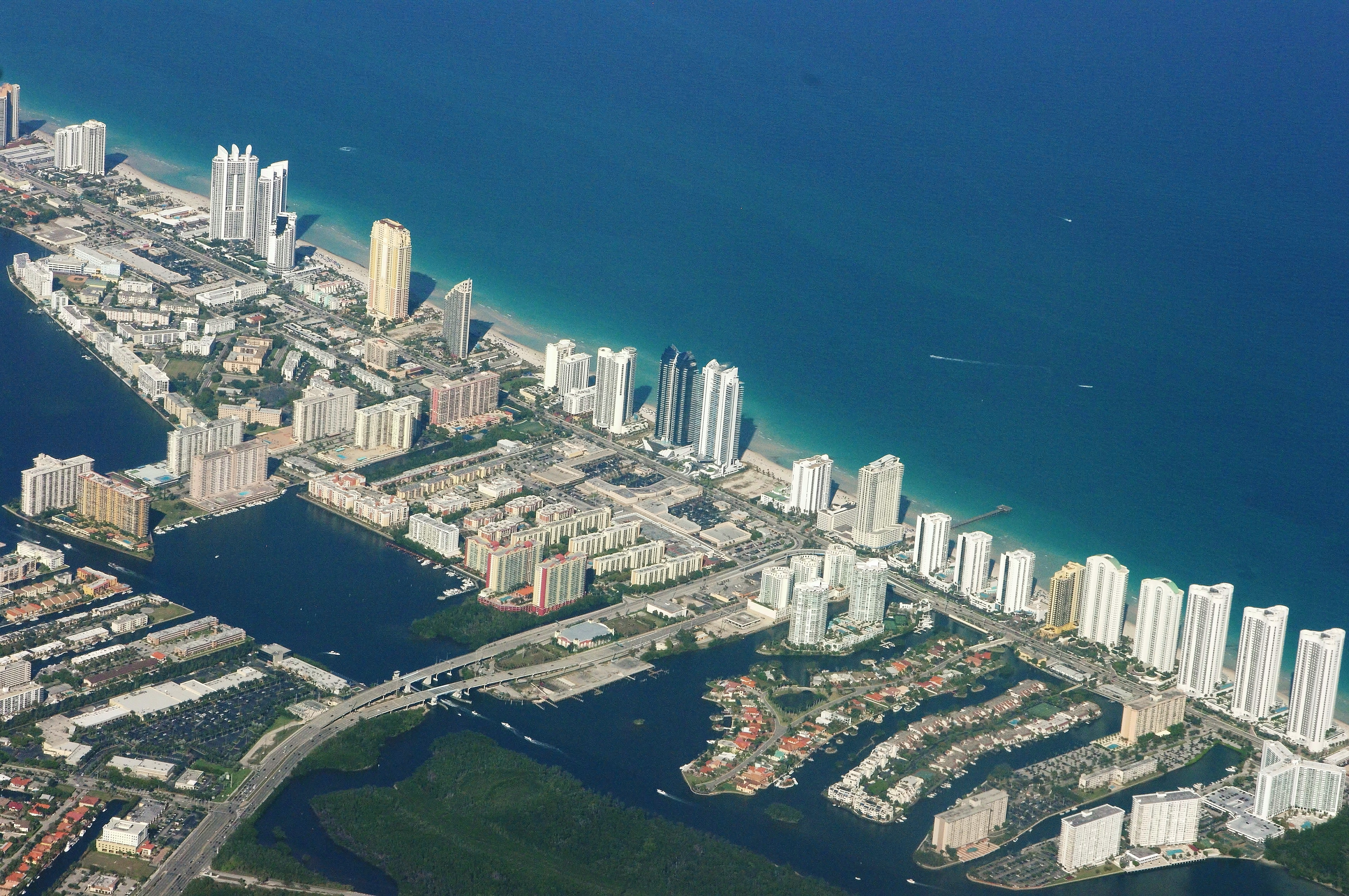
Viewed from an airplane in 2011.

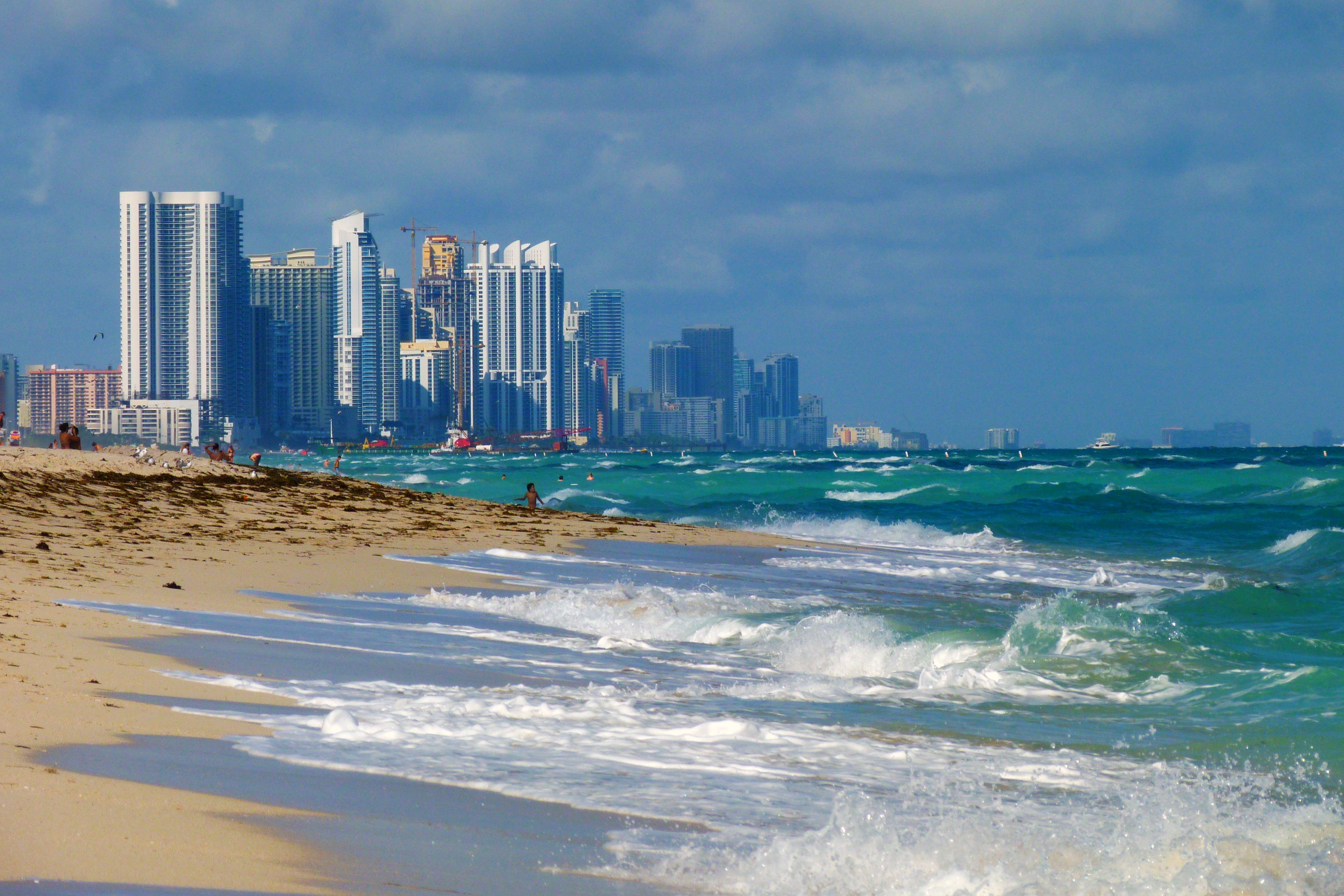
Skyline of Sunny Isles Beach viewed from the south with the skyline of southern coastal Broward County shown in the background in 2013.

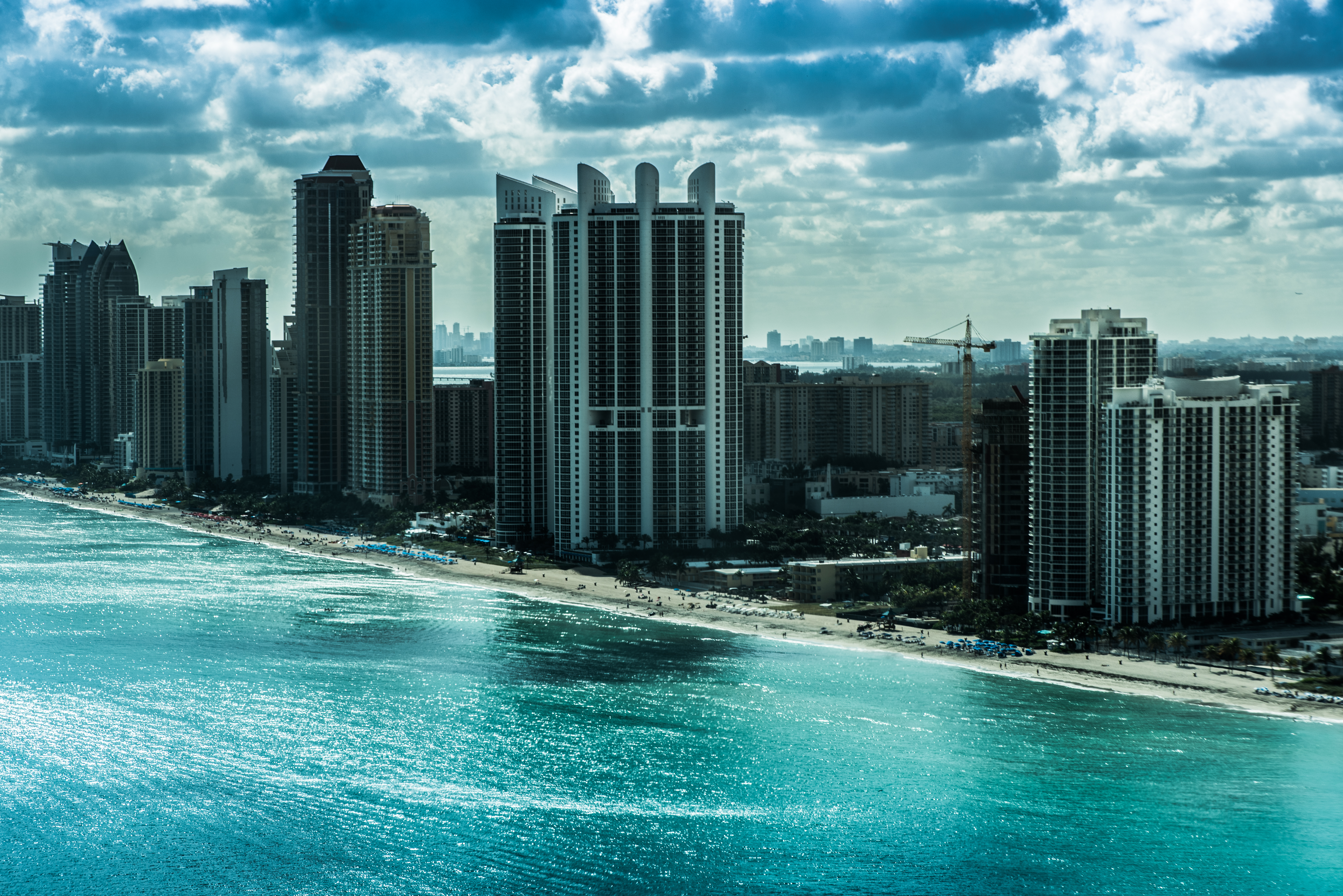
An aerial skyline photograph of the city in 2014.

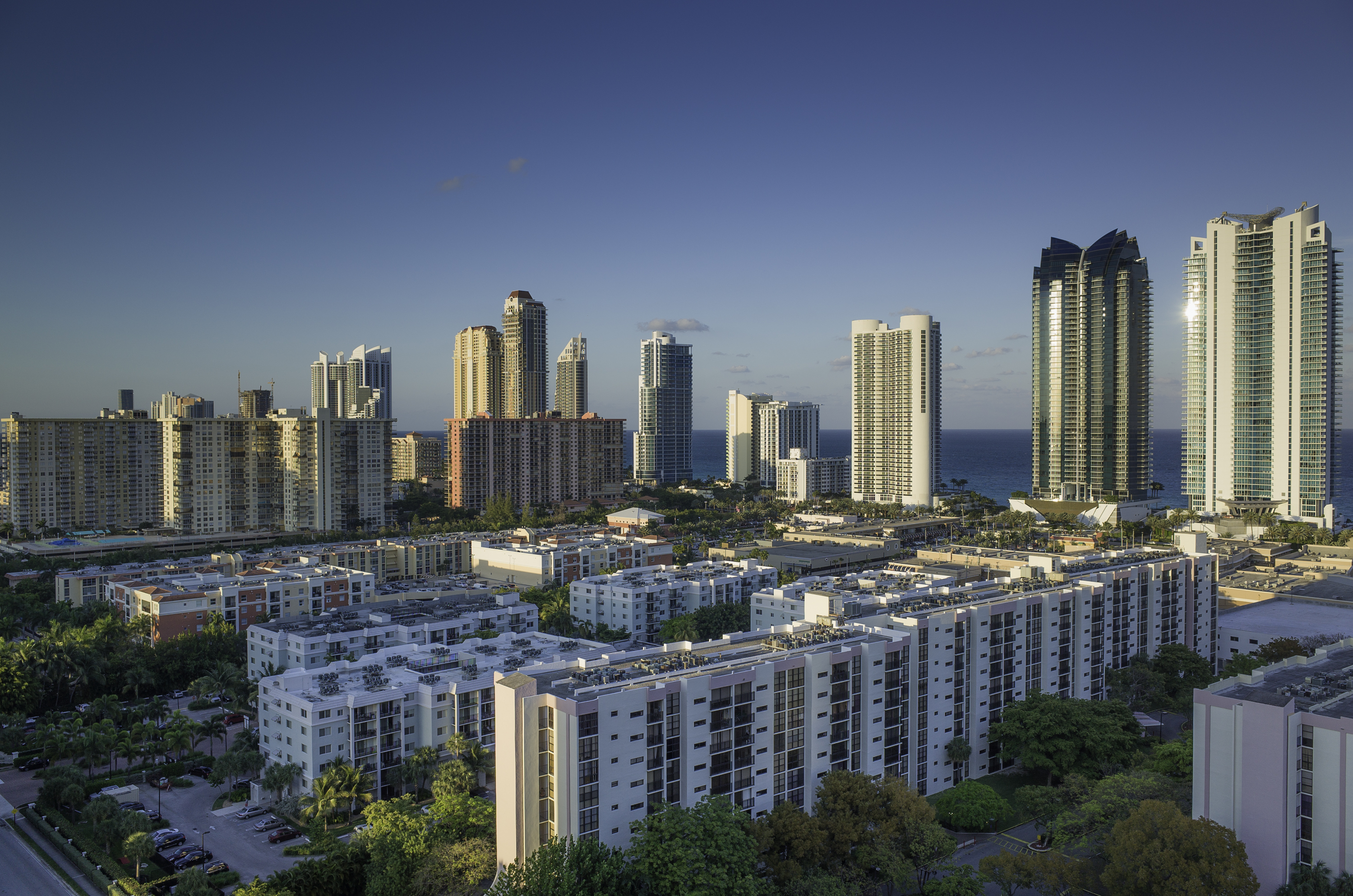
Skyline from the West in 2015. On the left side of the photo some of the oldest high rises in the city, dating to the 1960s and 1970s, can be seen.

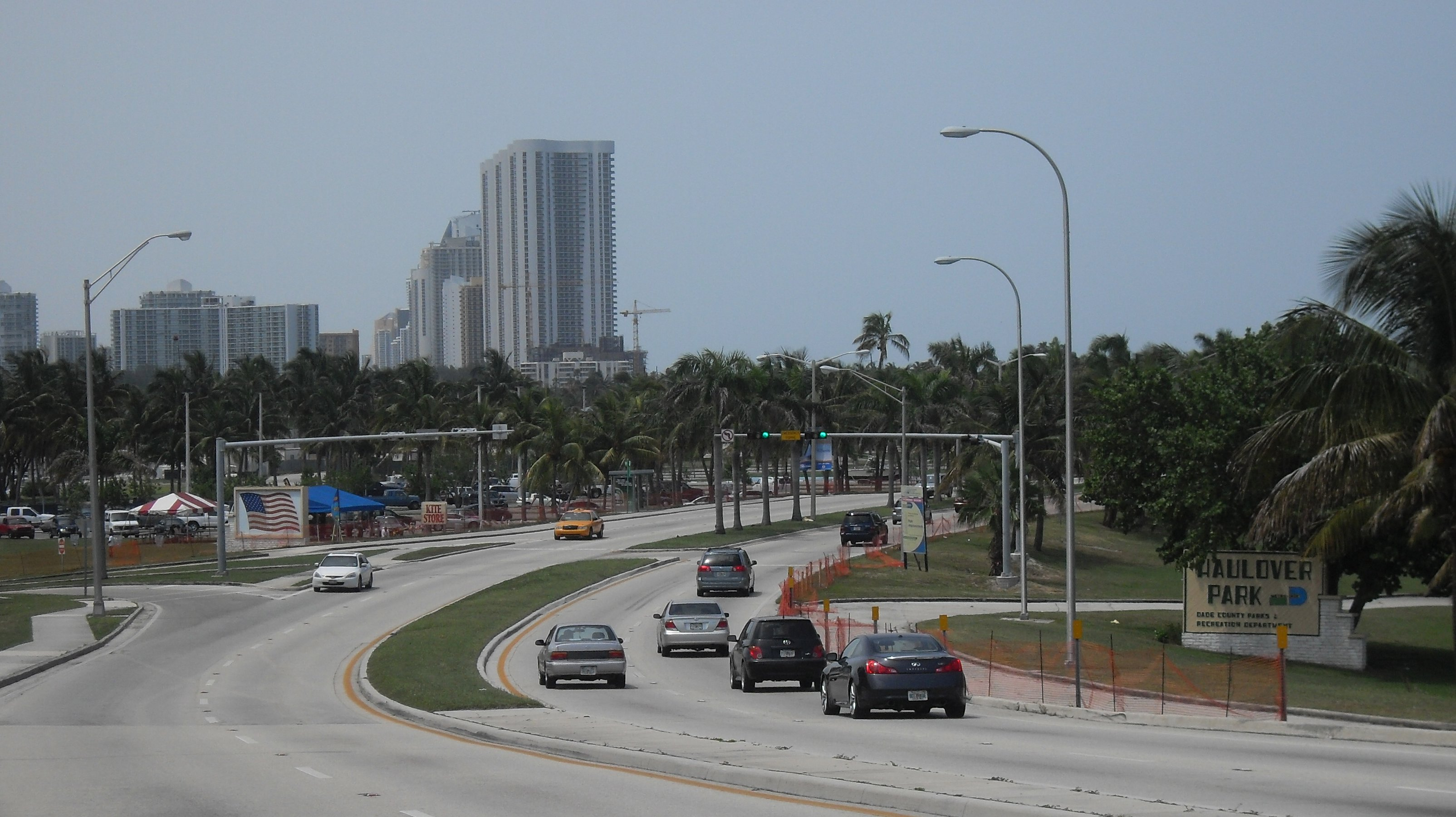
View from A1A (Collins Avenue) north in 2009.

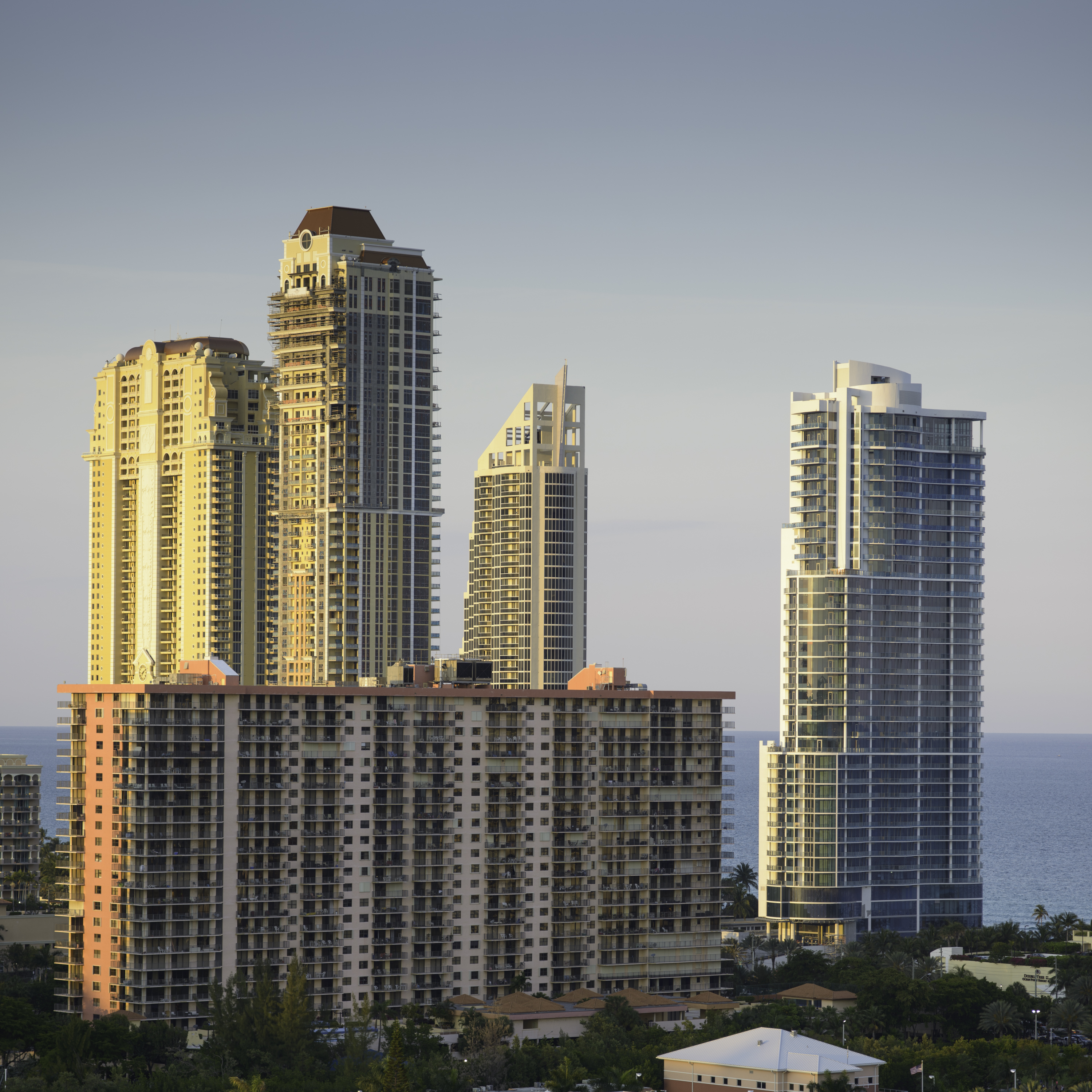
Mansions at Acqualina, the tallest building in the city when constructed in 2015, stands higher than its neighbors.

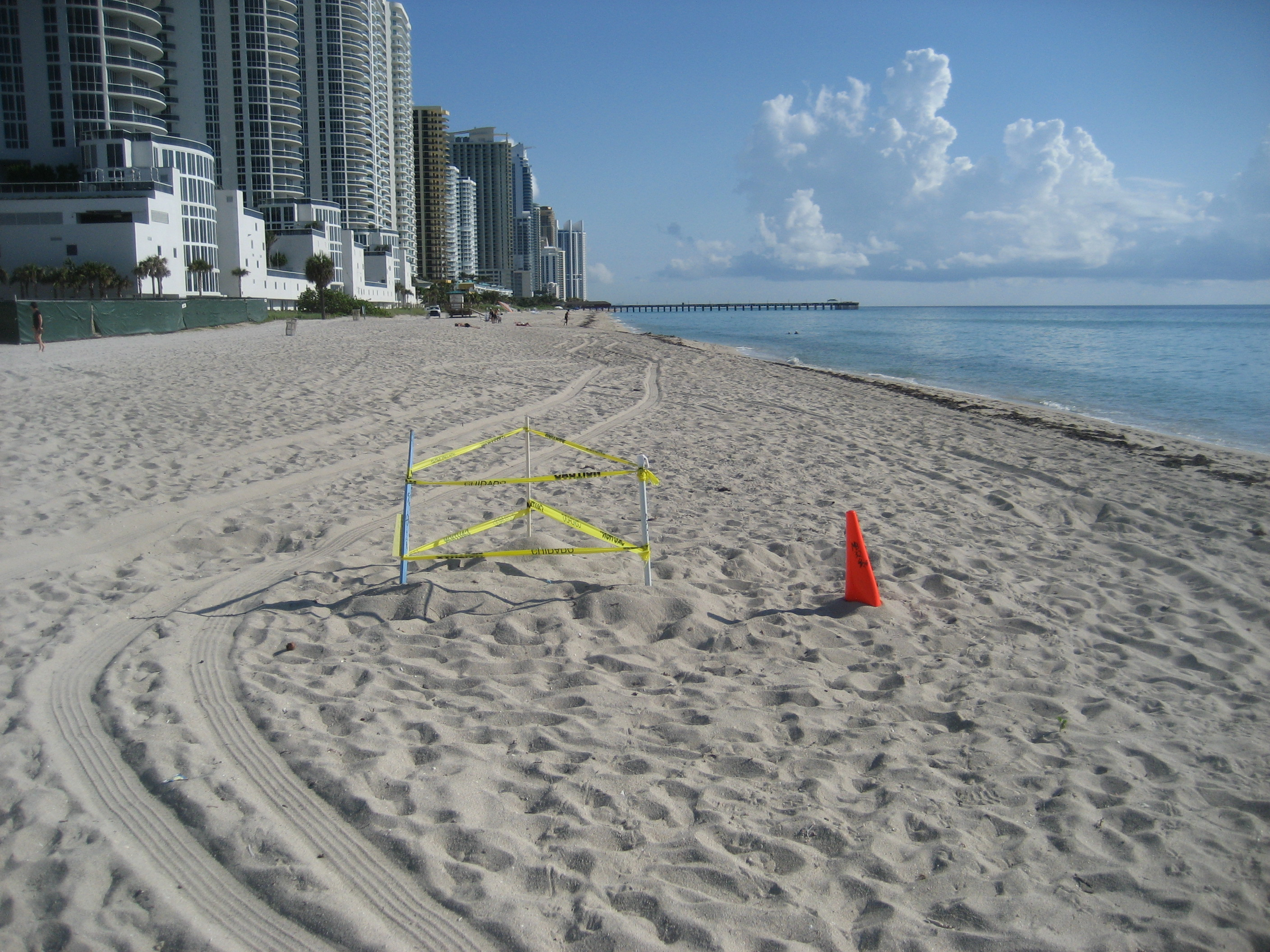
Sea turtle nest cone protected in 2010.

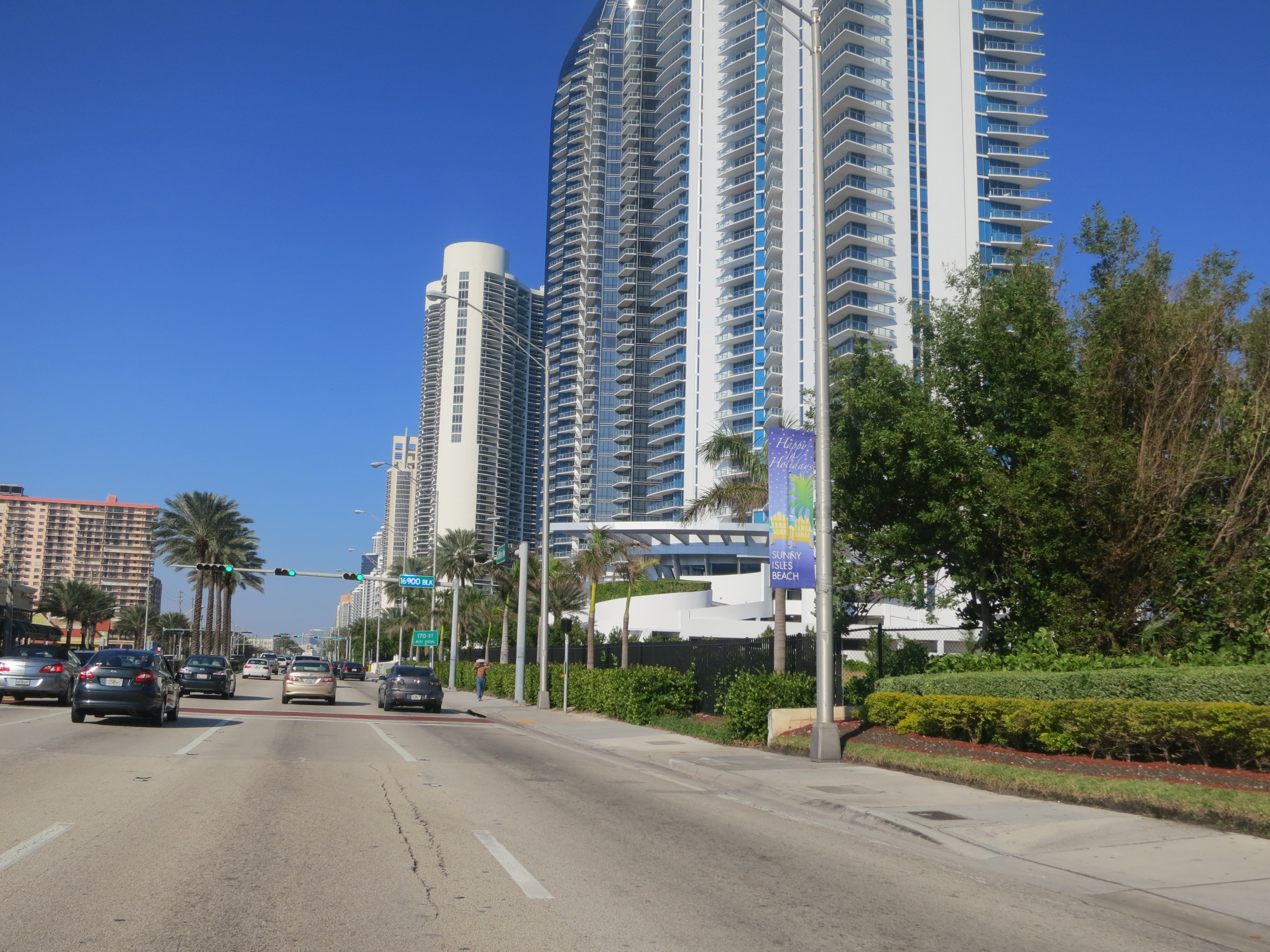
The street of Collins Ave on Sunny Isles Beach in 2012.

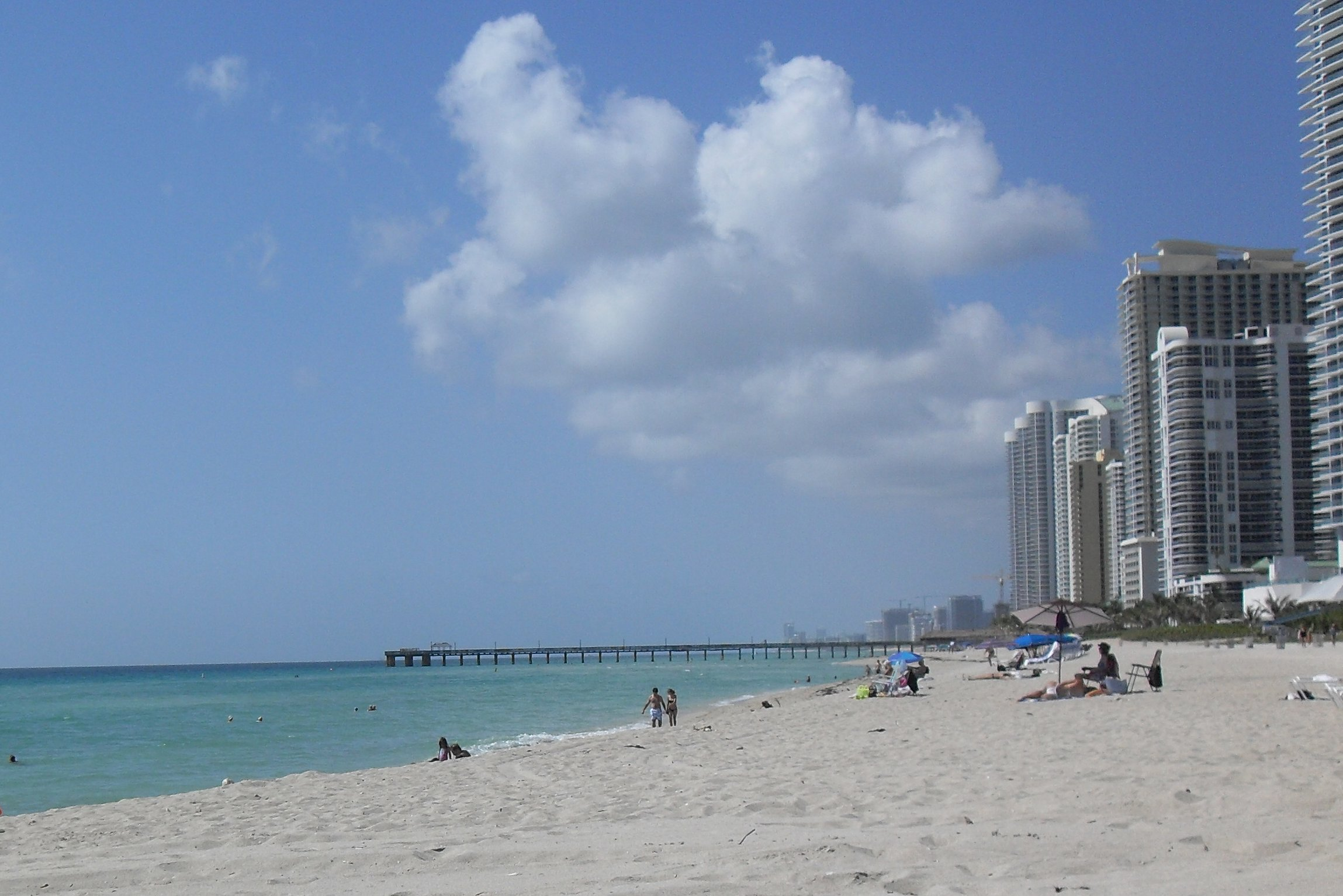
The beach view and shore in 2009.

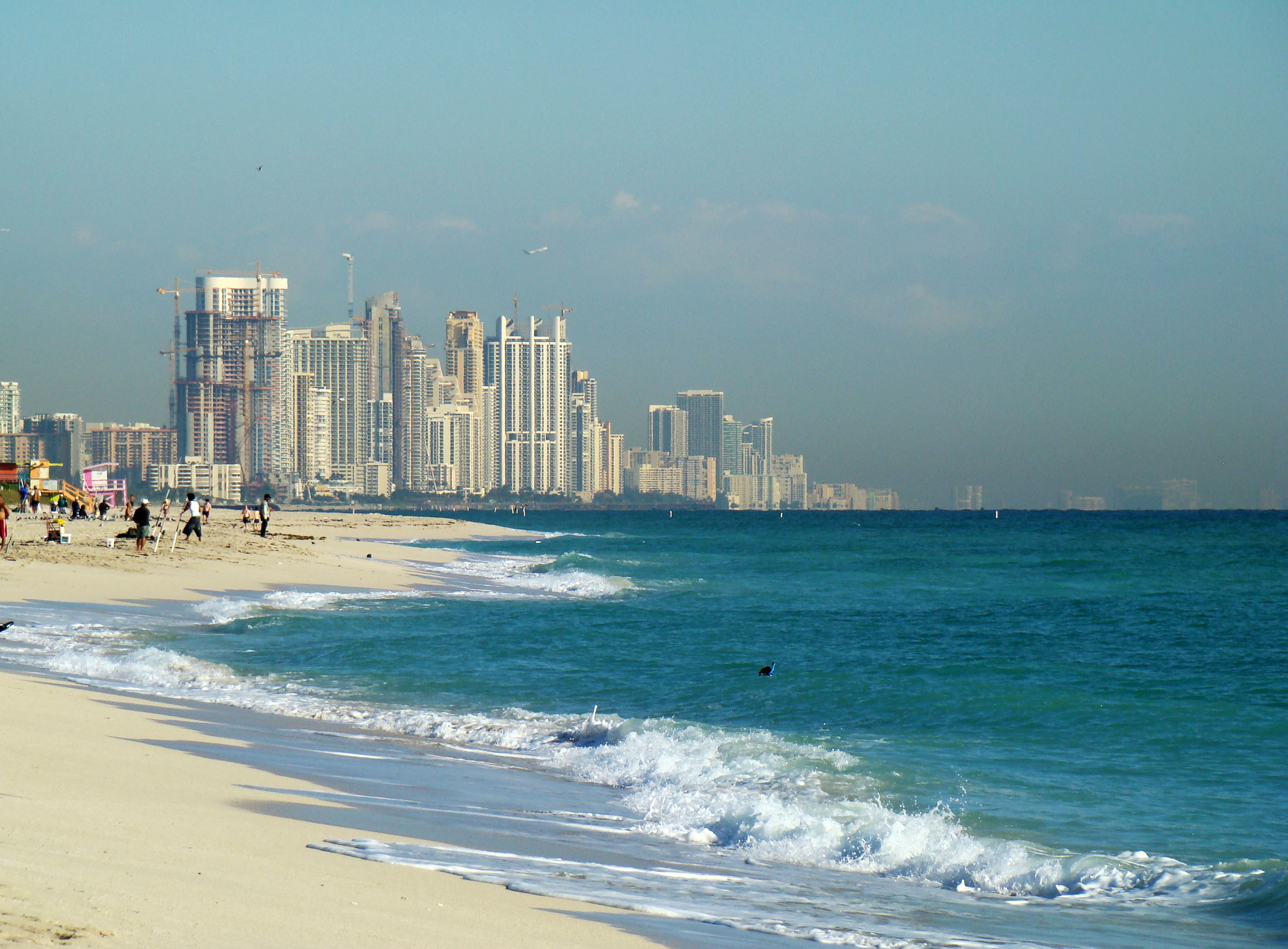
More view of the skyline from the south in 2007.

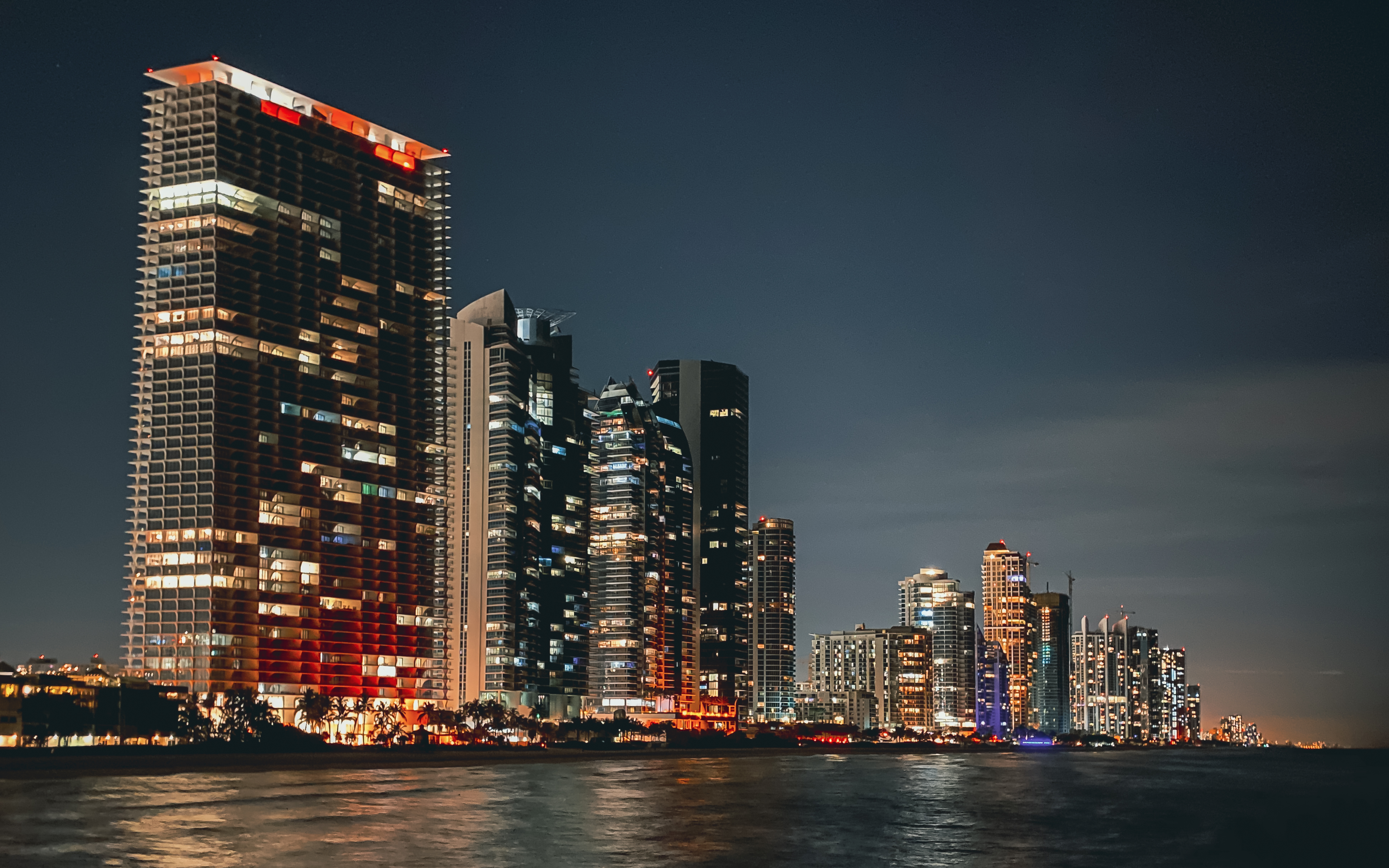
More modern time of the skyline at night in 2020.

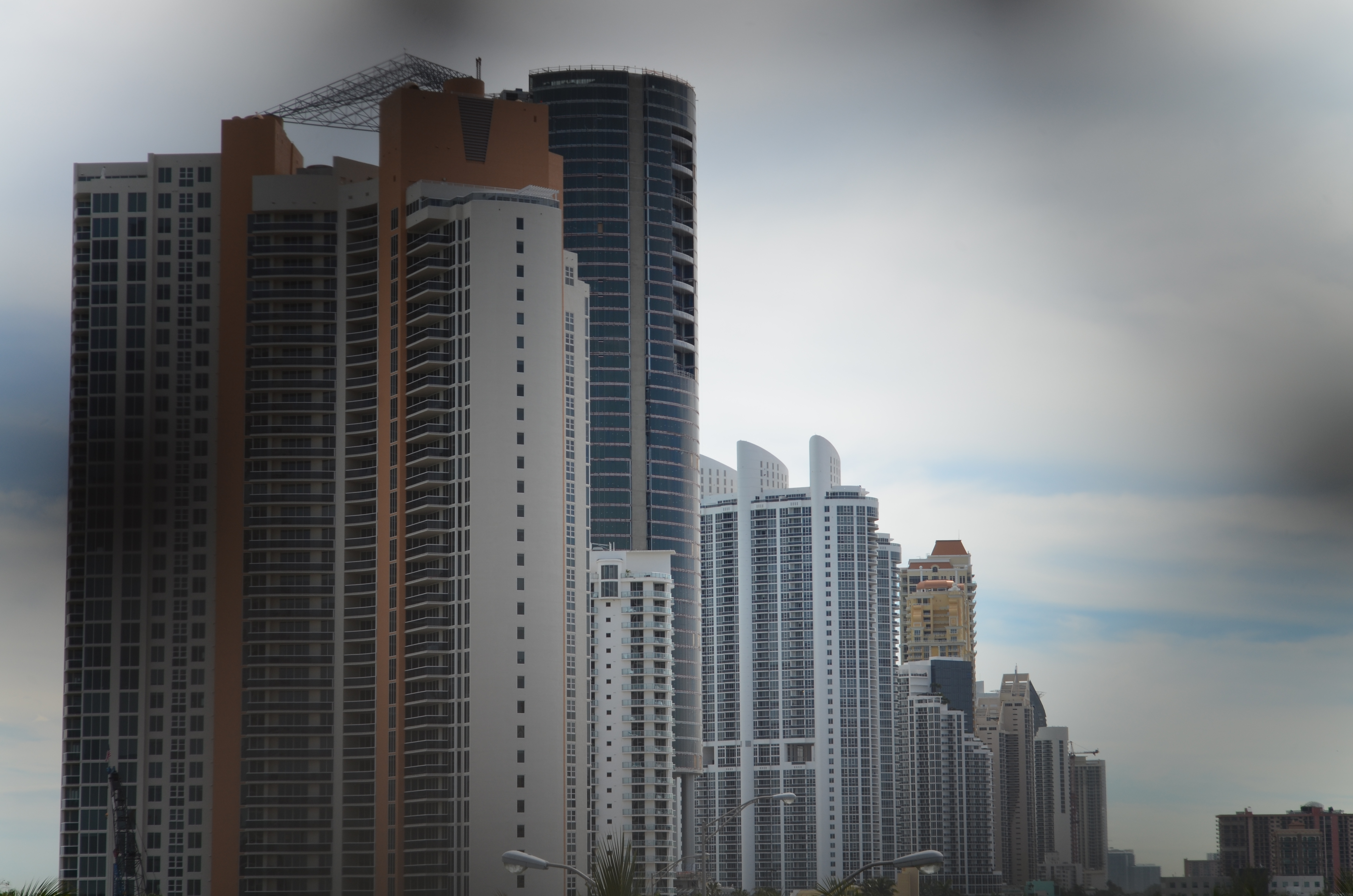
A line of Sunny Isles Beach's high rise in 2016.

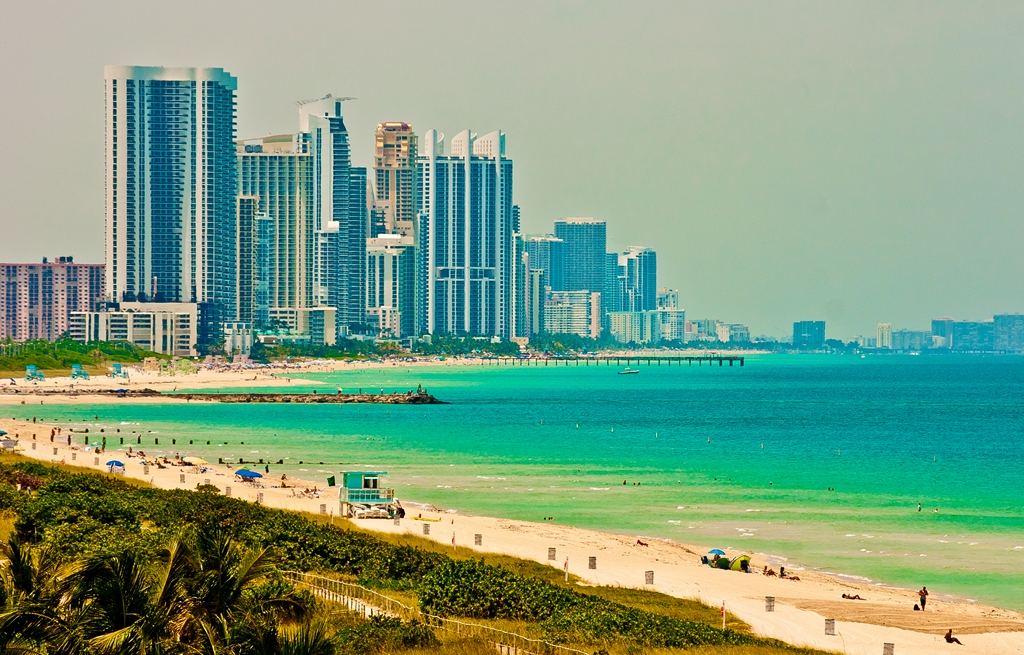
The skyline showing its colors in 2011.

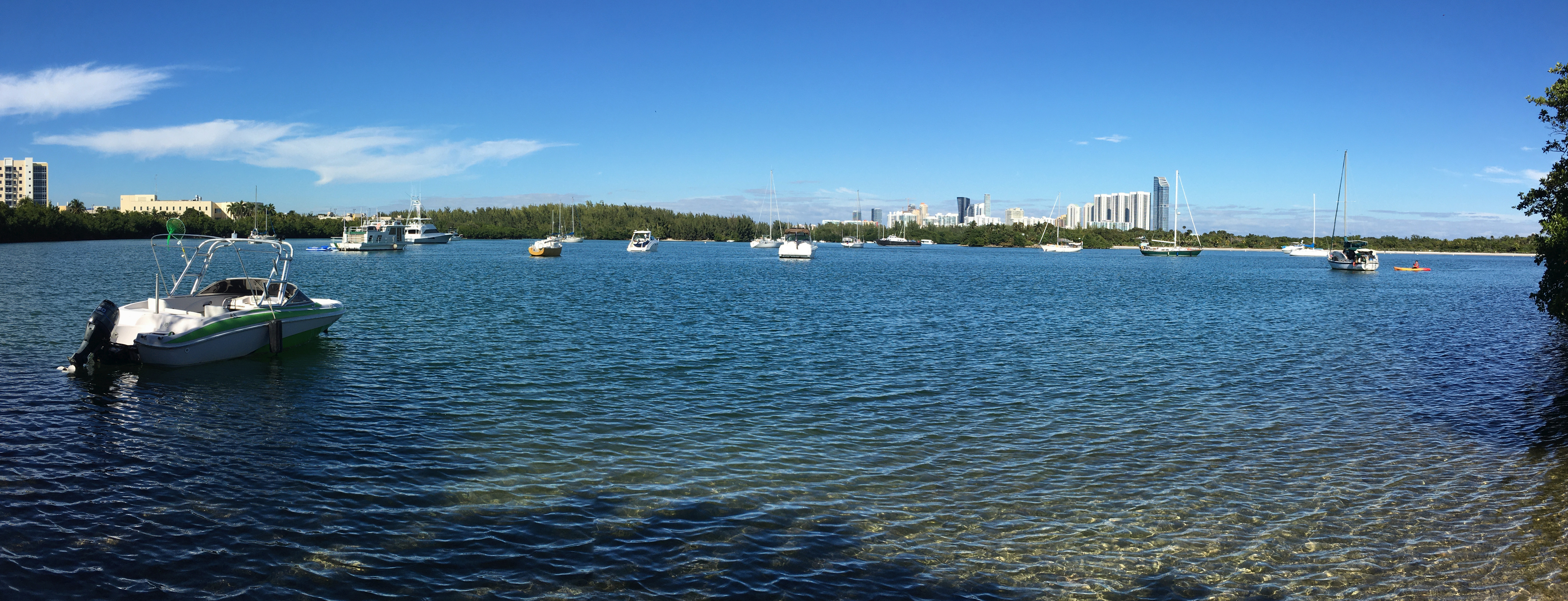
View of the skyline from the bay in 2020.

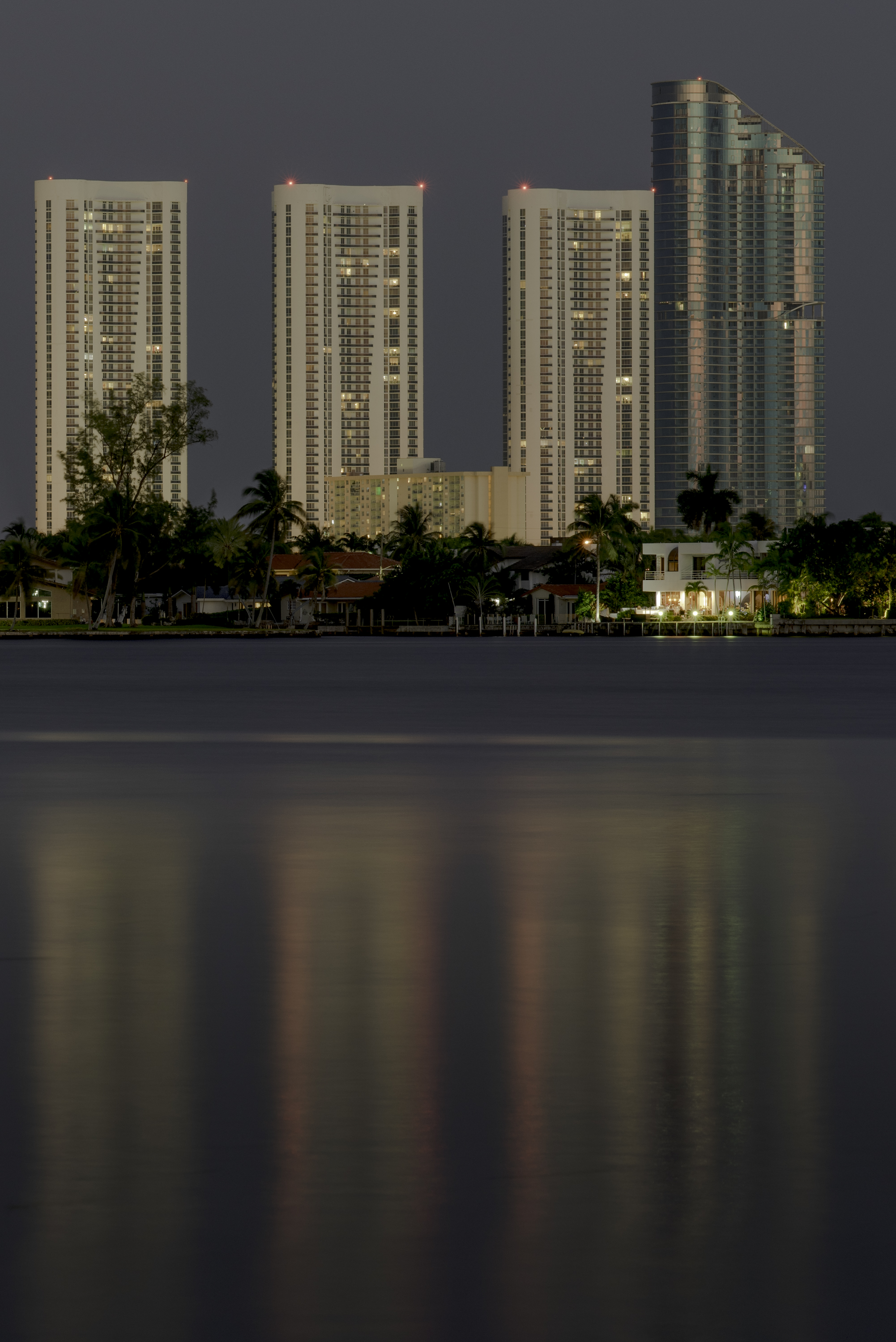
South of the Sunny Isles Beach skyline in 2019.

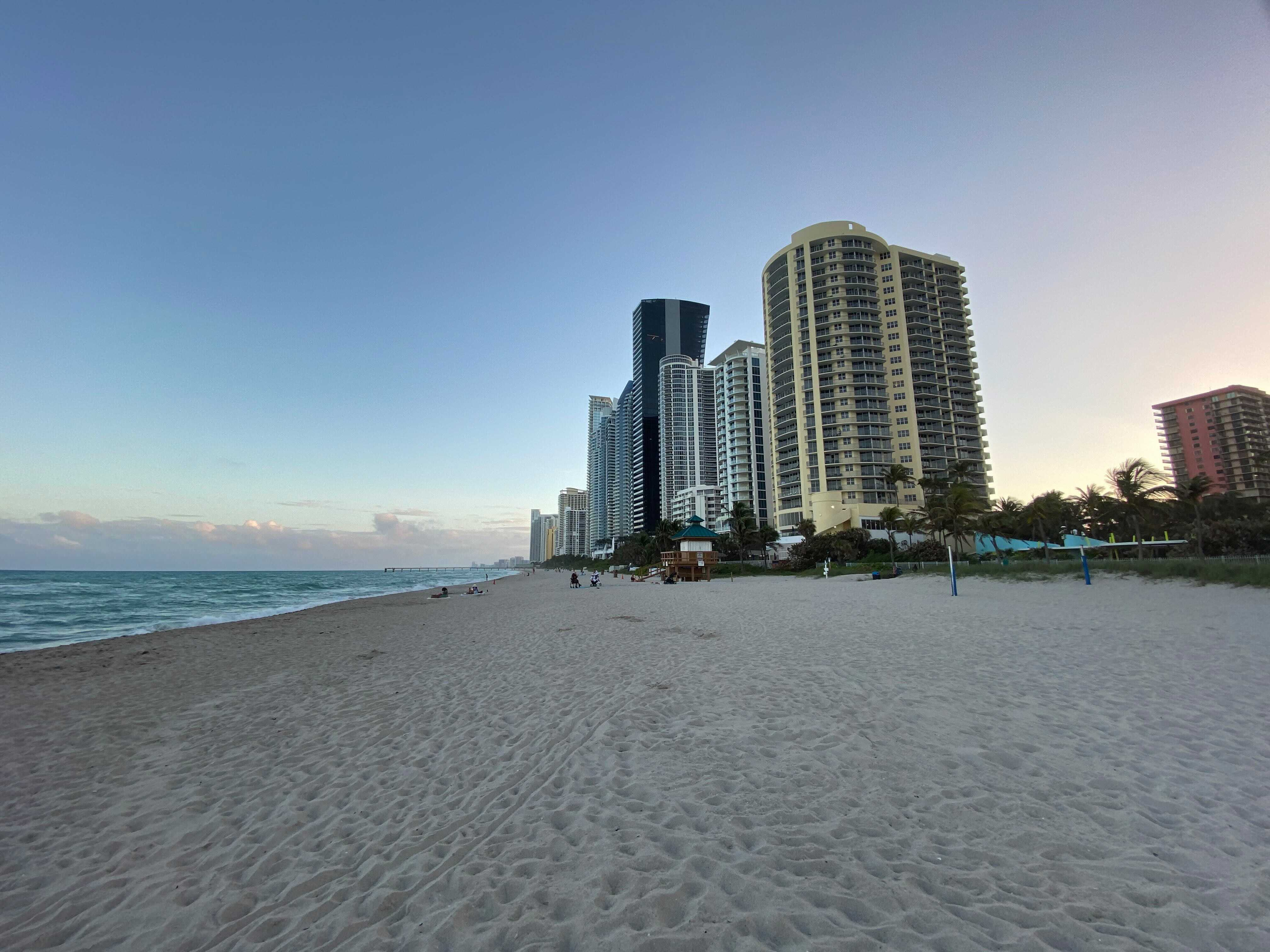
View of Sunny Isles Beach from the coast in 2021.

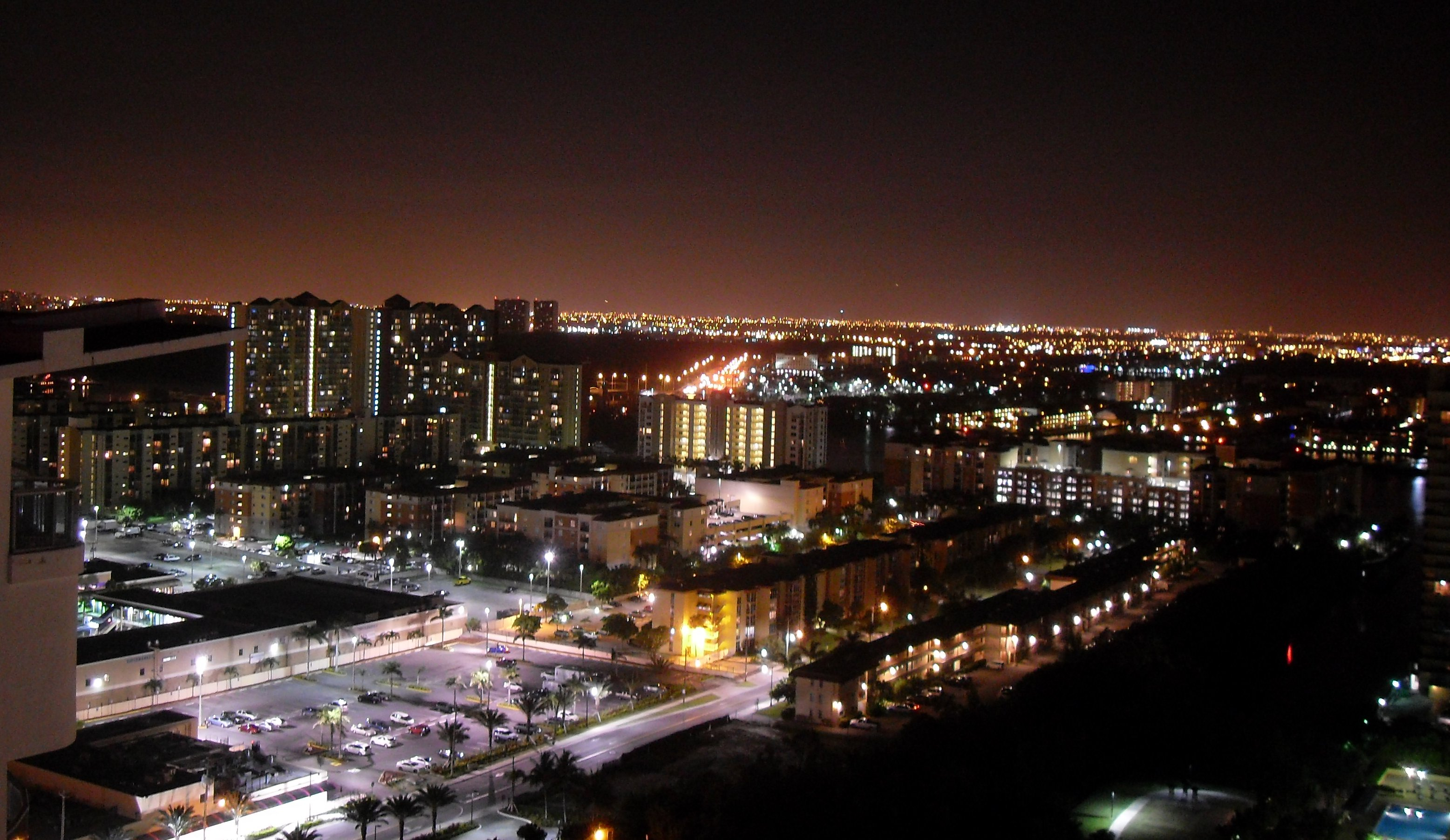
City of Sunny Isles Beach by night in 2009.

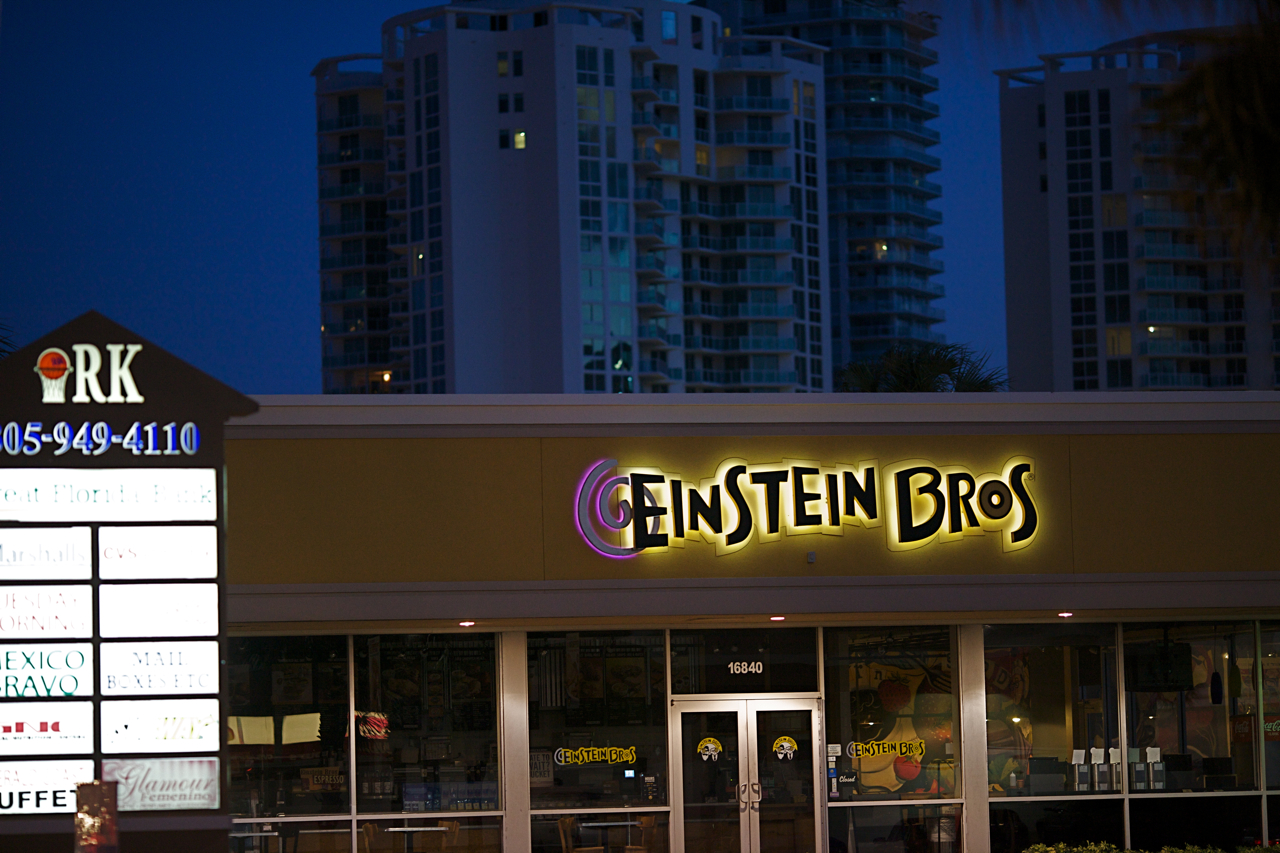
Einstein Bros in 2009.

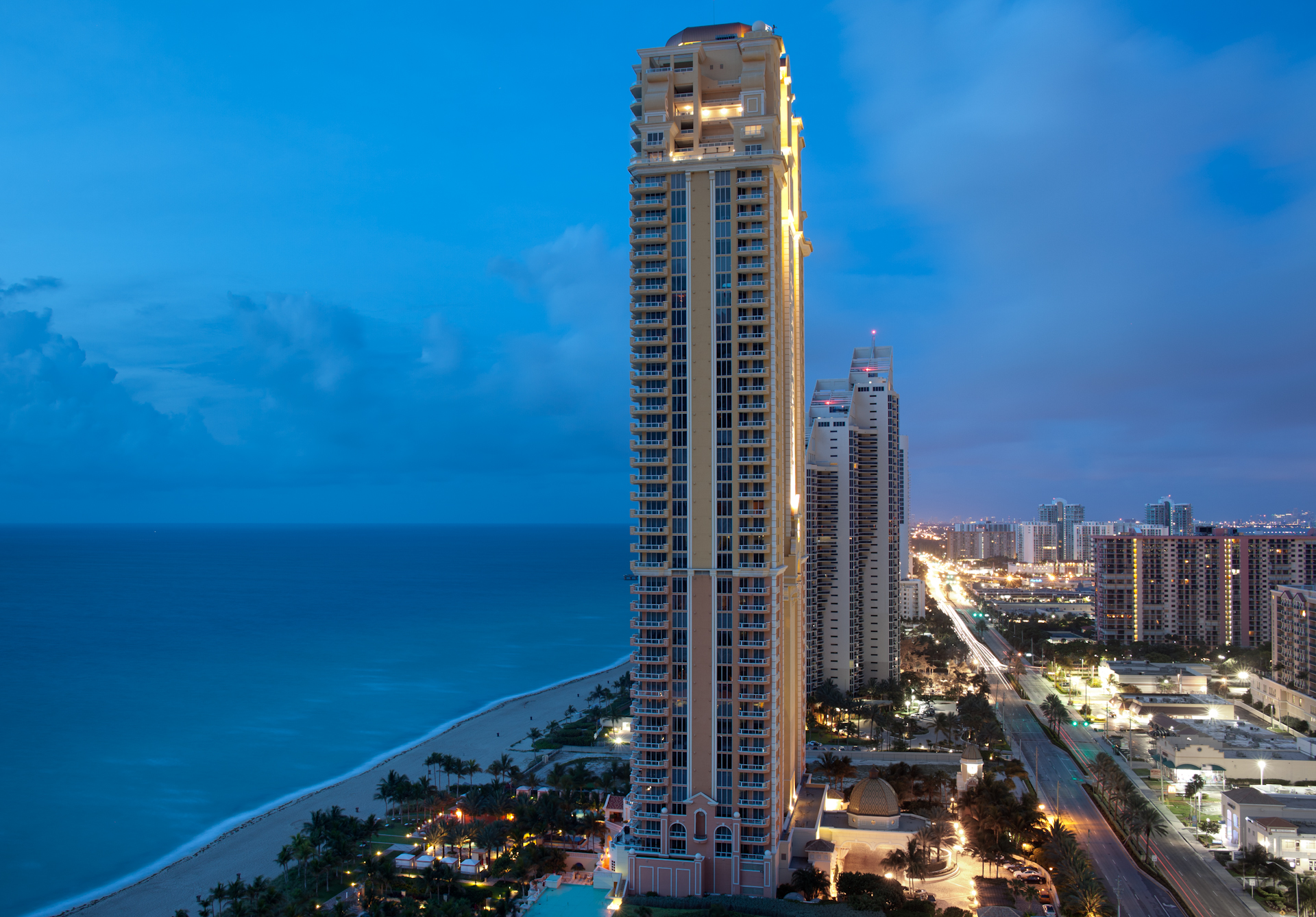
Acqualina & Spa back in 2011.

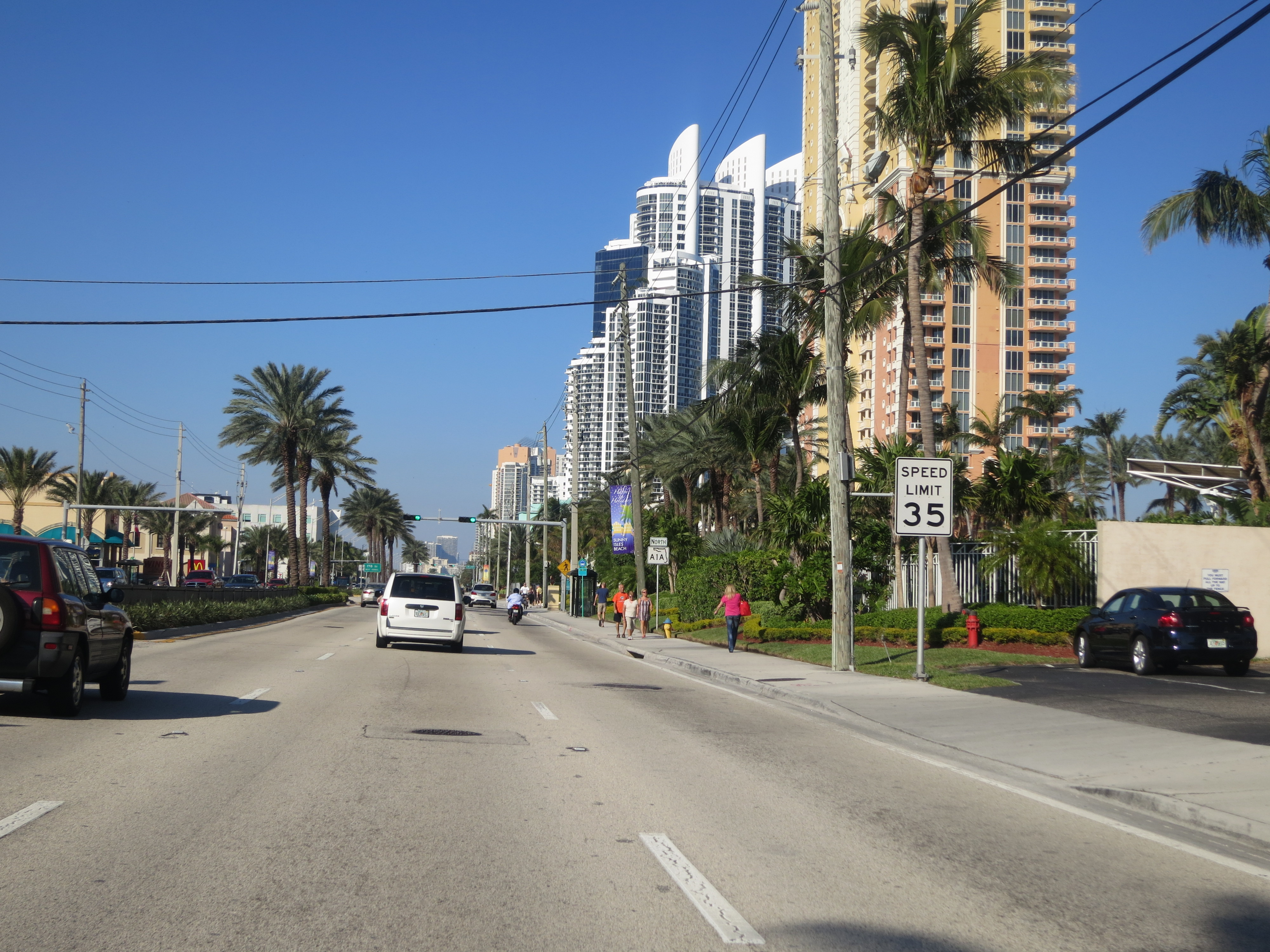
Collins Ave in 2012.

== See also ==
- List of tallest buildings in Miami
- List of tallest buildings in Miami Beach
- List of tallest buildings in Fort Lauderdale
- List of tallest buildings in Jacksonville
- List of tallest buildings in Orlando
- List of tallest buildings in Tampa
- List of tallest buildings in St. Petersburg
- List of tallest buildings in Tallahassee
- List of tallest buildings in Florida
