= Trump Towers (Sunny Isles Beach) =

Condominium development in Florida

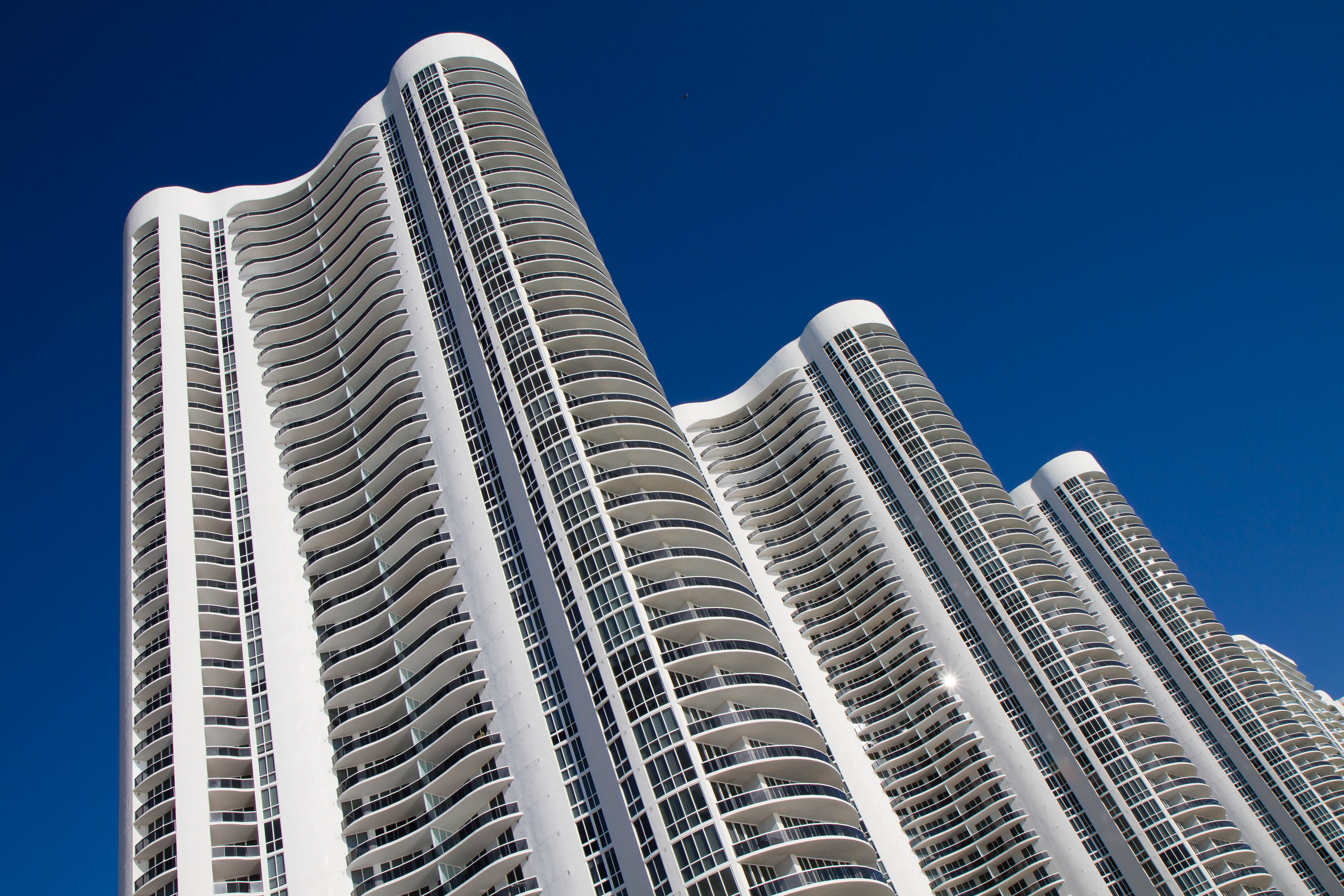
- Trump Towers in Sunny Isles Beach, Florida
- Interactive map of the Trump Towers area

General information
- Status: Completed
- Type: Residential
- Location: 16001 (Tower I), 15911 (Tower II), 15811 (Tower III) Collins Avenue, Sunny Isles Beach, Florida
- Coordinates: 25°55′26″N 80°07′18″W
- Construction started: 2005
- Completed: 2008 (Tower I and II), 2009 (Tower III)

Height
- Height: 160.32 m

Technical details
- Floor count: 45

Design and construction
- Architecture firm: Sieger Suarez Architects

Trump Towers is an oceanfront condominium development in Sunny Isles Beach, Florida consisting of three 271-unit towers with developer Gil Dezer of Dezer Properties. The three identical towers are designed by the Miami based company Sieger Suarez Architects. The luxurious indoor design is by Hirsch Bedner Associates with a three-story atrium, restaurant, fitness center, spa, and pool deck in each tower.

== See also ==
- List of tallest buildings in Sunny Isles Beach
