= The St. Regis Bal Harbour =

Hotel in Bal Harbor, Florida

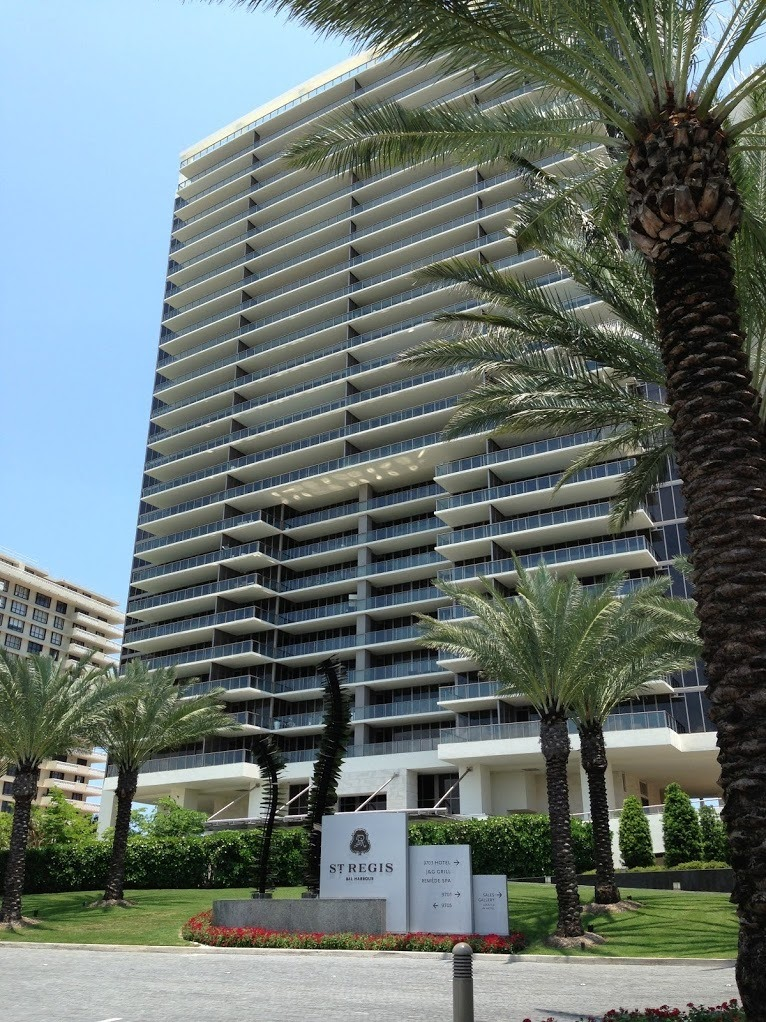
- The St. Regis Bal Harbour in 2017
- Interactive map of the The St. Regis Bal Harbour area
- Hotel chain: St. Regis Hotels & Resorts

General information
- Type: Resort, hotel
- Location: 9703 Collins Avenue Bal Harbour, Miami Beach, Florida
- Coordinates: 25°53′19.9″N 80°07′23.6″W
- Construction started: 2007
- Completed: 2012
- Management: Marriott International

Technical details
- Floor count: 27
- Floor area: 1,639 m^{2} (17,640 sq ft)

Design and construction
- Architect: Sieger Suárez Architectural Partnership

Website
- www.marriott.com/en-us/hotels/miaxr-the-st-regis-bal-harbour-resort/overview/

The St. Regis Bal Harbour Resort is a luxury resort in Bal Harbour, Florida. The resort is located across from the Bal Harbour Shops and near Miami's South Beach. In January 2014, the Qatar-based Al Faisal Holding Company LLC acquired the St. Regis Bal Harbour Resort from Starwood Hotels & Resorts Worldwide, Inc.

== Property details ==
Located in the Miami-Dade County village of Bal Harbour, the St. Regis Bal Harbour Resort is a 27-story oceanfront property. The property, which opened in 2012, is located on a 9.5-acre plot which includes 600 feet of oceanfront access. In addition to the 207 hotel rooms, the St. Regis Bal Harbour Resort also includes private residences and condominium-hotel suites.

The St. Regis Bal Harbour Resort has amenities and services including three dining areas, a fitness suite, spa, business center, kids' club and two ocean-view pools.

The St. Regis Bal Harbour Resort's restaurants include Atlantikos, The Grill at St. Regis, La Gourmandise and The St. Regis Bar & Wine Vault.

== ARTIC acquisition ==
In January 2014, Starwood Hotels & Resorts Worldwide sold the St. Regis Bal Harbour Resort to the Al Faisal Holding Company's real estate and hospitality focused subsidiary, Al Rayyan Tourism Investment Company (ARTIC), for $213 million. [i] The previous owner Starwood would continue to serve as the property managers and the resort would continue to operate as a St. Regis resort. According to a 2014 report, the deal is among the largest property sales in South Florida.

In 2016, ARTIC allocated $35 million in order to add a restaurant, three, four-bedroom suites, and a renovated lobby to the St. Regis Bal Harbour resort.

== Partnership with Qatar Airways ==
On June 17, 2014, ARTIC announced that it had signed a partnership agreement with Qatar Airways which allowed for the St. Regis Bal Harbour Resort to become the preferred hotel for the airline. Qatar Airways also announced four new weekly direct flights to Miami during a press conference at the St. Regis Bal Harbour Resort.
