= Jade Beach and Jade Ocean =

Residential condominiums in Sunny Isles Beach, Florida, U.S.

Coordinates: 25.933998°N 80.12107°W

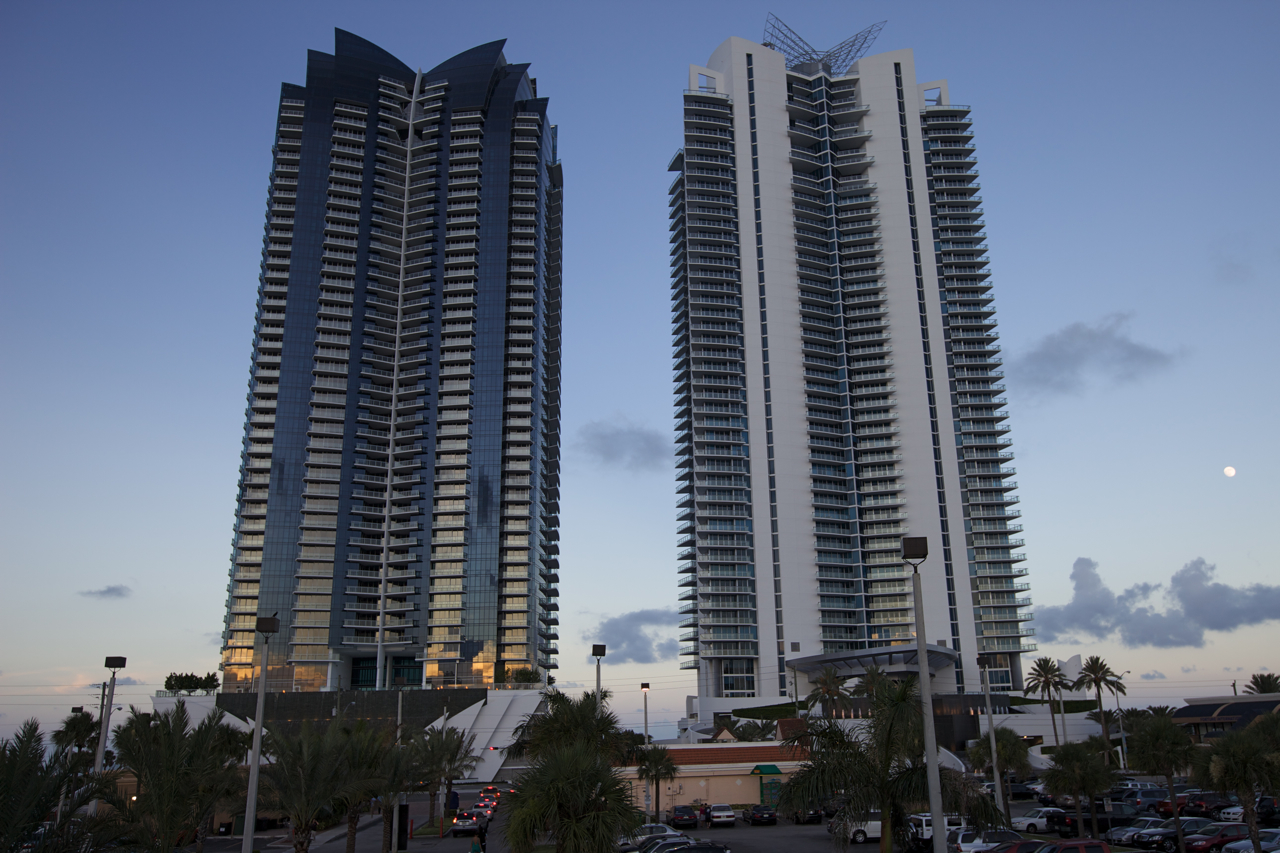
Jade Ocean and Jade Beach from the west

Jade Beach and Jade Ocean are two high-rise residential condominiums located in Sunny Isles Beach, Florida. Finished in 2009, Jade Beach has 52 floors and rises 574.01 feet (175 m), making it the second-tallest building in Sunny Isles Beach and the 18th tallest building in Florida as of early 2015. Jade Ocean has a darker colored, glass facaded, 544.62-foot (166 m), 51-story twin tower named Jade Ocean that was completed in 2008. Both buildings were designed by architect Carlos Ott.

== See also ==
- List of tallest buildings in Sunny Isles Beach
