= Brickell House =

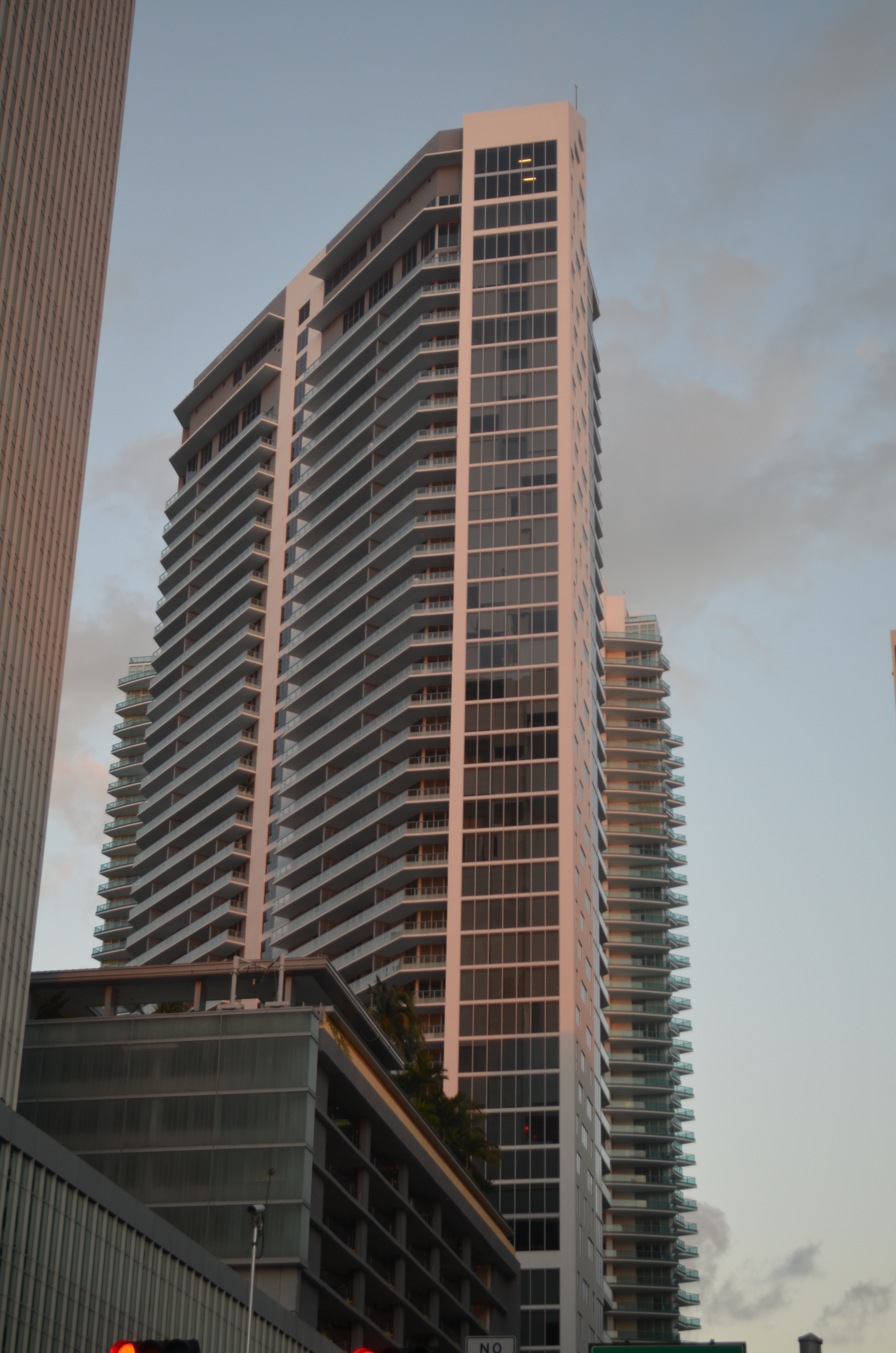
- Brickell House topped out in 2014
- Interactive map of the Brickell House area

General information
- Status: Completed
- Type: Residential
- Location: 1300 Brickell Bay Drive, Miami, Florida, United States
- Coordinates: 25.76037235°N 80.190197235°W
- Construction started: July 2012
- Completed: 2014
- Opening: 2014

Height
- Roof: 500 ft (150 m)

Technical details
- Floor count: 46

Design and construction
- Architects: Sieger Suárez Architectural Partnership, Inc.
- Developer: Newgard Development Group

Brickell House is a condominium tower in the Brickell neighborhood of Miami, Florida. It was built by Newgard Development Group. Proposed in 2011, the tower stands at roughly 500 feet (152 m) with 46 floors and is opened in 2014. Construction began in spring of 2012, making it one of the first condominium projects to go ahead in Miami since the 2007 housing bust and late 2000s recession. Construction of the tower was estimated to create 300 to 400 jobs.

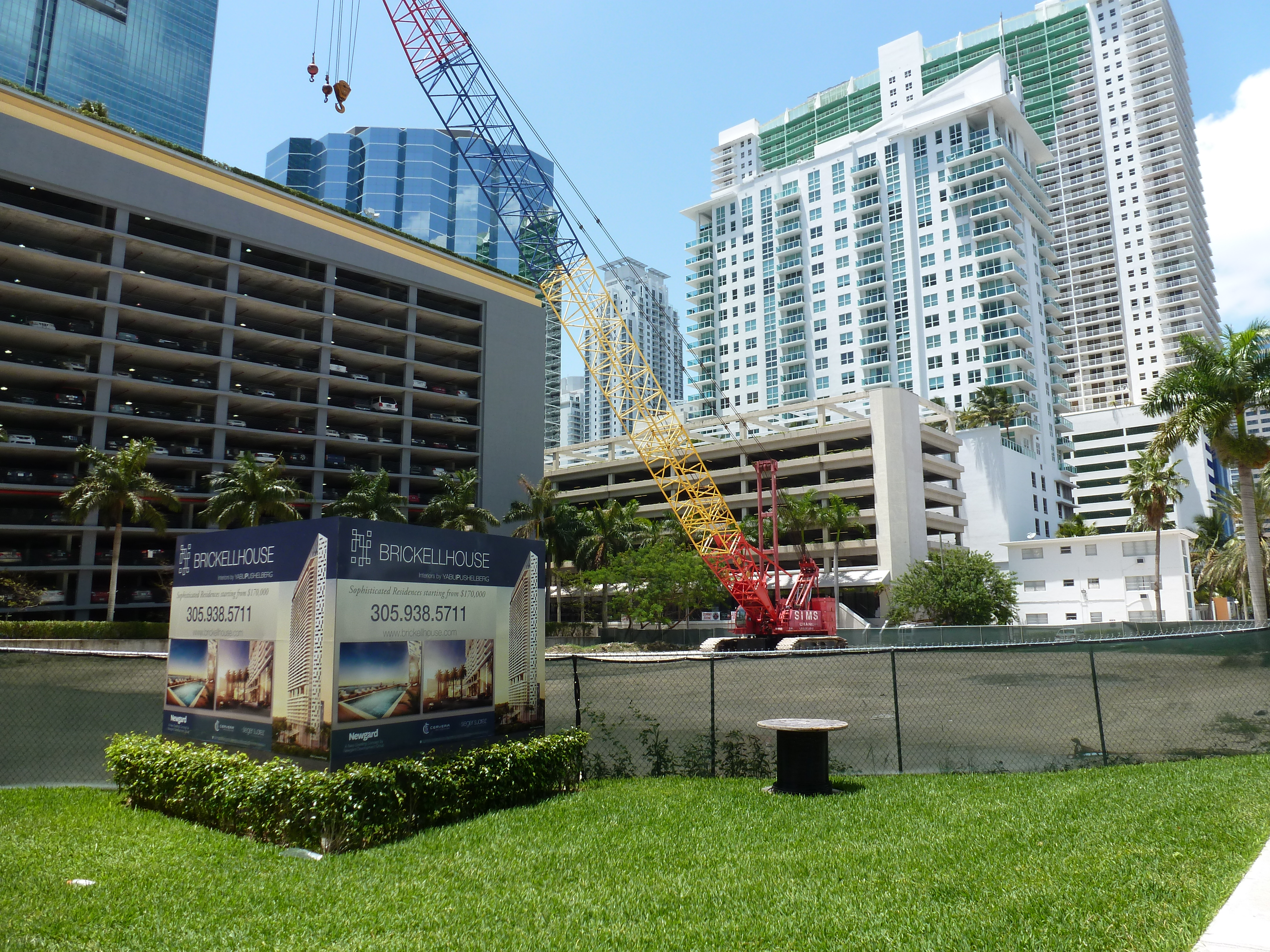
Construction site in 2011

The financing model, popular in Latin America, is for the $170 million project is for at least 70% of the units are presold before construction begins, which ensures financing and reduces the likelihood of foreclosure. The tower is located in Miami's Brickell Financial District at 1330 Brickell Bay Drive. It features 374 units and a robotic parking garage. Units ranged from 400 sq ft (37 m^{2}) studios to 1,438 sq ft (134 m^{2}) 3-bedroom units, as well as 1,775 sq ft (165 m^{2}) penthouses. The ground level features retail and restaurant space. The architect is Sieger Suarez and the interior designer is Yabu Pushelberg. Brickell House is located one block east of the Financial District Metromover station and three blocks southeast of the Brickell Metrorail and Metromover transfer station.

In 2015, management and design issues led to a closure of the robotic parking garage, which had already been operating slower than expected

== See also ==
- List of tallest buildings in Miami
