= Porsche Design Tower (Sunny Isles Beach) =

Residential Condo in Sunny Isles Beach, Florida

Coordinates: 25.948228°N 80.120512°W

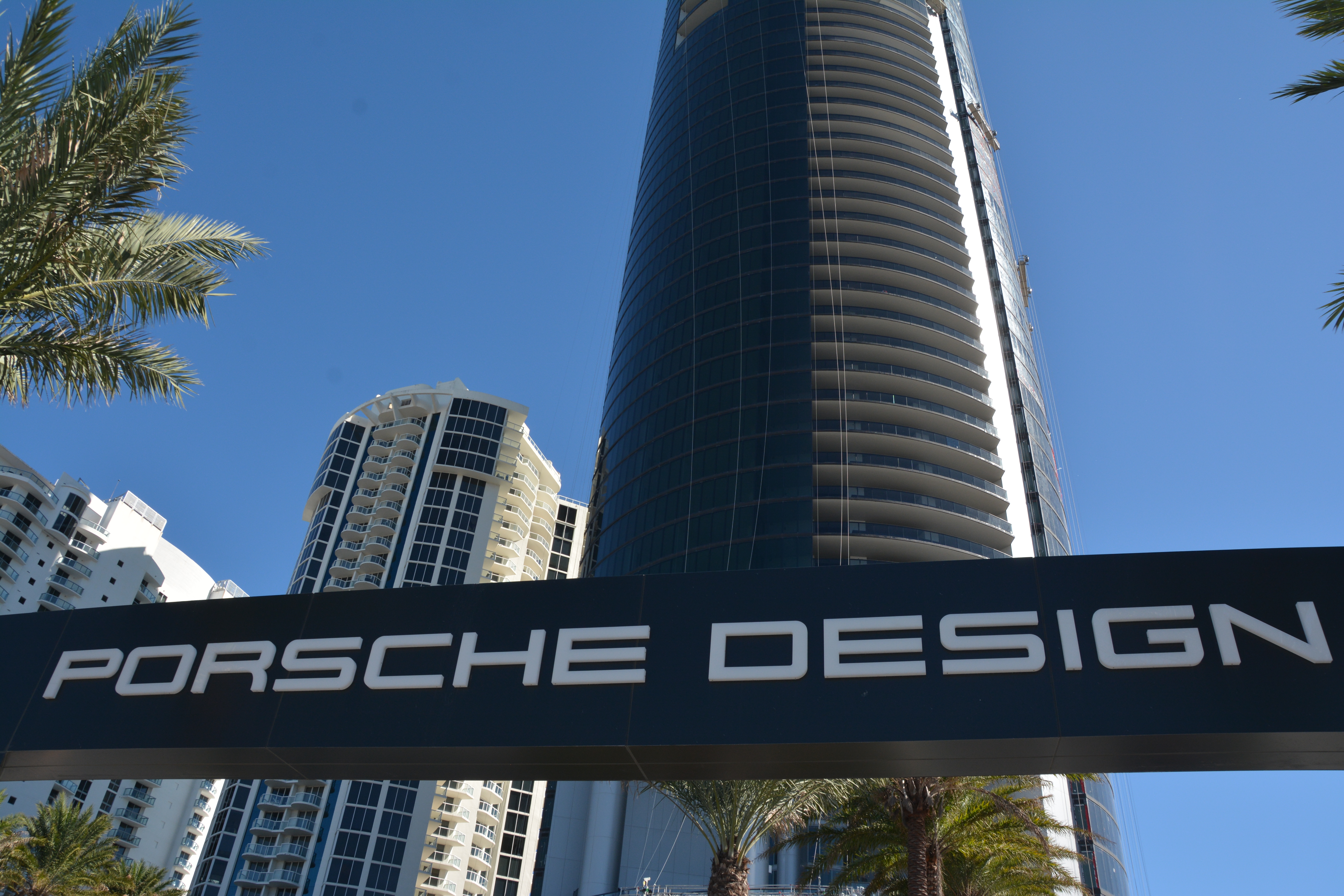
- Porsche Design Tower near completion in early 2017

General information
- Status: Completed
- Type: Residential
- Location: 18555 Collins Avenue, Sunny Isles Beach, Florida
- Construction started: April 19, 2014
- Completed: January 2017

Height
- Roof: 641 ft (195 m)

Technical details
- Floor count: 60
- Lifts/elevators: 3

Design and construction
- Architect: Sieger Suarez Architects
- Developer: Dezer Properties

The Porsche Design Tower is a luxury residential skyscraper in Sunny Isles Beach, Florida, designed by Sieger Suarez Architects and branded by Porsche Design. At 641 feet (195 m) with 60 stories, it is one of the tallest buildings in Sunny Isles Beach. It is unique for its inclusion of a robotic parking garage, having 284 parking spaces for 132 units allowing unit owners to park two or four cars right outside their unit. The tower also extensively features premium glasswork by prominent international glass firm Continental Glass Systems.

Each unit ranges in cost from $4 million to $32.5 million. Drivers ride up the elevator in their cars and are placed into their own "garage" adjacent to their unit. The tower has three elevators to take cars to their units and estimated to cost about $560 million to build.

The groundbreaking commenced on April 19, 2014, at the Sales Center of the Porsche Design Tower in Sunny Isles Beach, Florida. The building was completed in January 2017.

In 2024 a study conducted by researchers at the University of Miami found out that the Porsche Tower have sunk as much as eight centimetres in to the ground since 2016. The reasons given for the sinking were the inconsistent layers of limestone and natural groundwater movements. The research was conducted over a period of seven years using a monitoring device called Interferometric Synthetic Aperture Radar (InSAR).

== See also ==
- List of tallest buildings in Sunny Isles Beach
- Porsche Design
- Dezer Properties
- Porsche Design Tower Stuttgart
