= CMC Group =

Real estate developer

CMG Group, Inc.
- Industry: real estate
- Founded: 1987
- Headquarters: Miami, Florida
- Services: real estate development construction investment

CMC Group Inc. was founded in 1987 by real estate developer Ugo Colombo. CMC Group Inc. is a residential and commercial real estate development, construction, and investment company headquartered in Miami, Florida.

CMC Group's developments include Epic Residences and Hotel, a 55-story luxury condominium and hotel on the Miami River in downtown Miami, Grovenor House, a 166-unit luxury condominium project completed in 2006 in the heart of Miami's Coconut Grove community, and Bristol Tower and Santa Maria on Brickell Avenue. Colombo participated in a joint venture to create the ultimate in country club living, Porto Vita, a Mediterranean-style village located in Aventura, North Miami-Dade County, along the Intracoastal Waterway.

CMC Group is currently a joint venture partner with Valerio Morabito in the development of boutique condominium Beach House 8 on Miami Beach. And in 2013, Ugo Colombo and CMC Group purchased the Brickell Flatiron site in downtown Miami with businessman Vladislav Doronin for $23 million to develop a luxury residential tower with interior design by American artist and filmmaker Julian Schnabel.
