= Ugo Colombo (real estate developer) =

Italian-American real estate developer

- Born: 2 March 1961 (age 65); Milan, Italy
- Education: University of Miami
- Occupations: Real Estate Developer, Entrepreneur, Philanthropist

Ugo Colombo (Milan, 2 March 1961) is an Italian-born residential and commercial real estate developer in Miami, Florida.

== Early life ==
Colombo was born in Milan, Italy on 2 March 1961. He was schooled in a Lausanne, Switzerland boarding school and spent two years working for his father's industrial empire. He came to the US in 1983 and attended the University of Miami.

== Real estate ==
Ugo Colombo's real estate career began when he acquired and resold a group of foreclosed units from the Federal Deposit Insurance Corporation. He then formed his company CMC Group, which focused on the management of distressed real estate in Miami. His company then entered the design and construction industry with a focus on high-rise luxury condominium buildings on Brickell Avenue in Miami, as well as in Aventura and Miami Beach. The first building venture he was a part of was the Villa Regina in Brickell, Miami. One of the next buildings he built was the 1992 Bristol Tower on the same avenue, which cost $80 million. He is also the founder of Glasswall, which creates impact-resistant glass for use in high-rise buildings, including hurricane-proof glass.

In partnership with Portman Holdings, Colombo's CMC Group was one of two groups bidding to redevelop Miami Beach's ageing convention centre complex. The project was later investigated due to concerns of bid rigging, and Colombo was cleared of any wrongdoing. At the end of May, 2014 Ugo Colombo established a joint venture with real estate magnate Vladislav Doronin to develop a number of luxury residential real estate projects in Miami, the first of which is called Brickell Flatiron with artist Julian Schnabel. In 2014 Colombo sold an undeveloped parcel of land along the Miami River for $125 million, which he had originally purchased for $25 million in 2006.

In 1993, he and his firm, CMC Group, began building Bristol Tower on Brickell Avenue, the condo that ignited the luxury residential boom in Miami. The Bristol Tower was one of the first buildings added to the Miami skyline in fifteen years when it was developed. Colombo has stated that he uses glass and metal in his buildings as opposed to concrete for aesthetic reasons. One of his buildings, the 54-story Santa Maria condominium in Miami, was the tallest American building constructed south of New York City when it was completed in the 1990s.

In 2003, Colombo partnered with the developers of a new hotel to replace the Dupont Plaza Hotel in Miami. Colombo's developments include Epic Residences and Hotel, a 55-story luxury condominium and hotel at the mouth of the Miami River in downtown Miami, and Grovenor House, a 166-unit luxury condominium project completed in 2006 of Miami's Coconut Grove community.

In 2022, Colombo launched sales of Vita at Grove Isle, a 65-unit ultra luxury residential development on the 20-acre private island of Grove Isle, located in Miami's Coconut Grove neighborhood.

== The Collection ==
In 1994, Colombo acquired The Collection, a seven-franchise luxury automotive dealership. Colombo bought The Collection after it had been seized by the U.S. government during a drug prosecution case against his ex-racing partner, Armando "Mandy" Fernandez.

== Personal life ==
Ugo Colombo is married to Sara Colombo, who owns the interior design shop NEST in Miami, which specializes in luxury interiors. They have three children together. The two have also held charitable events in their home, including art auctions in support of Best Buddies International and the Brandt Foundation.
