= Ugo Colombo =

Ugo Colombo may refer to:

- Ugo Colombo (cyclist) (1940–2019), Italian racing cyclist
- Ugo Colombo (real estate) (born 1961), Italian-born American residential and commercial real estate developer
