= The Bond on Brickell =

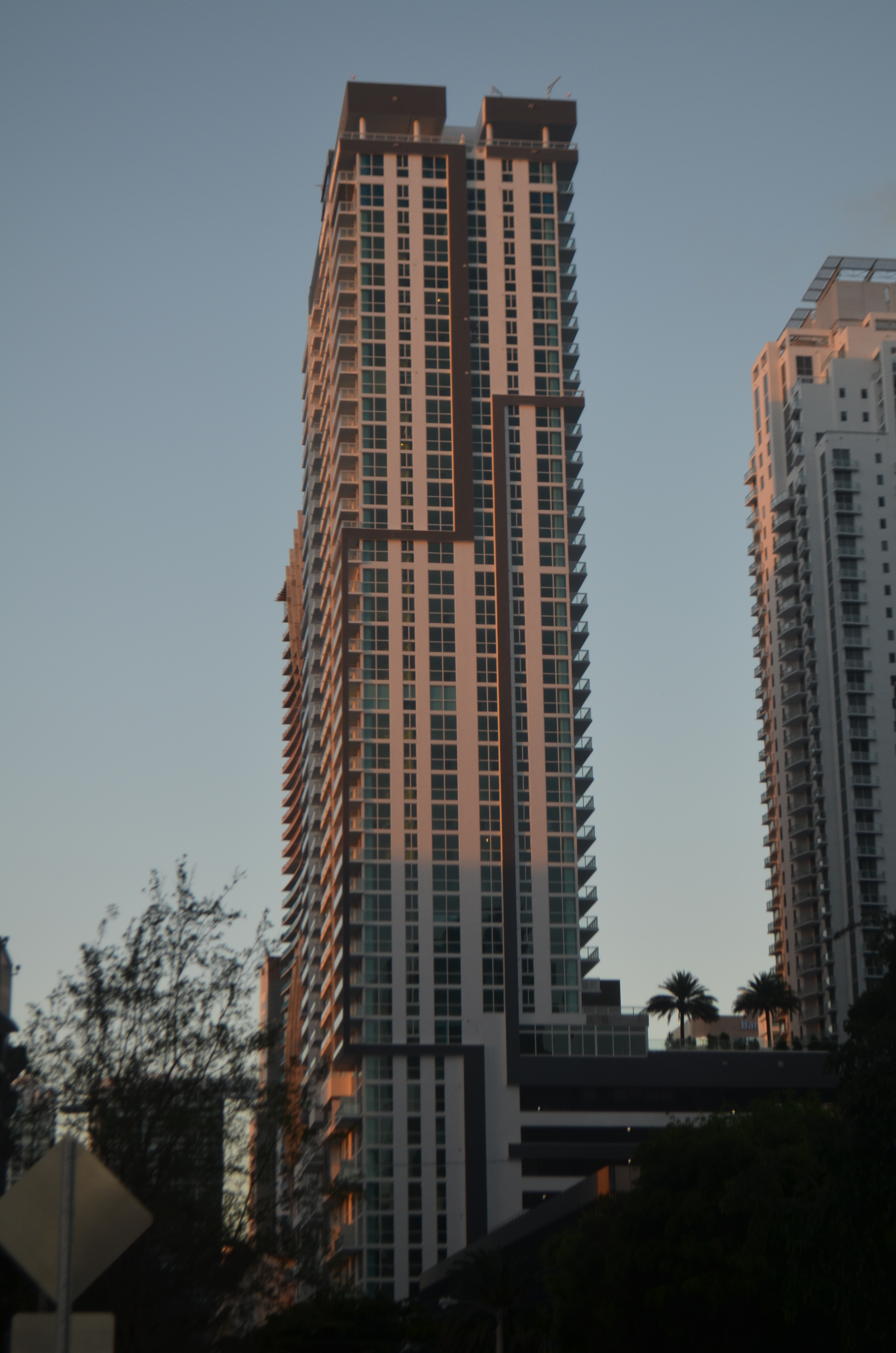
- Interactive map of the The Bond on Brickell area

General information
- Status: Completed
- Type: Residential
- Location: 1080 Brickell Avenue, Miami, Florida, United States
- Coordinates: 25.7629°N 80.1923°W
- Construction started: January 28, 2014
- Completed: 2017

Height
- Roof: 151 metres (495 ft)

Technical details
- Floor count: 44
- Floor area: 300,000 sq ft (27,871 m^{2})

Design and construction
- Architect: Nichols Architects
- Main contractor: Coastal Construction

Other information
- Number of units: 328

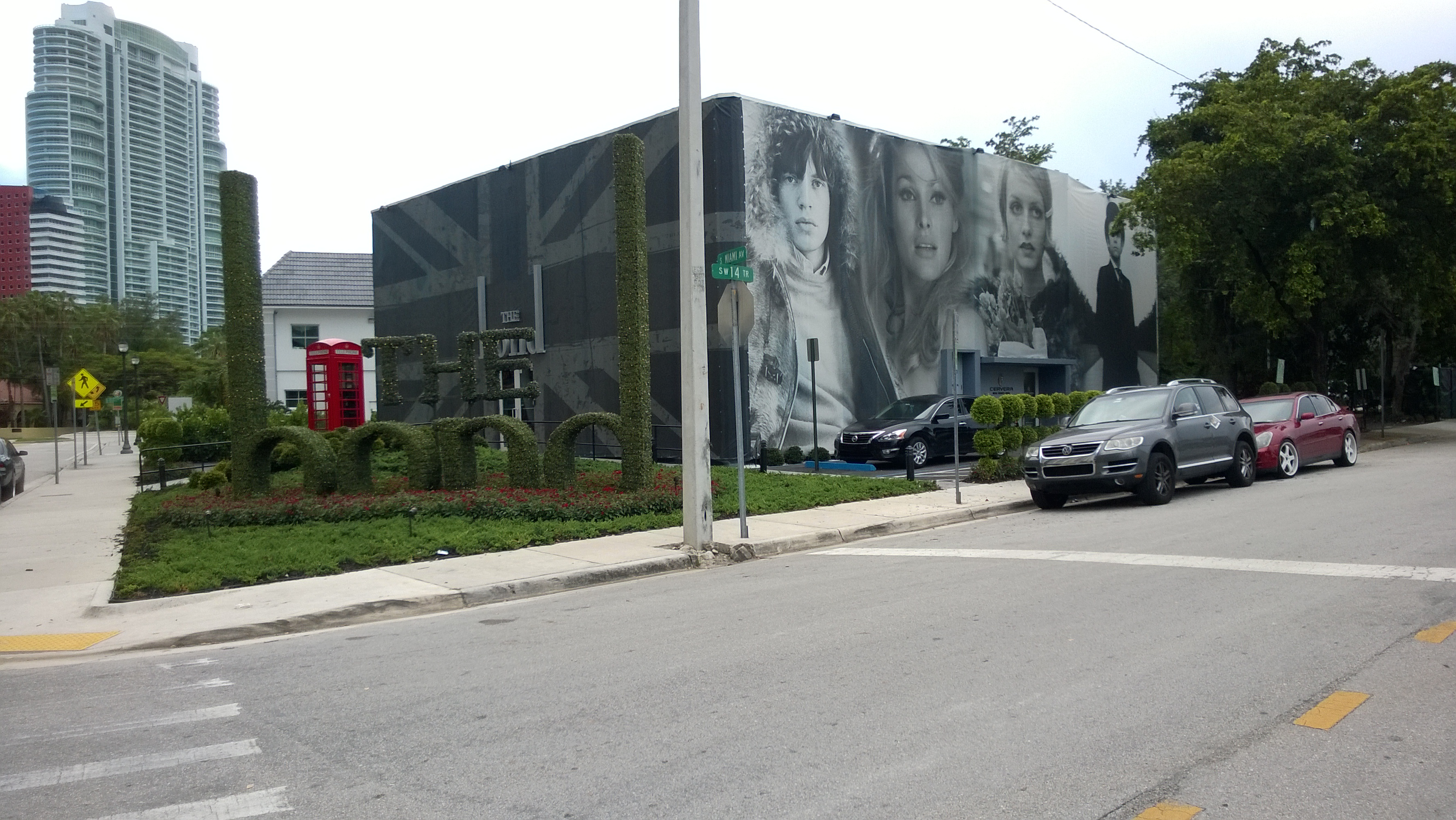
Bond on Brickell sales center located about three blocks south of building site

The Bond on Brickell is a 44-story, 328-unit residential skyscraper at 1080 Brickell Avenue. The building is located near the Tenth Street Metromover station and the Brickell Metrorail station.

The development was a collaboration between Rilea Group and MDR Toledo. The first condominium project planned for Brickell Avenue after the Great Recession, the project broke ground on January 28, 2014, and was completed in September 2016. By April 2017, the property was completely sold out.

Nichols Architects (NBWW at the time) designed The Bond to align with the mid-block characteristics of its site. This involved filling the sky void and establishing "living blocks" within the overall mass of the building. Loguer Design, a Mexican-based firm, joined the team to insert James Bond and other British themes on the interior spaces. The building features a Terry O’Neill Photo Collection, a lobby with an Abbey Road entrance and 20’ Bond Topiary. The luxury residences range from studios, 1-, 2-, and 3-bedroom units, to exclusive lofts and penthouses. Amenities include a zero-edge lap pool, health and wellness fitness center, library, children’s learning center, wet bar and kitchen, private cabanas and Jacuzzi area.

== Early proposal ==
The original 1080 Brickell was planned to be built by 2010. It was planned to rise 491 feet (150 m) and consist of 43 floors of residential condominiums, containing 315 units, a swimming pool, jacuzzi, fitness center, and a spa. It was put on hold due to the Great Recession. In March 2011, the developer announced that with the reviving market that they were looking to start 1080 Brickell in 2011 for a 2014 completion date. However, the site was still being used as a parking lot for 1110 Brickell in early 2012 and was essentially cancelled.

== See also ==
- Brickell Avenue
- List of tallest buildings in Miami
