= Brickell Avenue Bridge =

Bridge in Florida, United States

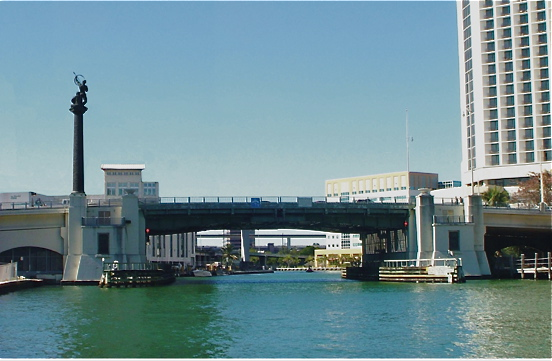
- Brickell Avenue Bridge in 1995
- Coordinates: 25°46′11″N 80°11′14″W
- Carries: US 1 (Brickell Avenue)
- Crosses: Miami River
- Locale: Downtown Miami
- Named for: Brickell Avenue

History
- Opened: 1929
- Rebuilt: 1995

Location
- Interactive map of Brickell Avenue Bridge

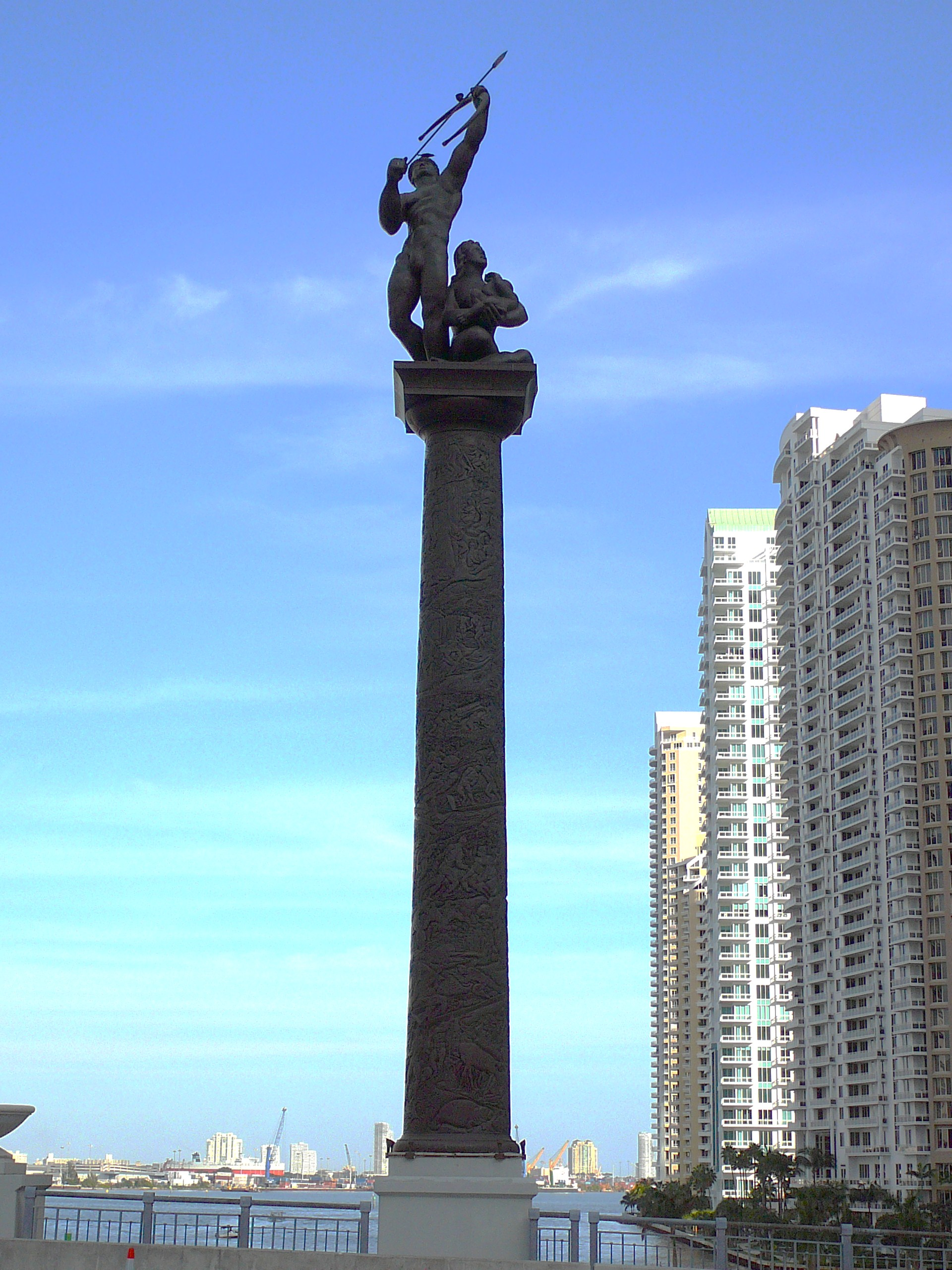
Bronze statue on the Brickell Avenue Bridge

The Brickell Avenue Bridge is a bascule bridge in Downtown Miami, Florida, that carries U.S. Route 1 (US 1; Brickell Avenue) over the Miami River. The original Brickell Avenue Bridge was built in 1929, and replaced in 1995.

Brickell Avenue Bridge was widened by one additional northbound lane in 2006 to reduce the traffic bottleneck through downtown. Before this there were three southbound but only two northbound lanes. There are three lanes in each direction as well as a pedestrian walkway on both sides. The bridge causes frequent traffic delays on the busy Brickell Avenue when it opens. According to the Florida Department of Transportation (FDOT), the bridge opened 4,990 times in 2010.

The statue is a 53-foot bronze monument commissioned by the Florida Department of Transportation and created by Cuban sculptor Manuel Carbonell in 1995. The Pillar of History is a 36-foot high carved bas-relief column that graphically narrates the lives of the Tequesta Indians, Miami's first inhabitants, and features 158 figures. At the top stands a 17-foot bronze sculpture, "Tequesta Family" portraying a Tequesta Indian warrior aiming an arrow to the sky, looking for space in eternity, with his wife and child by his side, while the son covers his face in expectation of their extinction. top.

Carbonell also created four bas reliefs, measuring 4-feet by 8-feet, which were installed in niches on the bridge's supporting piers. Each relief honors Miami's early founders and pioneers - William and Mary Brickell, Henry Flagler, Marjory Stoneman Douglas, and Julia Tuttle.
