= Icon Brickell =

Buildings in Florida, United States

Icon Brickell North Tower
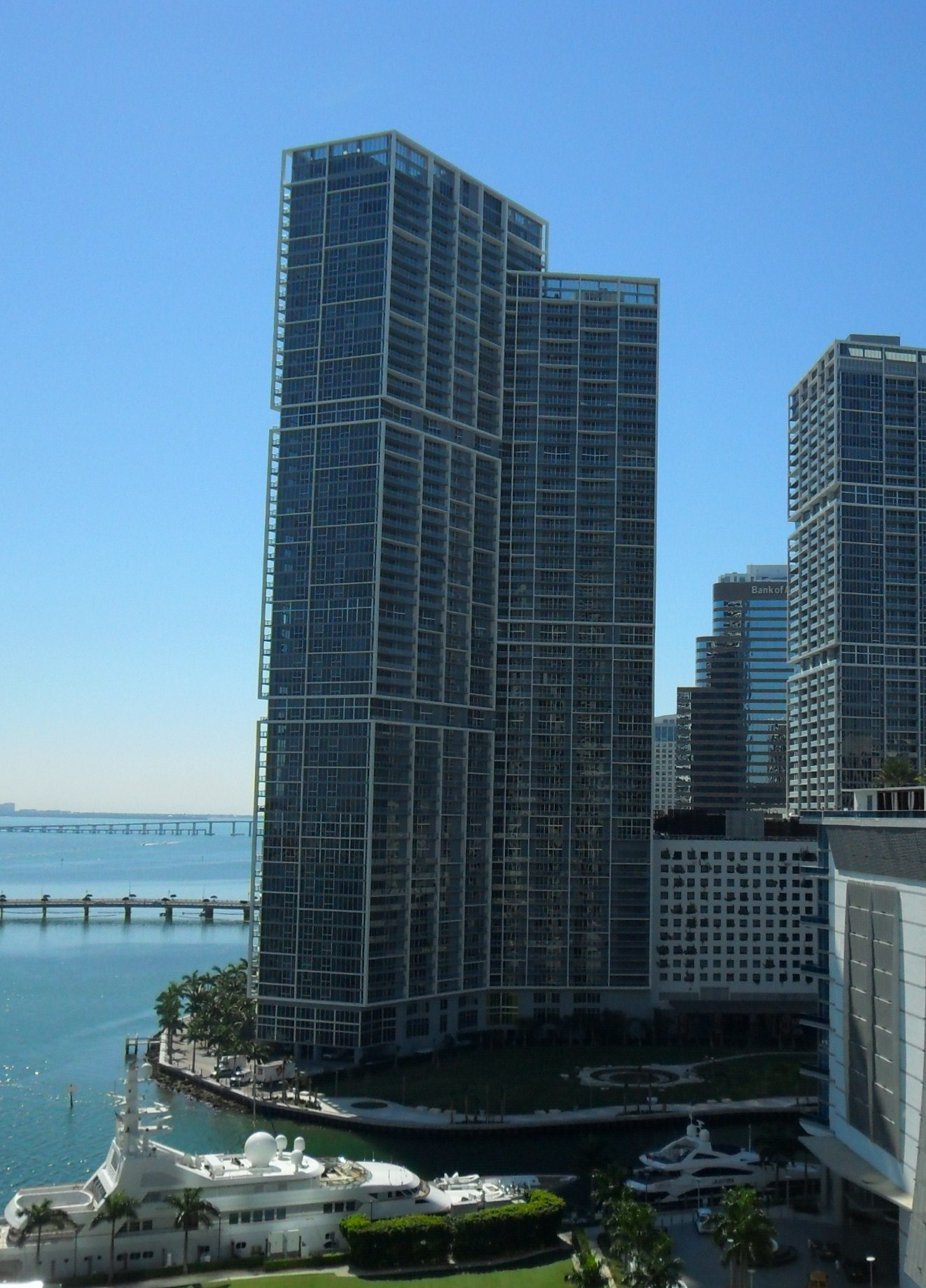
- The Icon Brickell North Tower from the north in 2011, viewed from the Southeast Financial Center parking garage

General information
- Type: Residential
- Location: 501 Brickell Avenue, Miami, Florida, United States
- Coordinates: 25.769395°N 80.189292°W
- Construction started: 2006
- Completed: 2008

Height
- Roof: 586 ft (179 m)

Technical details
- Floor count: 58

Design and construction
- Architect: Arquitectonica
- Developer: Related Group

Icon Brickell South Tower
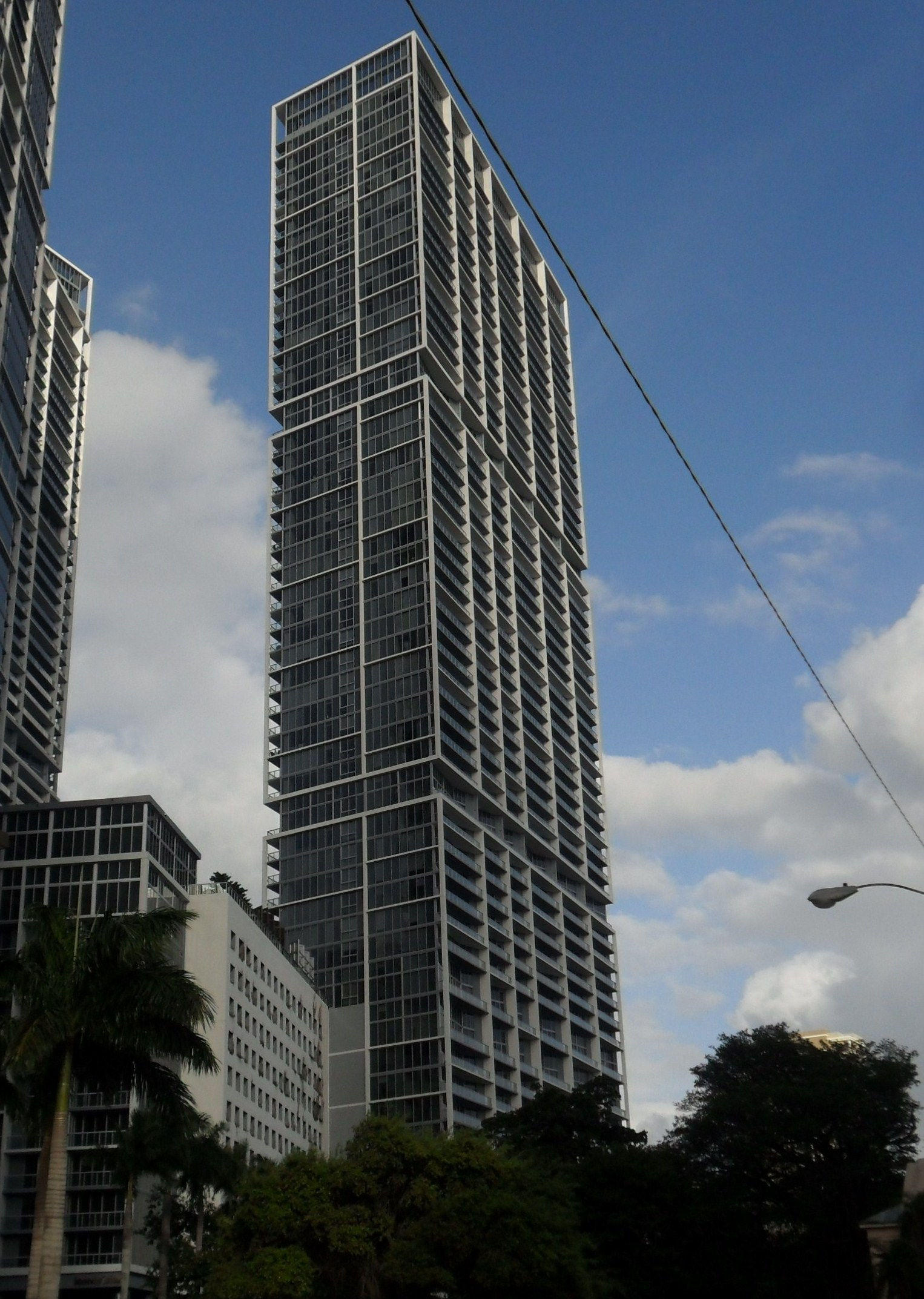
- The Icon Brickell South Tower

General information
- Type: Residential
- Location: 501 Brickell Avenue, Miami, Florida, United States
- Construction started: 2006
- Completed: 2008

Height
- Roof: 586 ft (179 m)

Technical details
- Floor count: 58

Design and construction
- Architect: Arquitectonica
- Developer: Related Group

W Miami Hotel
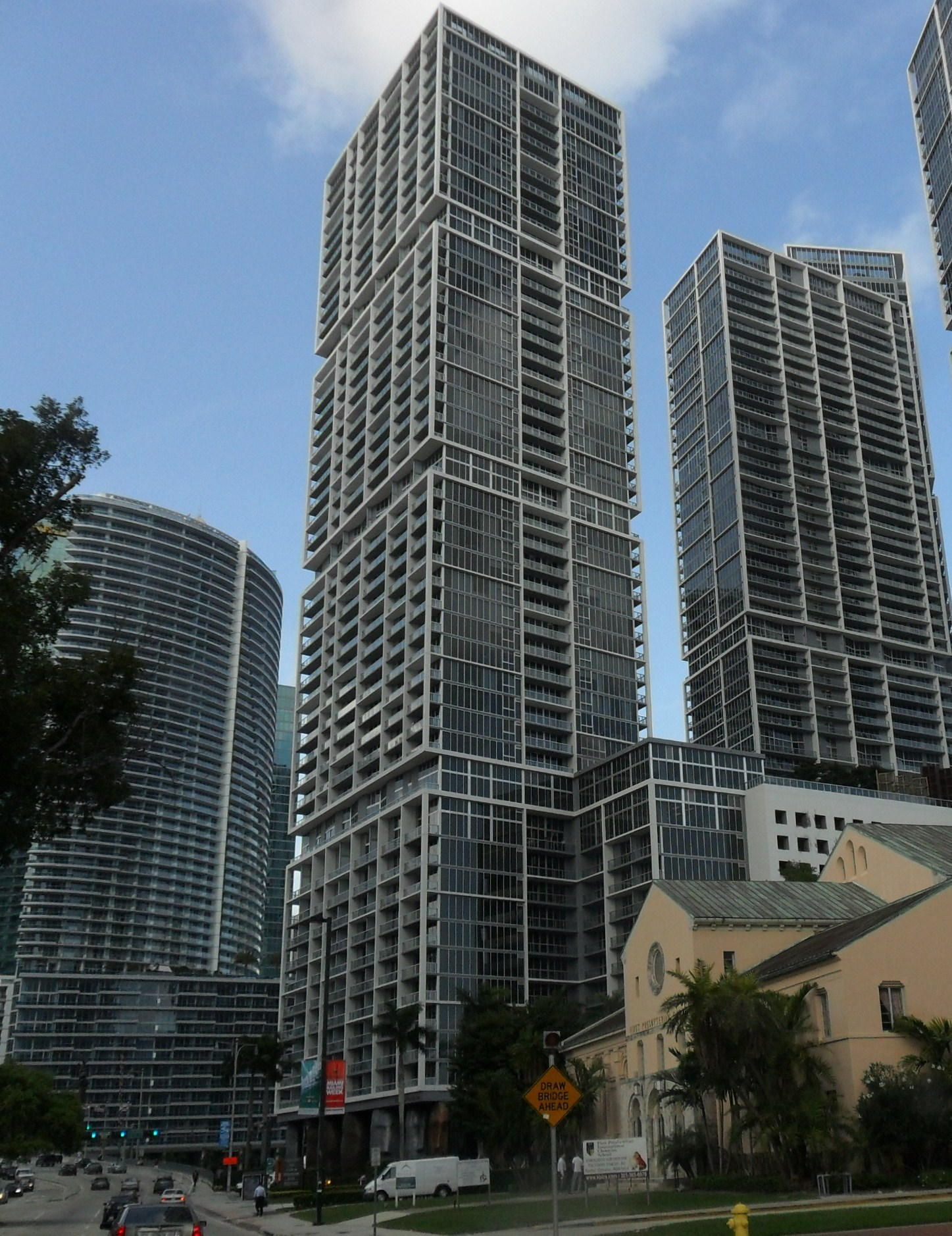
- Viceroy Tower from Brickell Avenue looking north

General information
- Type: Hotel
- Location: 501 Brickell Avenue, Miami, Florida, United States
- Construction started: 2006
- Completed: 2008

Height
- Roof: 542 ft (165 m)

Technical details
- Floor count: 50

Design and construction
- Architect: Arquitectonica
- Developer: Related Group

The Icon Brickell complex is an urban development center in Miami, Florida, United States. It is located on the south side of the Miami River in Downtown's northern Brickell Financial District. The complex consists of three skyscrapers and the Icon Brickell Plaza, connecting the towers at their base. The first two towers, the Icon Brickell North Tower and Icon Brickell South Tower, are twin buildings. Each one is 586 feet (179 m) tall with 58 floors. The third phase of the complex is the W Hotel Tower, which is 542 feet (165 m) tall with 50 floors. The complex is on the east side of Brickell Avenue between Southeast 5th and 6th Streets. The architectural firm Arquitectonica worked on the project, while the design was done by Philippe Starck and John Hitchcox's design company.

== North and south twin towers ==
The Icon Brickell South Tower is adjacent to its twin, the Icon Brickell North Tower. They are the same height and share the same amount of floors. The North Tower is the same height as the South Tower, but is shaped differently.

== W Miami ==
W Miami (formerly Viceroy Miami) is the third building in the Icon Brickell Complex. Like the North Tower and South Tower, W Miami was designed by Arquitectonica. Unlike the twin towers it shares the site with, W Miami is shorter and instead of simply condominiums, it also includes a hotel. W Miami is managed by Marriott International, Inc. The association of condominium owners is named the Icon Brickell Condo Number Three Association.

== Gallery ==
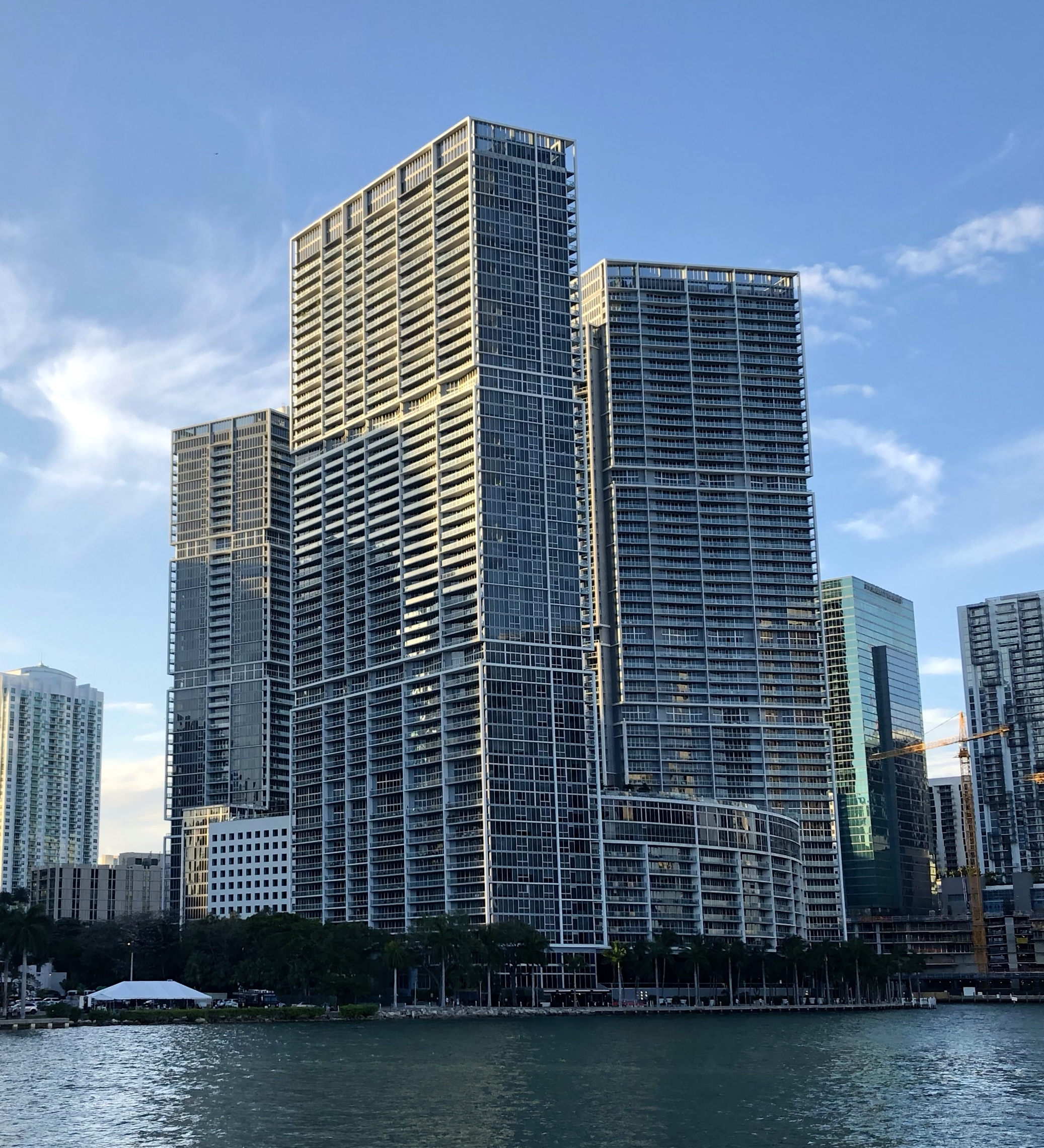
View of the complex in February 2020

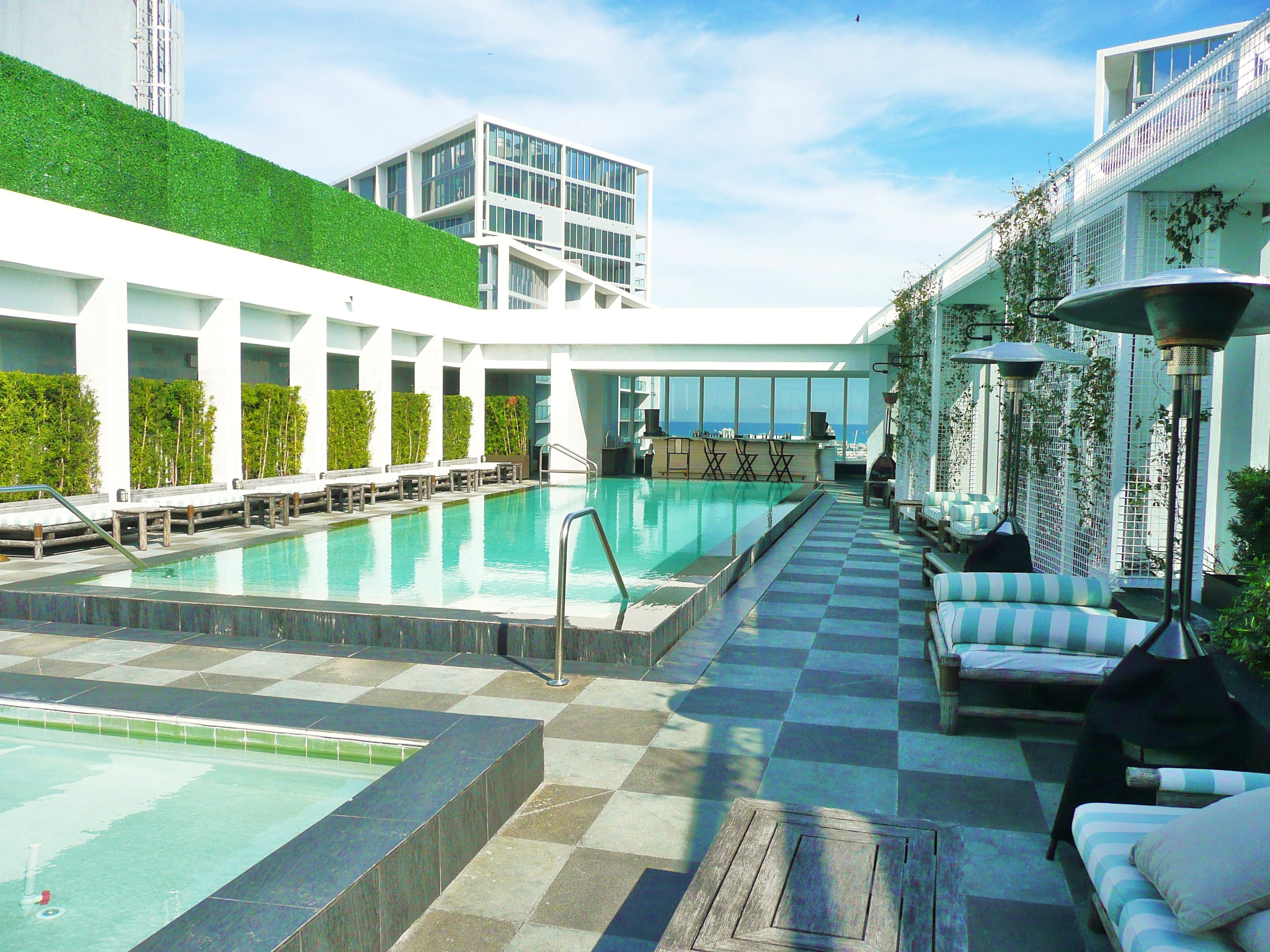
Club 50 on the 50th floor of the Viceroy

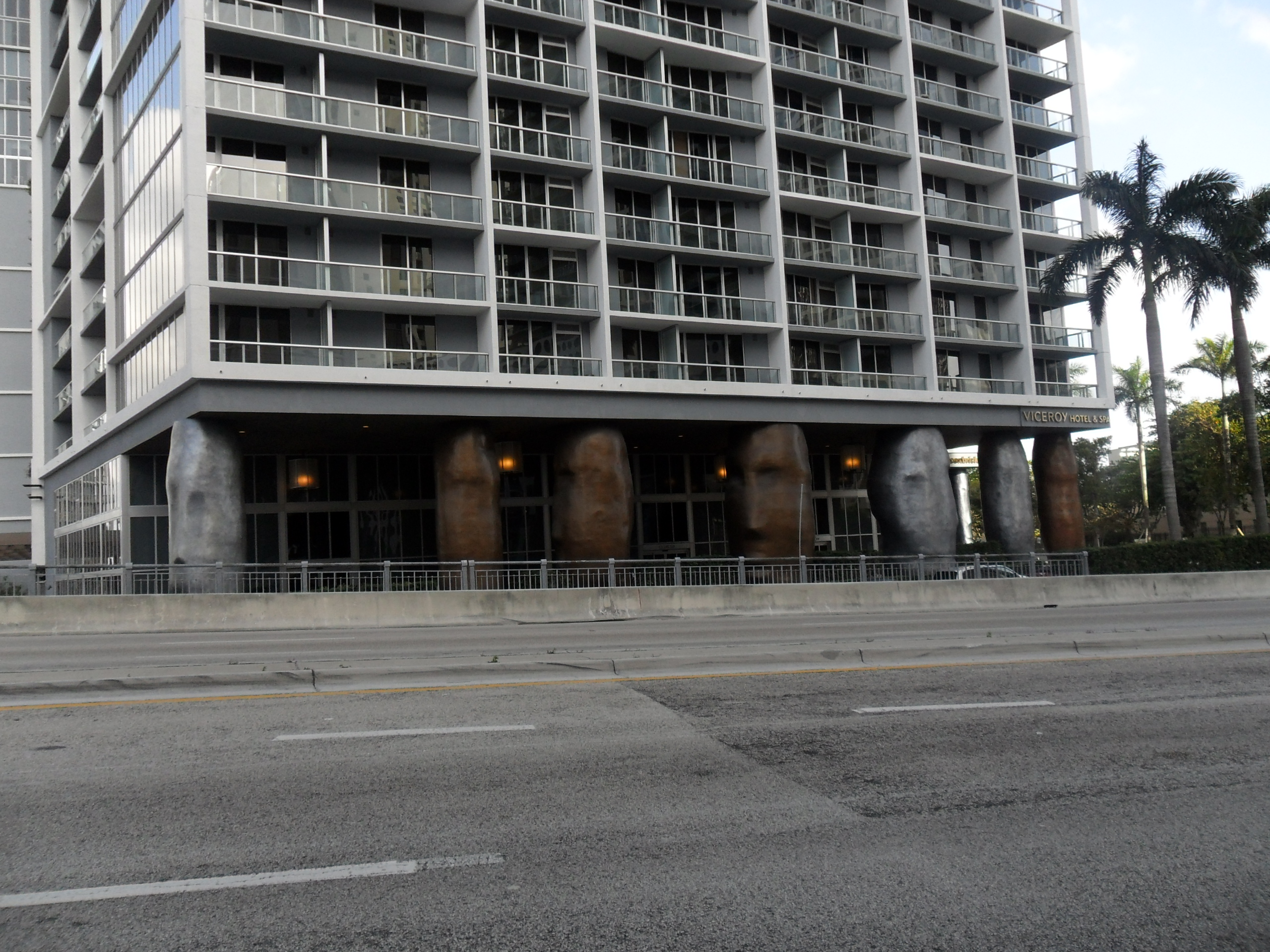
Entrance and bottom of the Viceroy Hotel & Spa

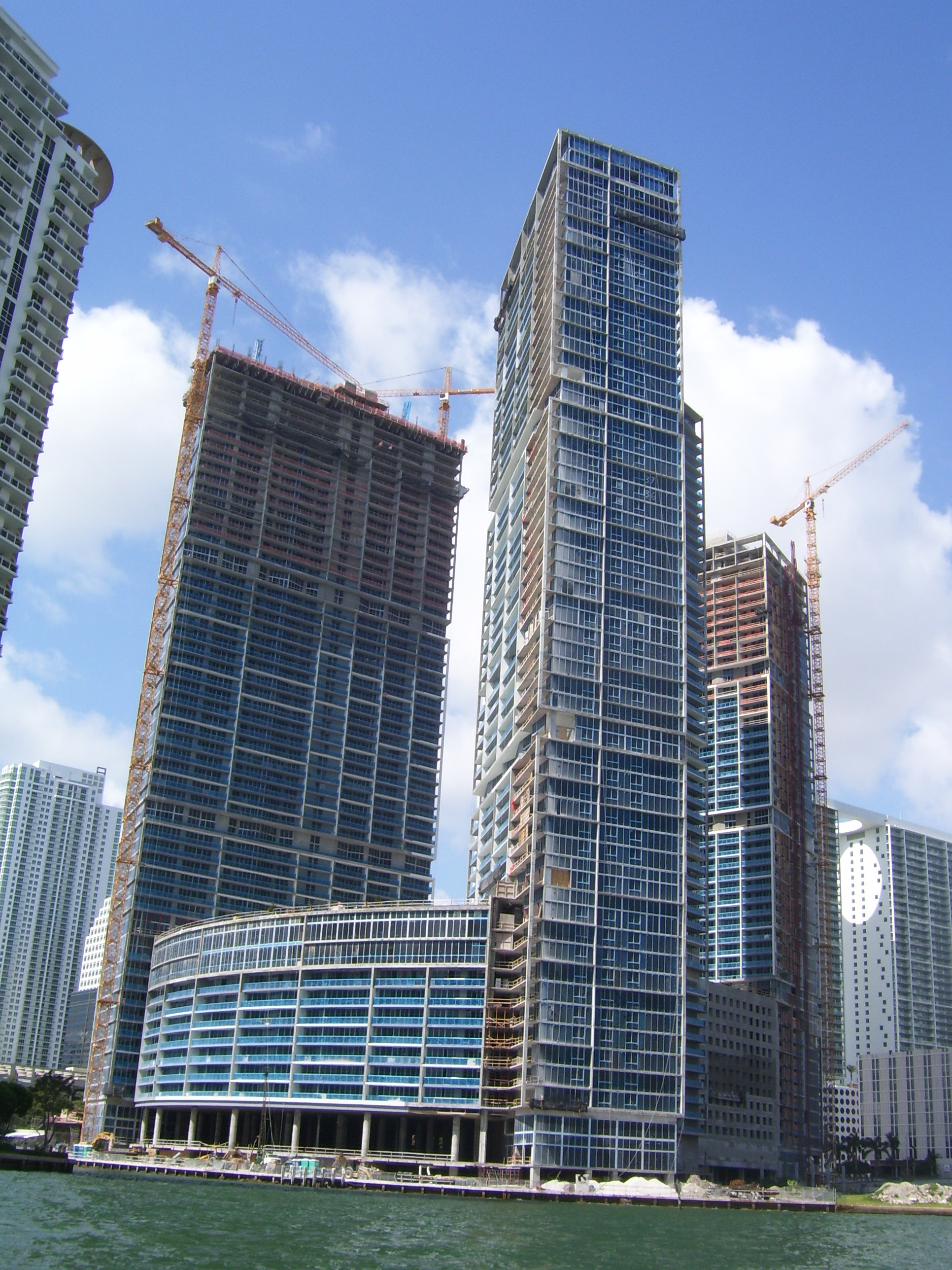
Icon Brickell Towers under construction from the Brickell Key bridge (Biscayne Bay)

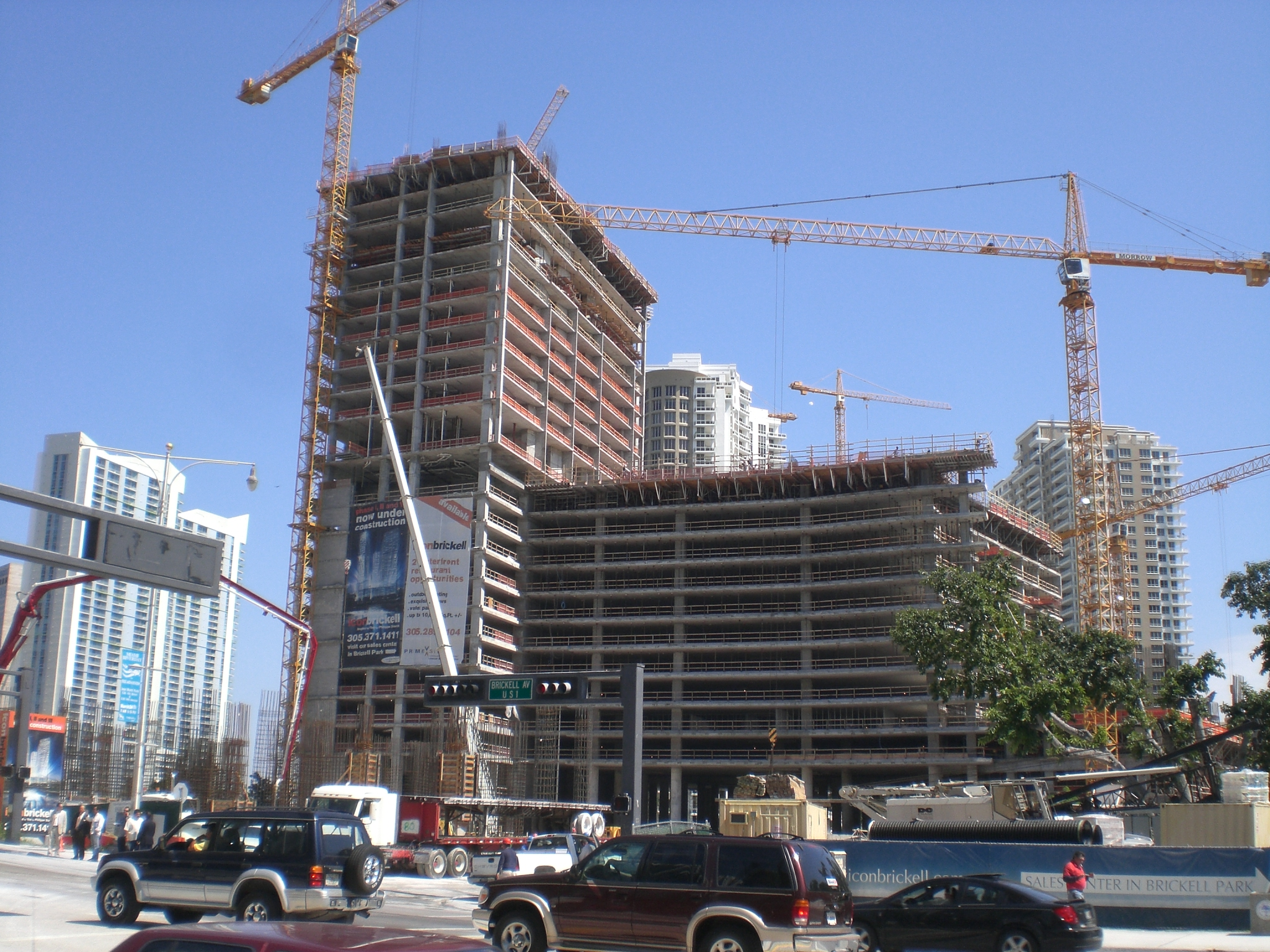
The Icon Brickell towers under construction in March 2007

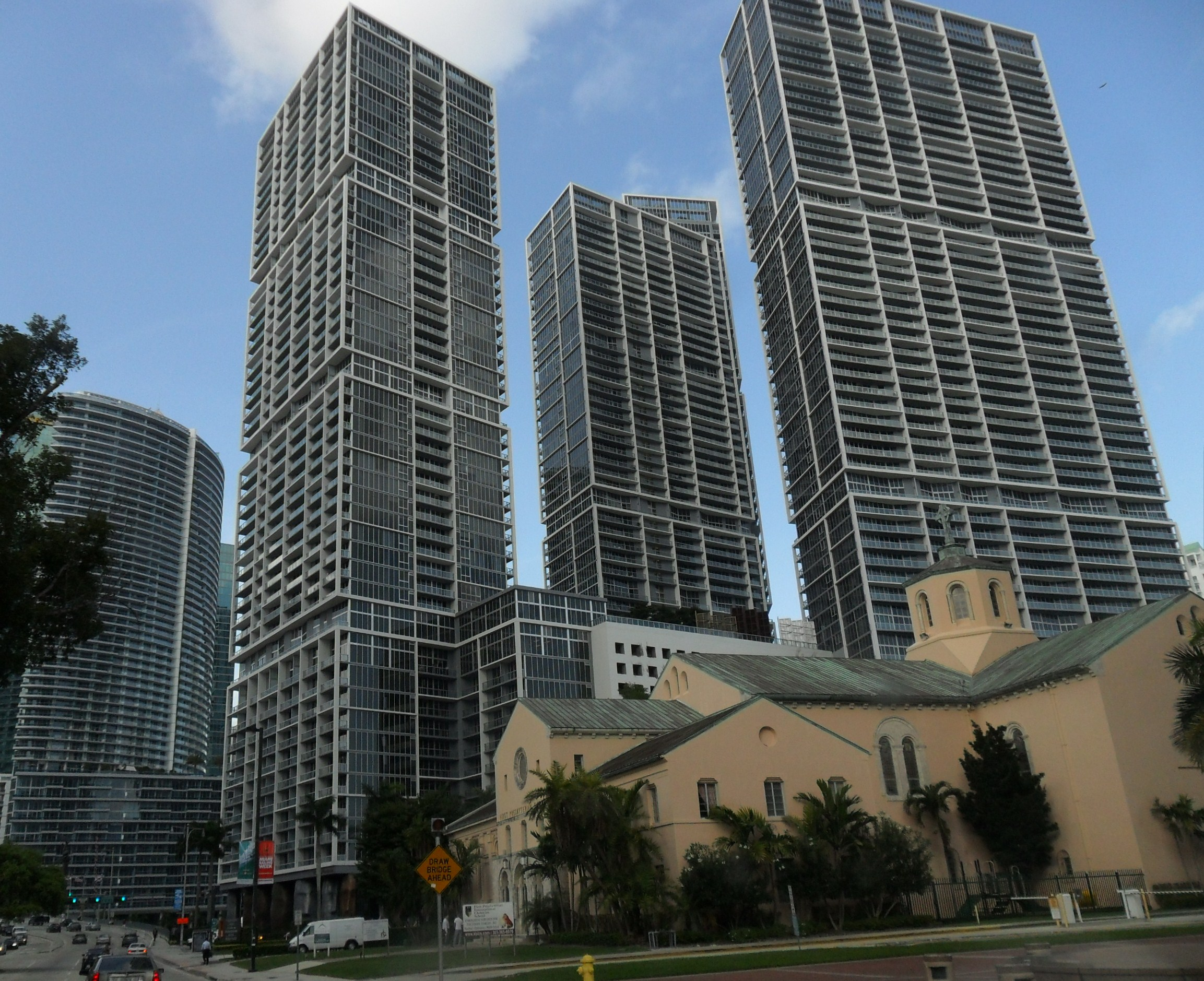
Icon Brickell Towers from the south on Brickell Avenue

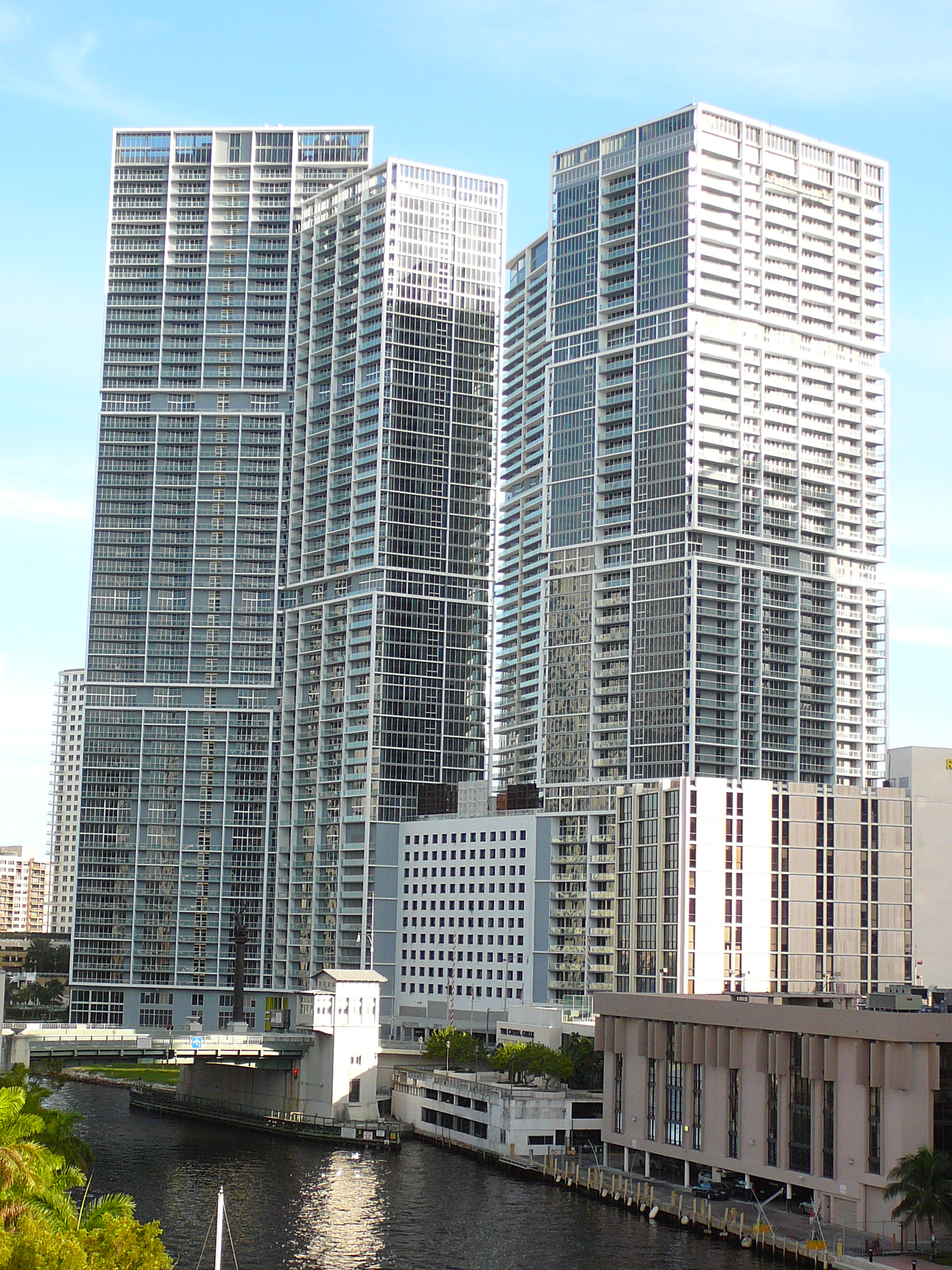
The Icon Brickell Towers in 2008 from the northwest

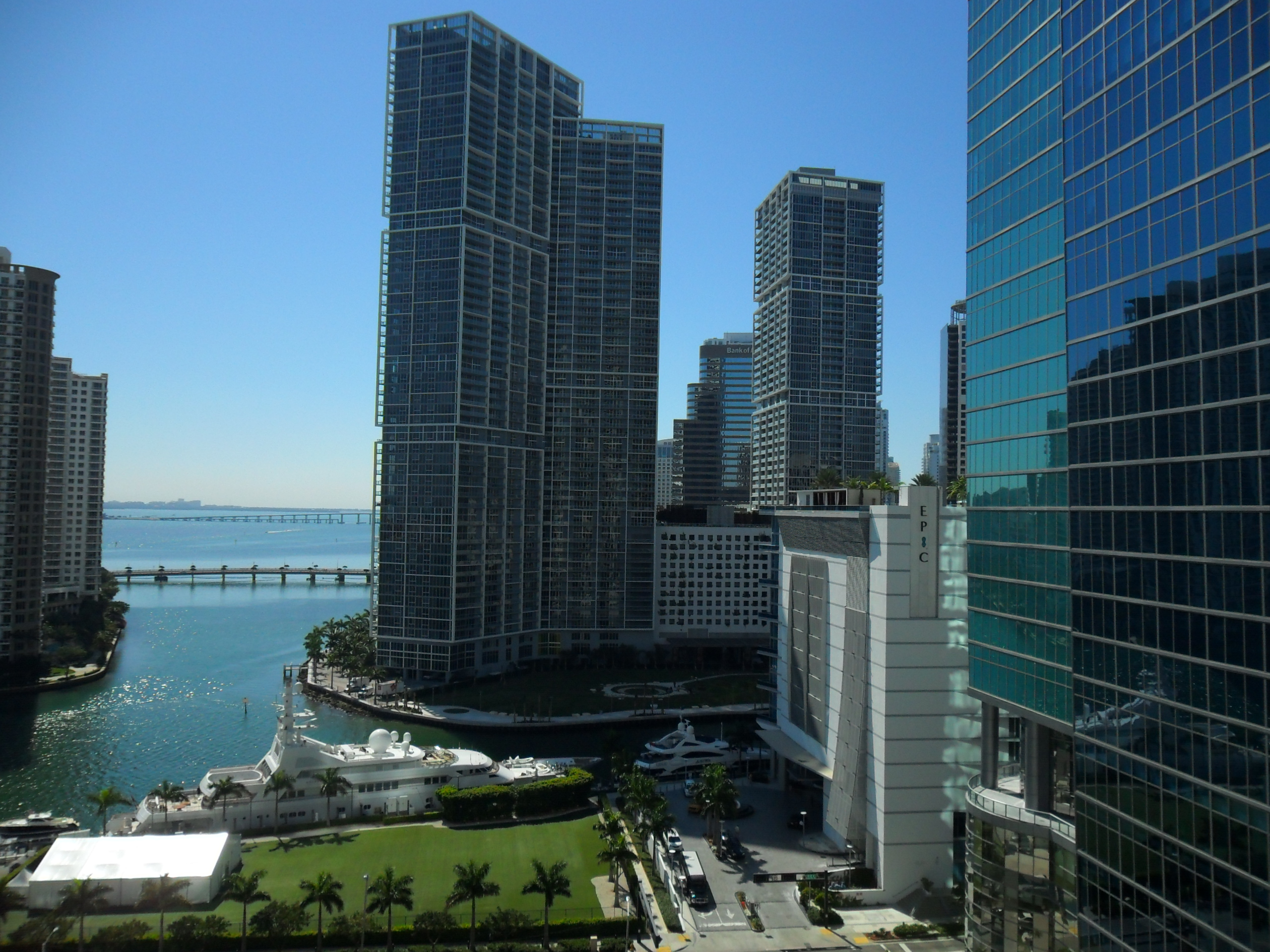
Icon Brickell viewed from the north from the Southeast Financial Center parking garage

== See also ==
- List of tallest buildings in Miami
