= Brickell Flatiron =

Residential skyscraper in the Brickell district of Miami, Florida

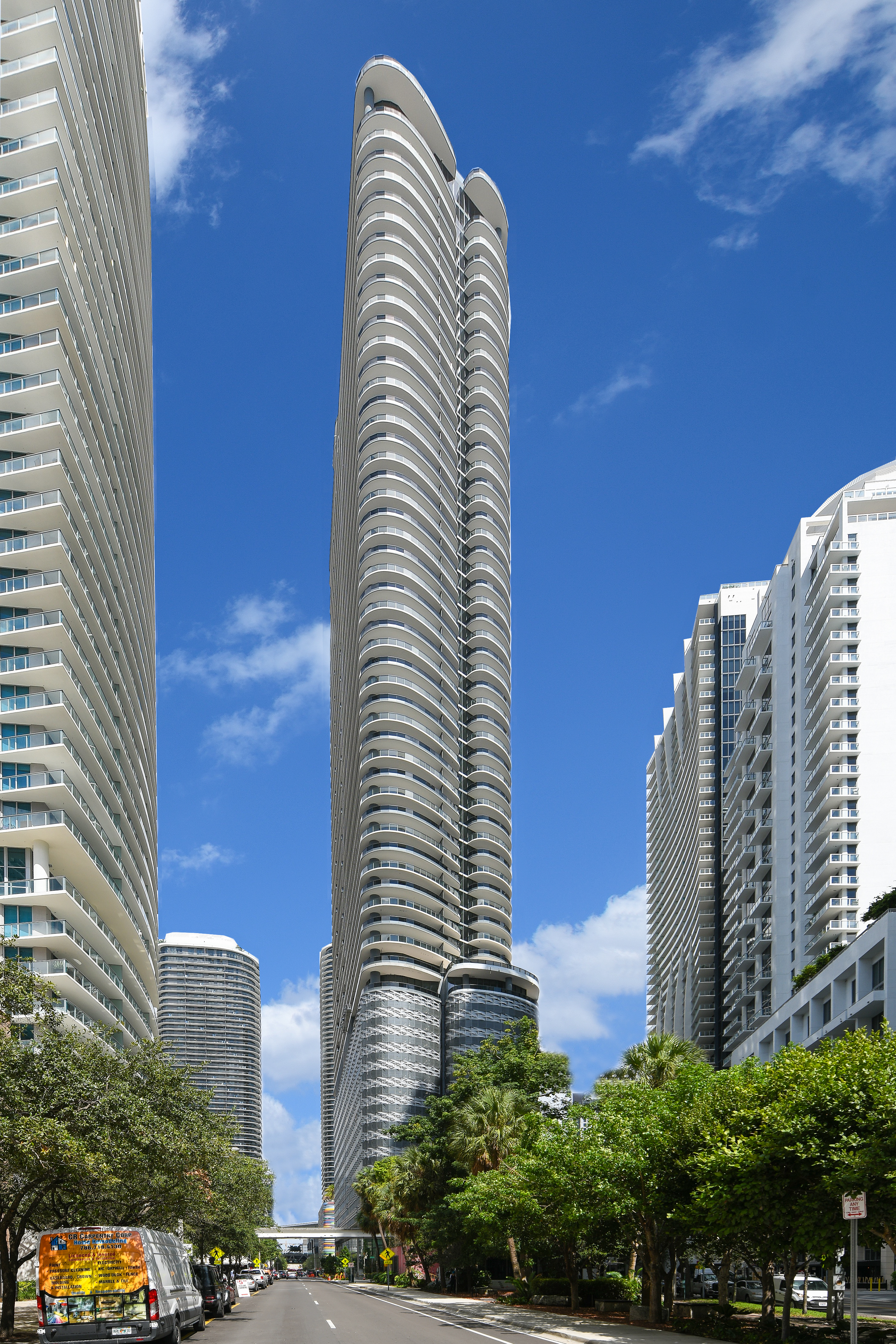
- Brickell Flatiron topping off in 2019
- Interactive map of the Brickell Flatiron area

General information
- Status: Completed
- Type: Residential
- Location: 1000 Brickell Plaza, Miami, Florida, United States
- Coordinates: 25.764°N 80.193°W
- Construction started: October 2015
- Completed: Summer 2019

Height
- Roof: 736 ft (224 m)

Technical details
- Floor count: 64
- Floor area: c. 230,000 sq ft (21,000 m^{2})

Design and construction
- Developer: CMC Group

Brickell Flatiron is a residential skyscraper in the Brickell district of Miami, Florida. Brickell Flatiron is 736 feet (224 m) tall, 64 stories, and has 527-units. The luxury condominium is named "flatiron" due to the triangular lot it is built on, similar to the Flatiron Building in New York City. The 698-foot-high tower is one of the tallest buildings in Miami.

== History ==
Brickell Flatiron was originally a proposed and approved mixed-use skyscraper by the City of Miami in 2006 with a Major Use Special Permit in the 2000s development boom and construction was expected to begin in 2008. The building was essentially put on hold then cancelled due to financial reasons during the Great Recession. When completed, it would have been the tallest building in Miami, at a height of 736 feet (224 m), and would have contained 70 floors.

The building was to be constructed spanning two lots that form a triangle lot at the fork where South Miami Avenue and Southeast 1st Avenue diverge in Miami's Brickell Financial District. It was to be built over Southeast 11th Street and the Metromover elevated track. As of June 2011, the site was still fenced off and vacant; in 2012 the small triangular parcel was temporarily converted into a park, much of which was replaced by construction of a sales center for the new building. The lots were then sold to the current developer, Ugo Colombo of CMC Group with Vladislav Doronin, who redesigned the tower to be located only on the larger lot. It was planned to contain 192,860 square feet (17,917 m^{2}) of office space and 40,000 square feet (4,000 m^{2}) of retail. It would have also featured a mechanical parking garage.

In 2017, CMC took out $236 million in construction financing, including $138.3 million from Bank of the Ozarks (now called Bank OZK), for Brickell Flatiron. Brickell Flatiron topped-off construction at the end of 2018 and received TCO (temporary certificate of occupancy) in October 2019. Brickell Flatiron, which was designed by architect Luis Revuelta, is among the tallest towers in Miami at 736 feet. The condo tower features interiors by Massimo Iosa Ghini of Italy's Iosa Ghini Associati. The developer is Ugo Colombo's CMC Group Inc.

== Gallery ==
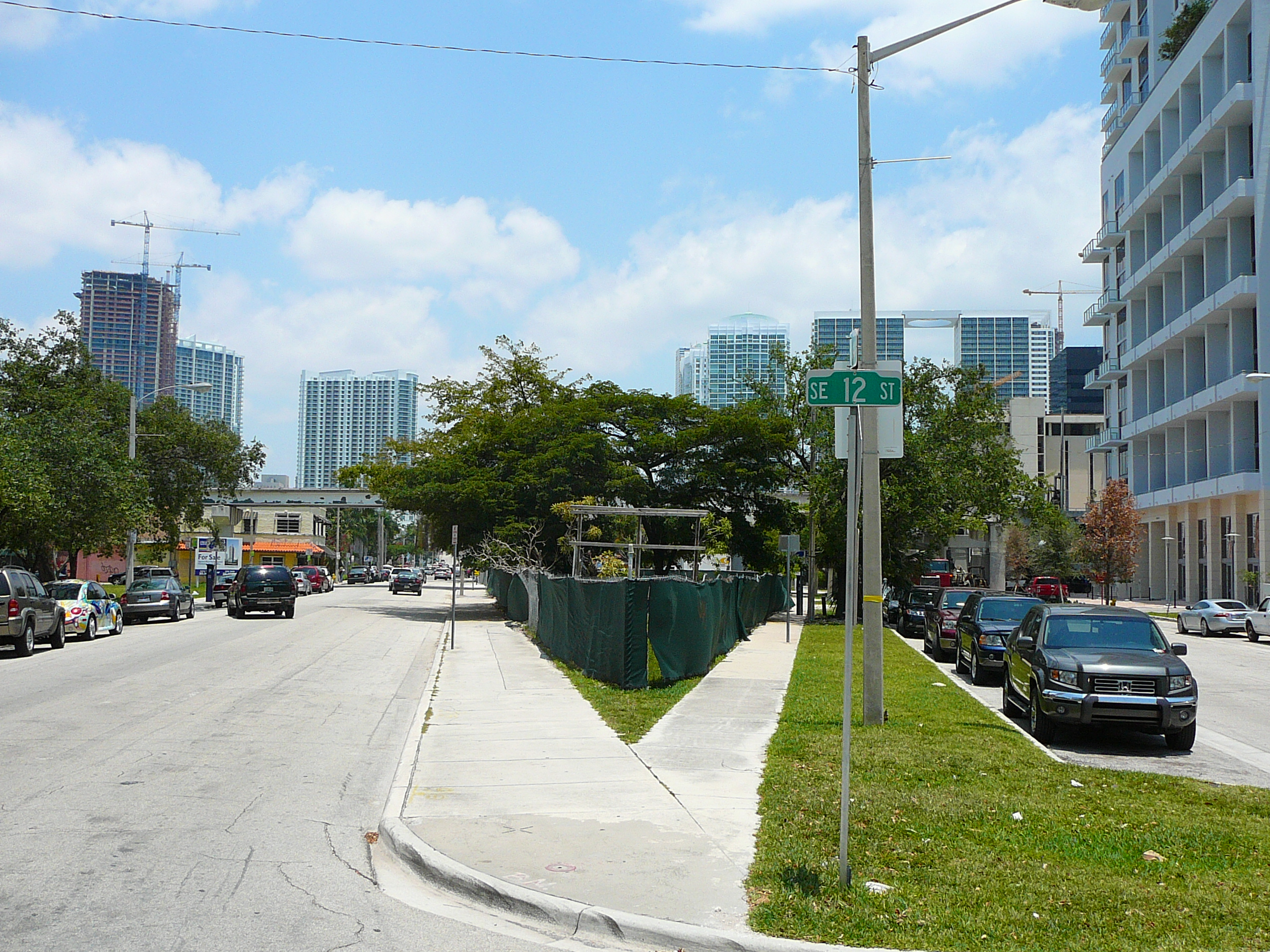
The smaller lot during initial pre-construction in 2008, stalled by housing market crash.

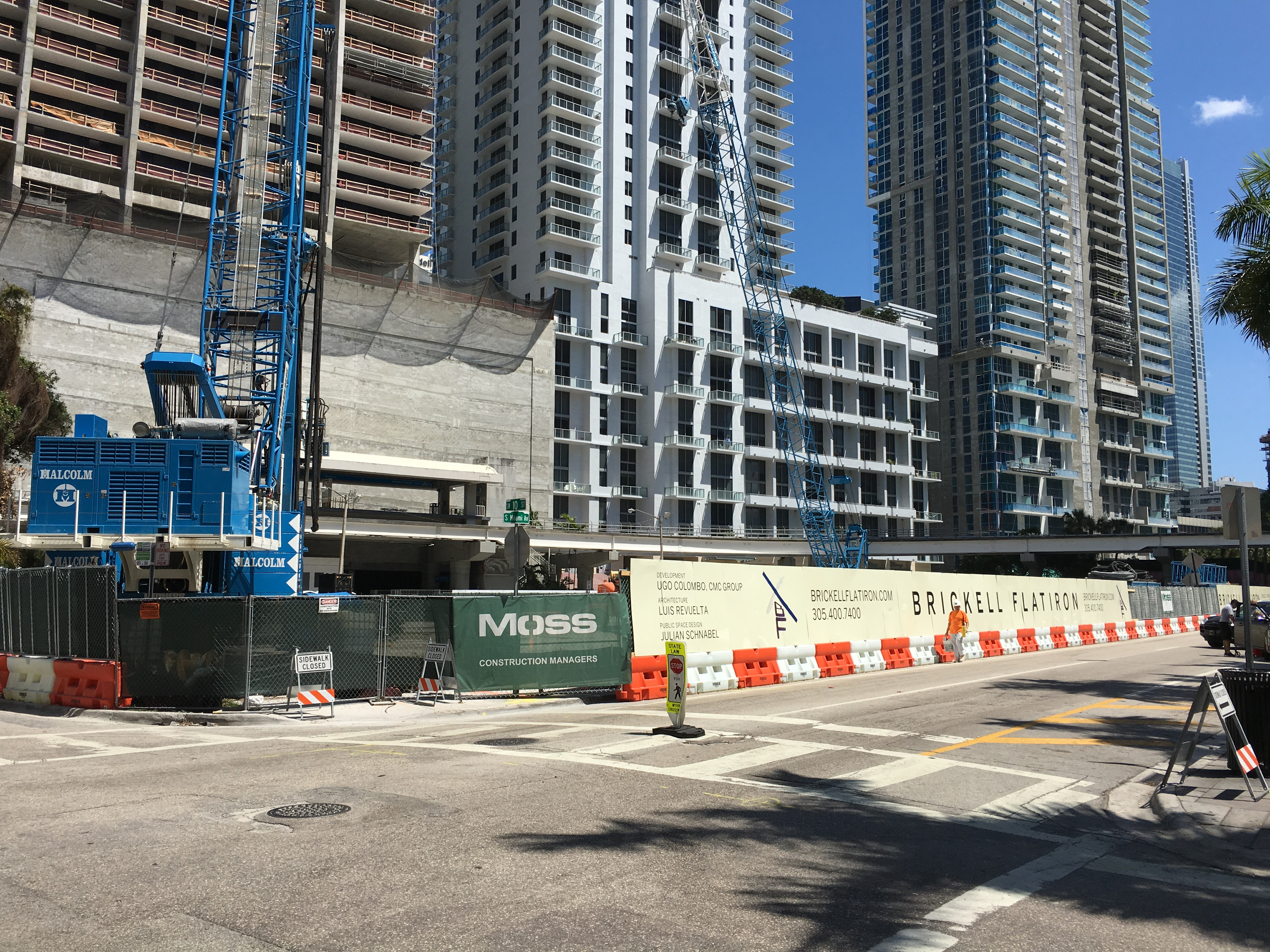
Brickell Flatiron under construction in 2016 amid a building boom in the 2010s.

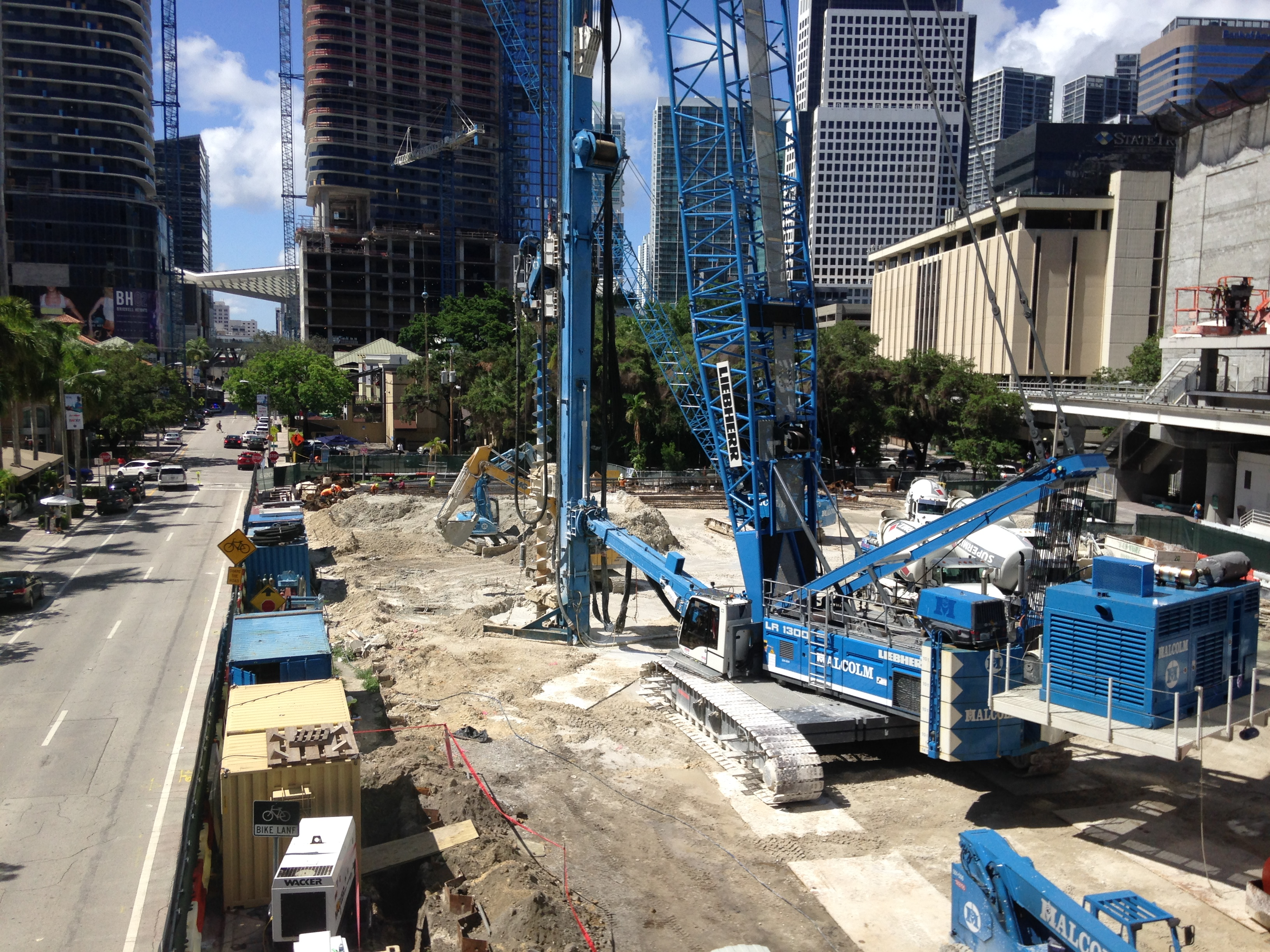

== See also ==
- List of tallest buildings in Miami
