= EPIC Miami Residences and Hotel =

Coordinates: 25.770534°N 80.189335°W

EPIC Miami Residences and Hotel was a two-building condo-hotel to be constructed in Miami, Florida by Lionstone Hotels and Resorts. Only the first phase, Epic Hotel & Residences was built. Lionstone bought the former DuPont Plaza Hotel in August 2001 with the intention of renovating it at a cost of $80 million, but instead demolished it between April 2004 and January 2005.

Lionstone formed a partnership with Ugo Colombo to develop the site of the former DuPont Plaza Hotel into EPIC Miami Residences and Hotel, a mixed-use development, at a cost of US$370 million. The first 342-unit tower, Epic, was completed in 2008, to be followed by a second nearly 600-unit tower. The 414-room hotel is currently managed by Kimpton Hotels.

The second phase was cancelled during the recession, and the land was sold at a record unit price of $100 million per acre, at $125 million for the 1.25-acre (0.51-hectare) lot.
