= Dupont Plaza Hotel (Miami) =

Hotel in Miami, Florida, 1957–2004

Coordinates: 25°46′14.06″N 80°11′20.89″W

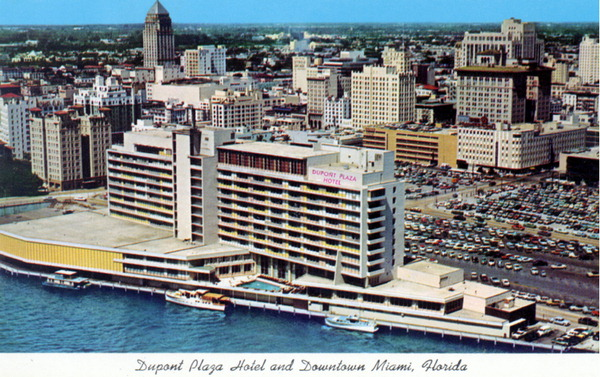
Dupont Plaza Hotel

The Dupont Plaza Hotel was a major hotel in downtown Miami, Florida from 1957 until 2004. It occupied a section of the former site of the Royal Palm Hotel. The Dupont Plaza Hotel was the first major hotel of its generation built in downtown Miami since the collapse of the tourist boom in 1926. Popular till the 1960s, the Dupont Plaza Hotel was a coveted destination for domestic visitors. It did get a resurgence of interest in the 1980s and early 1990s, but then suffered some financial troubles.

Lionstone Hotels and Resorts bought the remaining land of the former Dupont Plaza Hotel in August 2001. Originally, Lionstone was going to completely renovate the hotel for $80 million, but changed its mind and decided to demolish the existing structure and start anew. Renovations were going to include extended stay hotel rooms and a trade center to replace office space. Demolitions for the Dupont Plaza Hotel was started in April 2004 and completed in January 2005.

== See also ==
- EPIC Miami Residences and Hotel, development that replaced the hotel at the site
