= Santa Maria (building) =

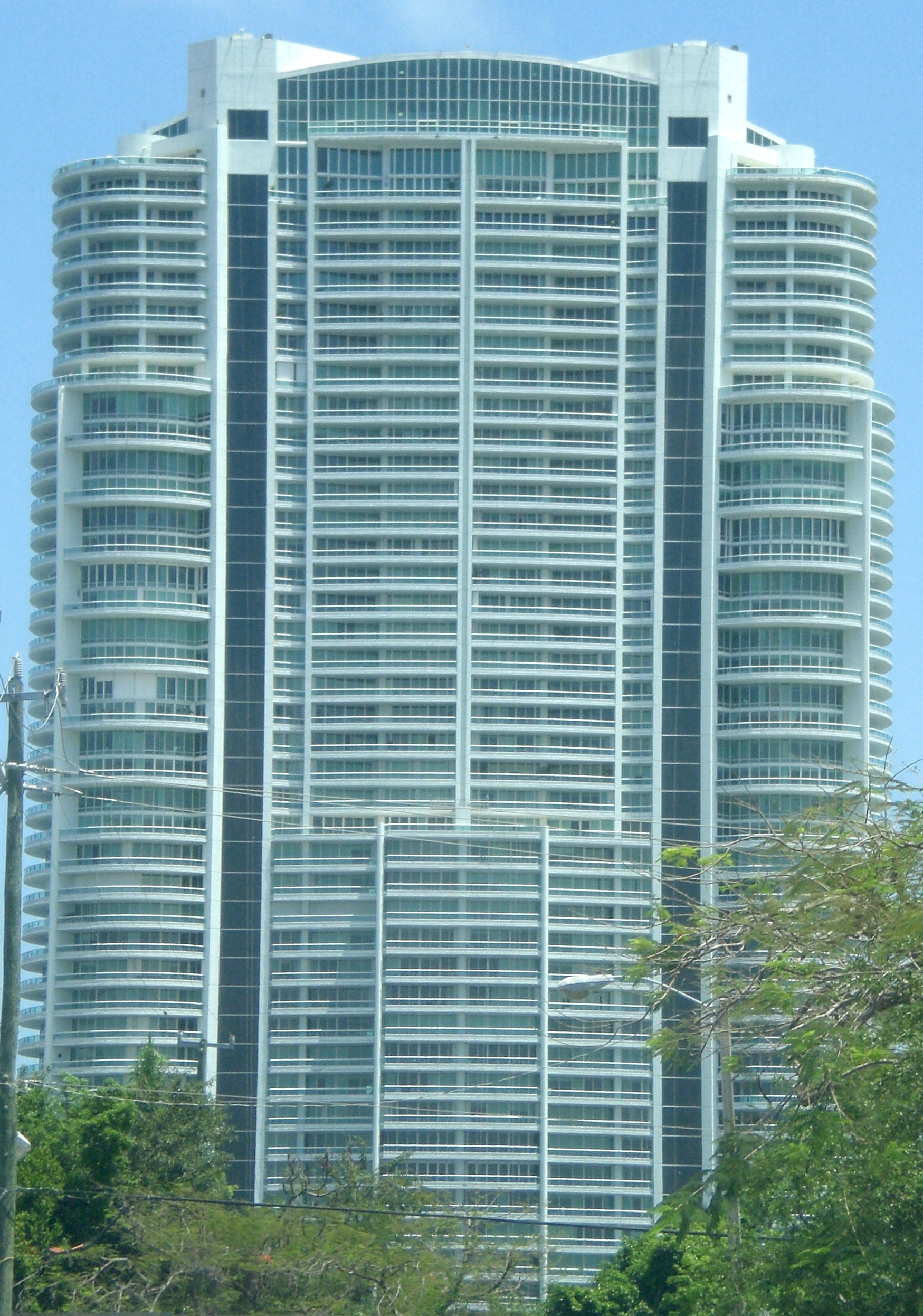
- Santa Maria
- Interactive map of the Santa Maria area

General information
- Location: 1643 Brickell Avenue, Miami, Florida
- Coordinates: 25.755405°N 80.194839°W
- Construction started: 1994
- Completed: 1997
- Opening: 1997

Height
- Roof: 520 ft (160 m)

Technical details
- Floor count: 51

Design and construction
- Architect: Revuelta Vega Leon

The Santa Maria is a residential skyscraper in the City of Miami, Florida, United States. The building is located in the city's Brickell neighborhood, south of Downtown. The building has 51 floors and is 520 feet (160 m) tall. The address is 1643 Brickell Avenue. The building is just a short distance from the Brickell Financial District. The building was completed in 1997, before the most recent major building booms in Miami began in the 2000s and again since 2012.

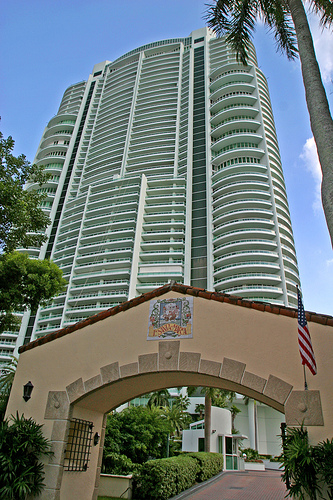
View of main entrance

== See also ==
- List of tallest buildings in Miami
