= Epic Residences & Hotel =

Epic Hotel and Residences
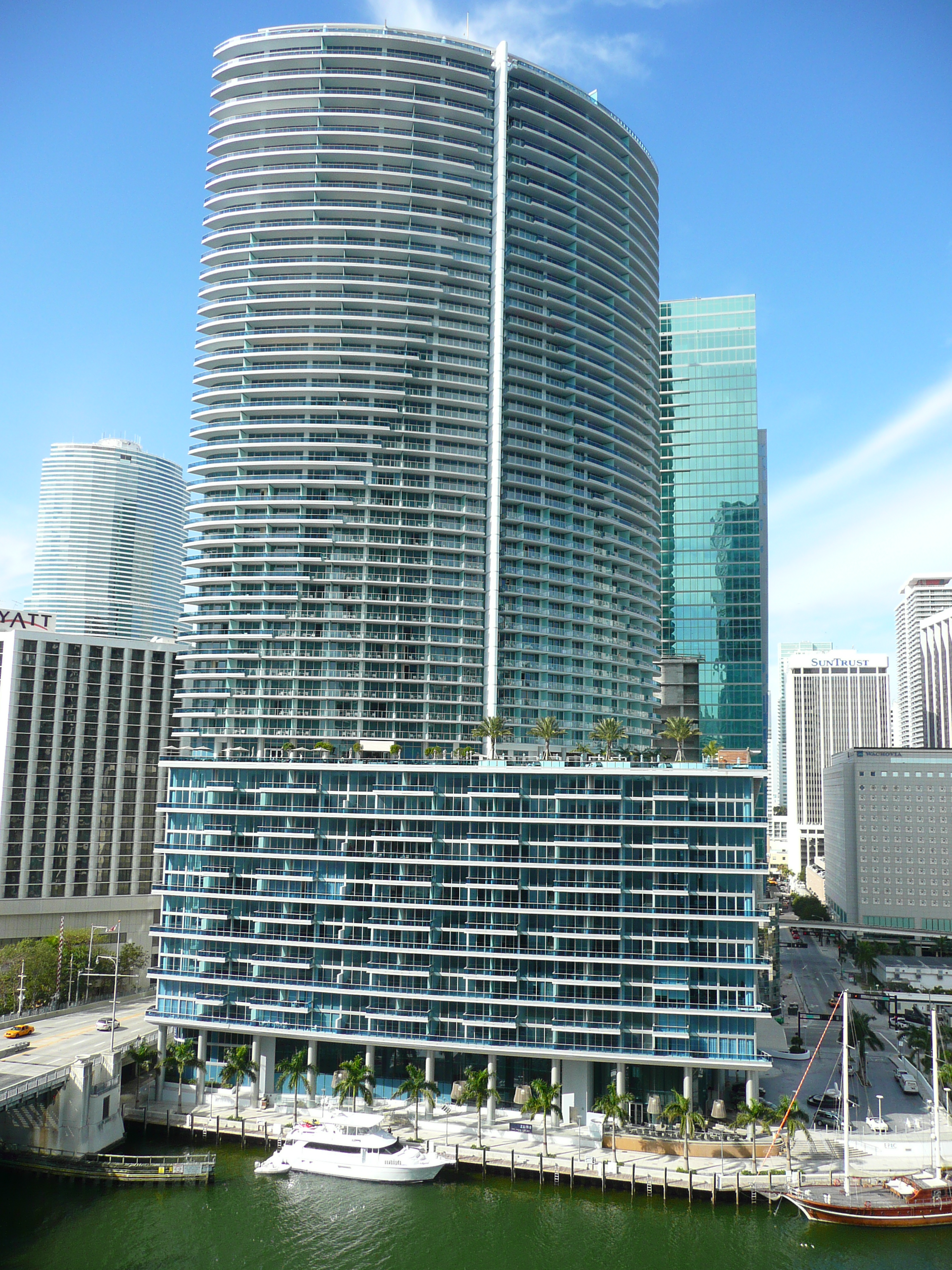
- Interactive map of the Epic Hotel and Residences area

General information
- Status: Completed
- Type: Hotel and Residential
- Location: 270 Biscayne Boulevard Way, Miami, Florida, United States
- Coordinates: 25.770504°N 80.189583°W
- Construction started: 2006
- Completed: 2008
- Opening: 2008

Height
- Roof: 601 ft (183 m)

Technical details
- Floor count: 54

Design and construction
- Architect: Revuelta Vega Leon
- Developer: DP Property Holding
- Structural engineer: DeSimone Consulting Engineers

Epic Hotel is an urban hotel and residential skyscraper in Downtown Miami, Florida, United States. Epic is 601 feet (183 m) tall and has 54 floors. The tower is located on the north bank of the Miami River in Downtown Miami's Central Business District. It is bordered by Biscayne Boulevard Way on the west, Southeast 2nd Street to the north, the Miami River to the south, and Southeast 5th Avenue to the east. The architect of the complex is Revuelta Vega Leon.

Epic was part of the EPIC Miami Residences and Hotel two-tower residential complex, consisting of the Epic Tower and the Dupont Tower, but the taller of the two, Dupont Tower, was canceled. If it had been built, the Dupont Tower would have stood 609 ft (186 m) tall and contain 60 floors. The Dupont Tower was named after the Alfred I. DuPont Building, a National Historic Building from the 1930s that is also in Miami. In 2014, the 1.25-acre (0.51-hectare) Epic 2 site sold for US$125 million, a record-breaking rate of $100 million per acre.

== See also ==
- List of tallest buildings in Miami

== Sources ==
- Epic on Emporis
