= Brickell Avenue =

Major street in Miami

Coordinates: 25.766233°N 80.190711°W

Brickell Avenue

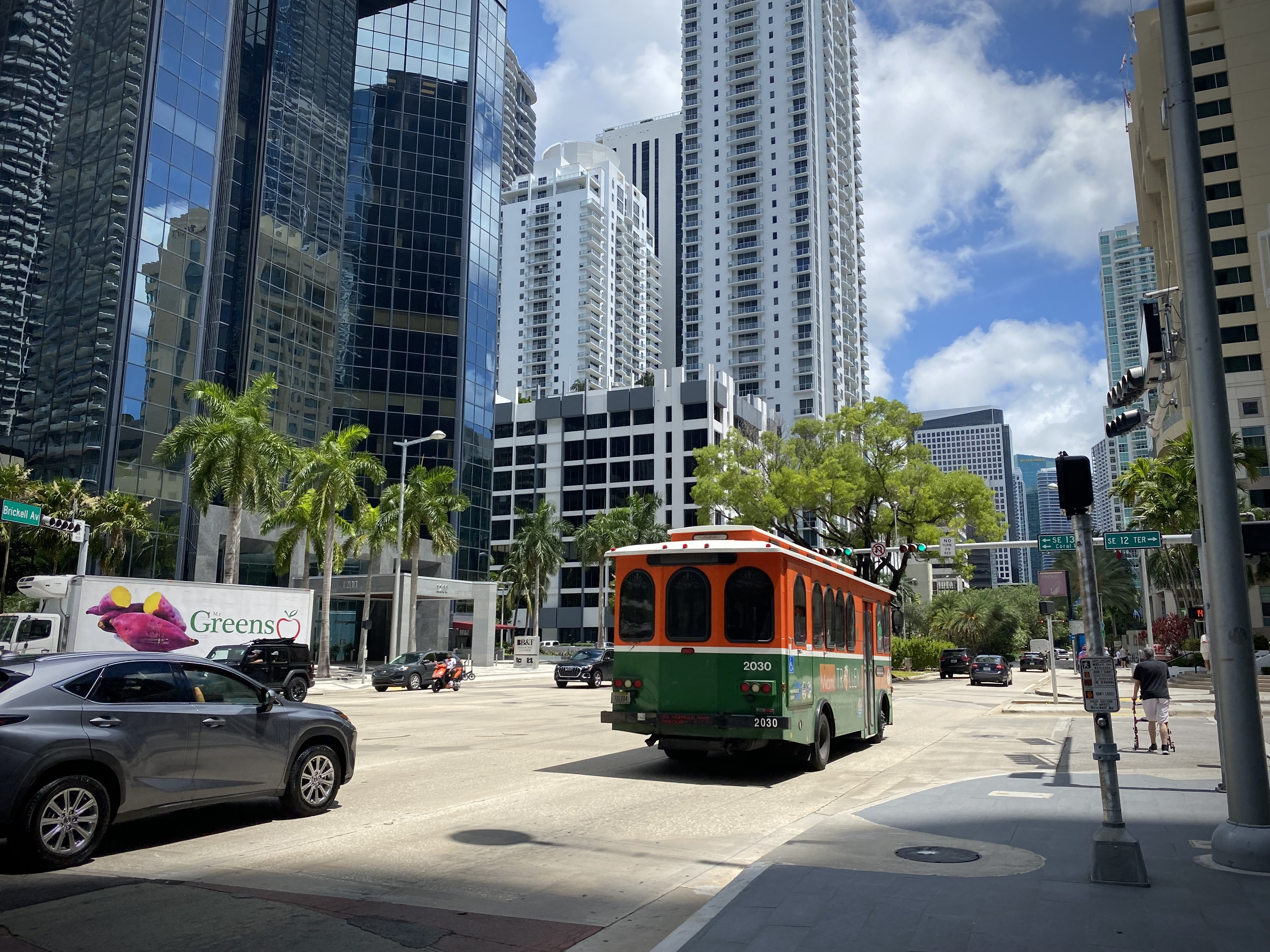

Route information
- Length: 1.8 mi (2.9 km)
- Existed: 1898–present

Major junctions
- South end: US 1 (Dixie Highway) in Miami
- US 41 in Miami
- North end: US 1 (Biscayne Boulevard Way) in Miami

Location
- Country: United States
- Counties: Miami-Dade

Highway system
- United States Numbered Highway System; List; Special; Divided

Brickell Avenue is a north–south road that is part of U.S. Route 1, in Miami, Florida, and is 1.9 miles southeast of the Miami River. North of the Brickell Avenue Bridge, U.S. Route 1 is known as Biscayne Boulevard. Brickell Avenue is the main road through the Brickell financial district of Downtown Miami and is considered the Park Avenue of Florida. Brickell Avenue is lined with high-rise office buildings and residential condominiums, as well as many banks and restaurants. It is also famed for "Millionaire Row's" home to a cluster of Miami's most expensive residences.

It is a grid plan main north–south thoroughfare through the south part of Miami's central business district.

== Route description ==
Brickell Avenue from the Miami River south it continues south-southwest and upon crossing Broadway/SE 15th Street it curves southwest and continues in that direction until it terminates at Southeast 26th Road/Rickenbacker Causeway, becoming South Federal Highway for a short distance (about 1/4 mile) until it becomes South Dixie Highway - US1. The portion north of the one-way pair of 7th and 8th Streets carries U.S. Route 41.

== Major intersections ==
The entire route is in Miami, Miami-Dade County.

mi	km	Destinations	Notes
0.0	0.0	US 1 south (Dixie Highway) / SR 913 (SE 26th Road) to I-95 north	Access to tolled Rickenbacker Causeway via SR 913 east
1.1	1.8	SR 972 west (SE 13th Street / Coral Way)	Eastern terminus of SR 972
1.5	2.4	US 41 west (SE 8th & 7th Streets) to I-95	Eastern terminus of US 41
1.7	2.7	Brickell Avenue Bridge over the Miami River	
1.8	2.9	US 1 north (SE 4th Street / Biscayne Boulevard Way)	
1.000 mi = 1.609 km; 1.000 km = 0.621 mi

== Notable attractions ==
Brickell's cultural significance has arguably surpassed downtown because its bar and restaurant zone brings in large crowds well into late night - early morning hours. Popular restaurants on Brickell Avenue include Komodo, La Petit Maison, Truluck's, and Cipriani. Many of its restaurants transform from bright, open restaurants during the day to inviting and sensual by night. Some of the places include Barsecco, Baby Jane Cocktail & Noodle Bar, and The Bar at Level 25.

There are also a few historic places on Brickell Avenue, including Brickell Mausoleum and Villa Serena, a home built on the former "Millioniare's Mile" for William Jennings Bryan, a former politician, in 1913.

== Gallery ==
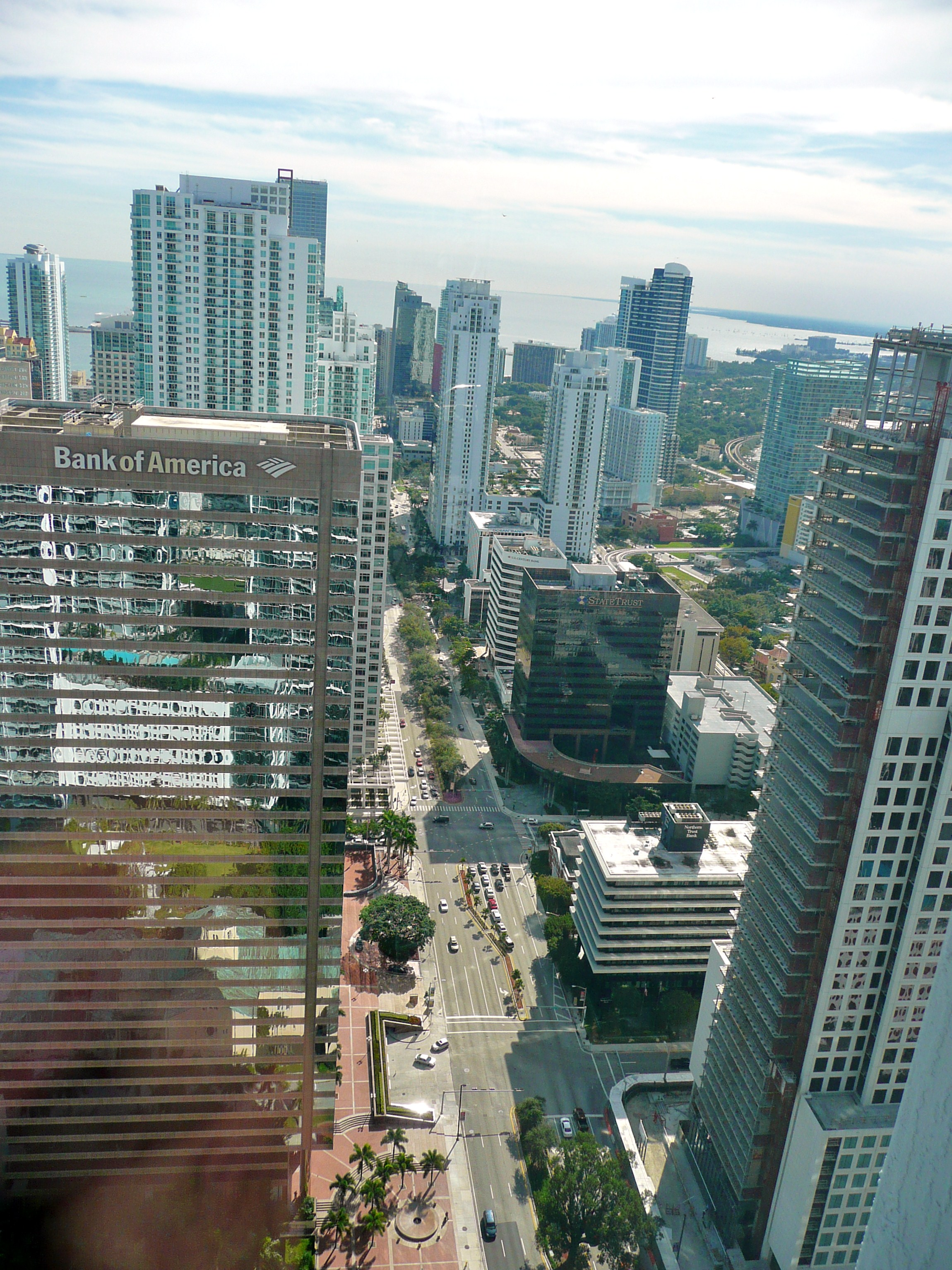
Aerial view of Brickell Avenue, as seen from the Viceroy Tower's skydeck

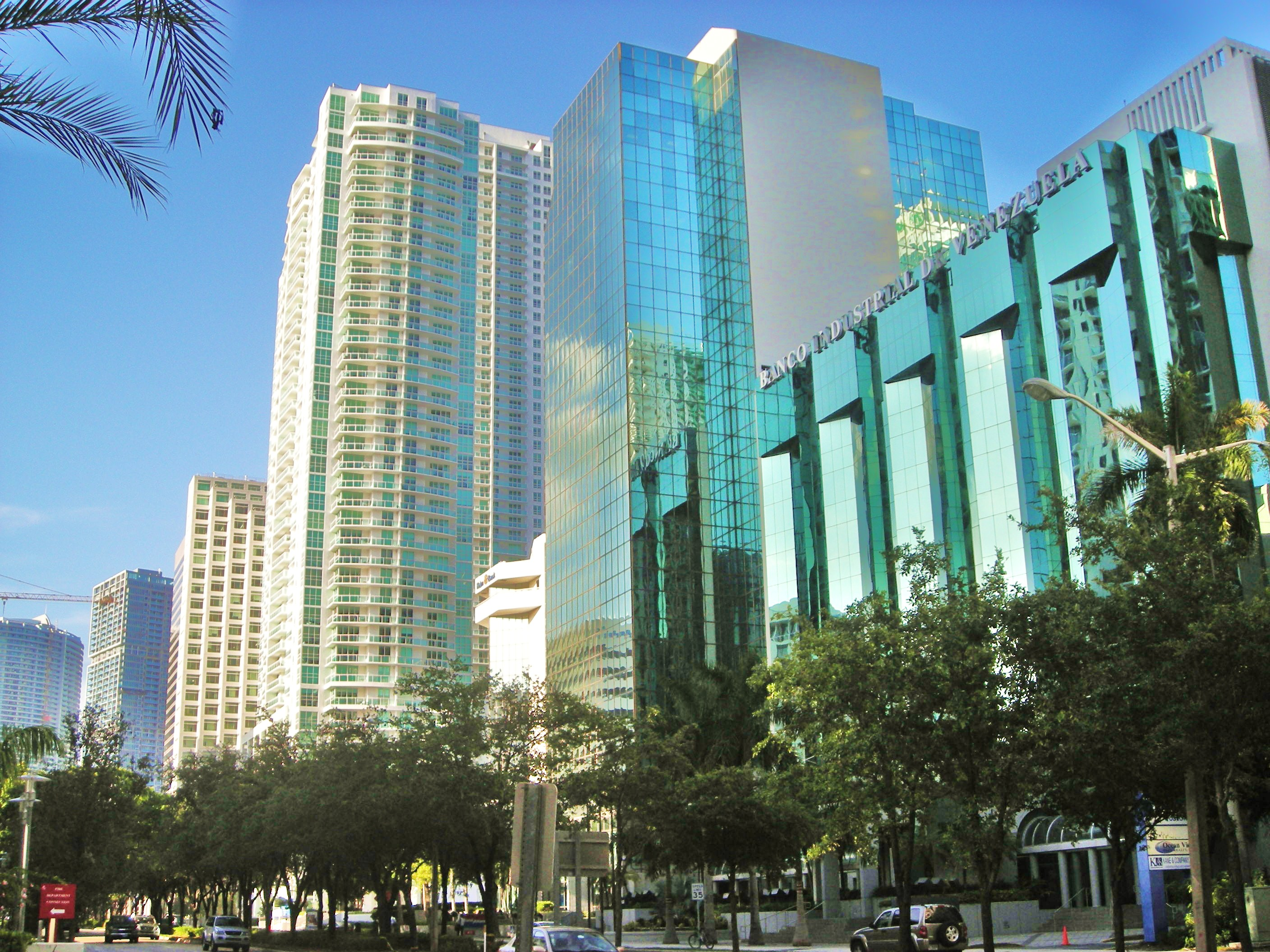

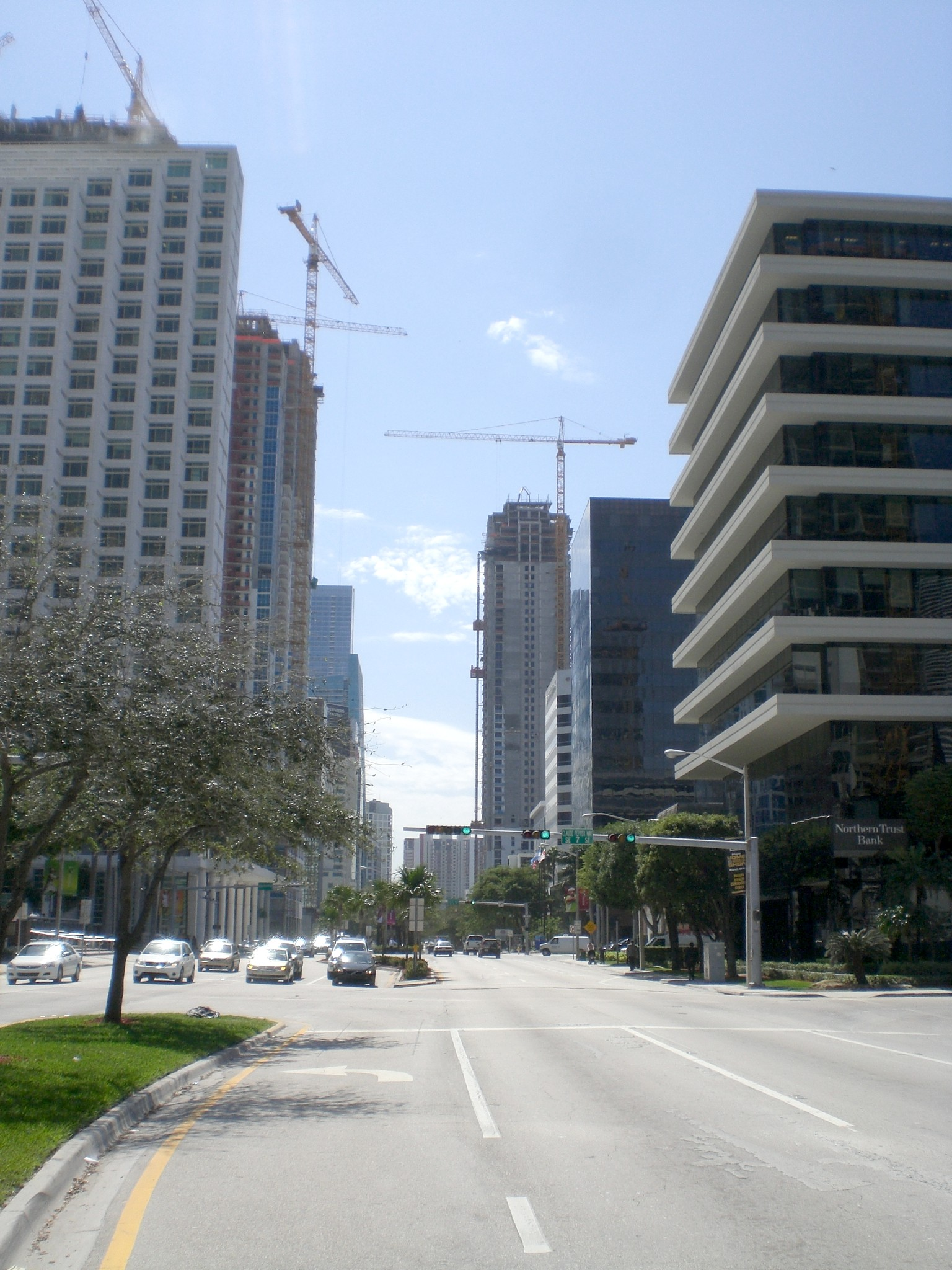
Looking south

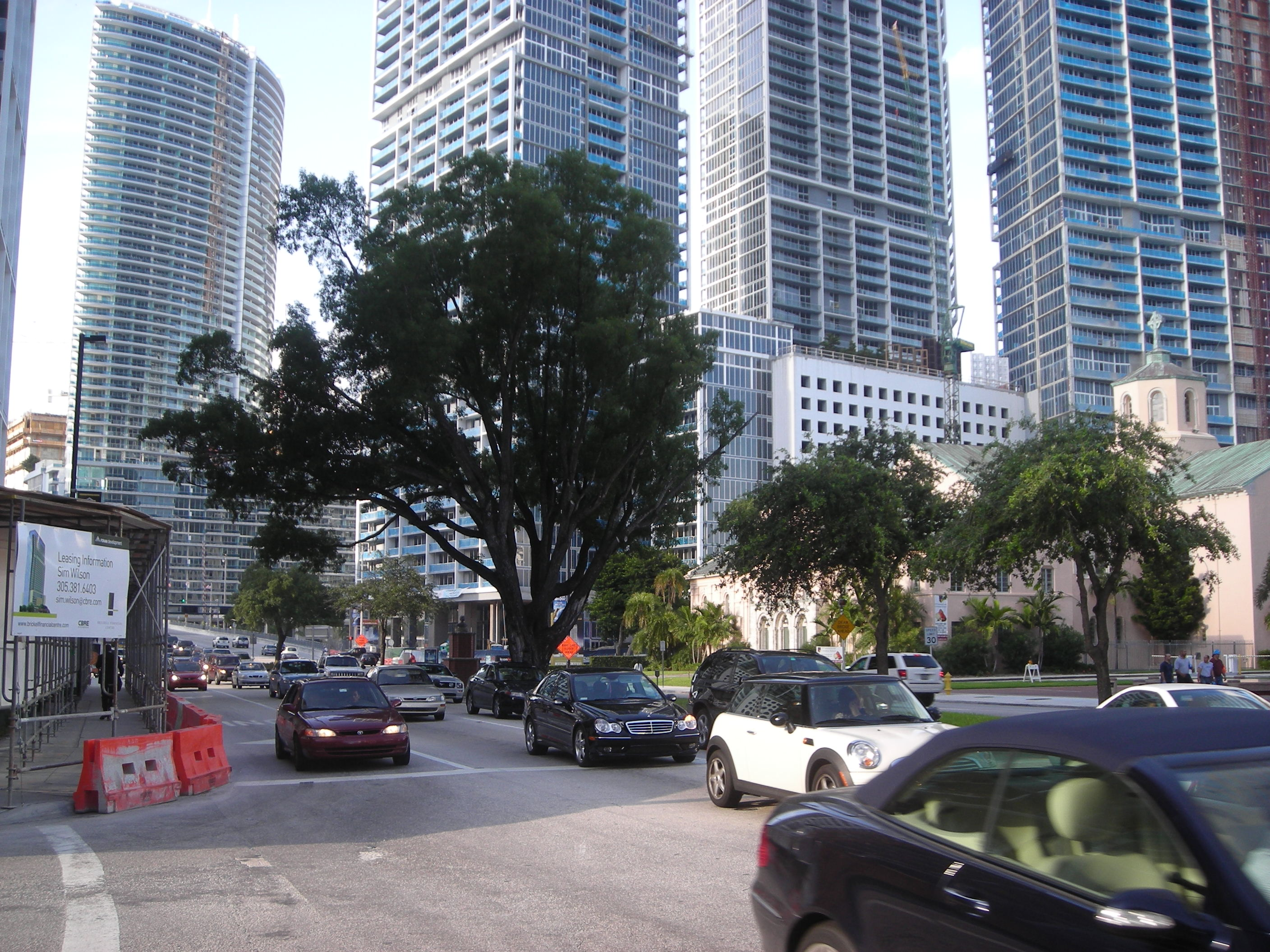
Looking north

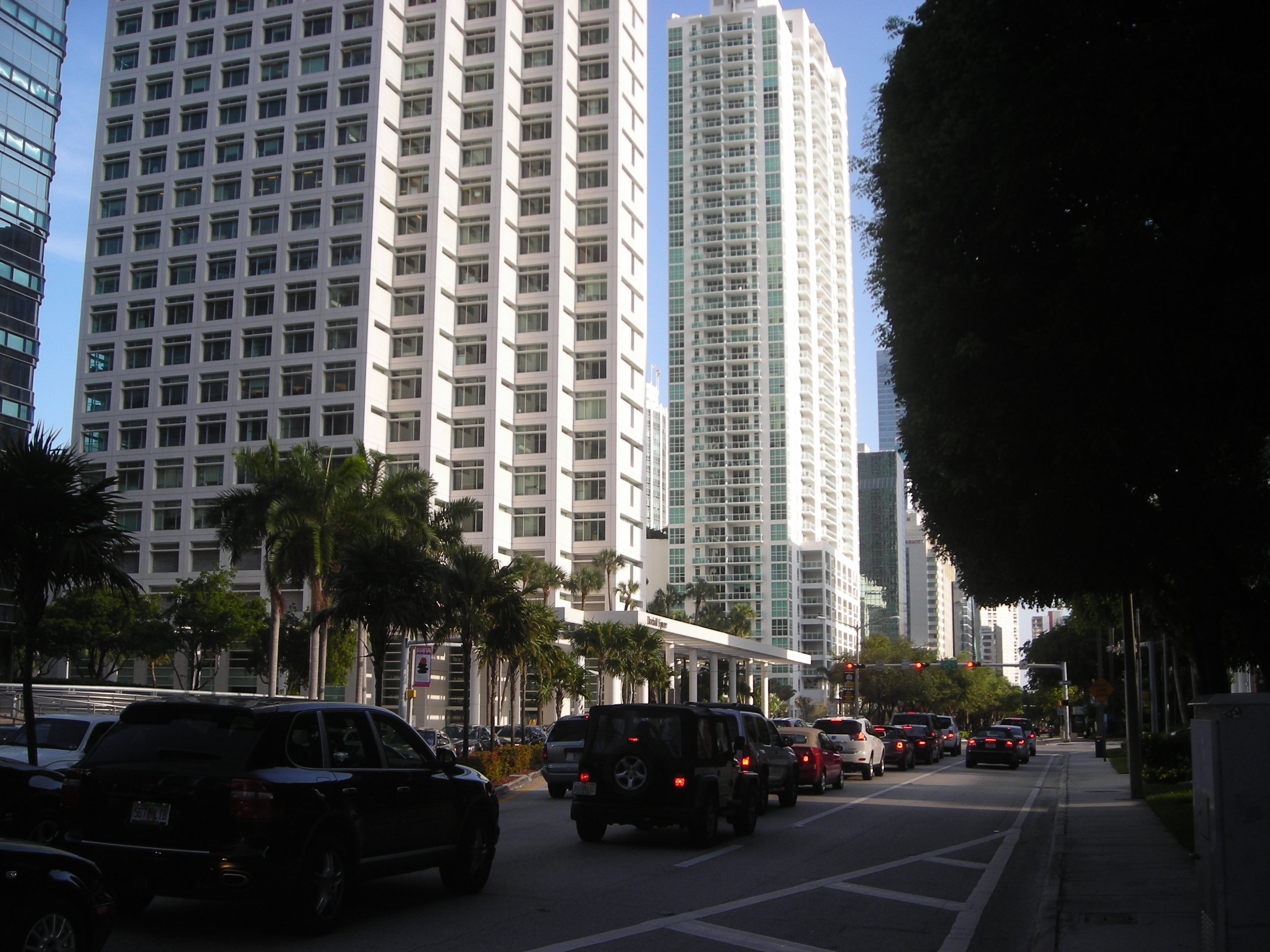
