= Blue on the Bay =

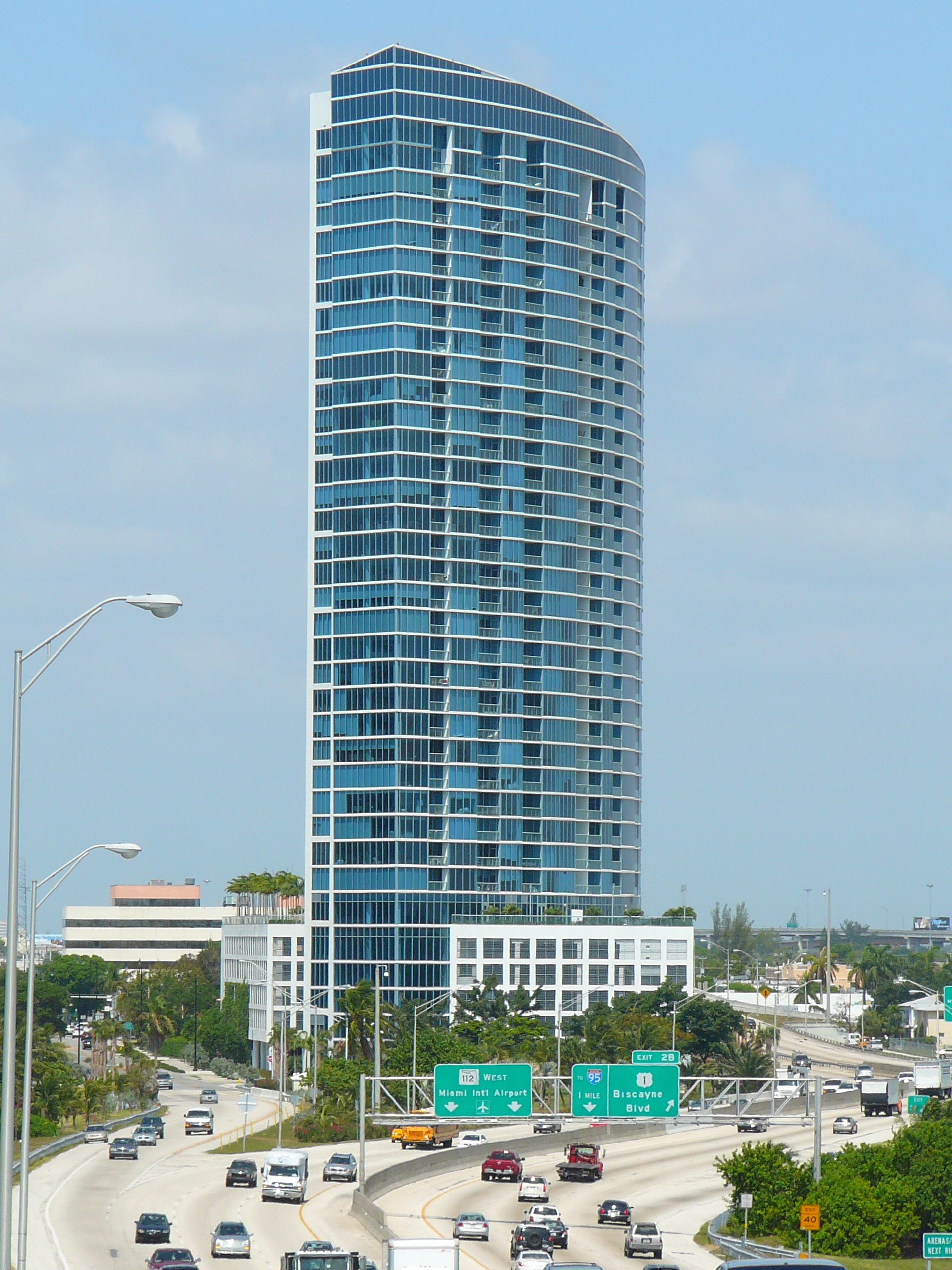
- Blue on the Bay in Midtown Miami, from the east

General information
- Type: Residential
- Location: 601 Northeast 36th Street, Miami, Florida, United States
- Coordinates: 25.811069°N 80.186572°W
- Construction started: 2002
- Completed: 2005
- Opening: 2005

Height
- Roof: 425 ft (130 m)

Technical details
- Floor count: 37

Design and construction
- Architect: Arquitectonica

Blue on the Bay is a skyscraper in the City of Miami, Florida, United States. It is located in the northern part of the city, near Midtown Miami and in the Edgewater neighborhood. Completed in 2005, it was part of the recent building boom in Miami. It is 425 feet (130 m) tall, and contains 37 floors. Floors 1-3 are used for retail, and floors 4-36 are residential units. The building is located between Northeast 36th Street and Interstate-195 at Northeast 5th Avenue.

== See also ==
- List of tallest buildings in Miami

== Gallery ==
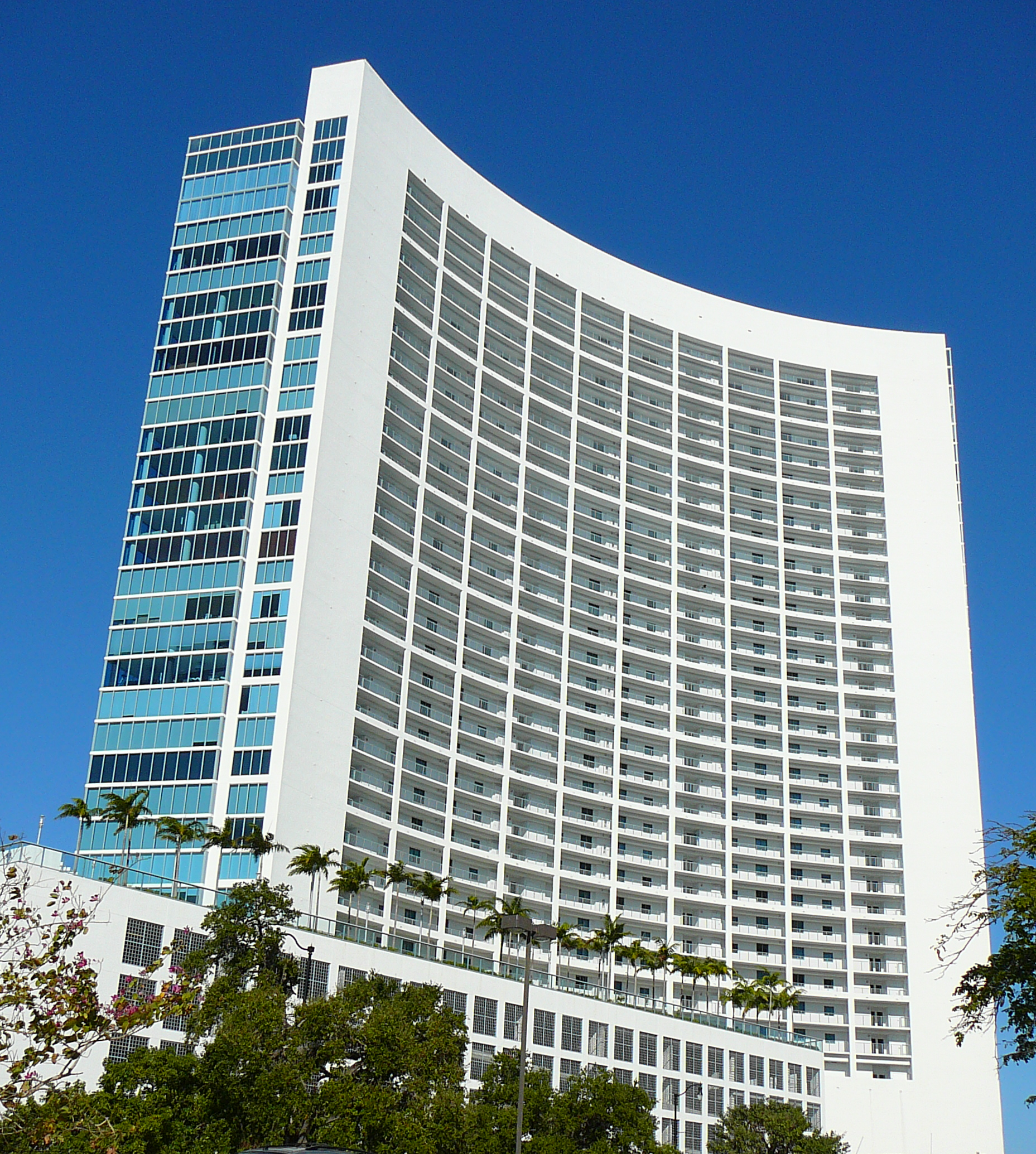
Blue on the Bay from the southwest
