= Aria on the Bay =

Building in Miami, Florida, United States

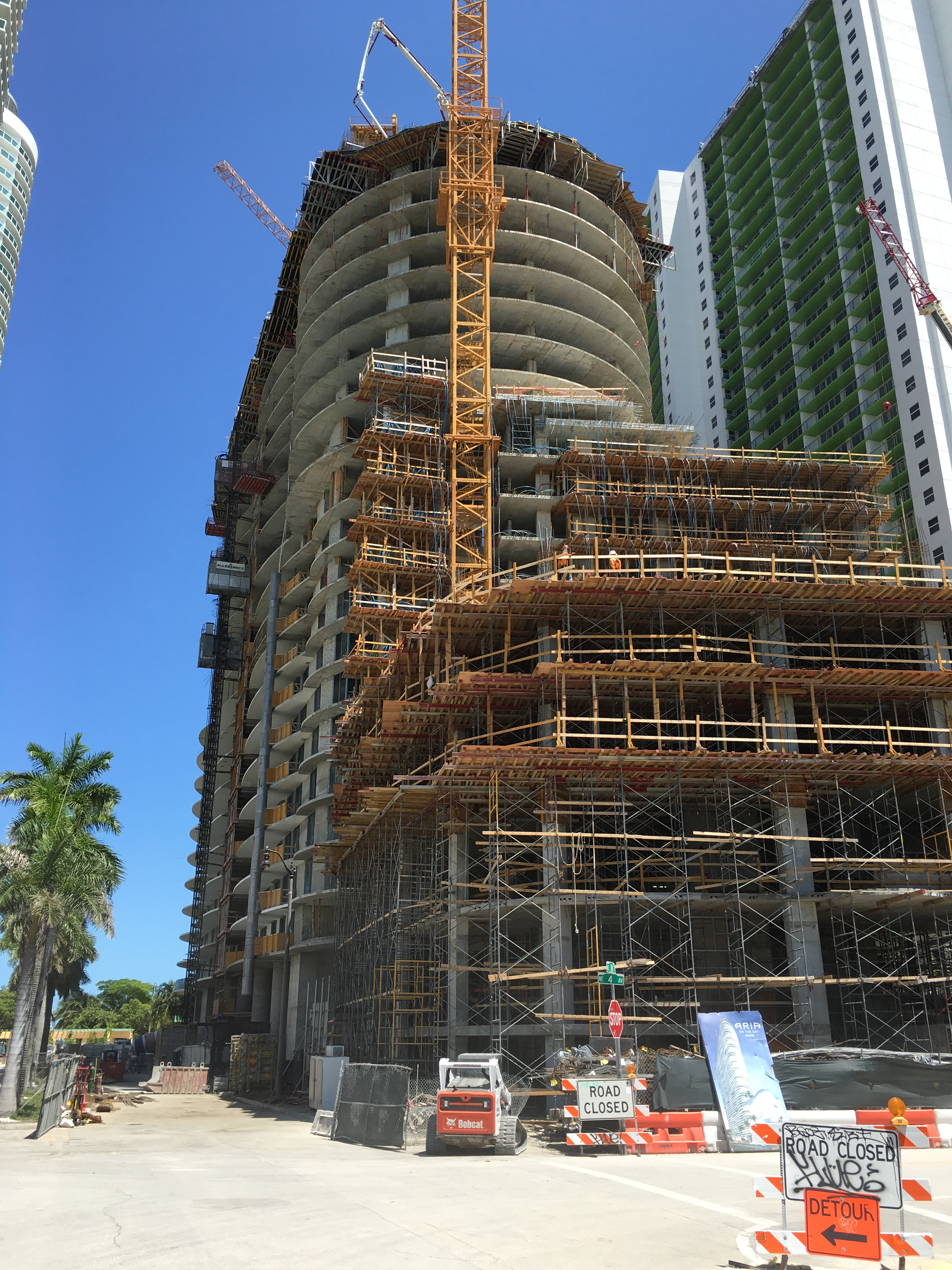
- August 2016
- Interactive map of the Aria on the Bay area

General information
- Status: Completed
- Type: Residential
- Location: 1770 North Bayshore Dr, Miami, Florida, United States
- Coordinates: 25°47′36″N 80°11′13″W
- Completed: April 2018

Height
- Roof: 535 ft (163 m)

Technical details
- Floor count: 53

Design and construction
- Architect: Arquitectonica
- Developer: Melo Group

Aria on the Bay is a high-rise condominium in the Arts & Entertainment District/Edgewater neighborhood at 1770 North Bayshore Drive, Miami, Florida, U.S.A. Overlooking Margaret Pace Park and Biscayne Bay in Miami's Arts & Entertainment District. It was approved at a height of 535 feet (163 m) in 2015 after an initial notice of presumed hazard by the FAA, who recommended a height of 460 feet. The 52-story building has over 648 units ranging from 813 to 2365 sq ft as well as commercial space. Aria on the Bay was developed by Melo Group and designed by Arquitectonica who handled the architecture, interior design and landscape.

== See also ==
- List of tallest buildings in Miami
- List of tallest buildings in Florida
