= 1800 Club =

Coordinates: 25.794144°N 80.186905°W

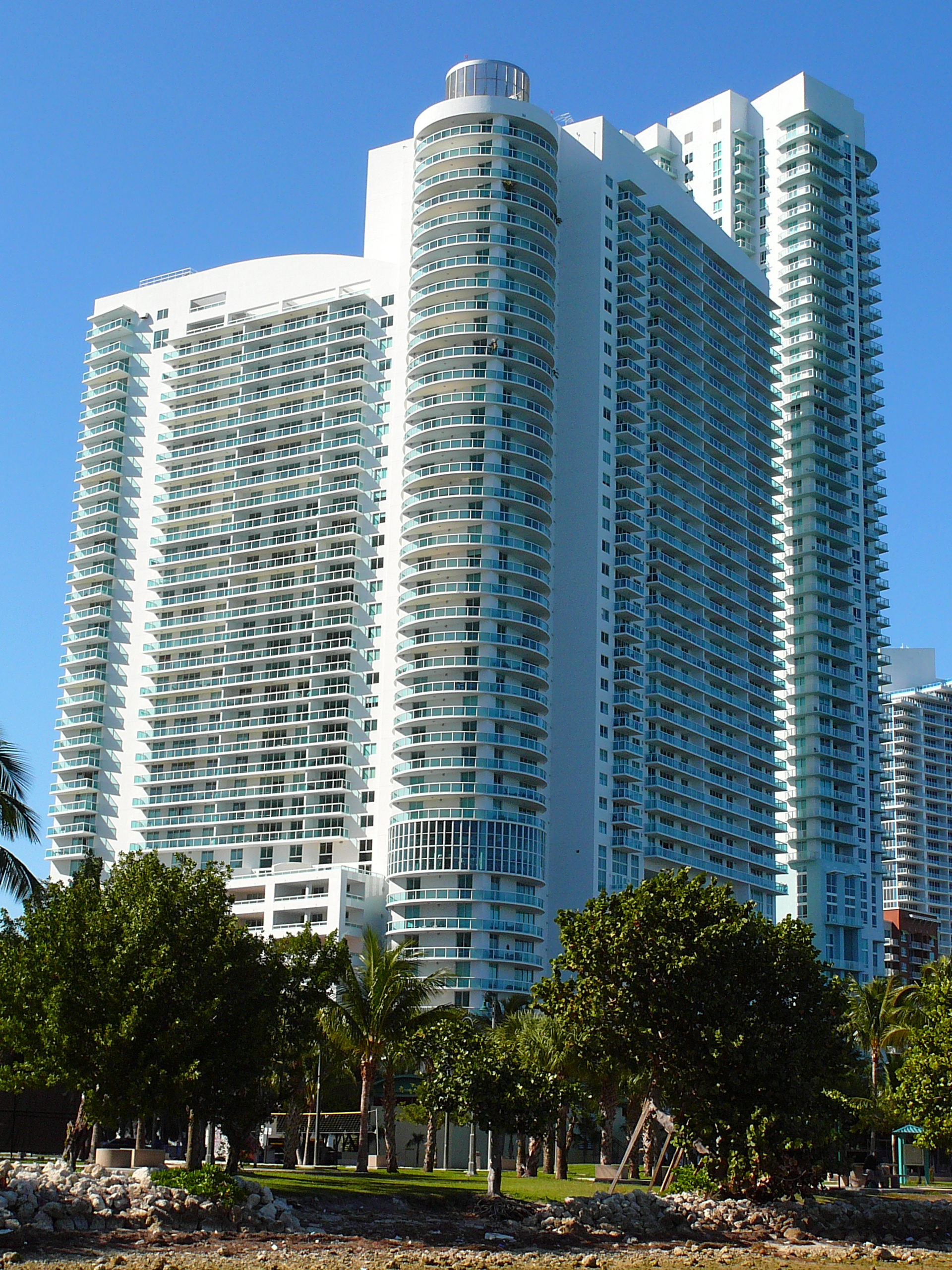
- 1800 Club in February 2009
- Interactive map of the 1800 Club area

General information
- Type: Residential
- Location: 1800 N Bayshore Dr, Miami, Florida, United States
- Construction started: 2003
- Completed: 2007
- Opening: 2007

Height
- Roof: 423 ft (129 m)

Technical details
- Floor count: 40

1800 Club is a residential skyscraper in the Edgewater neighborhood of Miami, Florida, United States. It was completed in 2007. The building is located east of Biscayne Boulevard and fronts Margaret Pace Park and Biscayne Bay. The building is 423 feet (129 m) tall, and contains 40 floors. Floors 1-5 are occupied by retail, while floors 6-40 are residential condominiums and apartments. The building is located at the corner of North Bayshore Drive and Northeast 18th Street. It was awarded the SARA Design Award in 2002 for its exterior architectural appeal.

== Gallery ==
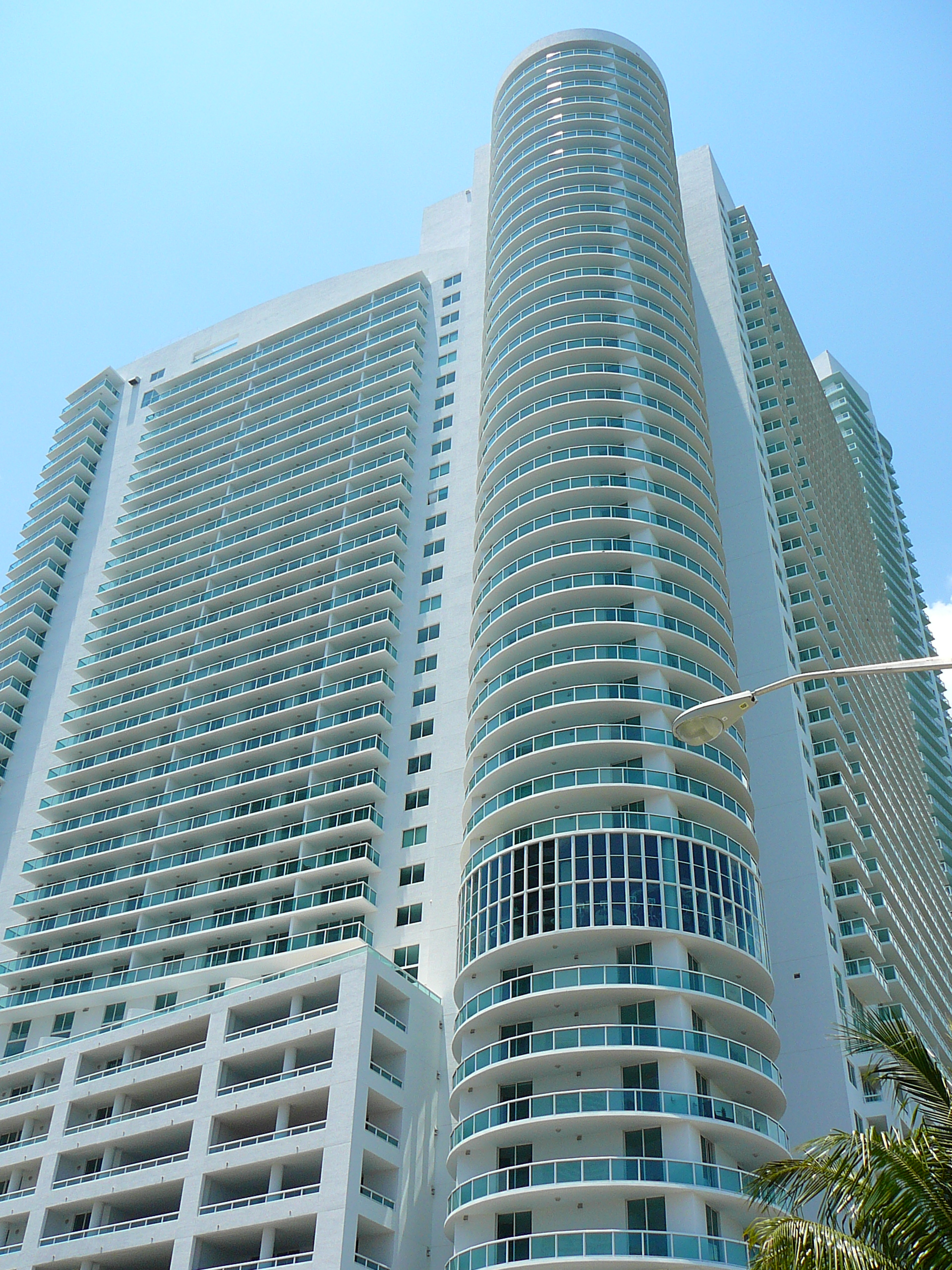
May 2008

== See also ==
- List of tallest buildings in Miami
