= Margaret Pace Park =

Park in Miami, Florida, US

Coordinates: 25.794°N 80.186°W

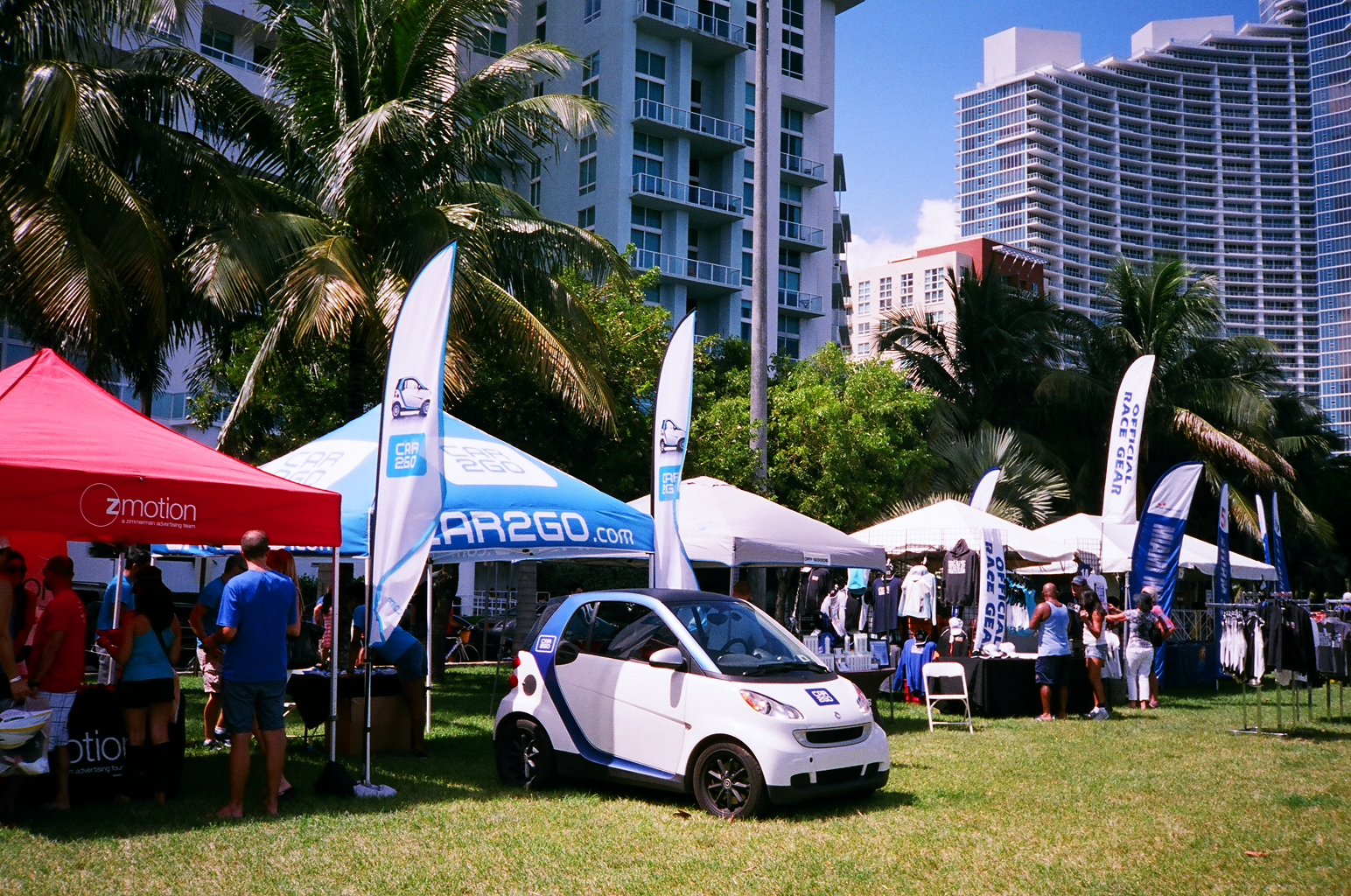
Margaret Pace Park in Miami

Margaret Pace Park is an 8-acre (3.2 ha) urban park located in the Arts & Entertainment District and Edgewater district of Greater Downtown Miami, Florida, U.S.A. The park is located on Biscayne Bay and has tennis courts as well as personal fitness equipment. It was created in the late 1960s and named in honor of Margaret Pace, who was a founder and past president of the Miami Garden Club. Pace was also chairwoman of Royal Palm State Park, which later became part of Everglades National Park, according to the Biscayne Times. A former vice president of the Miami Women’s Club, which is located next door, Pace fought development of the adjoining bayfront green space, which became the park and was named in her honor, according to the Miami Herald. Directly across North Bayshore Drive, several large condominium complexes built in the 2000s housing an economic bubble overlook the park:

- Opera Tower, located at 1750 Bayshore Drive, built in 2008. More details.
- Bay Parc, located at 1756 Bayshore Drive, built in 2000. More details.
- Aria on the Bay, located at 488 NE 18th St, built in 2018. More details.
- 1800 Club Condo, located at 1800 Bayshore Dr, built in 2007. More details.
- Quantum on the Bay, located at 1900 Bayshore Dr, built in 2007. More details.

The park underwent a $4 million renovation during this time. An even larger building, Aria on the Bay, is under construction adjacent to the park As of 2015. The historic Miami Women's Club building is located directly to the south of the park.
