= Midtown Miami Residences =

- Interactive map of the Midtown Miami Residences area

General information
- Coordinates: 25°48′30″N 80°11′32″W

Midtown Miami Residences consists of three residential towers located in Midtown Miami.

The buildings are located on Northeast 1st Avenue between Northwest 32nd Street and Northwest 35th Street, on the site of the former Buena Vista rail yard. Gold Krown Financial purchased a total of 538 units from a group of lenders represented by HSBC for approximately $110 million in 2012. Midblock consists of nine stories and 173 units. According to CityBizList, the building was originally planned as a condominium but was converted to rentals as a result of the 2008 economic downturn. Construction on Midblock was completed in 2008 and beginning in 2011 Beztak Companies managed the rental program. Tenant occupancy was consistently more than 90 percent. Gold Krown Financial converted Midblock from a rental building back to a condominium in August 2013.

4 Midtown is a 33-story tower with 304 units, ranging from 638 square feet to 1,842 square feet with penthouses up to 3,557 square feet. Gold Krown hired RS3 Designs to renovate the lobby, rooftop pool deck and fitness center in 2012. More than 70 percent of buyers purchasing units in 4 Midtown were Florida locals. In 2013, Gold Krown Financial offered 97 percent financing through a loan program aimed at emerging neighborhoods.

2 Midtown is a 29-story tower with 337 units, ranging from 493 square feet to 5,070 square feet with penthouses up to 3,990 square feet. 2 Midtown was designed by Zyscovich Architects.
