= Midtown Miami =

Neighborhood in Miami, Florida

Coordinates: 25°48′26.29″N 80°11′35.68″W

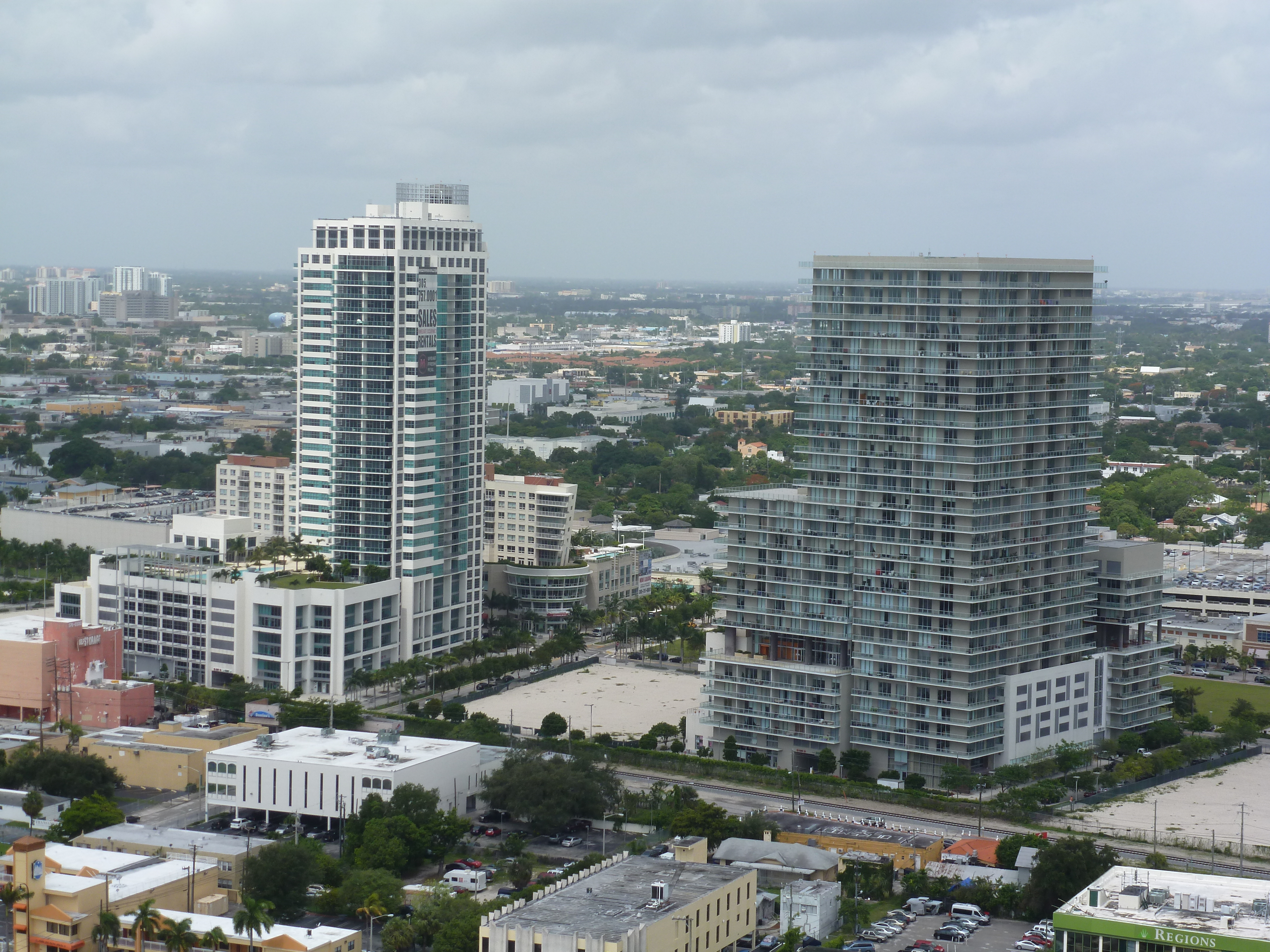
Midtown Miami, June 2012

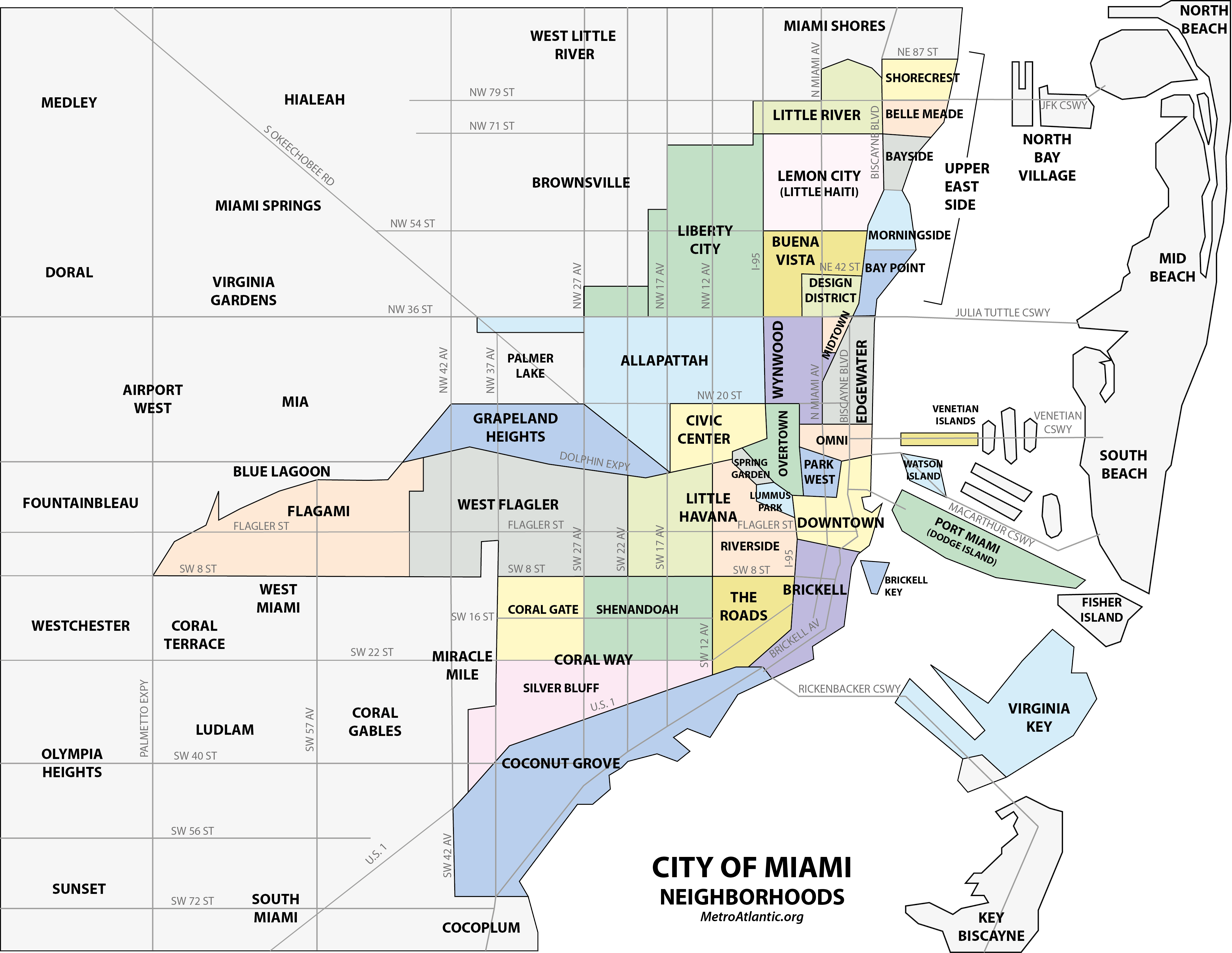
Midtown is a small sub-district cut out of Edgewater and Wynwood, within the City of Miami

Midtown Miami is the collective term for the Wynwood and Edgewater neighborhoods of Miami, Florida. It is located north of Downtown and south of the Miami Design District and is roughly bound by North 20th Street to the south, I-195 to the north, I-95 to the west, and Biscayne Bay to the east.

In 2005, construction began on the "Midtown Miami" development between North 29th and 36th Street and Miami Avenue and the Florida East Coast Railway (FEC) on what was historically an FEC rail yard. The project is a large-scale, urban development that was planned with 8 high-rise residential buildings, a hotel, two parks, and a major urban shopping area, "The Shops at Midtown". Due to the collapse of the real estate bubble in 2007, only two residential buildings, and about 2/3 of "The Shops at Midtown" were built. In July 2011, plans were announced to begin construction on a new entertainment center at Midtown, including a hotel, and shops on the site of the current temporary park in the center of Midtown. Critics of Midtown state the lack of parks as a major issue.

== History ==
Midtown has grown quickly, and is home to Shops at Midtown, an outdoor shopping area designed to mimic New York's SOHO neighborhood, and home to many national and local stores and restaurants and an abundance of upscale apartments. A fair amount of office businesses have also taken up residence in Midtown in office buildings, in industries ranging from interior decor to marketing agency services, and more. At Büro Urbano urban workspace, office spaces are provided for small businesses. Midtown has also become home to Art Miami art fair, which takes place during Miami's Art Basel week.

On 1 August 2016, the Centers for Disease Control and Prevention issued a travel warning, advising pregnant women not to visit Midtown Miami, the Design District and Wynwood areas to avoid getting the Zika virus. Zika warnings in Miami have been lifted by end of 2016.

== Economy ==
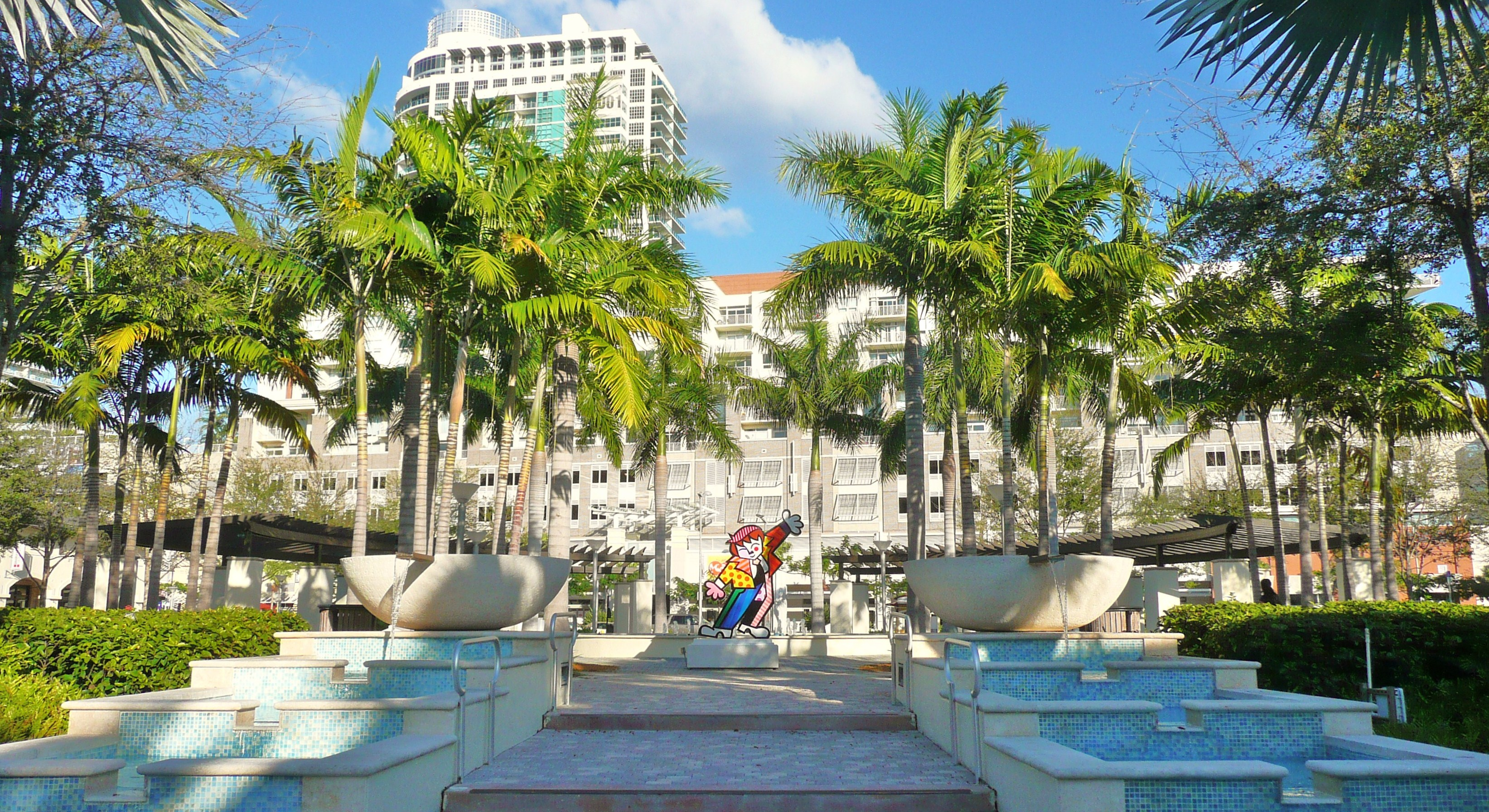
Promenade within the Shops at Midtown Miami, February 2011

Bacardi's United States headquarters were located in the Bacardi buildings also near Midtown Miami. By 2007 Bacardi USA agreed to lease a complex in Coral Gables to use as its new headquarters. At that time, Bacardi had employees in seven buildings across South Florida. Bacardi vacated its former headquarter buildings. Miami citizens began a campaign to label the buildings as historic. Allan T. Schulman, a professor of architecture at the University of Miami, said "Miami's brand is its identity as a tropical city. The Bacardi buildings are exactly the sort that resonate with our consciousness of what Miami is about." In 2007 Chad Oppenheim, the head of Oppenheim Architecture + Design, described the Bacardi buildings as "elegant, with a Modernist [look combined with] a local flavor." In late 2012, the National YoungArts Foundation purchased the storied Bacardi buildings and has converted them into their national headquarters.

== Residences ==
- Midtown Miami Residences

== Gallery ==
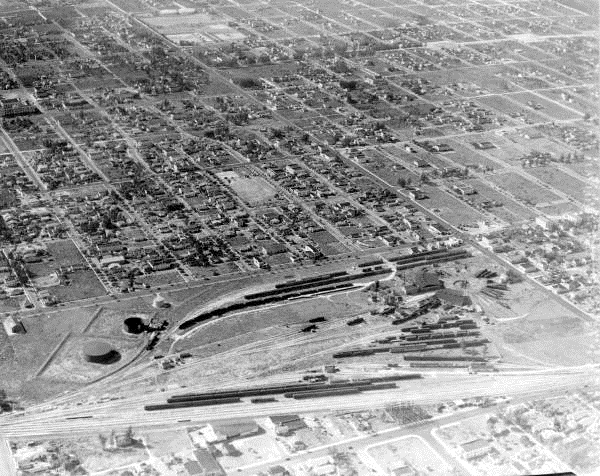
Northwestward aerial of FEC Buena Vista yard in 1928, now Midtown Miami

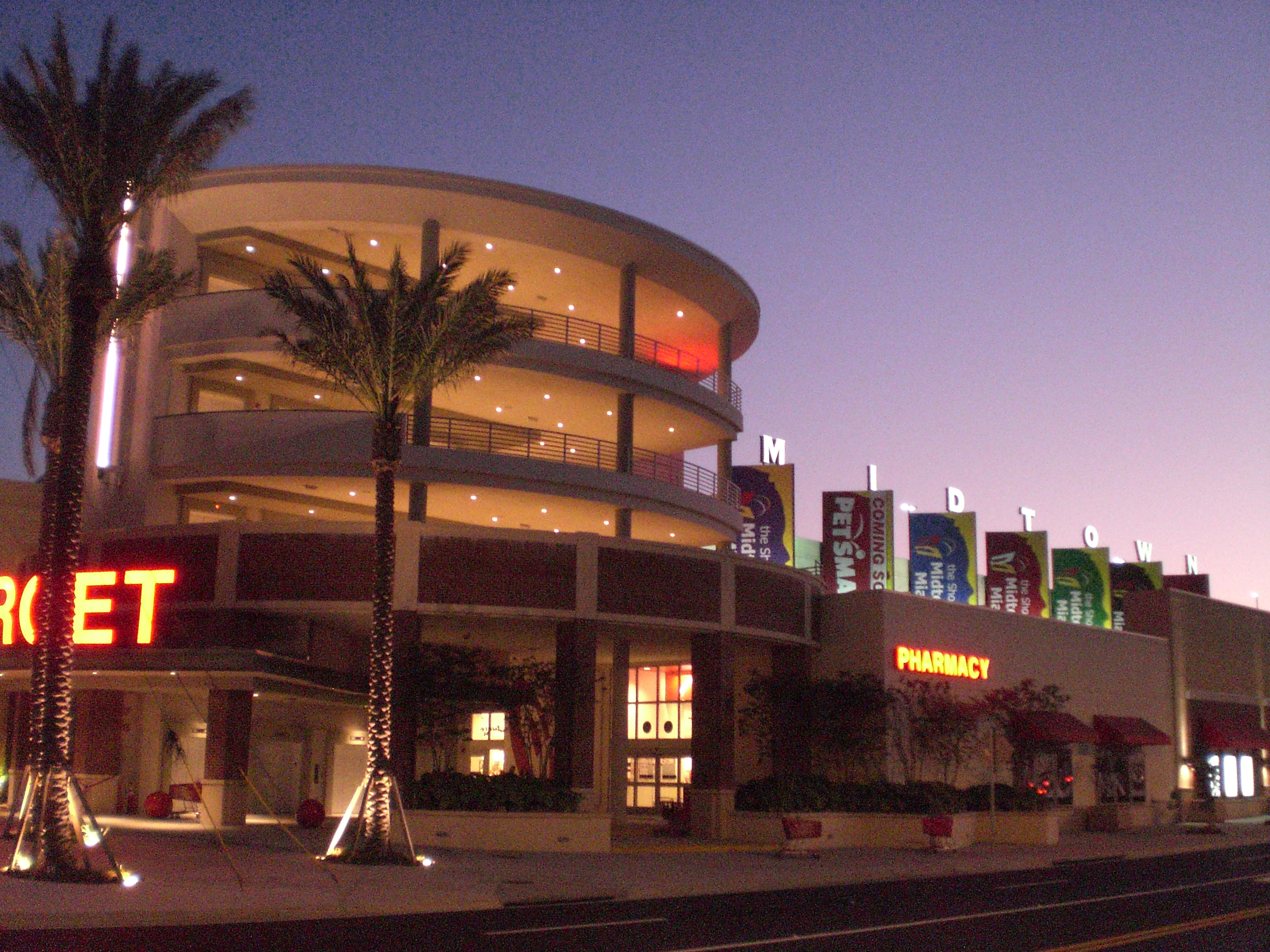
Shops at Midtown

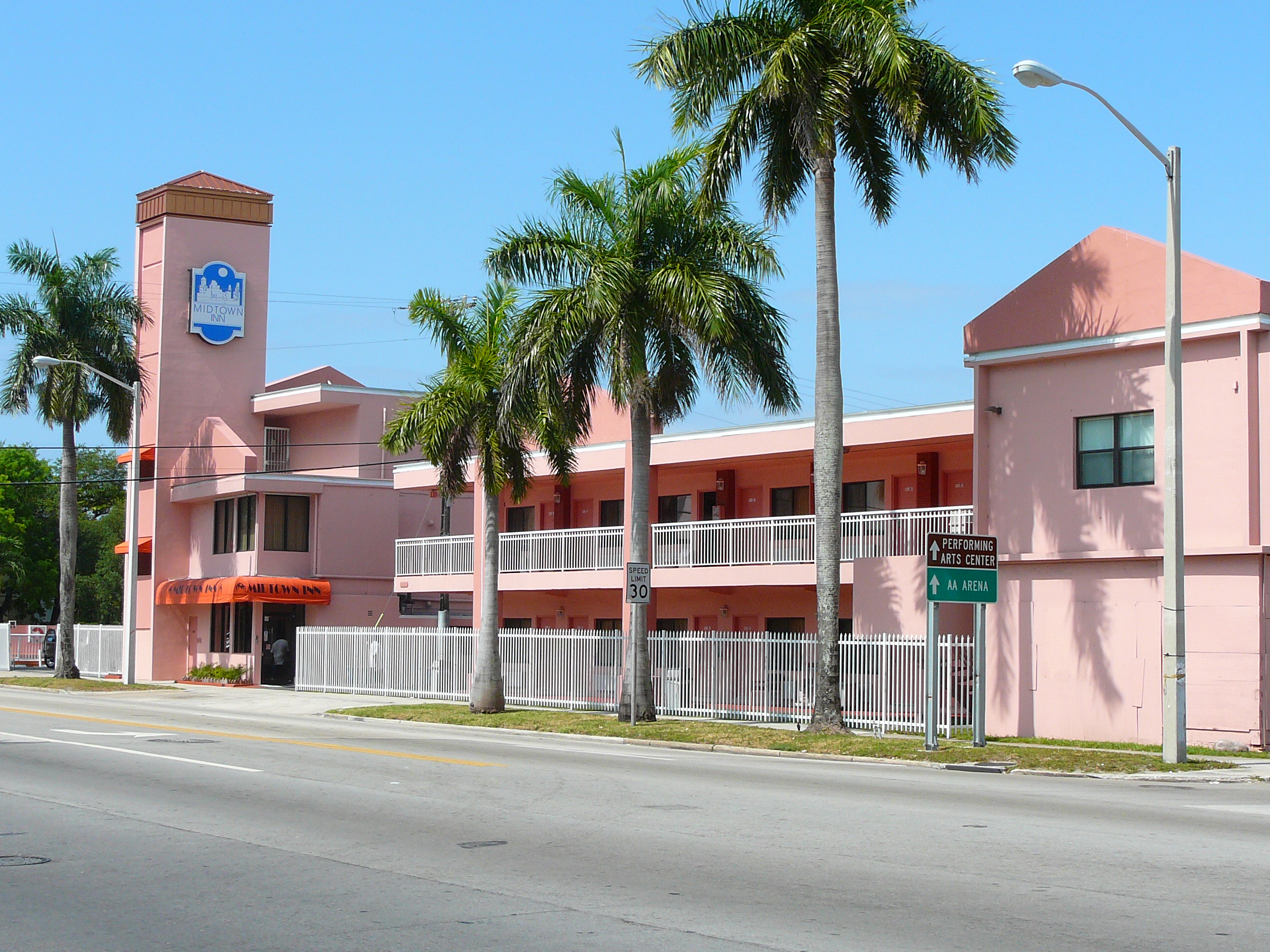
Businesses such as Midtown Inn have altered their names to reflect the new "Midtown Miami" development

== See also ==
- Arts & Entertainment District
- Downtown Miami
- Midtown Interchange
- Miami Design District
- Wynwood
