= Paramount Bay at Edgewater Square =

Paramount Bay
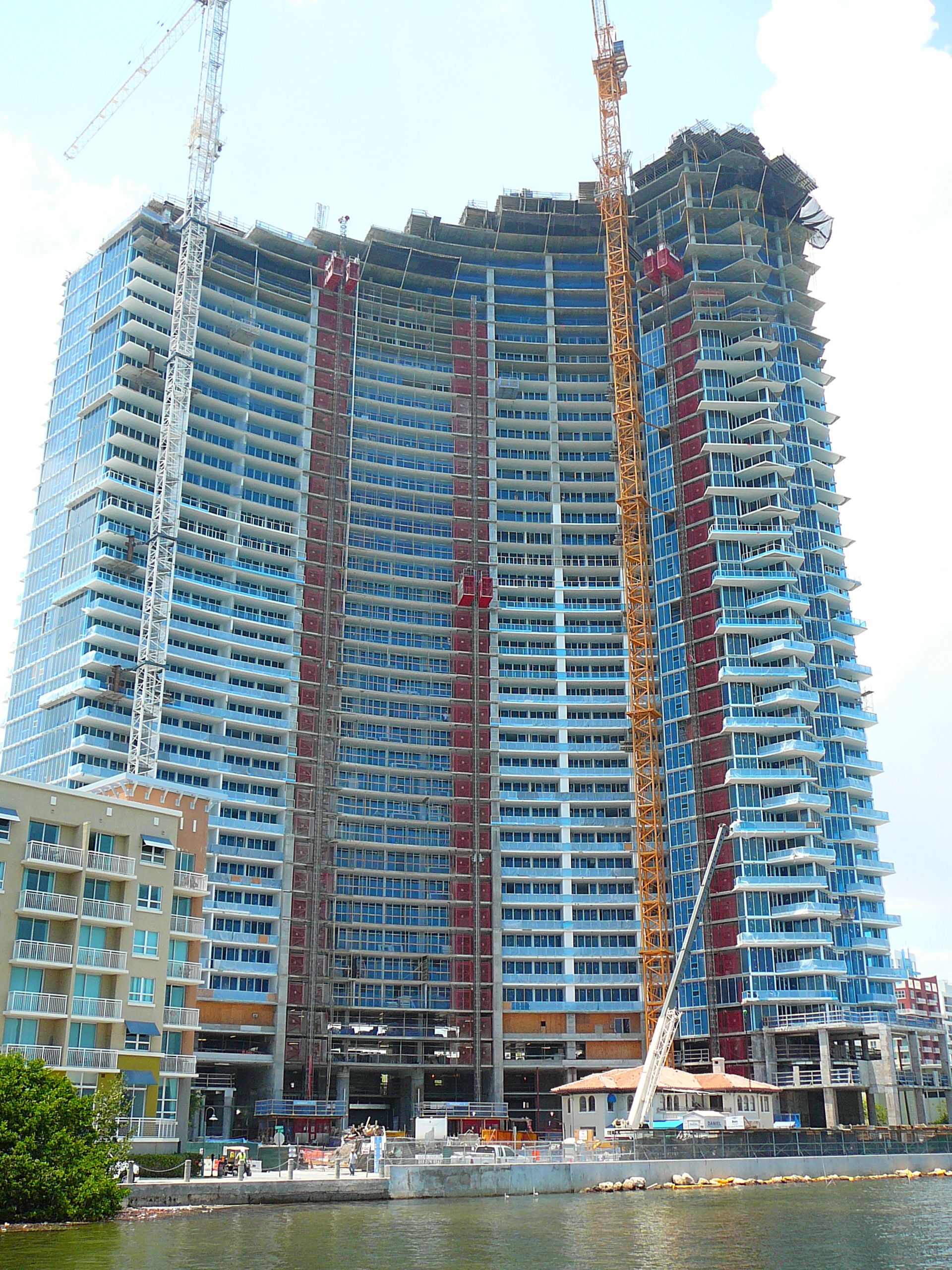
- Paramount Bay under construction in May 2008
- Interactive map of the Paramount Bay area

General information
- Status: Completed
- Type: Residential
- Location: 2066 N Bayshore Dr, Miami, Florida, United States
- Coordinates: 25.796729°N 80.187675°W
- Construction started: 2006
- Completed: 2009
- Opening: 2009

Height
- Roof: 554.92 ft (169.14 m)

Technical details
- Floor count: 47

Paramount Bay is a luxury high-rise condominium building in the Edgewater Neighborhood, adjacent to the Arts & Entertainment District of Miami, Florida, United States. It stands 554.92 feet (169.14 m), with 47 floors. The building was topped off in late 2009. It was designed by the Arquitectonica architectural firm, with creative vision by Lenny Kravitz for Kravitz Design Inc. I-Star Financial and ST Residential have taken control of the project and are reinventing the property to bring to market in the second quarter of 2011. Fortune International is the current asset manager and Fortune Development Sales has been retained for Sales and Marketing.

== See also ==
- List of tallest buildings in Miami
