= Edgewater (Miami) =

- Neighborhood of Miami
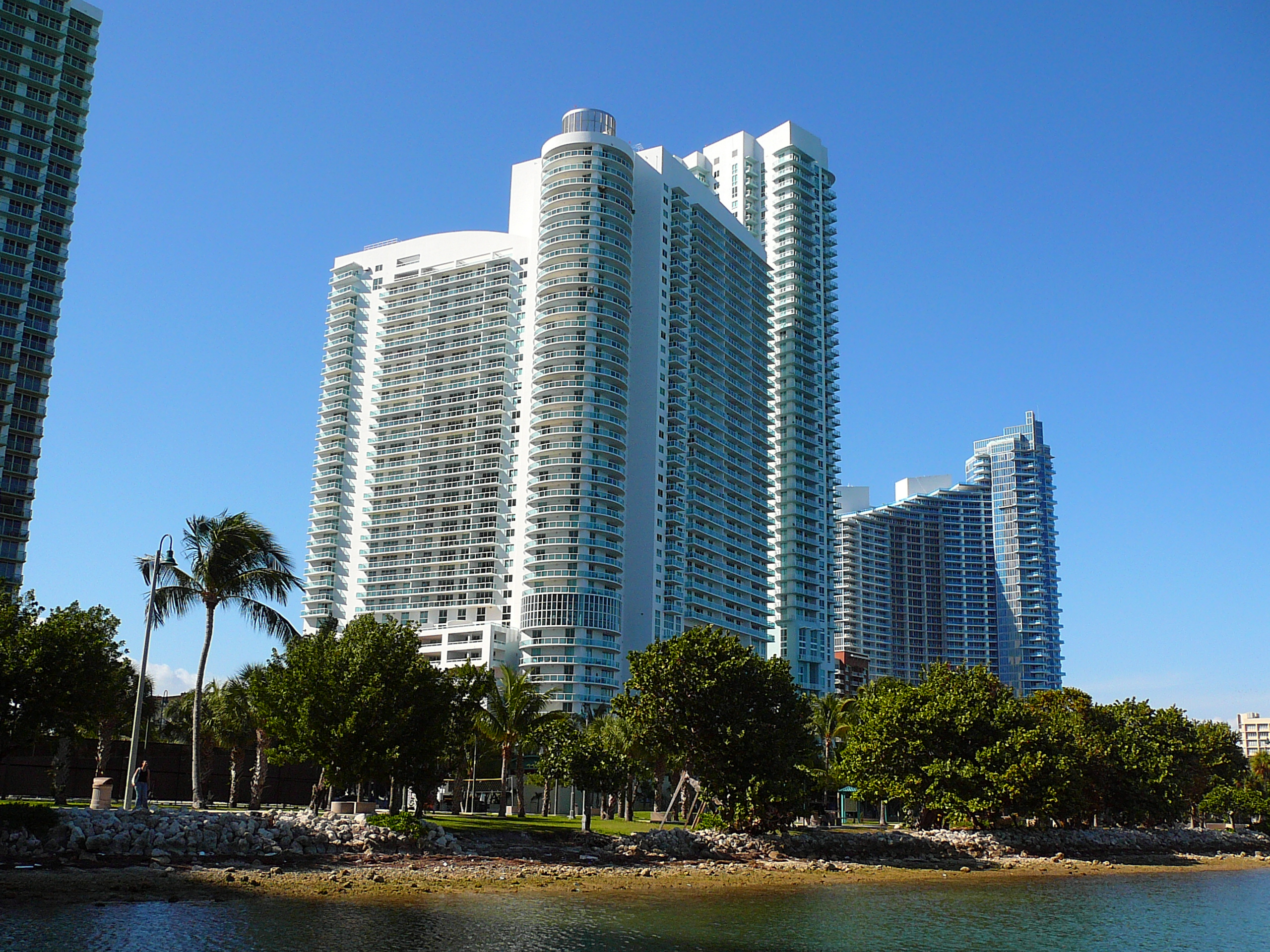
- The southern end of Edgewater, showing the new developments 1800 Club (center) and Paramount Bay at Edgewater Square (right).

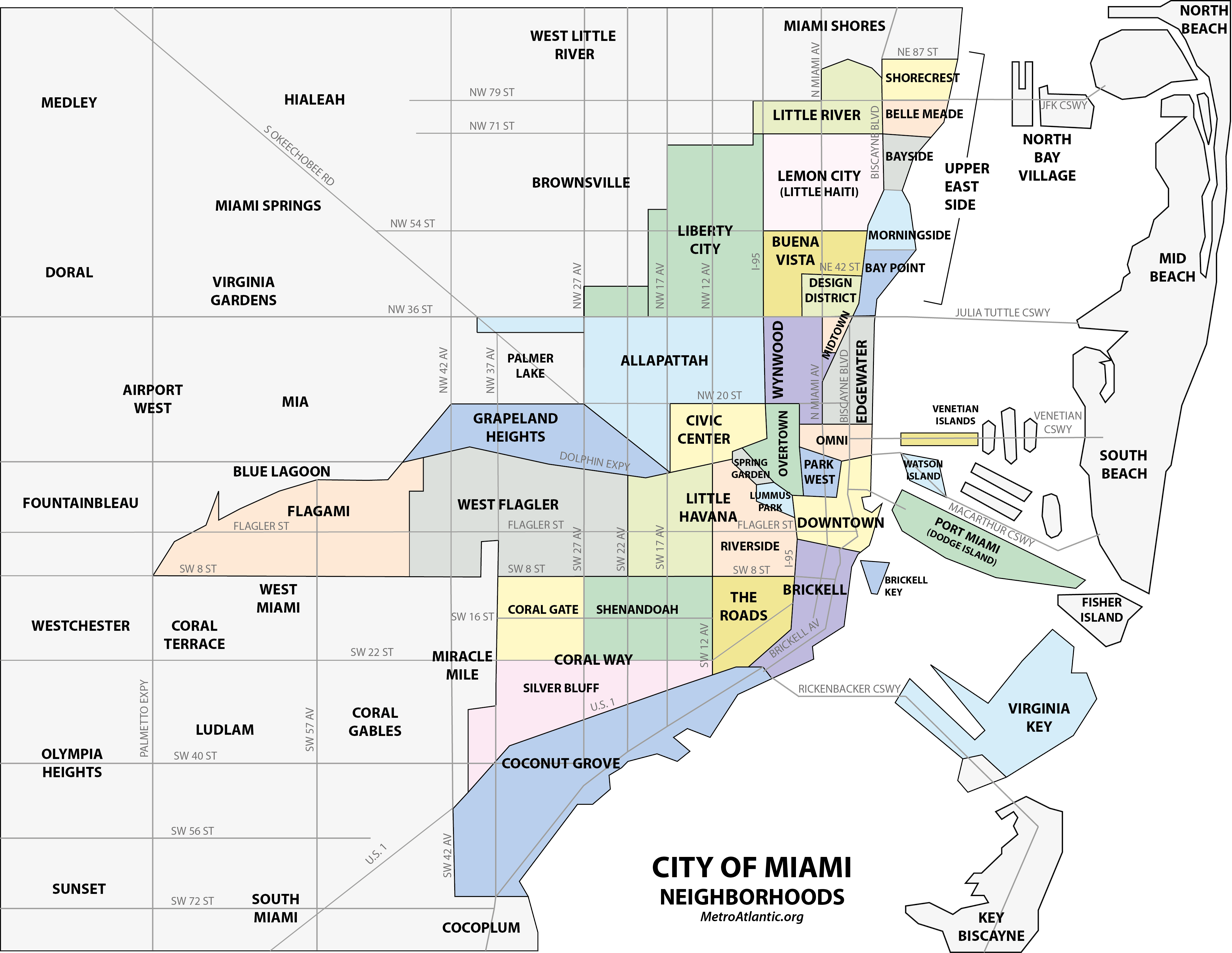
- Edgewater neighborhood within the City of Miami
- Coordinates: 25°48′8″N 80°11′24″W
- Country: United States
- State: Florida
- County: Miami-Dade County
- City: Miami

Government
  - City of Miami Commissioner: Sabina Covo
  - Miami-Dade Commissioners: Keon Hardemon
  - House of Representatives: Vicki Lopez (R)
  - State Senate: Ileana Garcia (R)
  - U.S. House: Maria Elvira Salazar (R)

Area
  - Total: 1.679 sq mi (4.35 km^{2})

Population (2010)
  - Total: 15,005
  - Density: 17,289/sq mi (6,675/km^{2})
- Time zone: UTC-05 (EST)
- ZIP Code: 33137, 33132
- Area codes: 305, 786
- Website: Edgewater neighborhood

Edgewater is a neighborhood in Miami, Florida, located north of Downtown and the Arts & Entertainment District, and south of Midtown and the Upper Eastside. It is roughly bound by North 17th Street to the south, North 37th Street to the north, the Florida East Coast Railway and East First Avenue to the west and Biscayne Bay to the east.

Edgewater is primarily a residential neighborhood, with many historic early 20th century homes. The neighborhood has many high-rise residential towers to the east along Biscayne Bay, and historic homes elsewhere in the neighborhood. Since 2000, the area has grown in popularity, due to its proximity to Downtown and neighborhoods such as the Design District. Recent developments in the neighborhood have brought rapid urbanization to the area, with the construction of high-rise and mid-rise residential buildings, and more retail.

== Demographics ==
Historical population
Census	Pop.	Note	%±
2000	14,819		—
2010	21,826		47.3%

As of 2000, Edgewater (Wynwood) had a population between 14,034 and 14,819 residents, with 6,221 households, and 2,987 families residing in the neighborhood. The median household income was $11,293.93. The racial makeup of the neighborhood was 58.51% Hispanic or Latino of any race, 17.51% Black or African American, 21.55% White (non-Hispanic), and 2.42% Other races (non-Hispanic). It shares demographics with Wynwood.

The ZIP codes for the Edgewater (Wynwood) include 33127, 33132, and 33137. The area covers 1.679 square miles (4.35 km^{2}). As of 2000, there were 7,548 males and 6,486 females. The median age for males was 32.5 years old, while the median age for females was 32.3 years old. The average household size had 2.3 people, while the average family size was 3.2 members. The percentage of married-couple families (among all households) was 25.2%, while the percentage of married-couple families with children (among all households) was 10.9%, and the percentage of single-mother households (among all households) was 11.6%. 4.5% of the population was in other group homes. The percentage of never-married males 15 years old and over was 20.1%, while the percentage of never-married females 15 years old and over was 15.9%.

As of 2000, the percentage of people that speak English not well or not at all made up 25.1% of the population. The percentage of residents born in Florida was 28.0%, the percentage of people born in another U.S. state was 20.5%, and the percentage of native residents but born outside the U.S. was 7.0%, while the percentage of foreign born residents was 44.4%

== Parks and Recreation ==
Margaret Pace Park, located along Biscayne Bay, is a key recreational area in Edgewater. It includes sports courts, picnic areas, running paths, outdoor gyms, and playgrounds. The park is frequently used by residents for activities such as yoga, cycling, and family outings. The Baywalk is a pedestrian and bicycle path along Biscayne Bay that, once completed, will connect several waterfront neighborhoods. It aims to enhance public access to the bay and promote non-motorized transportation.

== Gallery ==
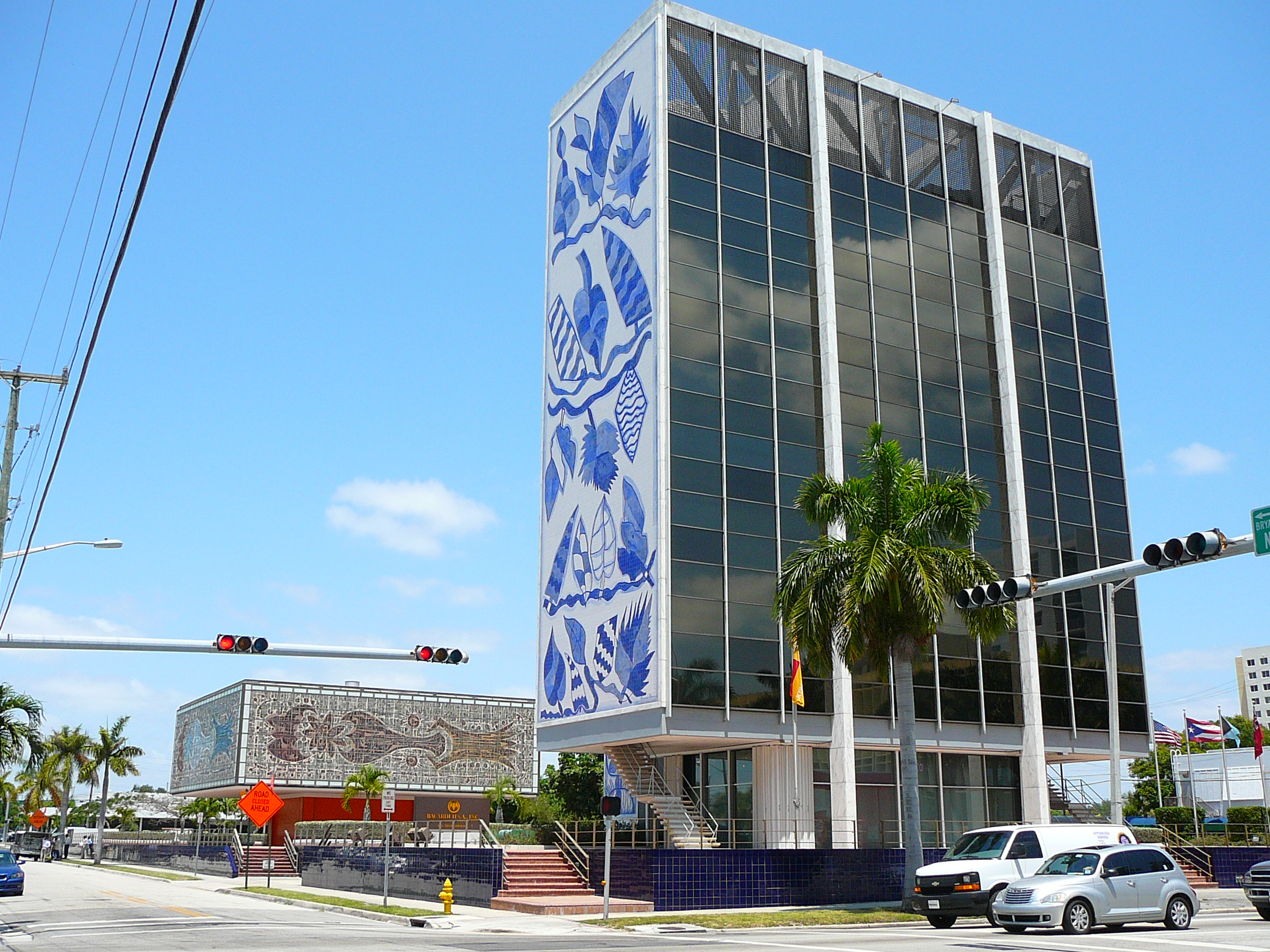
The Bacardi Building on NE 21 St and Biscayne Blvd, is a landmark building in Edgewater, built in the MiMo style

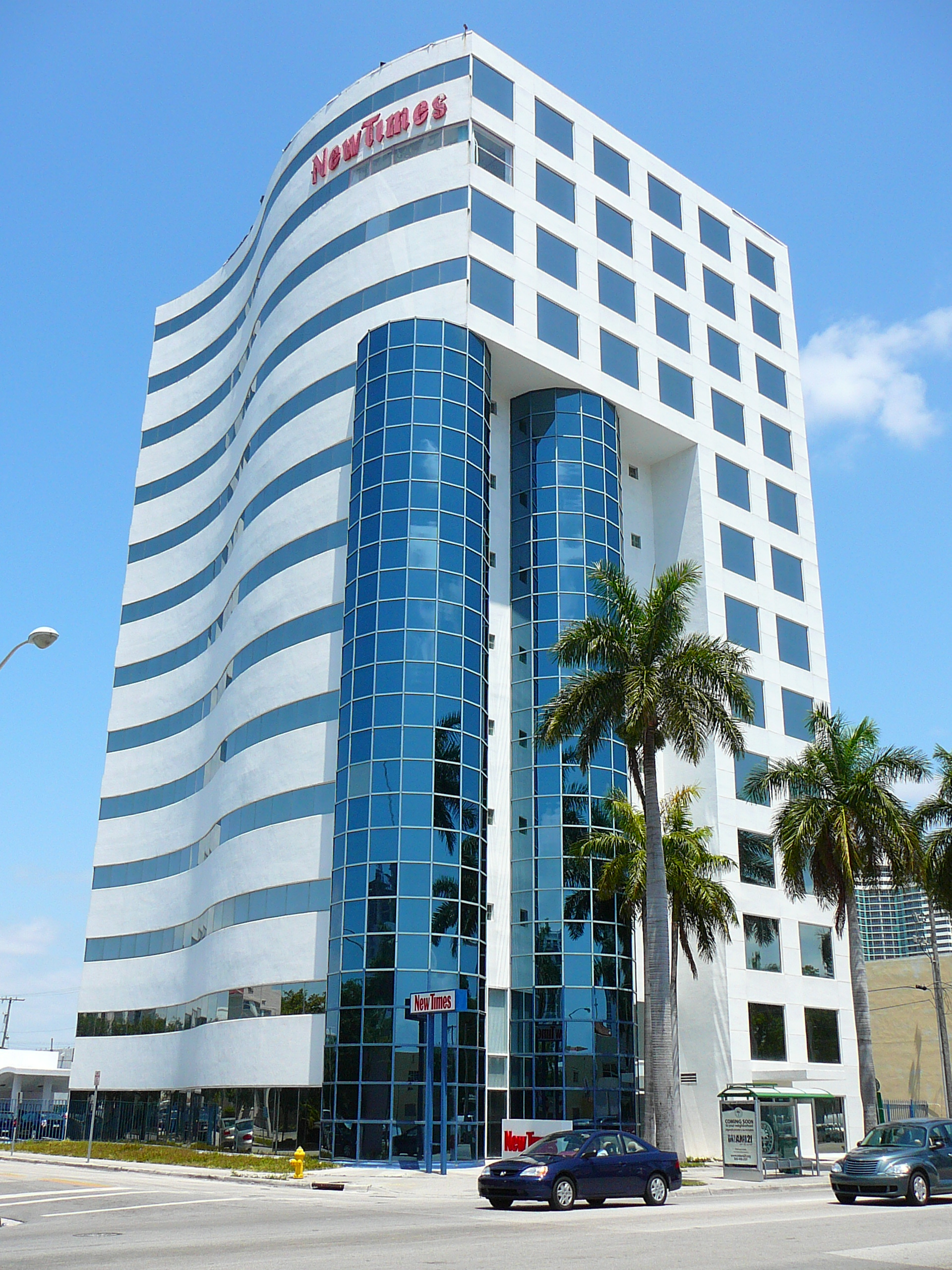
The Miami New Times headquarters

== See also ==
- Paramount Bay at Edgewater Square
- 1800 Club
- Blue on the Bay
- Wynwood
