= The Grand Doubletree =

DoubleTree by Hilton Grand Hotel Biscayne Bay
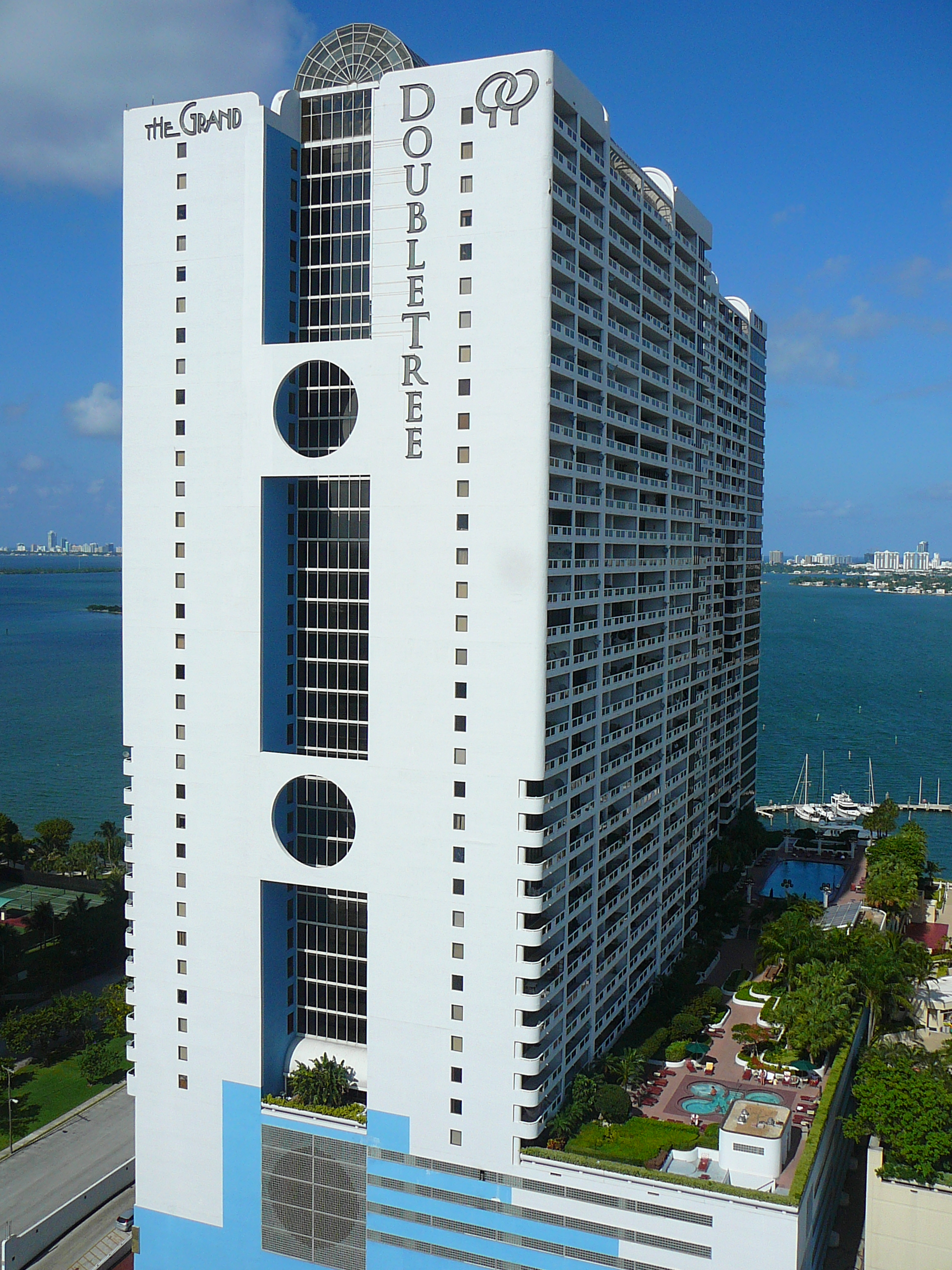
- The Grand DoubleTree in Downtown Miami in May 2008
- Interactive map of the DoubleTree by Hilton Grand Hotel Biscayne Bay area

General information
- Type: Residential and Hotel
- Location: 1717 North Bayshore Drive, Miami, Florida, United States
- Coordinates: 25.791507°N 80.186232°W
- Completed: 1986
- Opening: 1986

Height
- Roof: 365 ft (111 m)

Technical details
- Floor count: 42

Design and construction
- Architects: Toombs, Amisano and Wells

The DoubleTree by Hilton Grand Hotel Biscayne Bay, also referred as The Grand or The Grand DoubleTree, is a high-rise on the north side of Downtown Miami, Florida, United States. It lies within the Arts & Entertainment District. It was completed in 1986 and designed by the Atlanta architectural firm of Toombs, Amisano and Wells. It is a condominium and hotel. Floors 3–9 are hotel rooms. Floors 10–42 contain over 830 condominium units. The hotel portion contains 152 rooms, and was renovated in 2004. The building is very large, with almost 3.5 million square feet (325,161 m^{2}) of floor space, though this likely includes a large parking garage across the street that is shared with the Omni complex.

It is a full-service building, meaning it contains offices, a grocery store, convenience store, deli, clothing stores, gift shops, jewelry stores, pet store, pharmacy, bank, car rental office, doctor, dentist, beauty salon, barbershop, liquor store, dry cleaner, four restaurants, full-time concierge, valet, day spa, fitness center, pool, hot tubs, banquet halls and a full-service marina.

It is located one block north of the Adrienne Arsht Metromover station, and two blocks northeast of Miami's performing arts center. It is directly east of, and connected by skywalk to the Omni International Mall. Its backyard is the Sea Isle Marina, home to the Miami International Boat Show.

The condominium floors of the building have two large atriums on the east and west side.

== Restaurants on site ==
- Tony Chan's Water Club
- Primo's Restaurant & Lounge
- Los Gauchitos Steakhouse
- Casablanca Sea Food

== Gallery ==
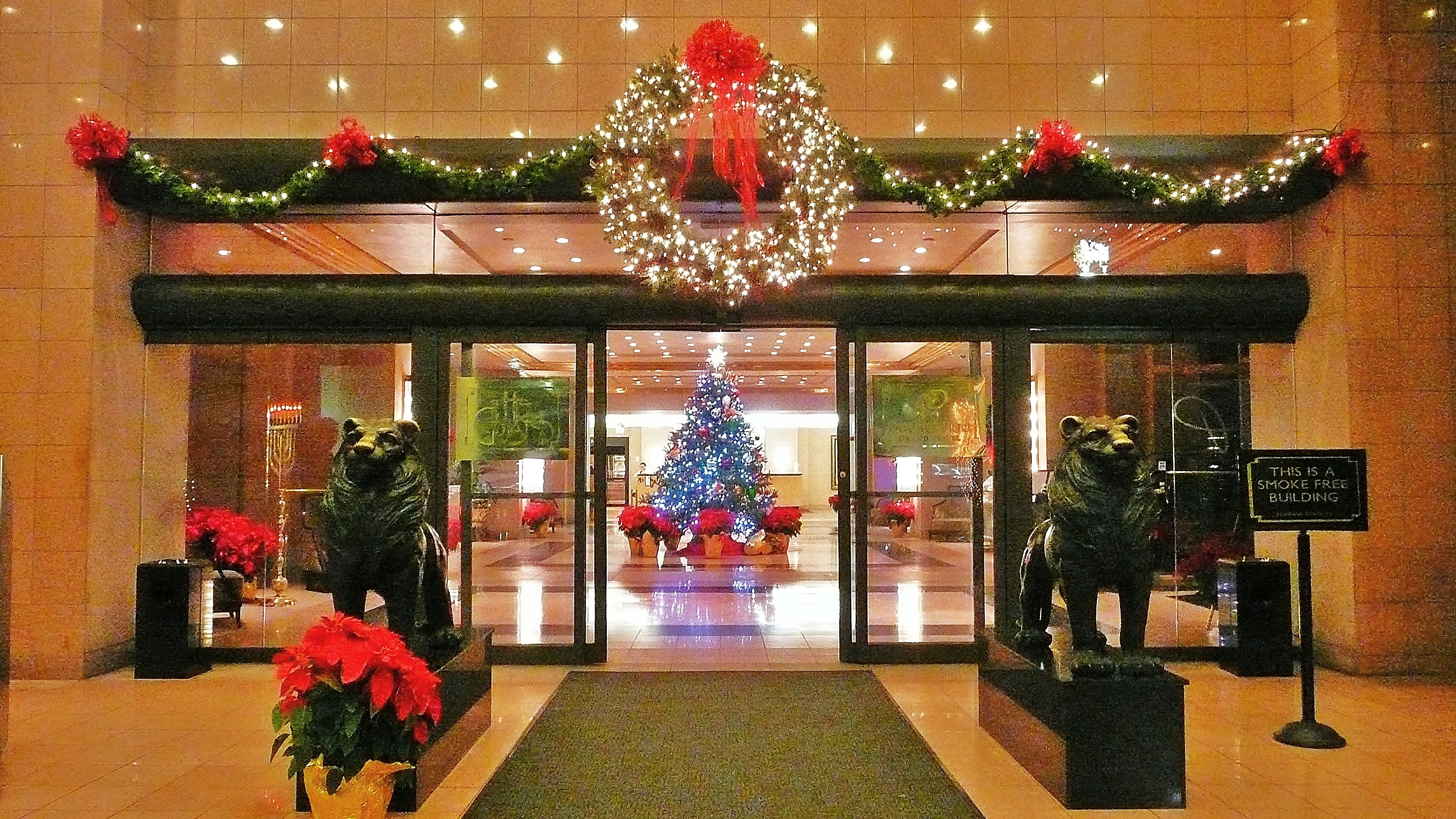
Entrance to the Grand during Christmas and holiday season 2010

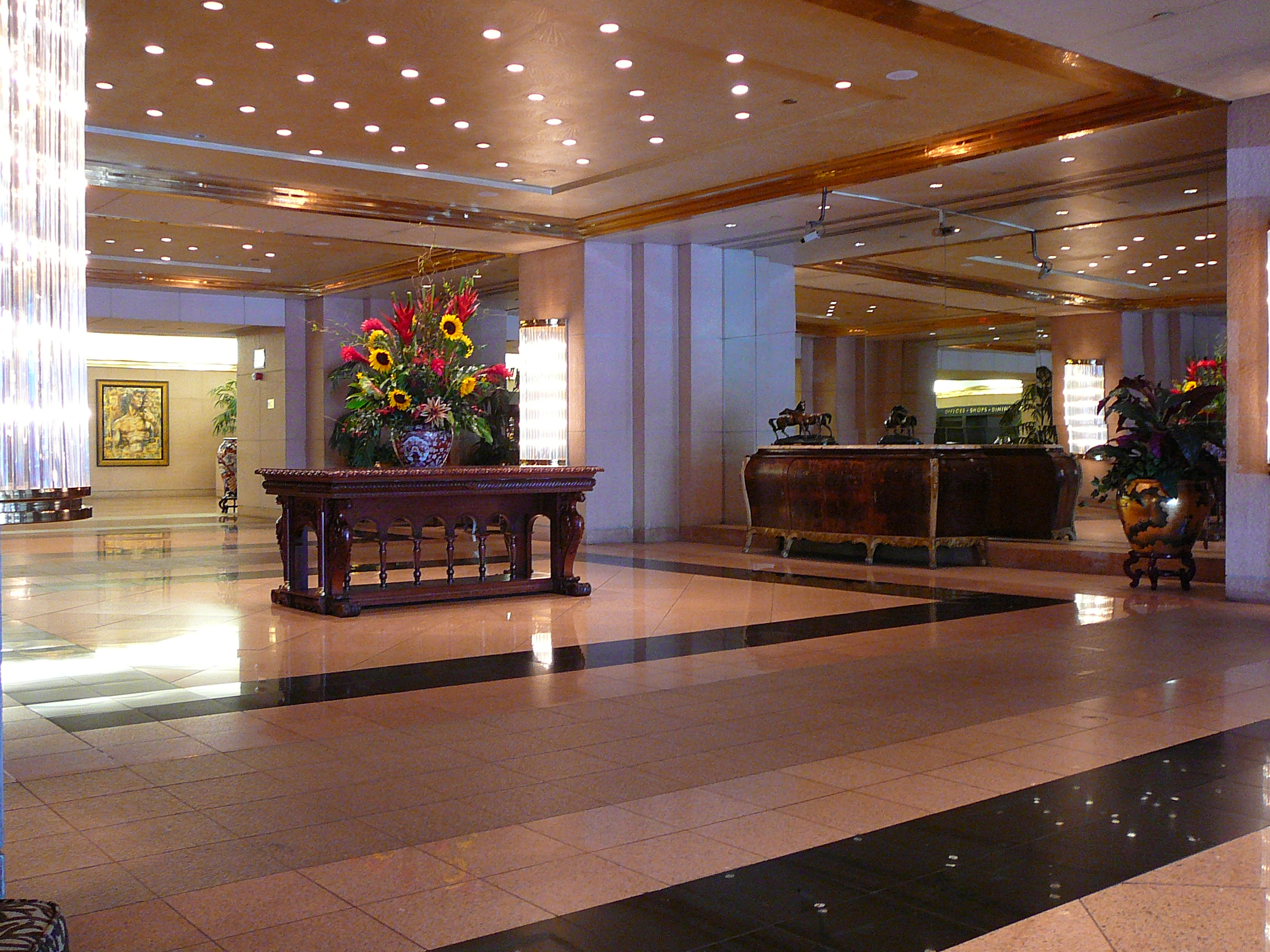
The lobby of the Grand

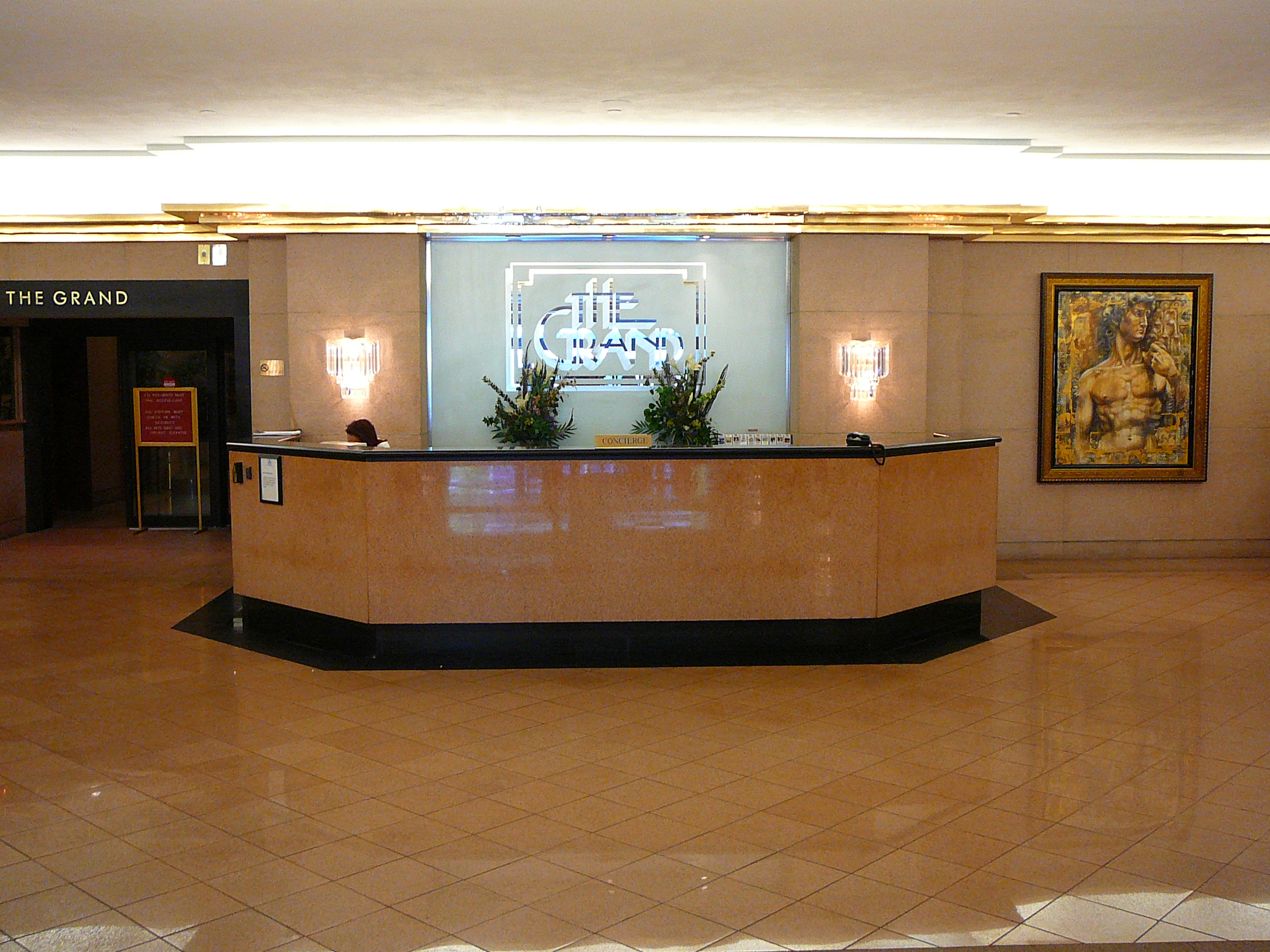
Concierge desk

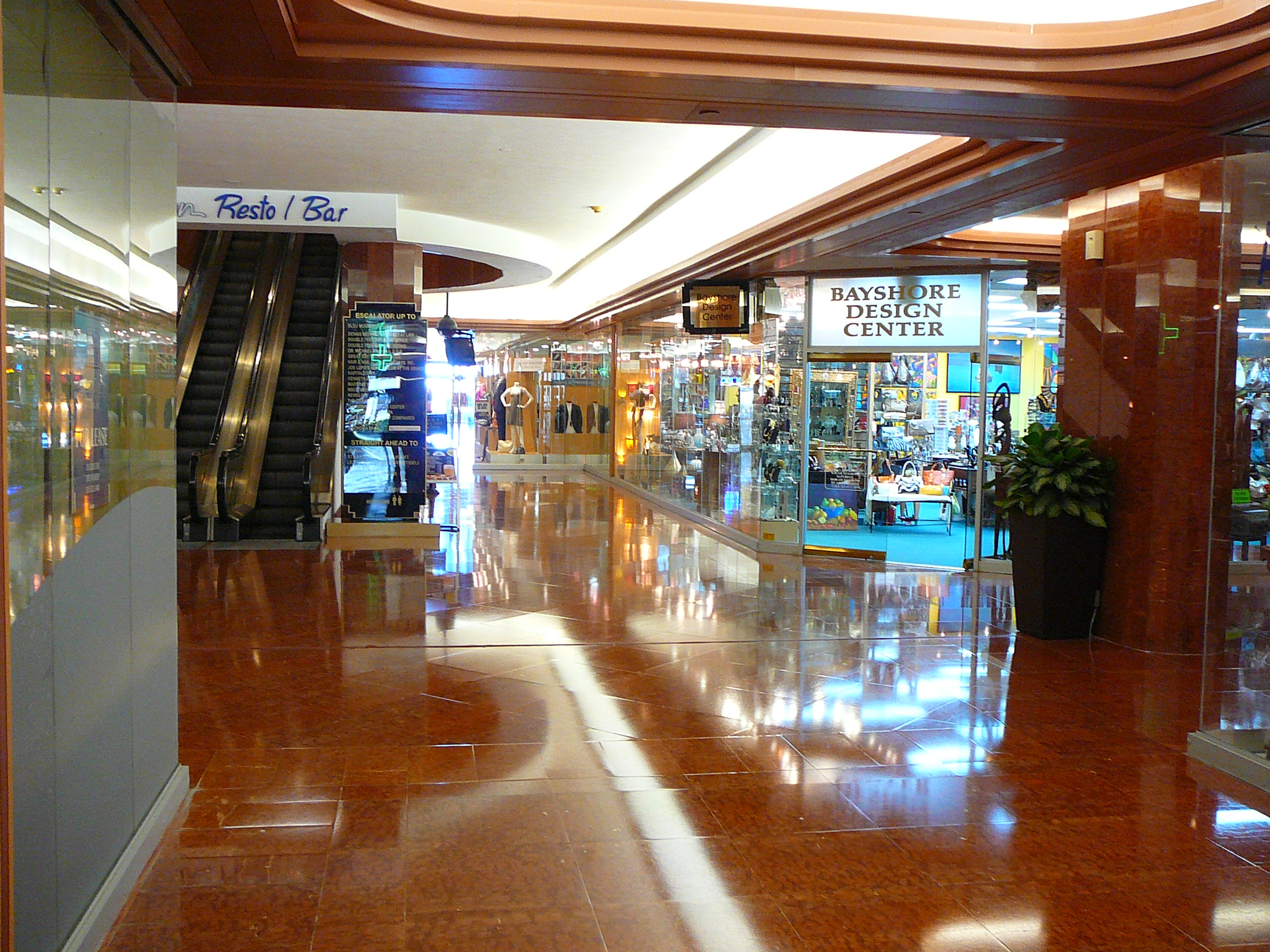
Portion of the shopping mall (1st level)

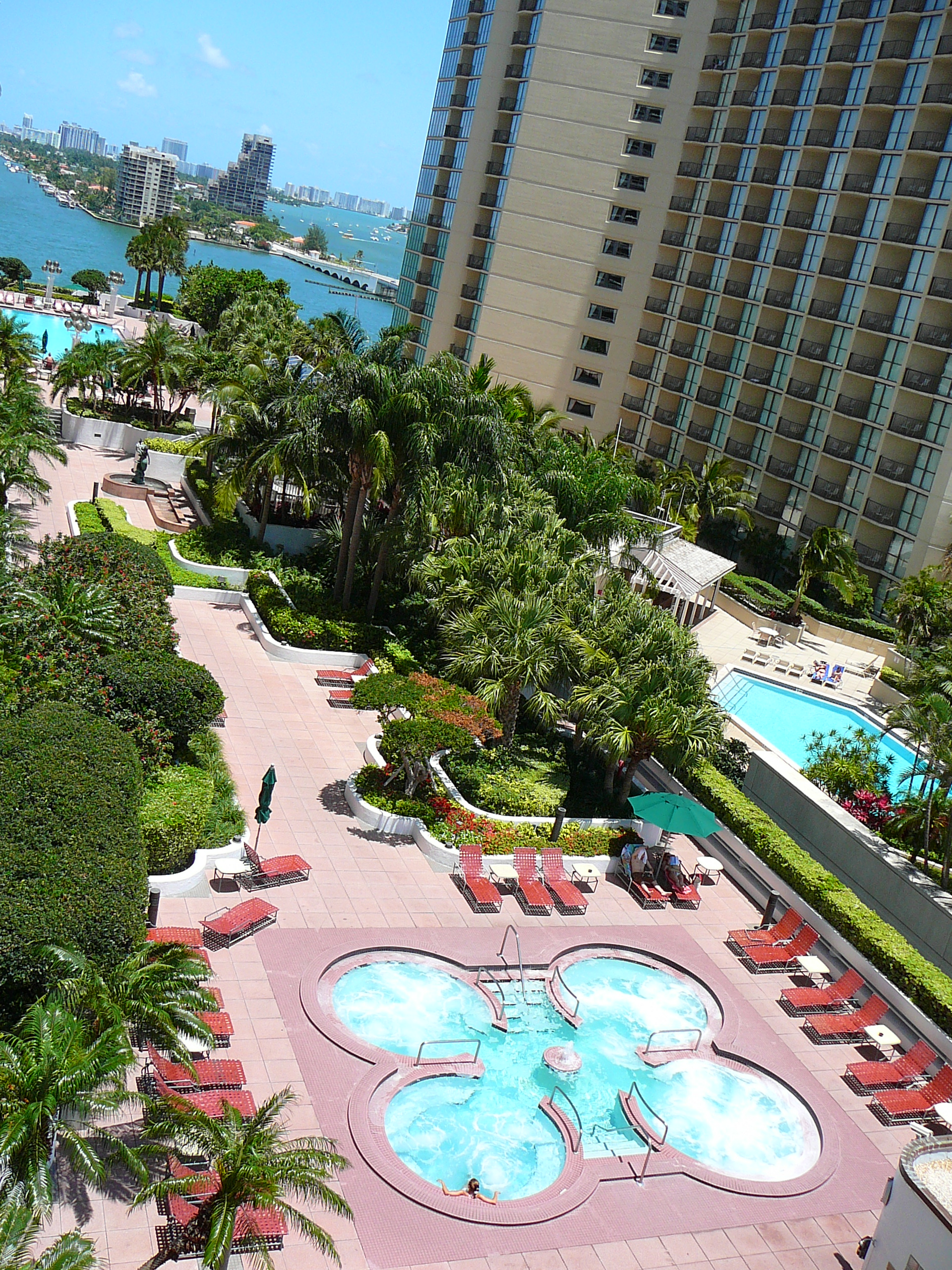
The 10th floor pool deck

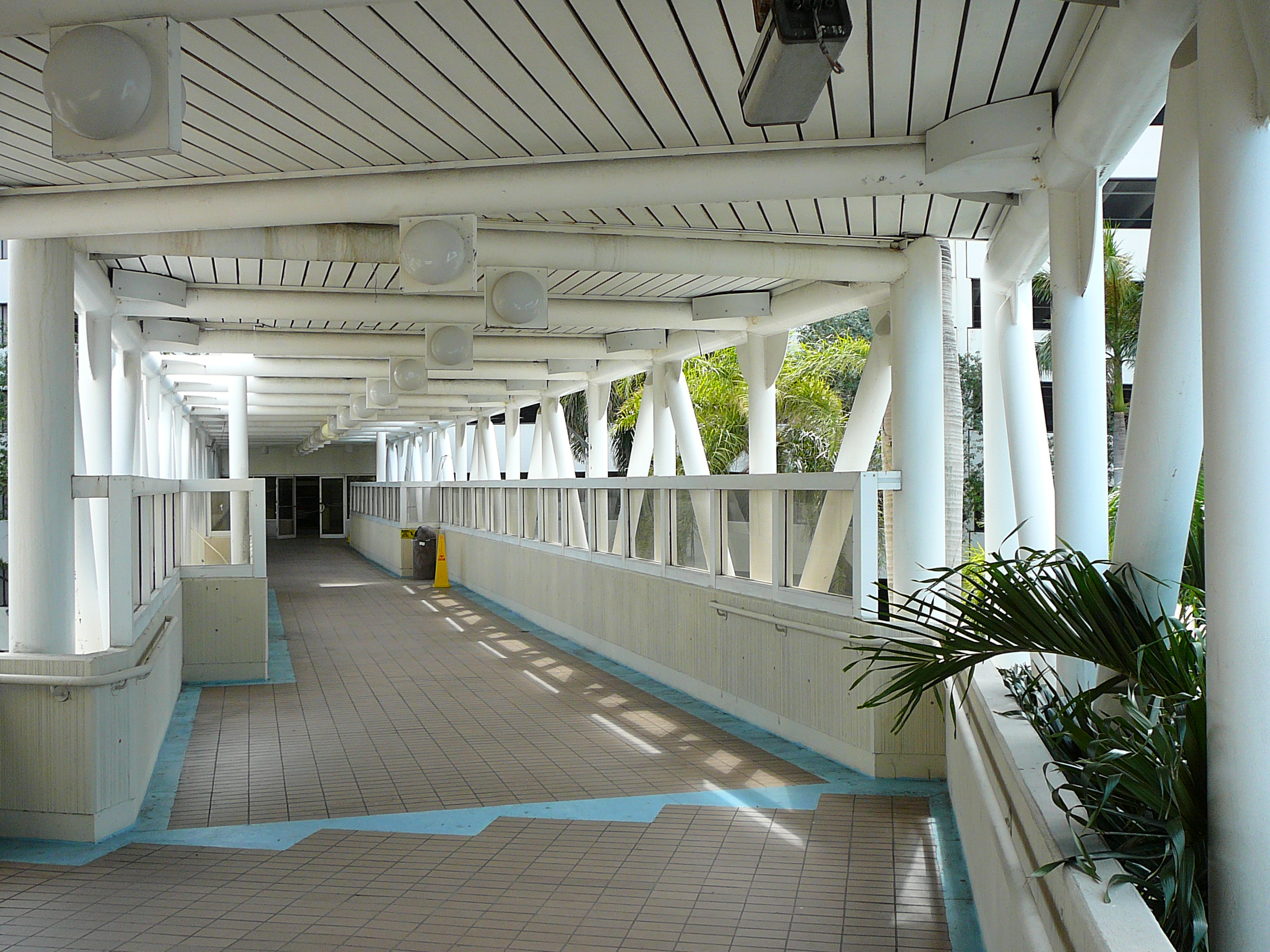
The skywalk connecting the Omni

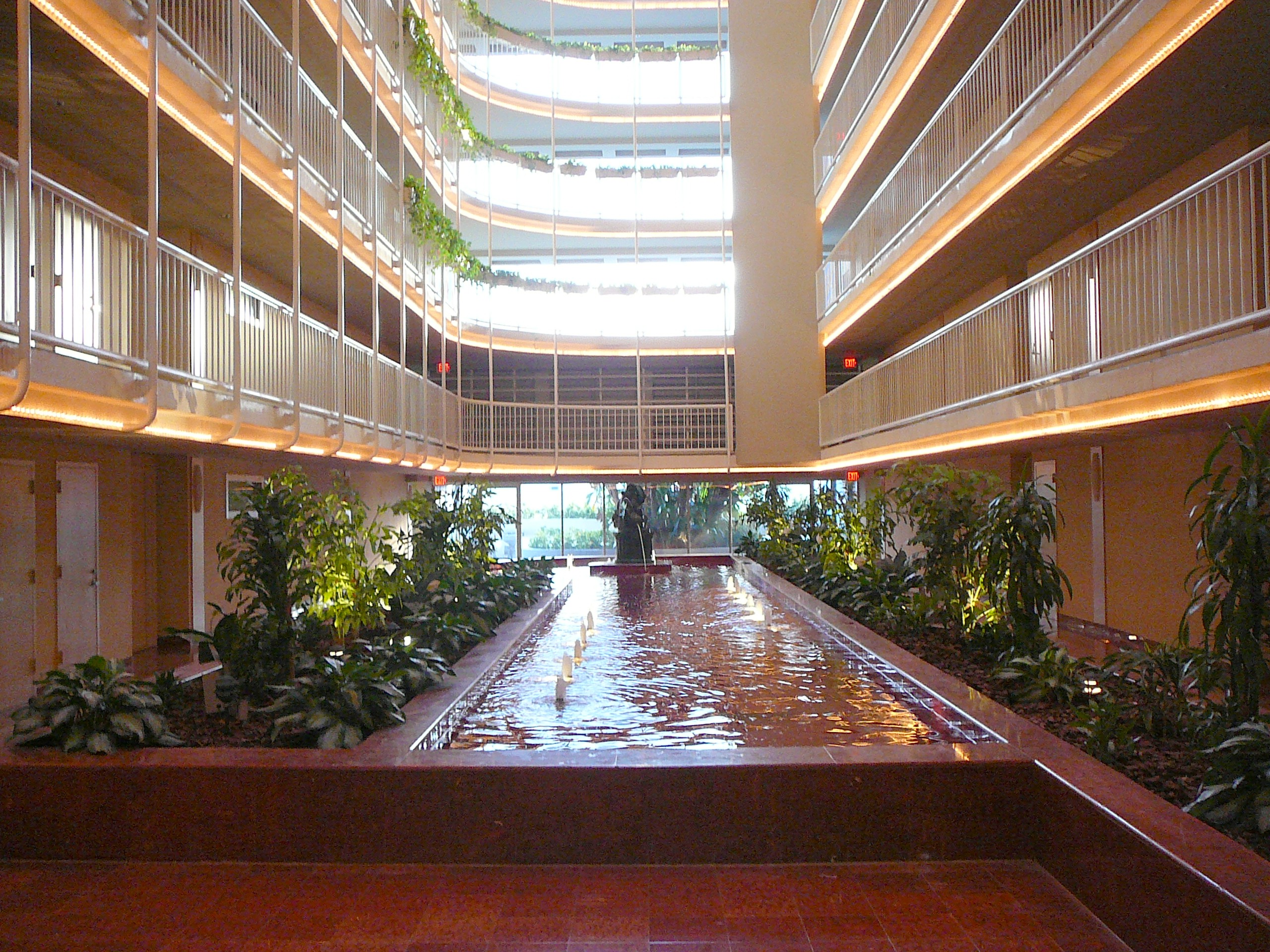
The west atrium (10th floor)

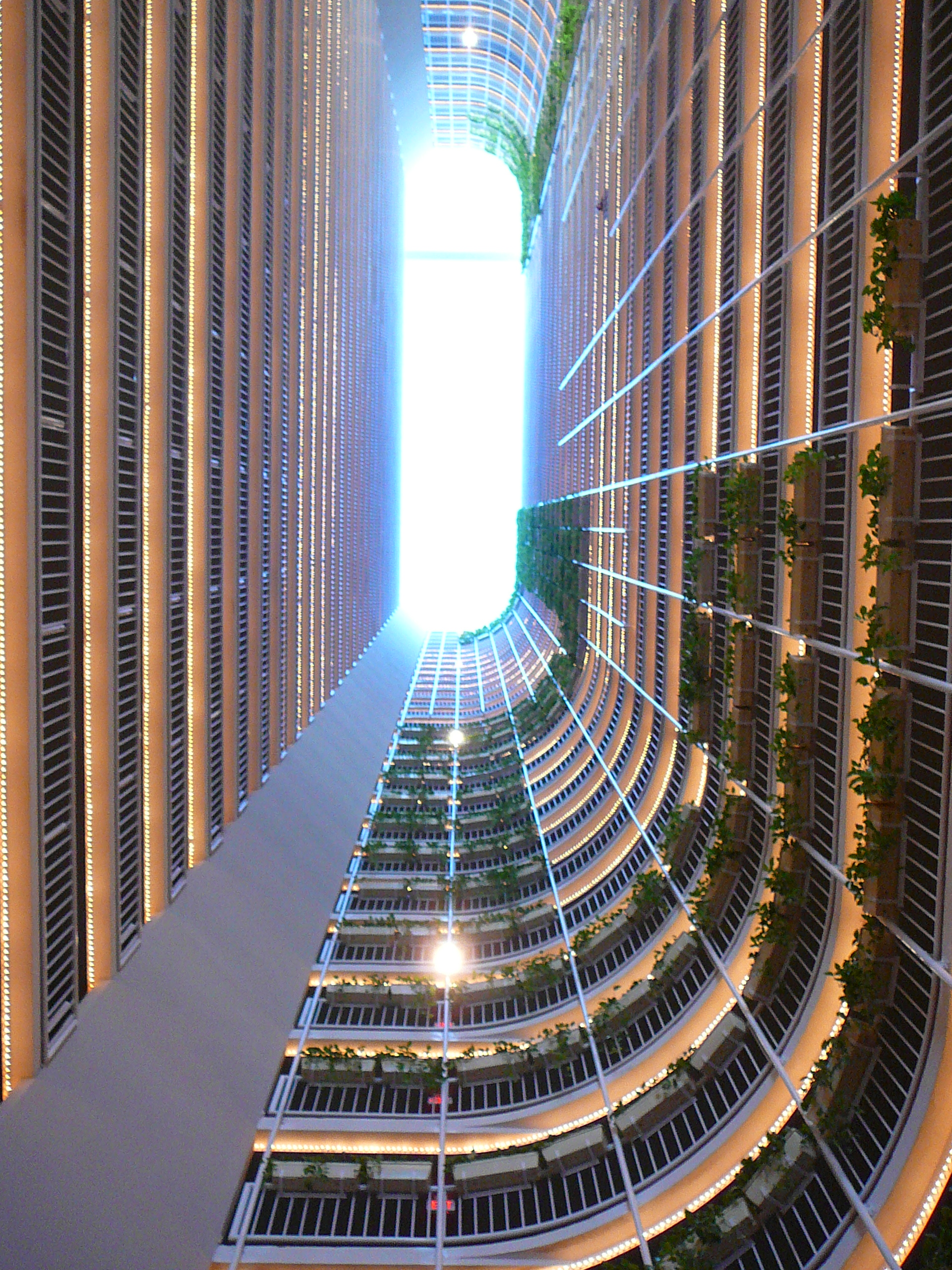
The west atrium, looking up

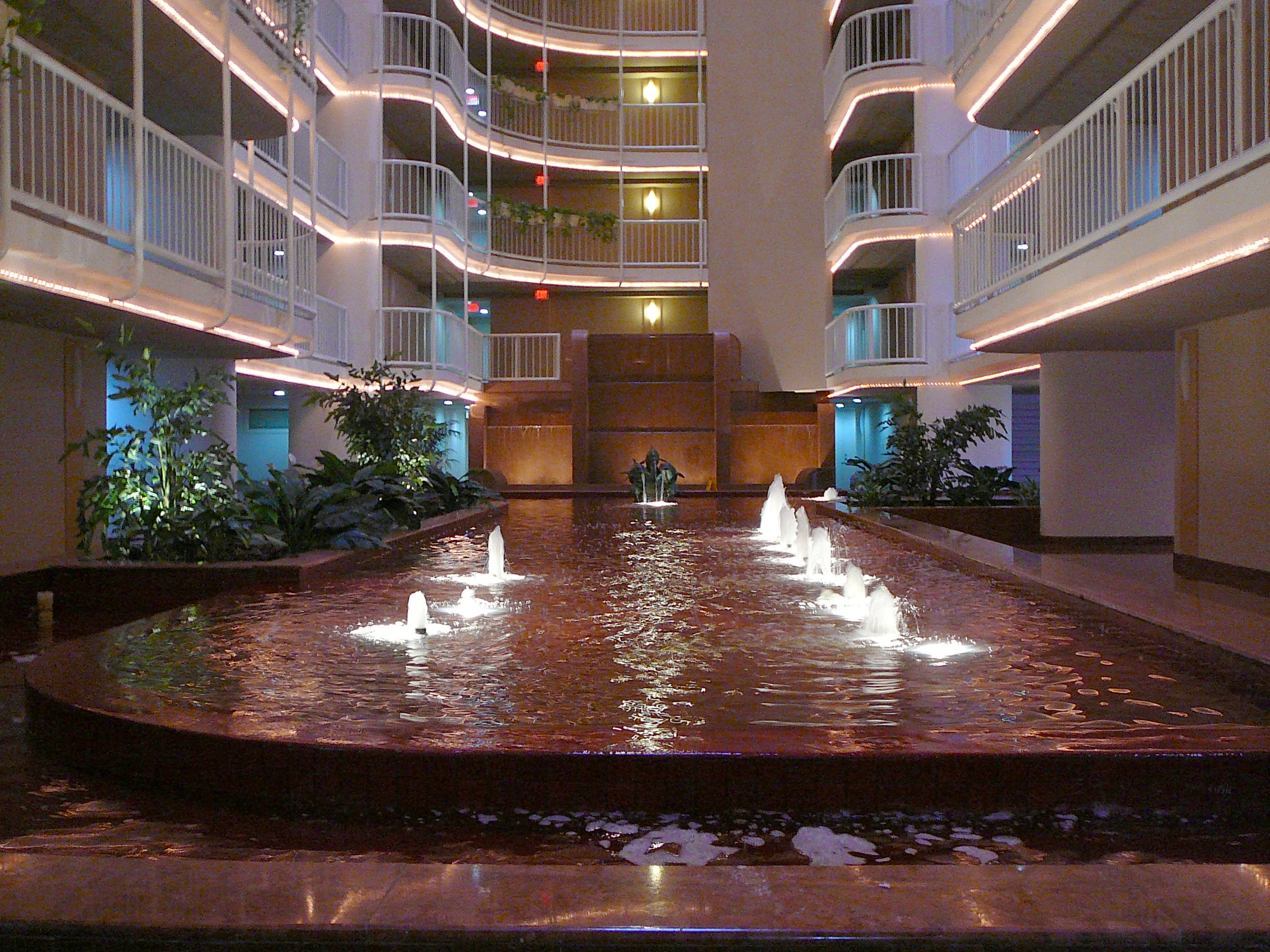
The east atrium (10th floor)

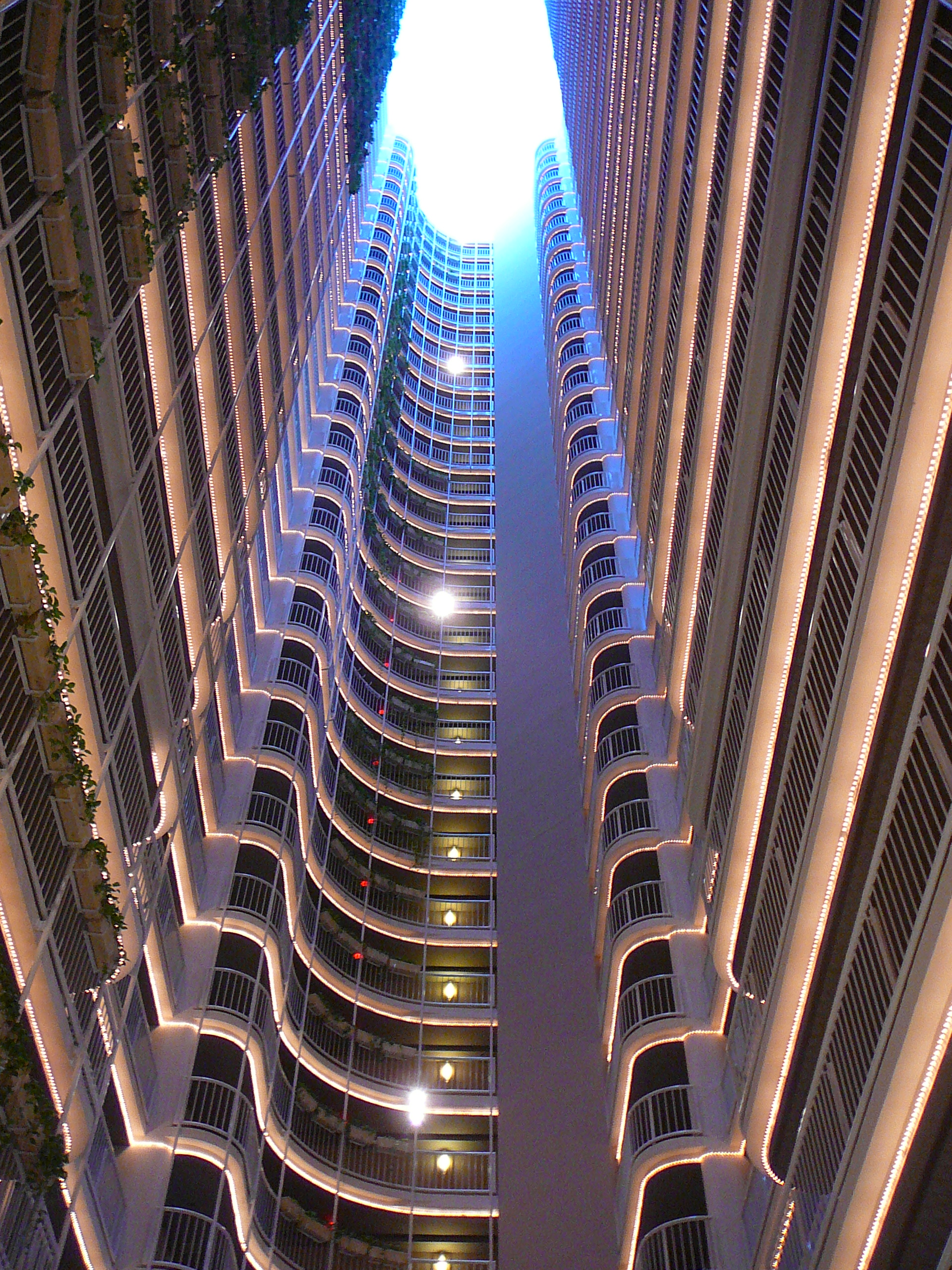
The east atrium, looking up

== See also ==
- List of tallest buildings in Miami
- Omni International Mall
