= Adrienne Arsht Center station =

Miami Metromover station

Adrienne Arsht Center
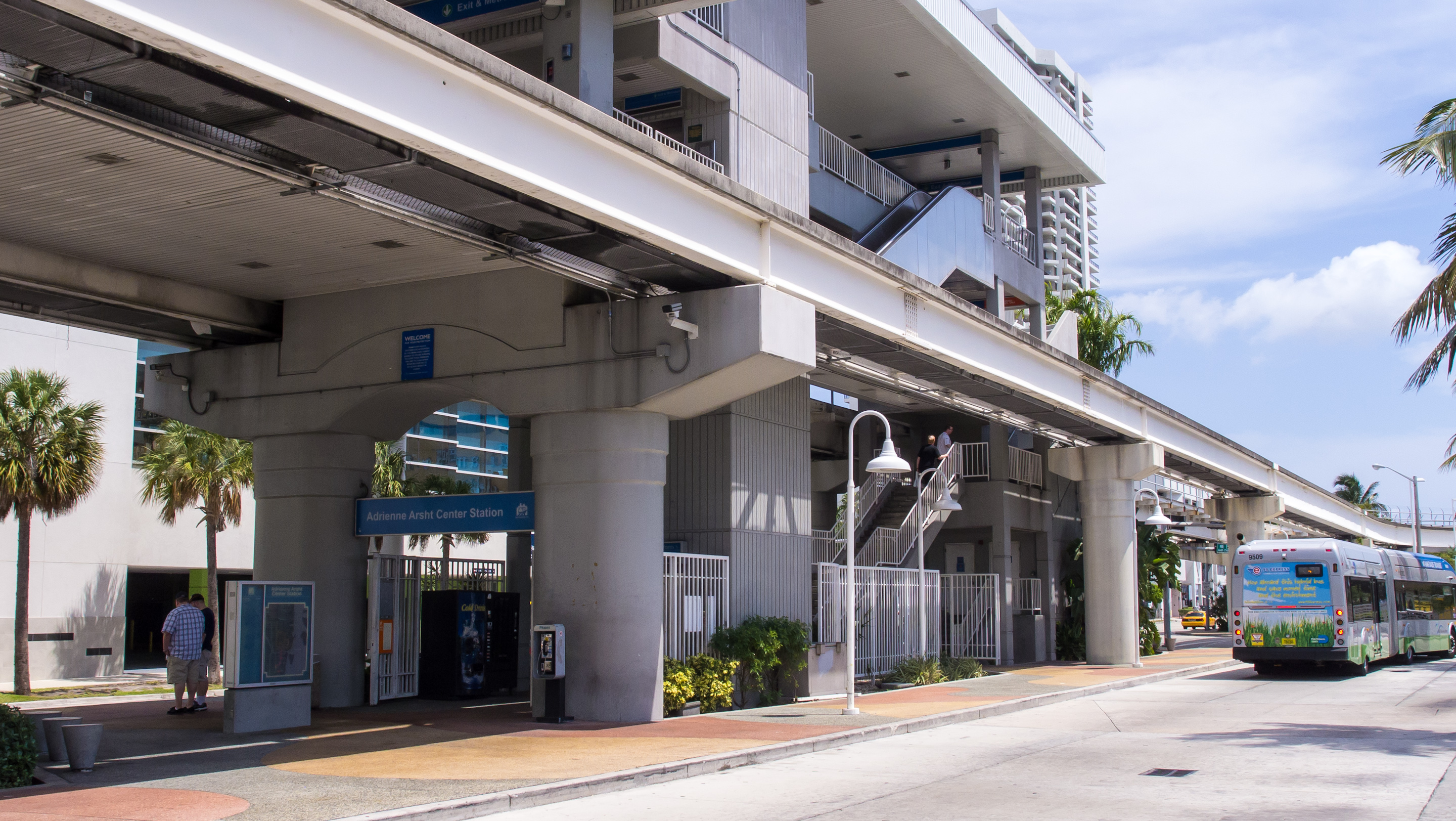
- View of the station and a departing Metrobus city bus

General information
- Location: 1455 Biscayne Boulevard; Miami, Florida
- Coordinates: 25°47′21″N 80°11′17″W
- Owner: Miami-Dade County
- Platforms: 1 island platform
- Tracks: 2
- Connections: Metrobus: 3, 14, 15, 20, 203

Construction
- Accessible: Yes

History
- Opened: May 26, 1994
- Former names: Omni (1994–2009)

Services
Preceding station	Miami-Dade Transit	Following station
Museum Park toward Downtown	Omni Loop	School Board Terminus
Location

Adrienne Arsht Center station, formerly Omni station, is a Metromover station in the Arts & Entertainment District neighborhood of Downtown, Miami, Florida, United States. The station is adjacent to the Adrienne Arsht Center for the Performing Arts, just west of The Miami Herald building and the Venetian Causeway, and directly south of the MacArthur Causeway.

This station is located near the intersection of Northeast 15th Avenue and Biscayne Boulevard (U.S. 1). It opened to service May 26, 1994, as Omni station.

== Places of interest ==
- Arts & Entertainment District
  - Adrienne Arsht Center for the Performing Arts
  - Omni Hotel
  - The Grand Doubletree
  - Opera Tower
  - Platinum on the Bay
  - Trinity Episcopal Church
  - One Herald Plaza (The Miami Herald Building)
  - Miami International University of Art & Design
  - Biscayne Bay Marriott International
  - Crowne Plaza Hotel
  - Hotel Grand Prix
  - Quantum Towers
  - The Chelsea Tower
  - 1490 Biscayne Building
  - Soleil Tower and Complex
  - Urbana Tower
  - Plaza Venetia Hotel
- Miami Beach and Venetian Islands (via MacArthur Causeway and Venetian Causeway)
