= Arts & Entertainment District =

- Neighborhood of Miami
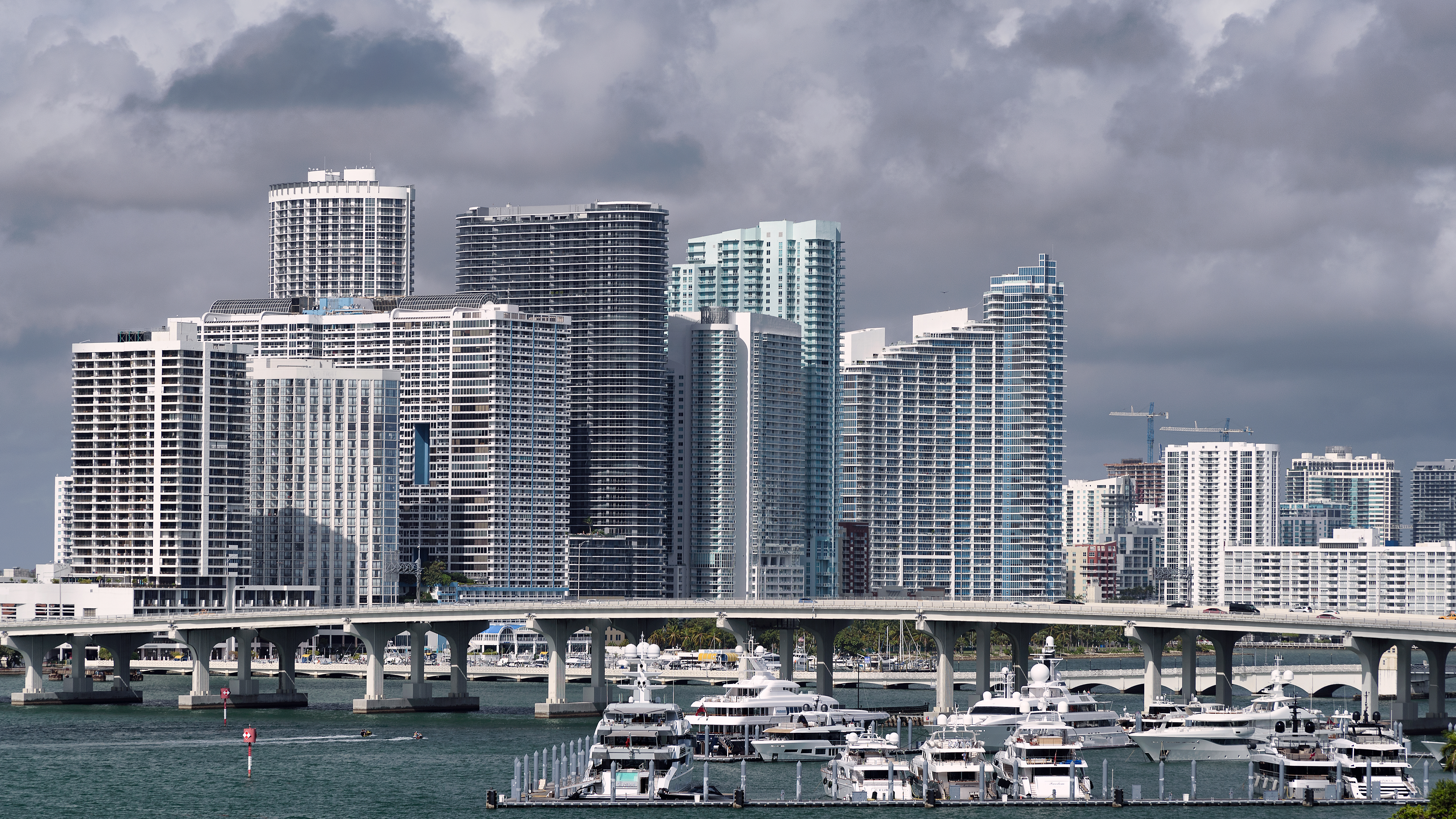
- The Arts & Entertainment District skyline, pictured in 2019

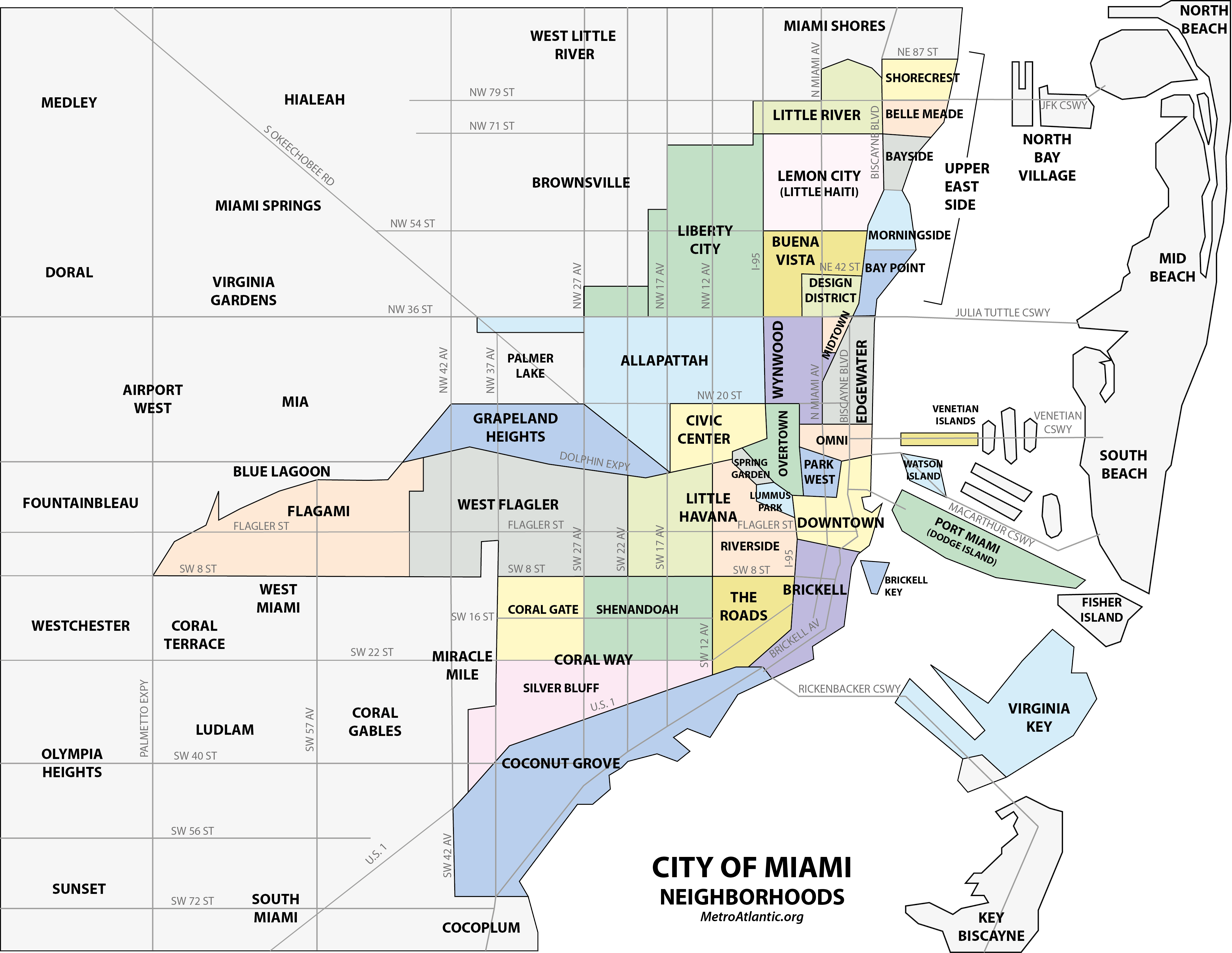
- Arts & Entertainment District within the City of Miami
- Coordinates: 25.798964°N 80.189552°W
- Country: United States
- State: Florida
- County: Miami-Dade County
- City: Miami

Population (2010)
  - Total: 11,033 (District population only); 71,000 (Greater Downtown population)
  - Density: 20,585/sq mi (7,948/km^{2})
- Time zone: UTC-05 (EST)
- ZIP Code: 33132
- Area codes: 305, 786
- Website: Miami Arts & Entertainment District

The Arts & Entertainment District, or previously known as Omni, is a neighborhood of Downtown Miami, Florida. It is bound roughly by North 19th Street to the north, North 10th Street to the south, North West 2nd Avenue to the west, and Biscayne Boulevard to the east.

The Arts & Entertainment District is an urban, residential neighborhood with many high-rise residential towers, as well as some smaller scale historic buildings. It is home to the Adrienne Arsht Center for the Performing Arts, the old Miami Herald headquarters (now located in Doral), and the Omni International Mall. Until 2014, it was one of the neighborhoods that hosted the annual Miami International Boat Show at the Sea Isle Marina. The City of Miami Cemetery, one of Miami's oldest cemeteries, is also located in the district, as well as the historic Women's Club, and some of Miami's oldest churches and synagogues.

The Arts & Entertainment District is served by the Omni Loop branch of the Metromover and by the Metrorail via Metromover at Government Center.

== History ==
From the 1920s to the 1950s, the Omni area was a high-end shopping area with many major department stores along Biscayne Boulevard, such as Sears, Roebuck and Company (whose tower still stands at the Arsht Center), a Burdines directly to the north at the southwestern corner of Northeast 14th Street, and a Jordan Marsh at the northeastern corner of Northeast 15th Street built in 1956). By 1930, this area of Biscayne Boulevard was the home of a Sears and a Burdines sharing the eastern half of a block and the Shrine Building (which still stands at NE 14th Street and Biscayne Blvd), all of which were designed and built by the Biscayne Boulevard Company in the Art Deco architectural style. The area from NE 13th to NE 16th Street was envisioned as a high-end shopping district. By 1930, early merchants in the Shrine Building included the Piggly-Wiggly grocery store, Biscayne-Page Electric Company, and the John Turner Piano Store on the first floor. Other merchants in 1930 were the Home Drug Store and the Burroughs Adding Machine Company. The Sears location was the earliest Art Deco building in the county. The Burdines location, an attached building directly to the north, would later close and be absorbed by Sears at some point with Burdines later reopening a block away to the northeast in Jordan Marsh's former location now attached to a mall.

In 1977, the Omni International Mall opened replacing much of the street-level stores with a suburban-style shopping mall. While the Jordan Marsh was built earlier in 1956, conforming to the Biscayne Boulevard Company's original pedestrian shopping-oriented plan, the mall's construction caused the closure of two streets and the demolition of two city blocks. shared a block before Burdines moved to mall The mall brought many upscale stores to the Omni such as Emilio Pucci, Givenchy, and Hermes. By the 1990s, however, the mall began to falter, and in 1991, Jordan Marsh closed, and in 1998, so did JC Penney. Burdines, after sharing the Biscayne Boulevard side of a block with Sears since 1930, moved into the former Jordan Marsh for a year. In 2000, the mall closed, and the area was reconverted into offices in 2007. Today, it houses a few office tenants and the Miami International University of Art and Design. It is also the corporate home of the Greater Miami Chamber of Commerce. The name of the neighborhood today, comes from the name of the Omni Mall.

Two sections of Biscayne Boulevard between within the area, between Northeast 17th Terrace and Northeast 27th Street and between Northeast 29th Street and Northeast 31st Street, predate the boulevard itself and it was built with gentle, barely noticeable curves and slanted sections between to adapt existing streets, a result of two factors. The former municipality of North Miami, prior to being annexed by Miami, had a different street grid of named roads from downtown Miami's blocks carefully planned by Henry Flagler. Biscayne Boulevard, then known as Bay Shore Drive and then Biscayne Drive, was not part of the short-lived community's street grid or plans and the extension of Biscayne Boulevard north of Northwest 14th Street to the county line would not be planned or completed until several decades later, after its annexation by Miami. Edgewater, Midtown, Wynwood, and parts of Overtown represent the original municipality of North Miami located roughly north of North 14th Street, east of Northwest 7th Avenue, south of North 36th Street, and west of Biscayne Bay in the early 1910s prior to it being absorbed by Miami in 1913 in its first in a series of annexations and the name being reused significantly to the north by the community once known as Arch Creek, directly north of Miami's city limits at their peak; unlike South Miami which has never bordered its namesake, the name North Miami has twice directly bordered Miami's northern doorstep.

In the 2000s, rapid construction of high-rise residential skyscrapers has revitalized the neighborhood from urban blight. The area around Margaret Pace Park has seen large population growth from 2000 to 2010. Omni today has a large residential population, and with continued retail and residential construction in the neighborhood, has grown into its own unique neighborhood in the city.

== Education ==
- Miami-Dade County Public Schools
- Miami International University of Art and Design, private college
- Aspira of Florida Charter School, public charter school

== Transportation ==
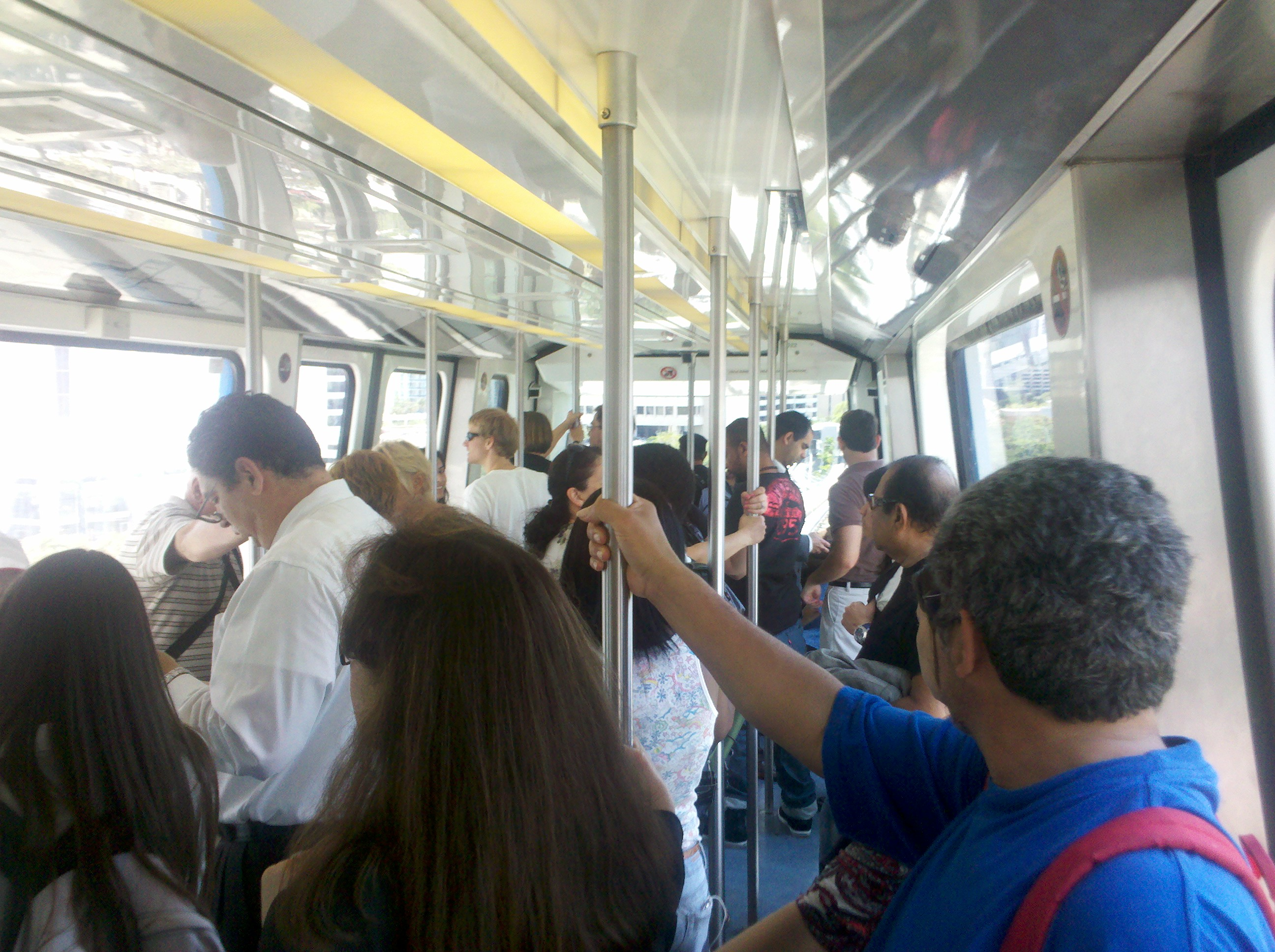
Metromover connects the area's neighborhoods and can get very busy during rush hour.

Metromover train system runs three lines throughout Downtown (the Downtown Loop, the Omni Loop, and the Brickell Loop). The Metromover connects with Metrorail and is free. There are two Metromover stations in the district- School Board Station and Adrienne Arsht Center. Transfers can be made to the Metrorail, Miami's heavy rail system, at Government Center, as well as to the Brickell and Inner Metromover loops. Metrorail has stops throughout Miami with connections to Miami International Airport, all Miami-Dade County bus lines, Tri-Rail, and Amtrak. The main bus station is also located in the district, next to the Arsht Center at the Adrienne Arsht Center station.

The Arts & Entertainment District is served by Metrobus throughout the area, the Miami Metrorail, and the Metromover:

Metrorail:

- Government Center (NW First Street and First Avenue)

Metromover:

- Omni Loop

As an urban and pedestrian-friendly area with an extensive public transit network, the Arts & Entertainment District and the greater Downtown area, is one of the areas in Miami where a car-free lifestyle is commonplace. Many residents get around by foot, bicycle, Metromover or by taxi. The Metromover is a popular alternative to walking in the area, especially on rainy, hot or cold days, as the Metromover is free, and stations are located roughly every two blocks throughout the area.

Recently, the City of Miami, along with the Downtown Development Authority, has begun bicycle initiates promoting citywide bike parking and bike lanes, that have made bicycling much more popular for residents. Bike lanes and bike sharrows are currently planned for the majority of Downtown streets to be painted by the end of 2010. The Venetian Causeway is a popular bicycle commuter route that connects South Beach to Omni. The Rickenbacker Causeway is very popular on weekends for recreational bicyclists, and often, bicycles can outnumber cars on the causeway.

== Parks ==
- Margaret Pace Park
- City of Miami Cemetery

== Historic Omni ==
Although one of Miami's oldest neighborhoods, few buildings remain in the district from its founding days. Some historic buildings in the area include:

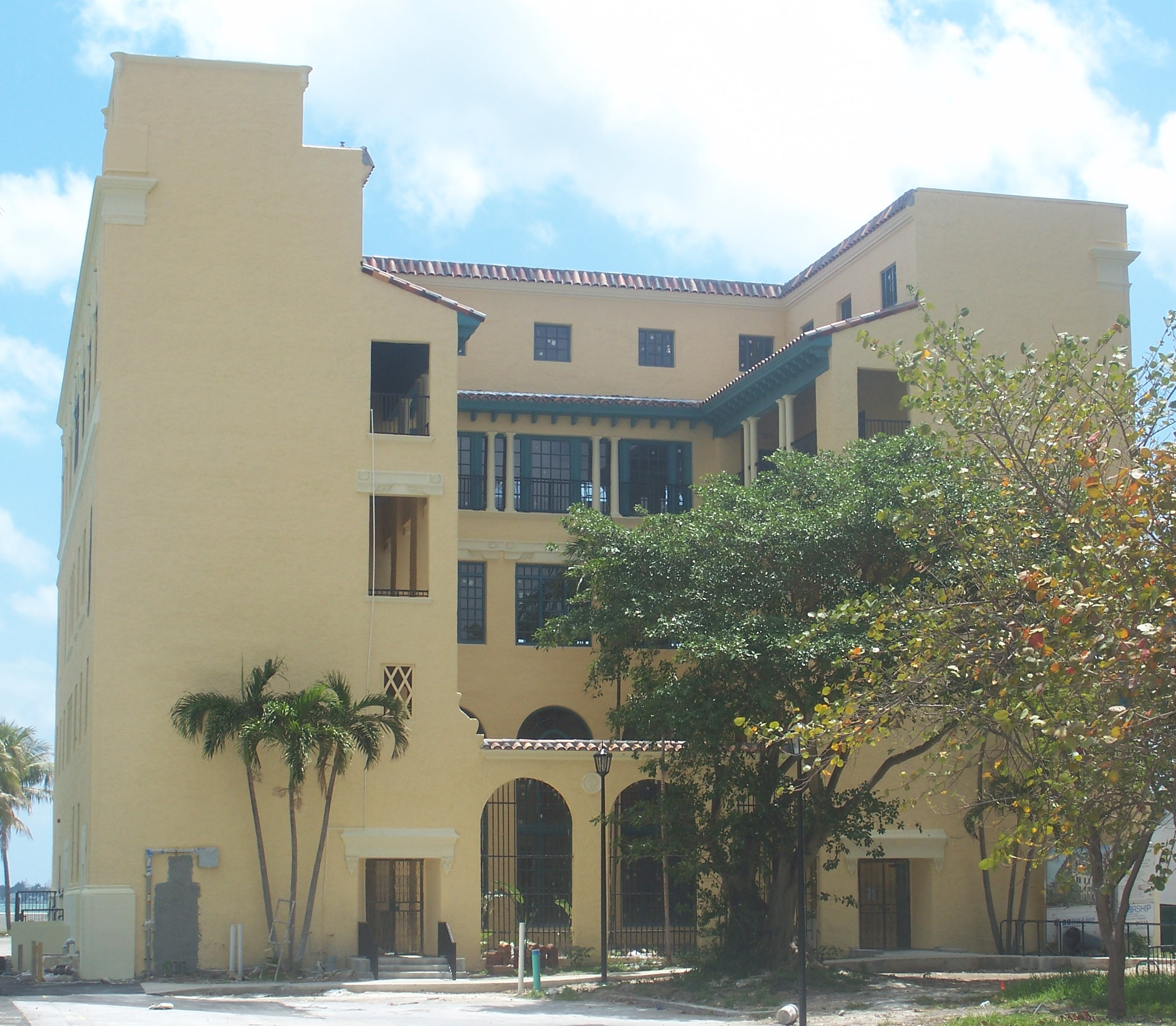
Historic Miami Women's Club, built in 1926

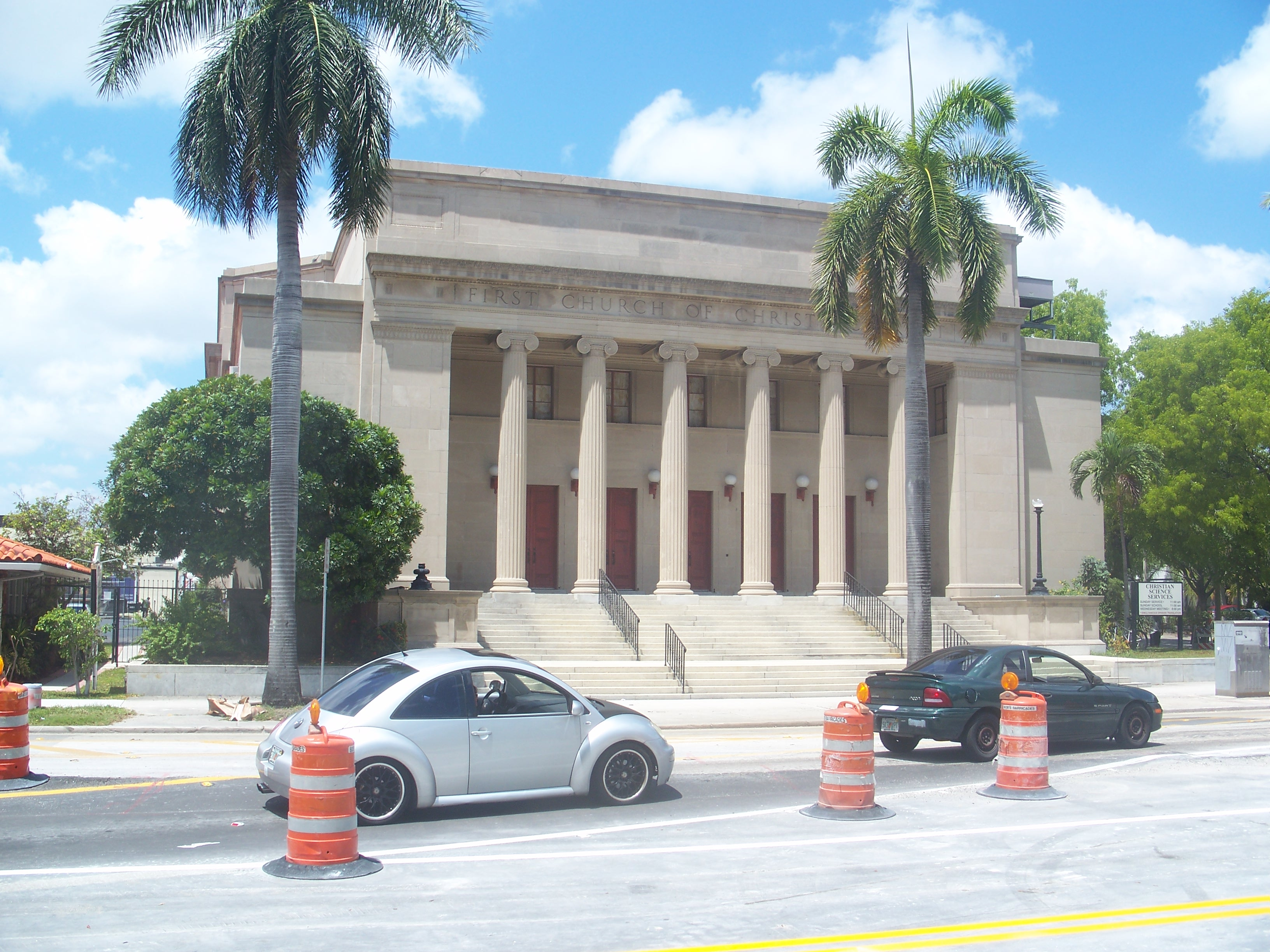
First Church of Christ, Scientist, 1925

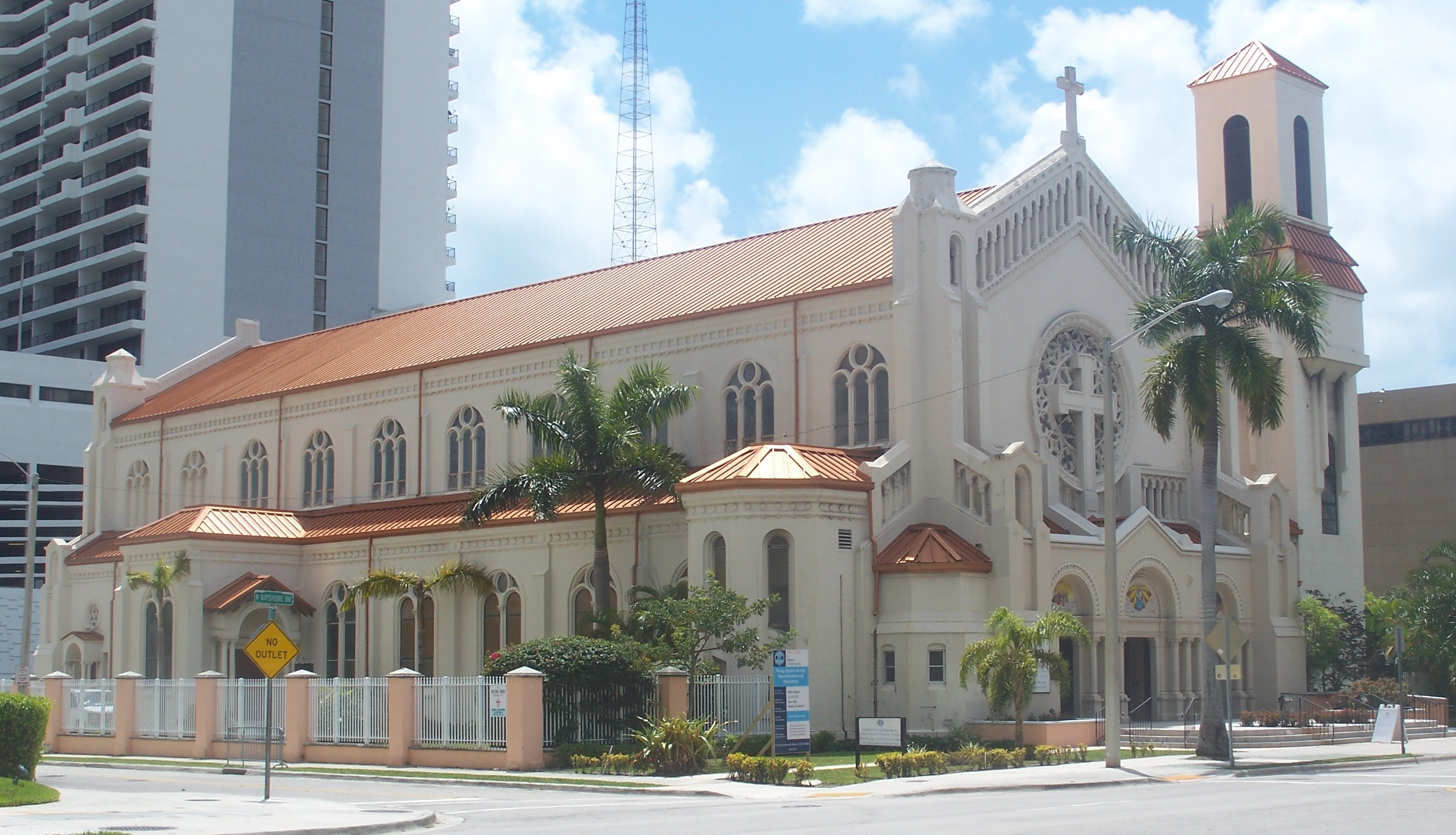
Trinity Episcopal Cathedral, 1925

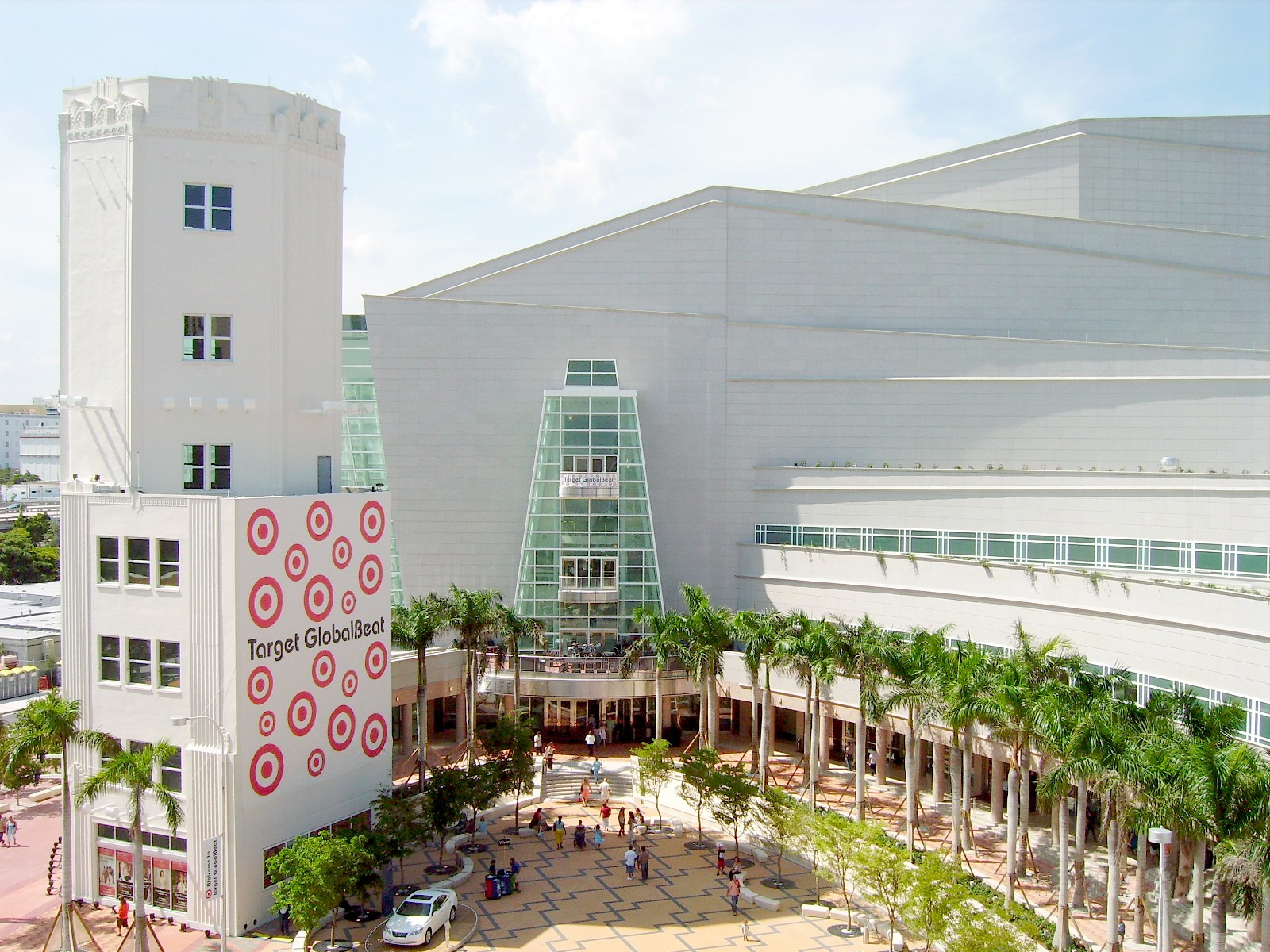
Sears Department Store Tower at the Arsht Center, 1929

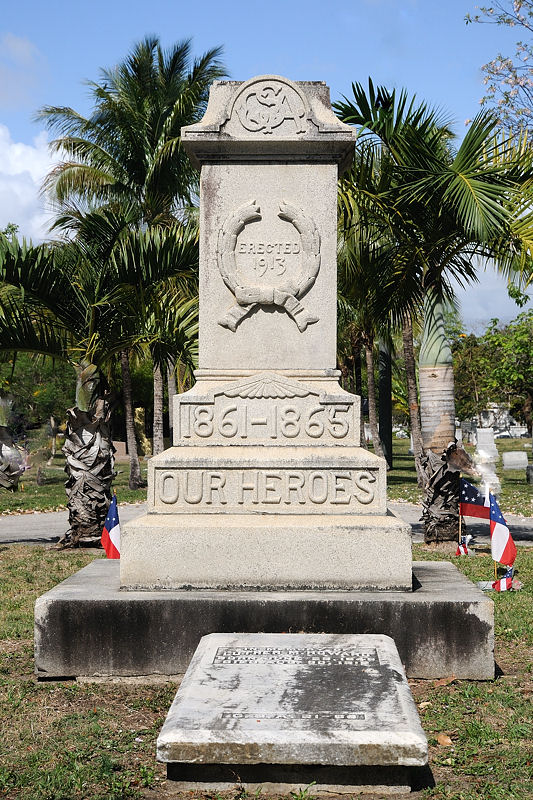
City of Miami Cemetery, oldest and first cemetery in Miami, opened in 1897

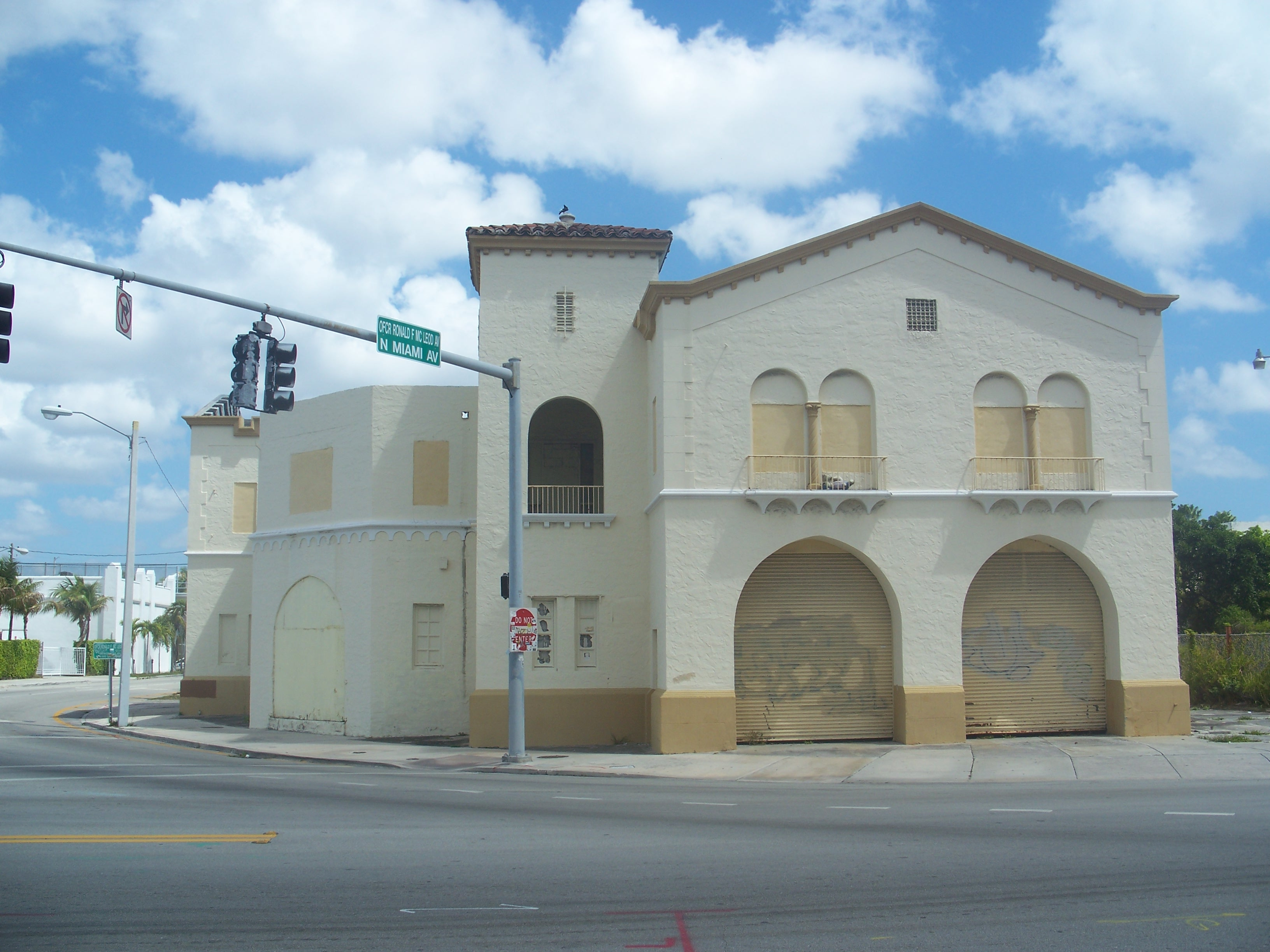
Fire Station No. 2, 1926

== Points of interest ==
- Adrienne Arsht Center for the Performing Arts
- Sea Isle Marina
- Omni International Mall
- Miami Herald
- The Grand Doubletree
- Opera Tower

== Gallery ==
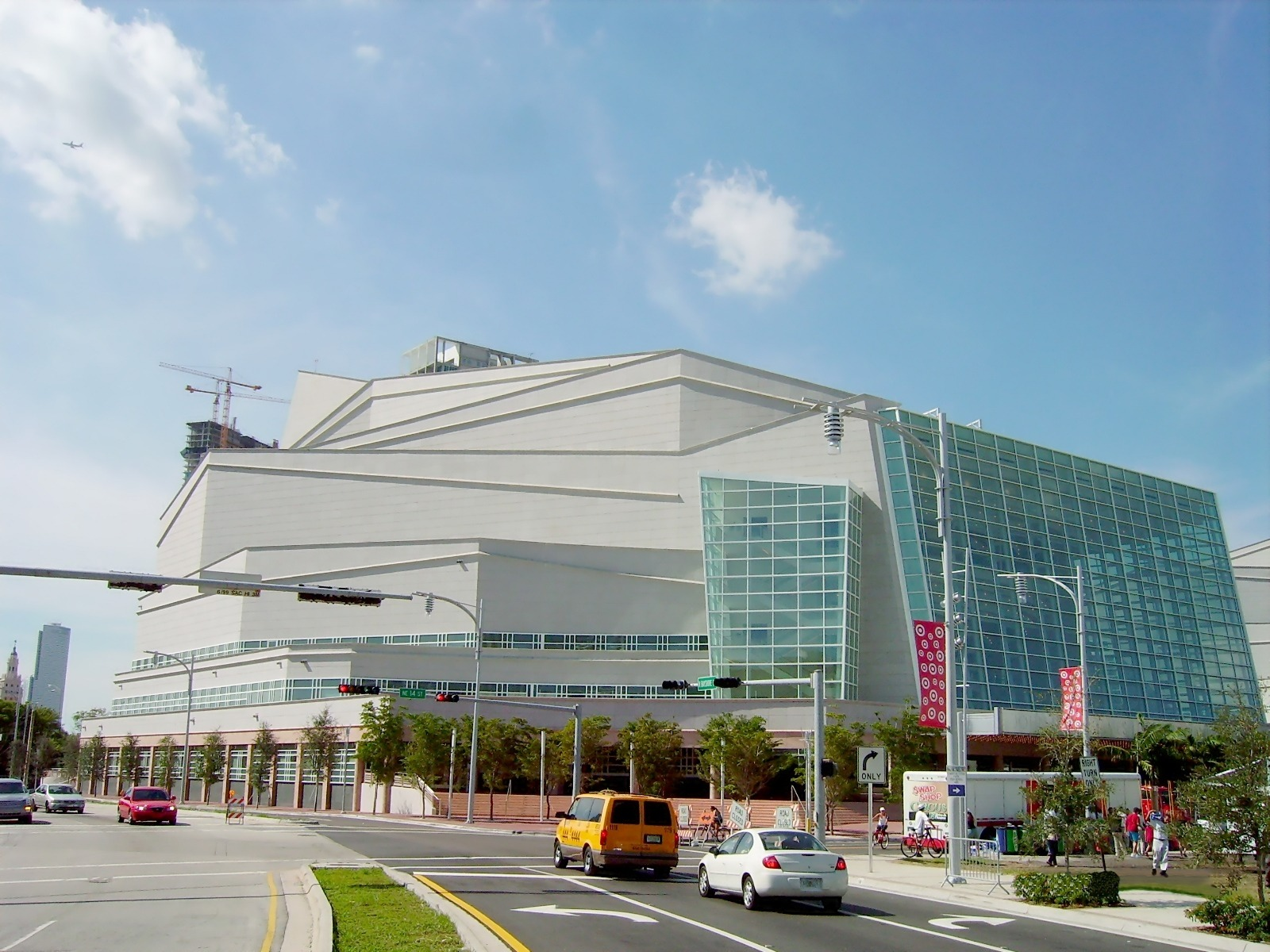
The Knight Concert Hall

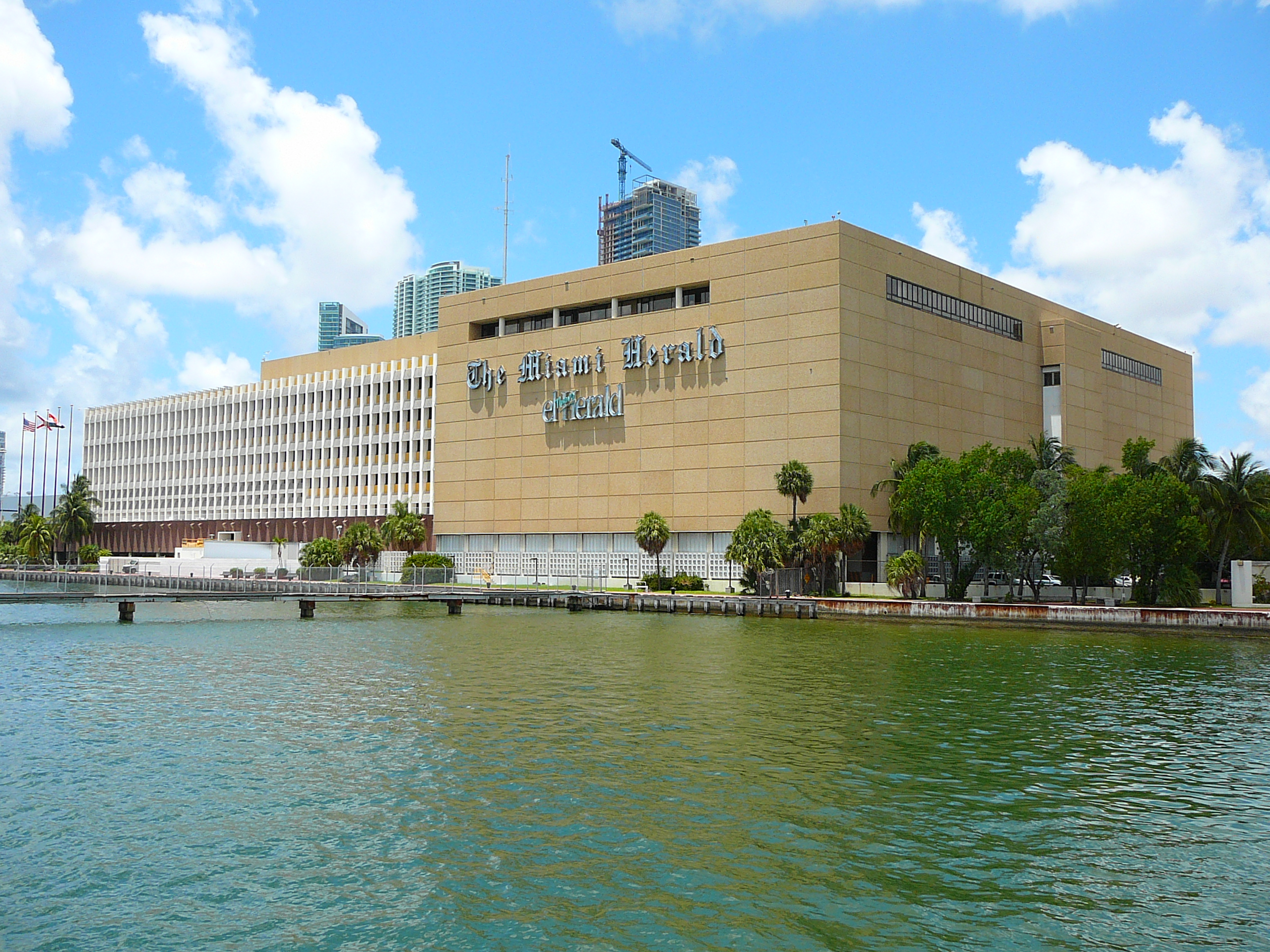
The Miami Herald building

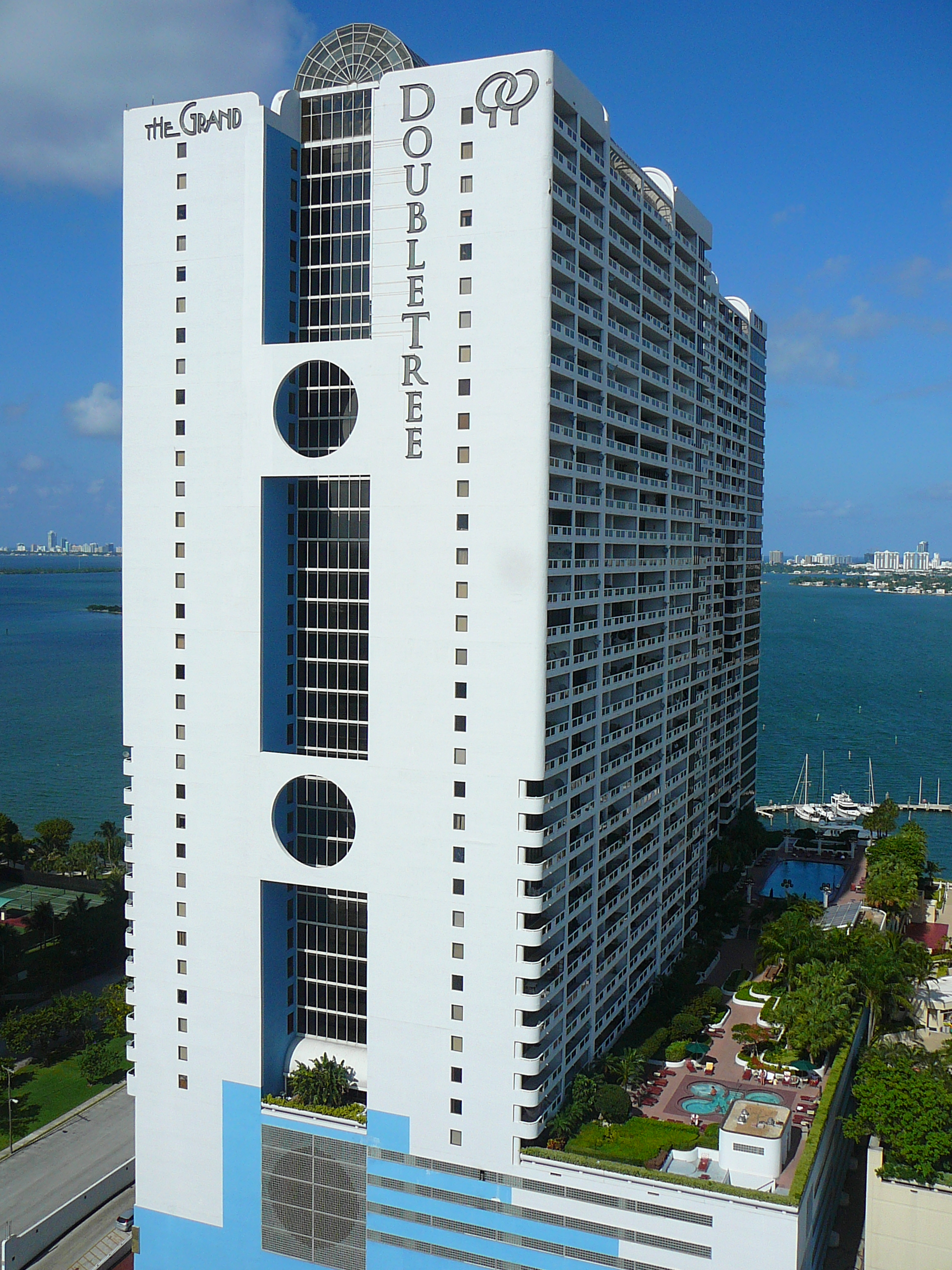
The Grand Doubletree

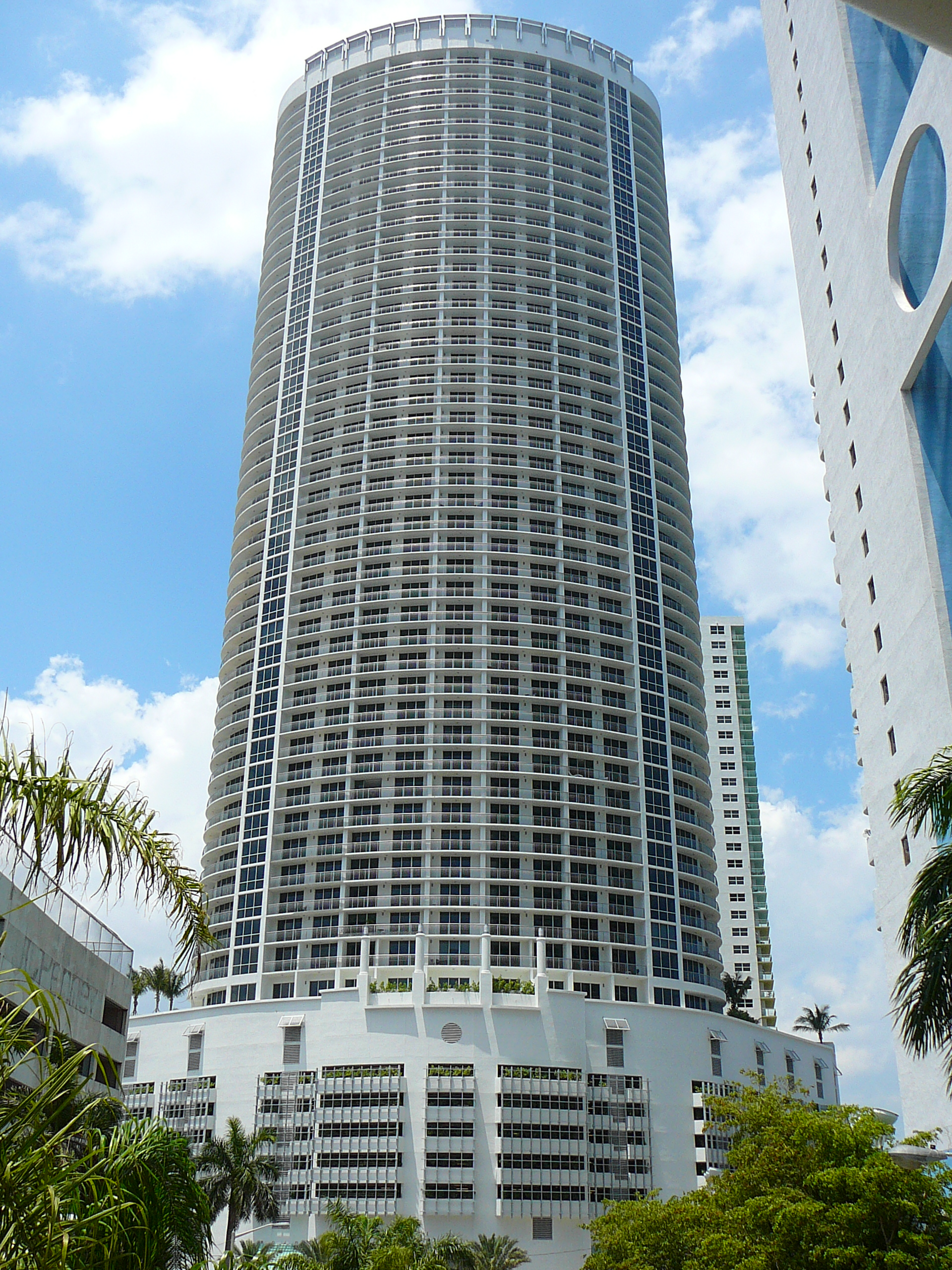
The Opera Tower one of the tallest buildings in Omni

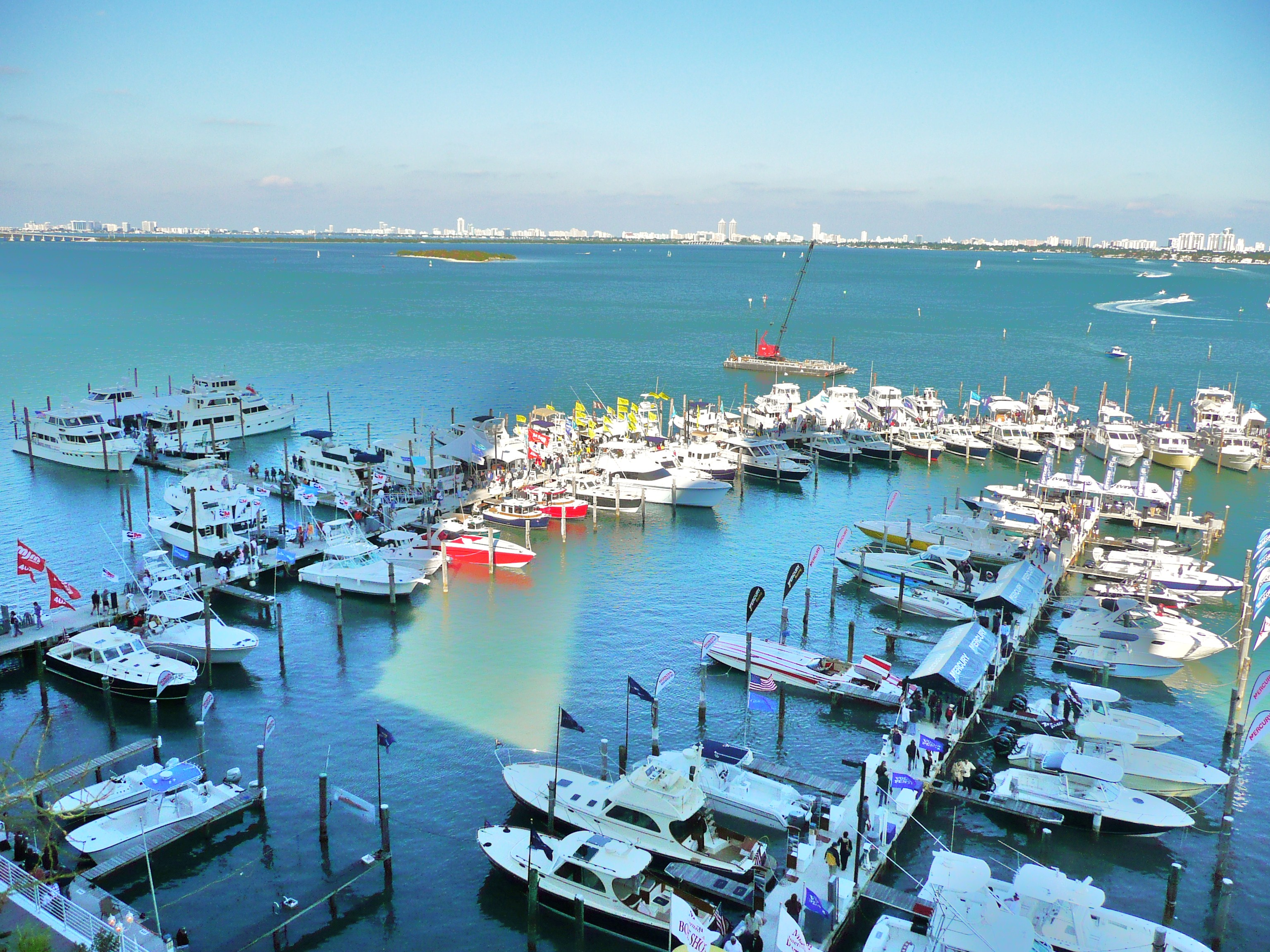
The Sea Isle Marina during the Miami International Boat Show, 2010

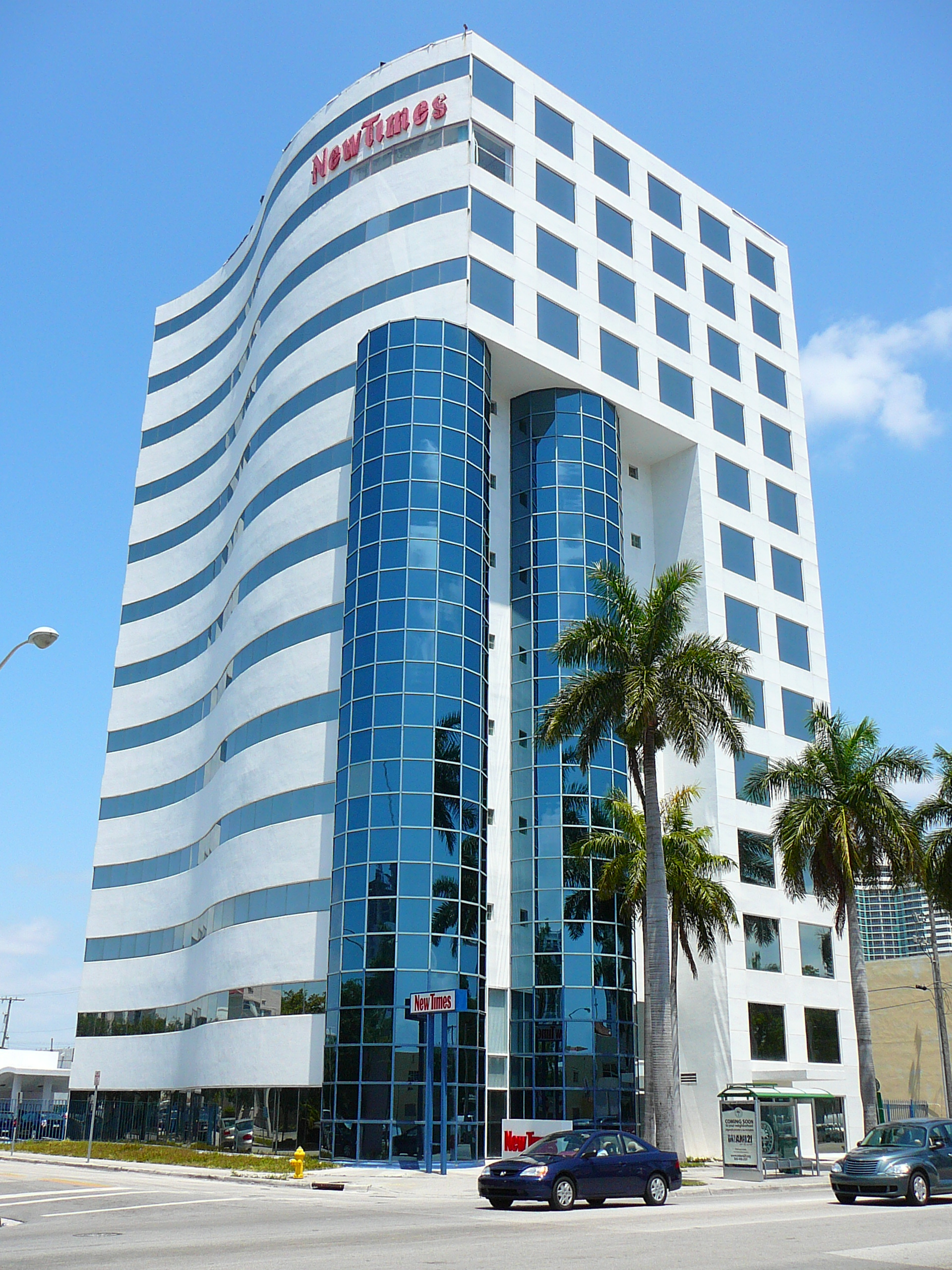
The Miami New Times building

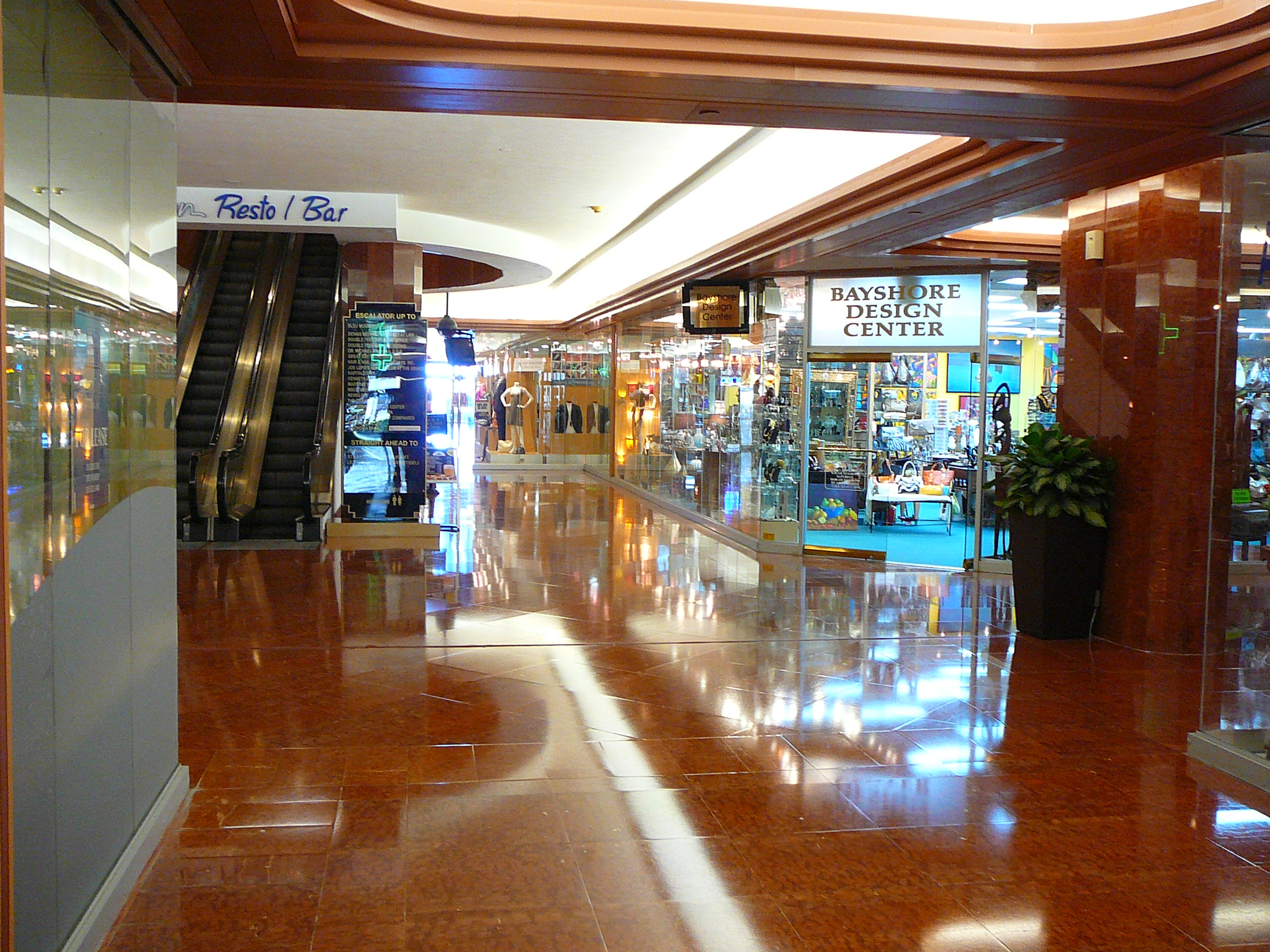
The mall at the Grand

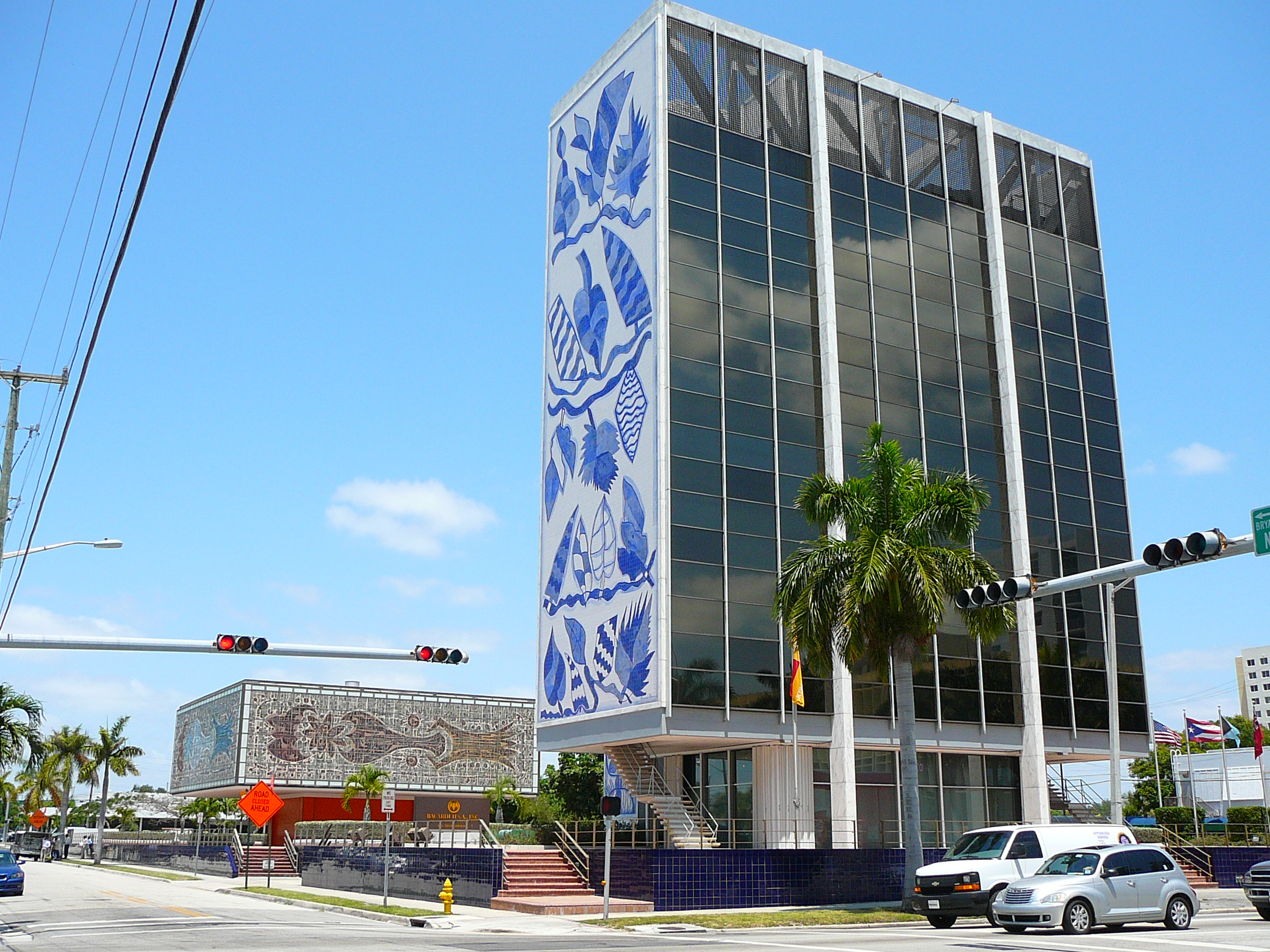
The Bacardi Building

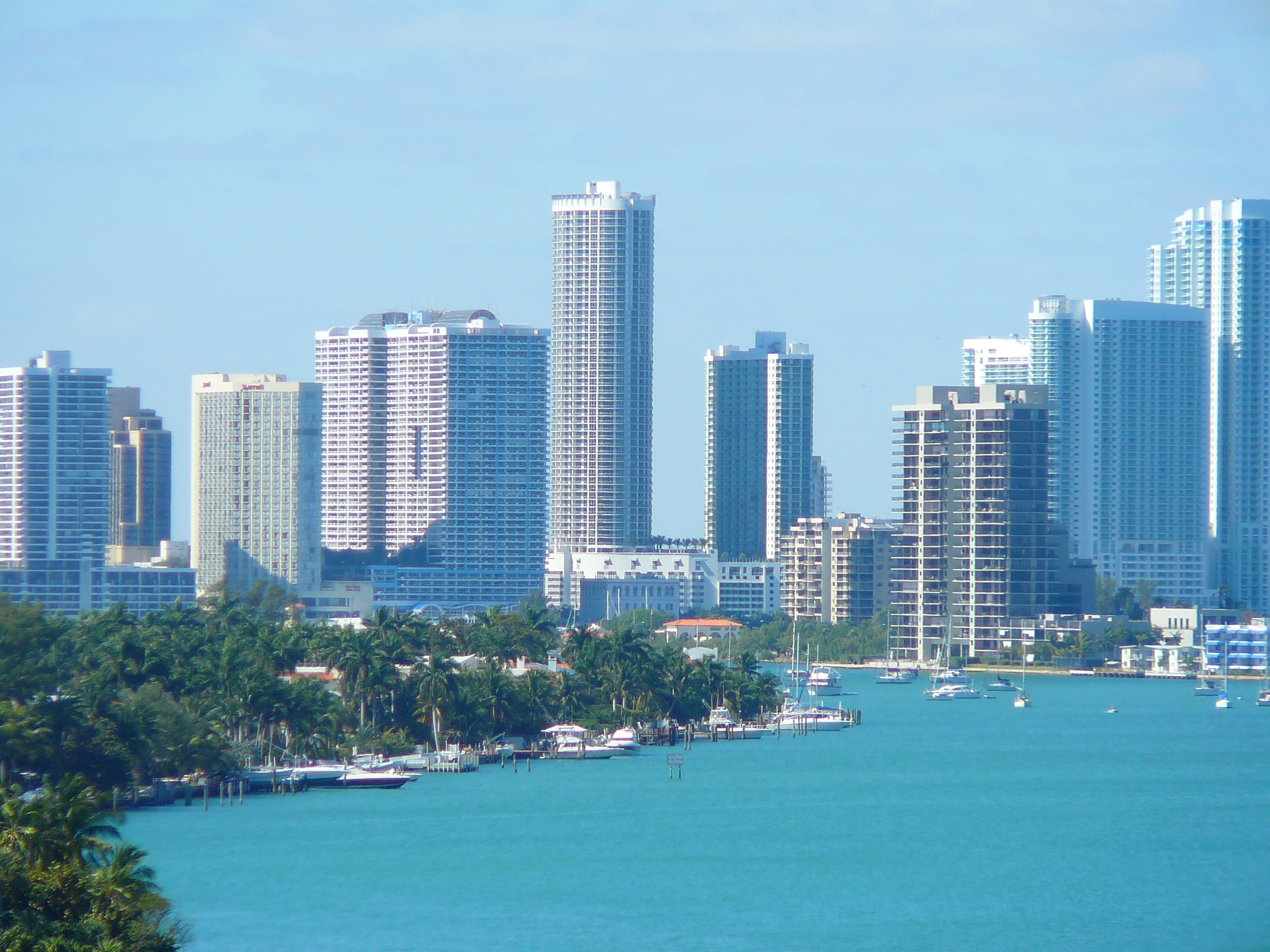
The district skyline as seen from Biscayne Bay to the east
