= Sea Isle Marina =

Coordinates: 25.790882°N 80.184779°W

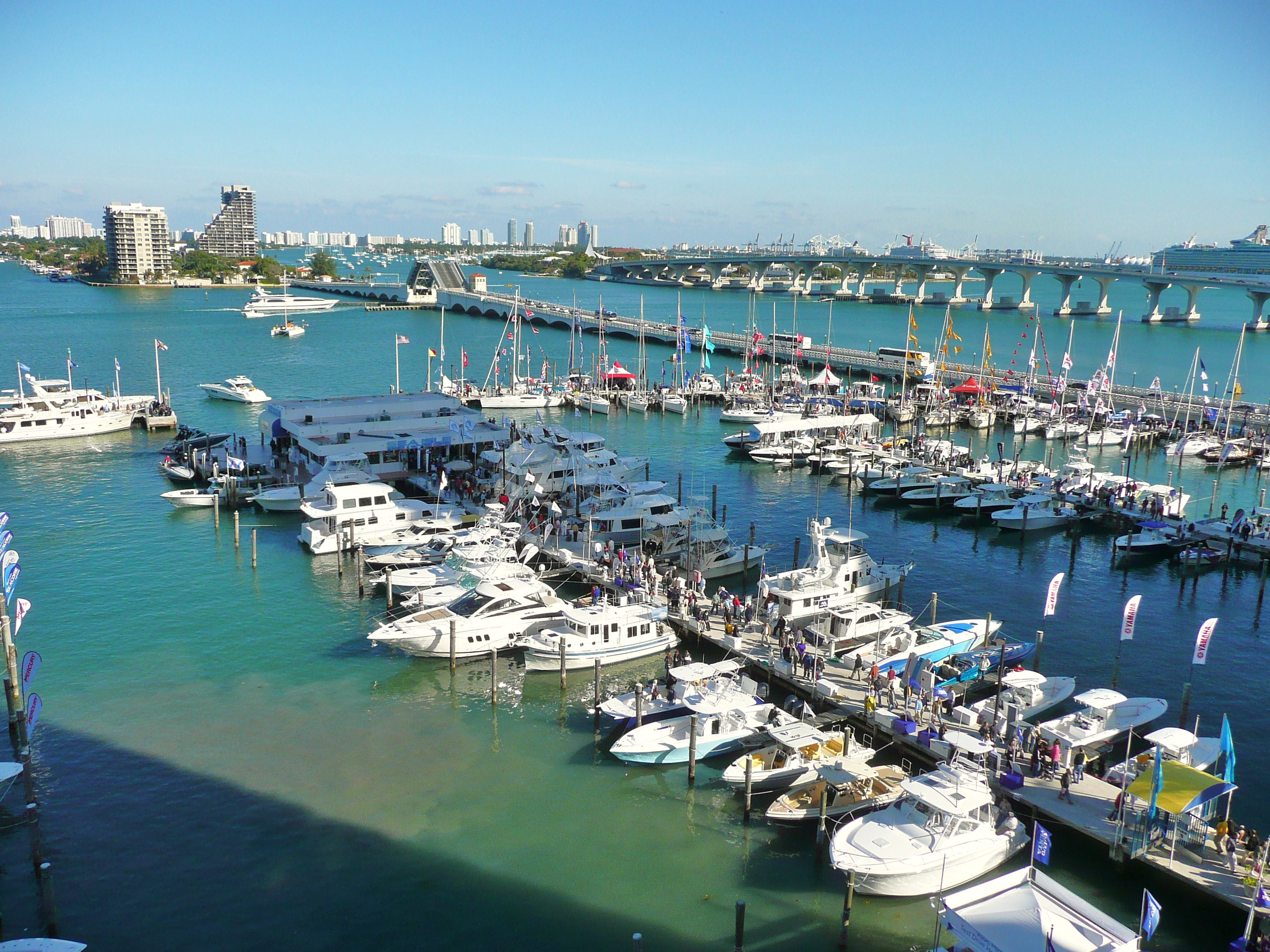
The Sea Isle Marina

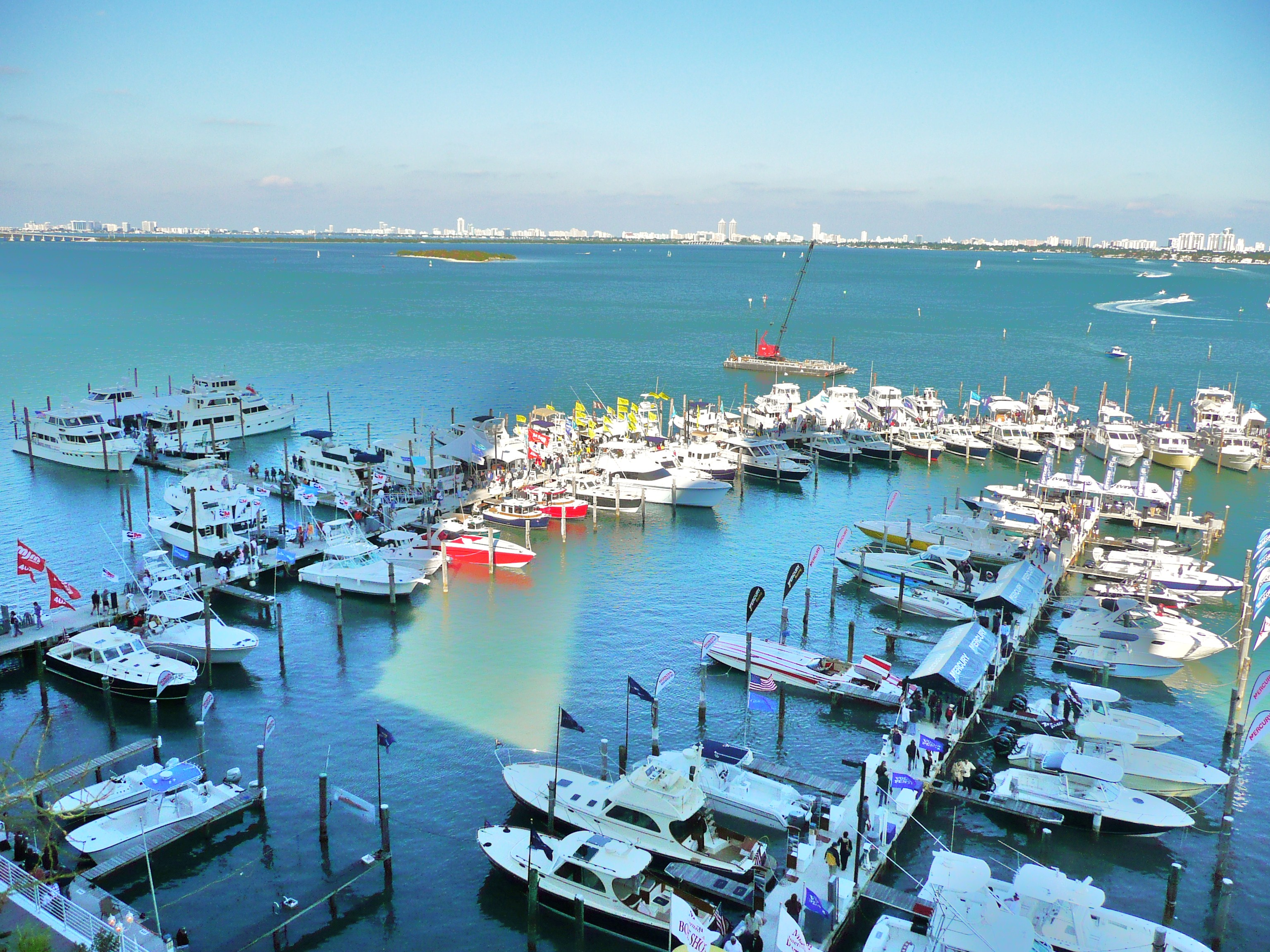
The Sea Isle Marina

The Venetian Marina & Yacht Club is a full-service marina located in Downtown Miami's Arts & Entertainment District, Florida, United States. It is located north of the Venetian Causeway on Biscayne Bay.

Until 2014 it was one of three venues that previously hosted the Miami International Boat Show.
