= Omni International Mall =

Former shopping mall in Miami, Florida

Coordinates: 25.790621°N 80.188052°W

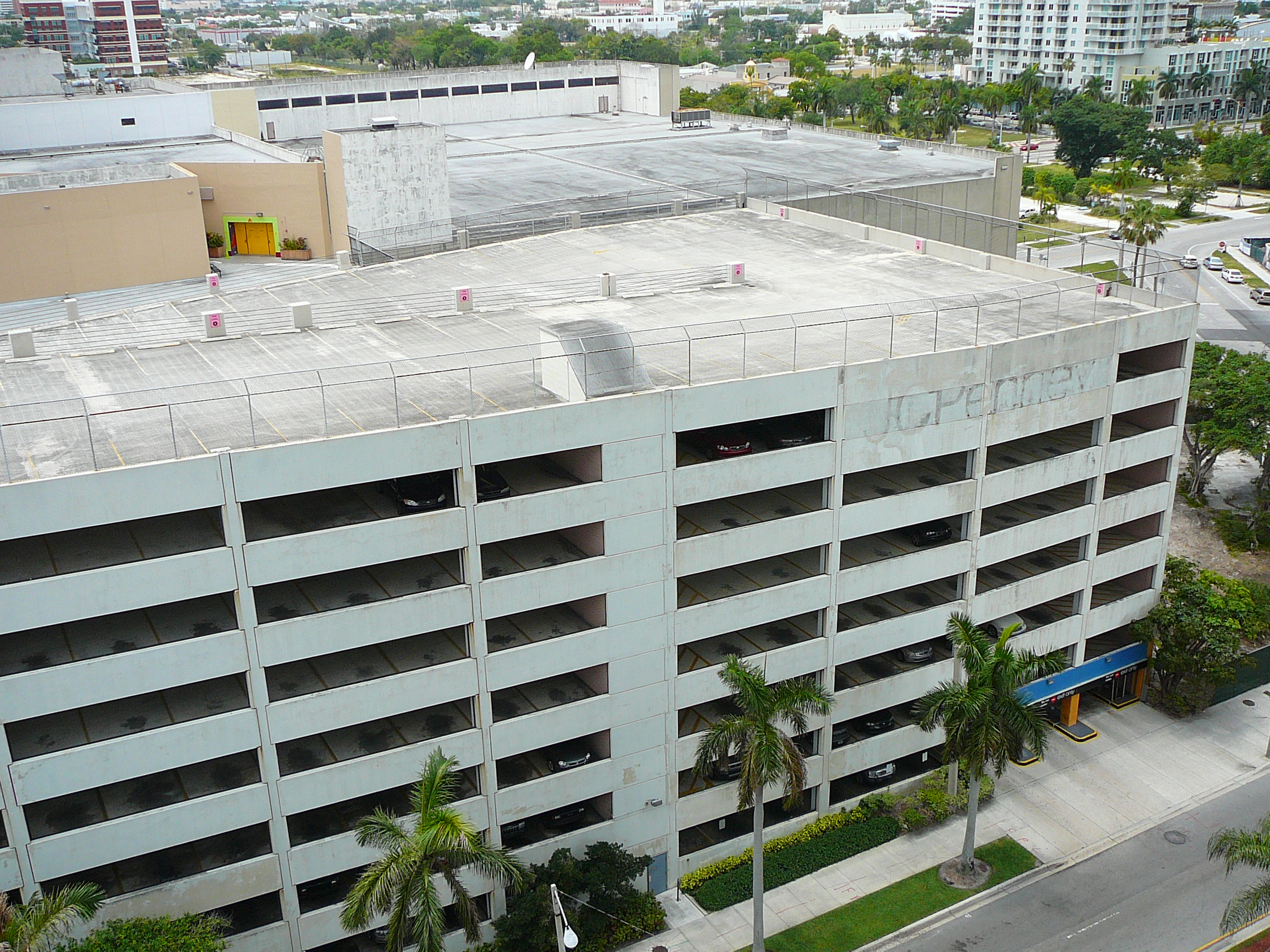
The east side of the old Omni mall parking garage in 2008. The 'JCPenney' label scar can still be seen where the original sign once was.

Omni International Mall was a shopping mall that opened in February 1977 in the northern environs of Downtown Miami's Arts & Entertainment District (then Omni) in Dade County, Florida, United States.

The mall was built in 1977, attached to an existing Jordan Marsh store, with J.C. Penney as the other anchor. It was a mixed-use complex, combining a traditional retail mall with offices and hotel space. Burdines later took over the Jordan Marsh building, closing it in 1992. J.C. Penney closed in 1998. After several years of decreasing sales, the mall closed in 2000, but the adjacent hotel remained open. Part of the mall portion has since been converted to use for Miami International University School of Art & Design. Crystal Cruises took up residence before its bankruptcy. A demolition permit was applied for the old JCPenney section.
