= Opera Tower =

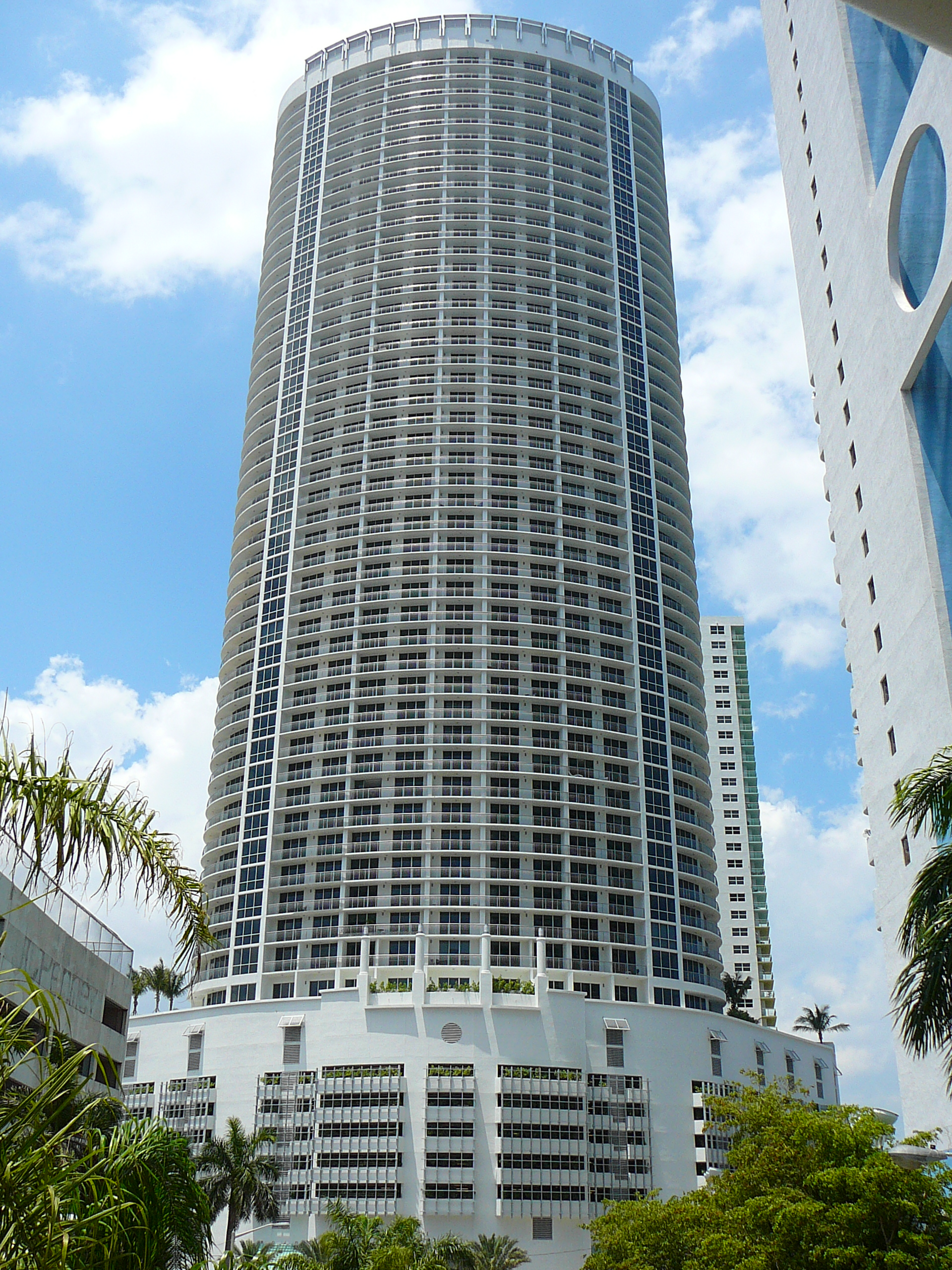
- The Opera Tower in May 2008

General information
- Type: Residential
- Location: 1750 North Bayshore Drive, Miami, Florida, United States
- Coordinates: 25.792453°N 80.187109°W
- Construction started: 2004
- Completed: 2007
- Opening: 2007

Height
- Roof: 543 ft (166 m)

Technical details
- Floor count: 55

Design and construction
- Architect: Corradino Group Architects
- Developer: Florida East Coast Realty

The Opera Tower is a residential skyscraper in Miami, Florida, United States. It was developed by Tibor Hollo's Florida East Coast Realty, and was completed in late 2007. The Opera Tower received its temporary certificate of occupancy on December 26, 2007. The 55-story tower is located at 1750 North Bayshore Drive in Miami's Arts & Entertainment District, just north of Downtown Miami.

Design: The building contains 635 uniquely designed luxury condominiums: studios, one-bedroom and two-bedroom apartments. The building’s elliptical shape gives every residence a wraparound terrace, and the curve widens the views from each unit. Residents look out over Biscayne Bay, South Beach and Downtown Miami. The building is about 0.22 miles from the Adrienne Arsht Center Metromover station.

== See also ==
- List of tallest buildings in Miami
- List of tallest buildings in Florida

== Gallery ==
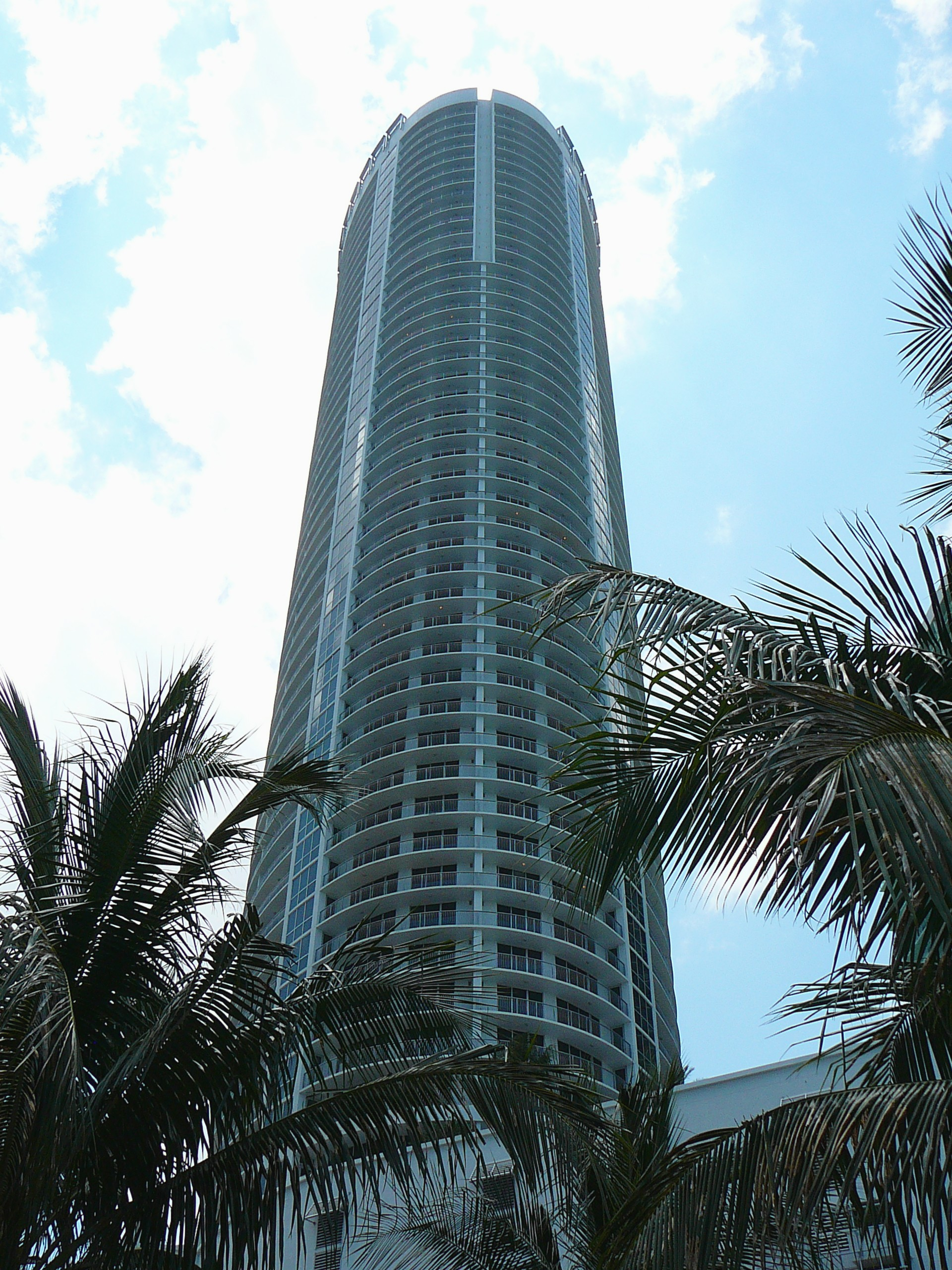
Side view (east) of the Opera Tower

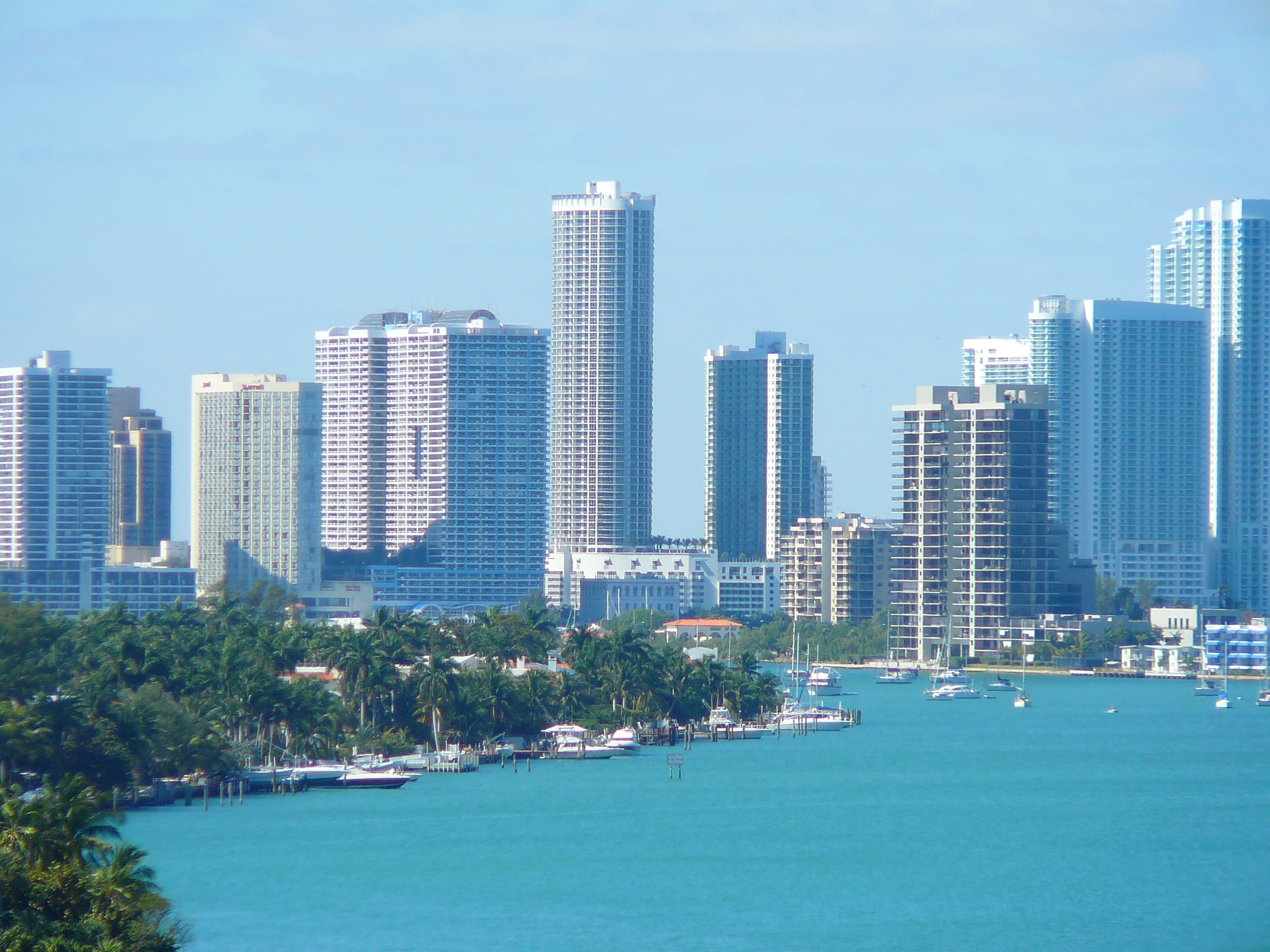
Opera Tower in early 2008 in Midtown Miami

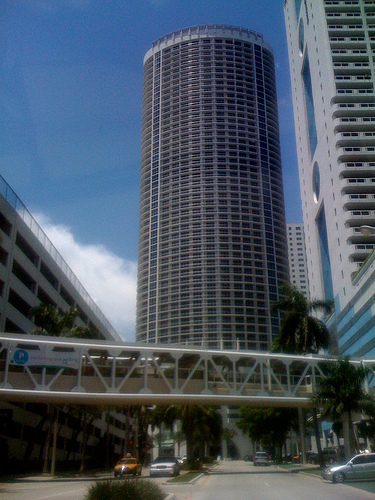
View from the street
