= Miami International Boat Show =

Coordinates: 25.790882°N 80.184779°W

- Genre: Boat show and watersports trade fair
- Venue: Miami Marine Stadium and Bayside Marketplace
- Locations: Miami, Florida, United States
- Inaugurated: 1969
- Organizer: National Marine Manufacturers Association

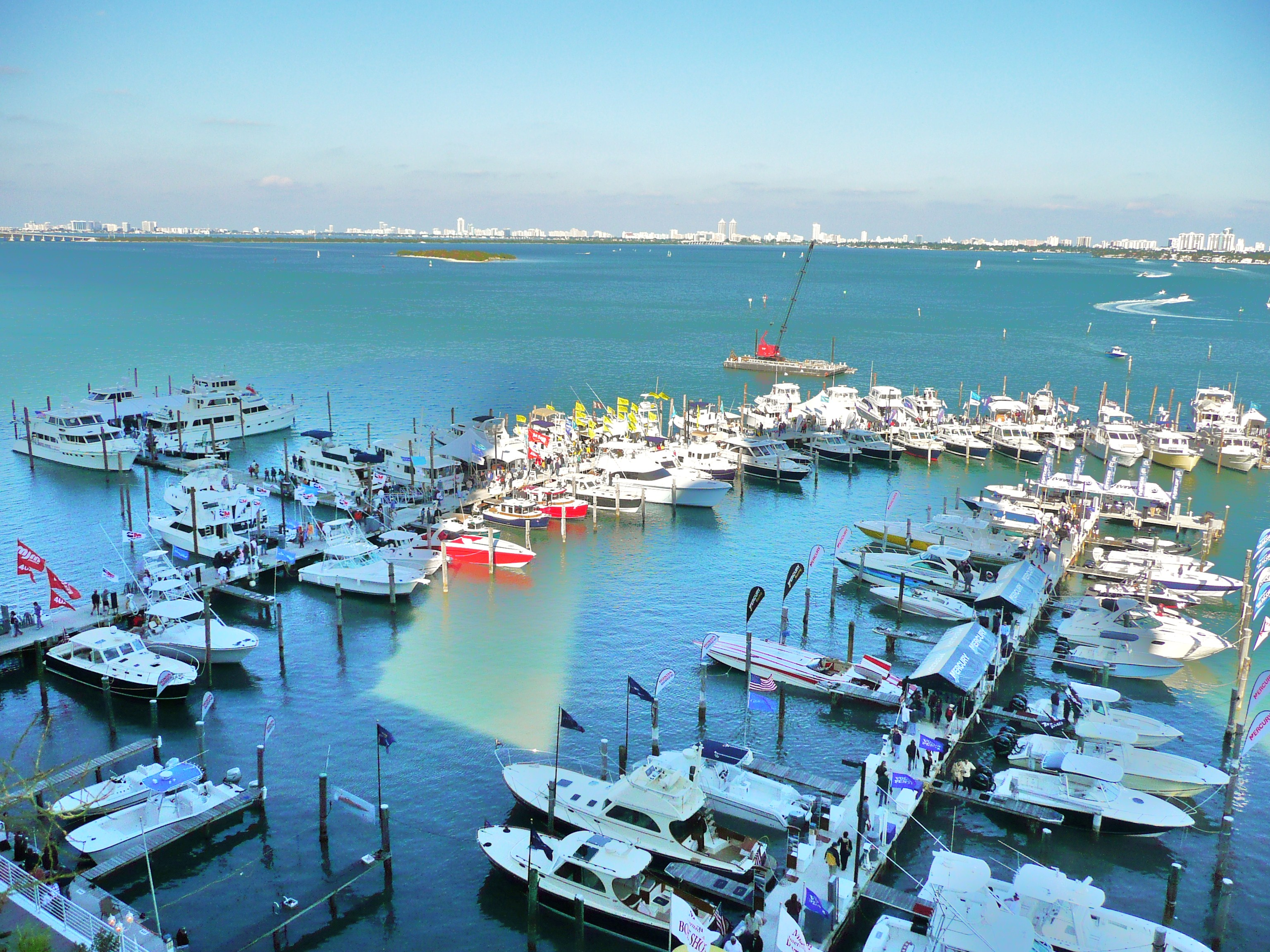
The Sea Isle Marina during the Miami International Boat Show, 2010.

The Miami International Boat Show is an annual event in February, produced by the National Marine Manufacturers Association in Miami, Florida, United States. It had previously been held in three separate venues; two in Downtown Miami, and the other in Miami Beach. In 2016 through 2021 it was held at Miami Marine Stadium Park and Basin on Virginia Key, while Strictly Sail remained at Miamarina at Bayside Marketplace Marina. Over 1,700 companies that are NMMA members, produce more than 80% of the marine products used by recreational boaters and anglers in the United States. The North American pleasure boat market represents fully half of the global demand for these products and services, roughly $39.5 billion annually in just the United States alone.
