= List of tallest buildings in the United States =

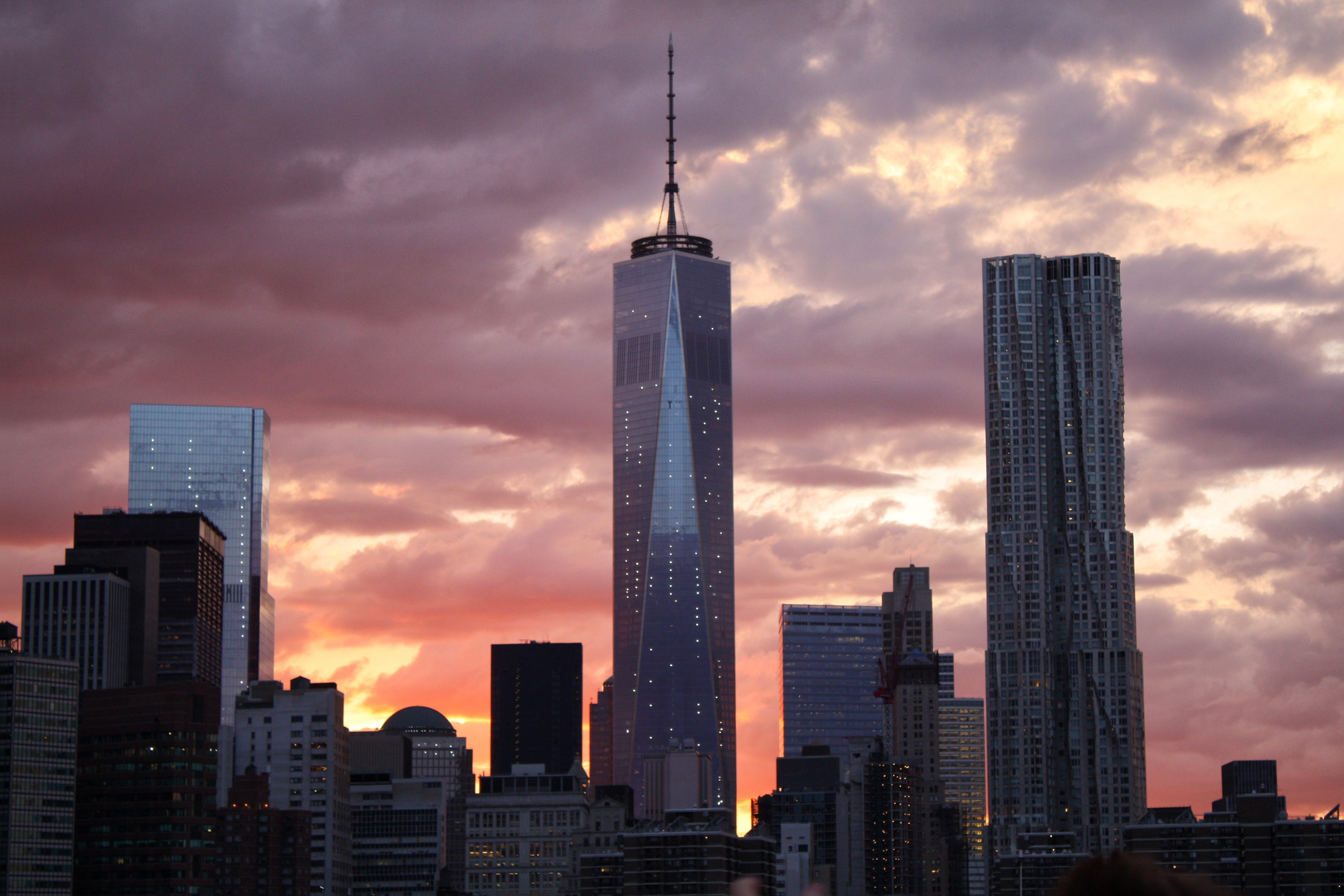
One World Trade Center (center) in New York City is the tallest building in the Western Hemisphere. 8 Spruce Street can be seen on the right.

The world's first skyscraper was built in Chicago in 1885. Since then, the United States has been home to some of the world's tallest skyscrapers. New York City, and especially the borough of Manhattan, has the tallest skyline in the country. Eleven American buildings have held the title of tallest building in the world. New York City and Chicago have been the centers of American skyscraper building. The 10-story Home Insurance Building, built in Chicago in 1885, is regarded as the world's first skyscraper; the building was constructed using a novel steel-loadbearing frame which became a standard of the industry worldwide.

Since its topping out in 2013, One World Trade Center in New York City has been the tallest skyscraper in the United States. Its spire brings the structure to a symbolic architectural height of 1,776 feet (541 m), connoting the year the Declaration of Independence was signed, though the absolute tip (or pinnacle) of the structure is measured at 1,792 feet (546.2 m). However, the observation deck elevation and the height to the highest occupied floor of One World Trade Center are surpassed by Central Park Tower, 432 Park Avenue, 111 West 57th Street, and Chicago's Willis Tower, which was formerly and is still commonly known as Sears Tower. 350 Park Avenue, and 175 Park Avenue, in New York City will also have higher occupied floors and roofs upon their completion.

Prior to the September 11 attacks in New York City, the twin towers of the first World Trade Center occupied the second and third positions on the list below. The North Tower (1 WTC) stood at 1,368 feet (417 m), while the South Tower (2 WTC) was 1,362 feet (415 m) tall, then surpassed only by the Willis Tower at 1,450 feet (442 m). If they were still standing today, they would occupy the ninth and tenth positions on the list below, with their replacement—the new One World Trade Center—being excluded.

There are numerous skyscrapers and supertall buildings both proposed and under construction throughout the country, concentrated in New York City and Miami. 740 Eighth Avenue, in New York City, is currently under construction, as well as the Waldorf Astoria in Miami. In Chicago, work for the Tribune East Tower was tentatively planned to start in February 2024. However, as of 2026, no work has started. Other tall buildings that are proposed include the 1,907-foot-tall (581 m) Legends Tower in Oklahoma City, and the 1,010-foot-tall (310 m) One Bayfront Plaza in Miami.

== Tallest buildings ==
This list ranks the 100 tallest completed and topped-out buildings in the United States based on standard height measurement. This includes spires and architectural details, but excludes antenna masts. The "Year" column indicates the year in which a building was or will be completed.

† Was the tallest building in the United States upon completion
*Topped out but not yet completed

Name	Image	Location	Height ft (m)	Floors	Year	Notes
One World Trade Center †		New York City; 40°42′46.45″N 74°0′47.53″W	1,776 ft (541 m)	94	2013	On May 10, 2013, One World Trade Center became the tallest building in the Western Hemisphere. It is the 7th-tallest building in the world.
Central Park Tower		New York City; 40.7663°N 73.9810°W	1,550 ft (472 m)	98	2020	Also known as the Nordstrom Tower. At 1,550 feet, the tower is the tallest residential building in the world both by roof height and architectural height. Topped out in September 2019, and completed in 2020. It is the tallest building outside Asia by roof height. Tallest building completed in the United States in the 2020s.
Willis Tower †		Chicago; 41°52′43.82″N 87°38′9.73″W	1,450 ft (442 m)	110	1974	Formerly known, and still commonly referred to, as the Sears Tower. It was the tallest building in the world from 1974 until 2003. Tallest building constructed in the world in the 1970s.
111 West 57th Street		New York City; 40.76455°N 73.97765°W	1,428 ft (435 m)	84	2021	Also known as Steinway Tower. It is the world's most slender skyscraper. Topped out in September 2019.
One Vanderbilt		New York City; 40.7530°N 73.9785°W	1,401 ft (427 m)	93	2019	Topped out in September 2019.
432 Park Avenue		New York City; 40°45′40.32″N 73°58′17.4″W	1,396 ft (426 m)	85	2014	Topped out in October 2014. 432 Park Avenue is the 31st-tallest building in the world.
Trump International Hotel and Tower		Chicago; 41°53′19.84″N 87°37′35.18″W	1,388 ft (423 m)	98	2008	33rd-tallest building in the world. Tallest building constructed in the United States in the 2000s.
270 Park Avenue		New York City; 40°45′21″N 73°58′31″W	1,388 ft (423 m)	60	2025	JPMorgan Chase is replacing its headquarters; the new tower was approved by the New York City Council in May 2019. Topped out in November 2023.
30 Hudson Yards		New York City; 40°45′14.3″N 74°00′2.7″W	1,270 ft (387 m)	103	2019	47th-tallest building in the world
Empire State Building †		New York City; 40°44′54.47″N 73°59′8.5″W	1,250 ft (381 m)	102	1931	Tallest building in the world from 1930 until 1971; tallest man-made structure in the world 1931–1967; first building in the world to contain over 100 floors. Tallest building constructed in the world in the 1930s.
Bank of America Tower		New York City; 40°45′19.36″N 73°59′3.92″W	1,200 ft (366 m)	55	2009	9th-tallest building in New York City.
St. Regis Chicago		Chicago; 41°53′14″N 87°37′02″W	1,198 ft (365 m)	101	2019	Topped off April 26, 2019. Third-tallest building in Chicago and the tallest building in the world designed by a woman.
Aon Center		Chicago; 41°53′6.79″N 87°37′17.41″W	1,136 ft (346 m)	83	1972	Formerly known as the Standard Oil Building.
875 North Michigan Avenue		Chicago; 41°53′55.61″N 87°37′22.93″W	1,128 ft (344 m)	100	1968	Formerly known as the John Hancock Center; The first trussed-tube building in the world and contains some of the highest residential units in the world. First supertall skyscraper outside of New York City. Tallest building constructed in the world in the 1960s, and the highest pinnacle height in the world at the time.
Comcast Technology Center		Philadelphia; 39.9549°N 75.1704°W	1,121 ft (342 m)	60	2017	Tallest building in Philadelphia and Pennsylvania. Tallest building outside New York City and Chicago. Topped out on November 27, 2017.
Wilshire Grand Center		Los Angeles; 34°3′0″N 118°15′33.48″W	1,100 ft (335 m)	73	2016	Tallest building in Los Angeles and California, and tallest building west of the Mississippi River. Topped out on September 3, 2016.
3 World Trade Center		New York City; 40°42′39.32″N 74°0′41.79″W	1,079 ft (329 m)	69	2016	Topped out on June 23, 2016.
Salesforce Tower		San Francisco; 37°47′23.8″N 122°23′48.9″W	1,070 ft (326 m)	61	2017	Topped out on April 6, 2017. Tallest building in San Francisco and fourth-tallest building in rooftop height west of Chicago. Second-tallest building west of the Mississippi.
53W53		New York City; 40.76160°N 73.97840°W	1,050 ft (320 m)	77	2019	Construction began in 2014.
Chrysler Building †		New York City; 40°45′5.44″N 73°58′31.84″W	1,046 ft (319 m)	77	1930	Tied for 20th-tallest in the United States. Tallest man-made structure in the world from 1930 until 1931; First building to be more than 1,000 feet tall; tallest brick building in the world.
The New York Times Building		New York City; 40°45′21.77″N 73°59′24.21″W	1,046 ft (319 m)	52	2006	Tied for 21st-tallest in the United States. Also known as the Times Tower. The first high-rise building in the United States to have a ceramic sunscreen curtain wall.
The Brooklyn Tower		New York City; 40°41′25″N 73°58′56″W	1,035 ft (315 m)	74	2021	Topped out in October 2021 to become the tallest building in Brooklyn, the tallest building in the Outer Boroughs, tallest building on Long Island, and the first supertall skyscraper in the state of New York outside Manhattan.
The Spiral		New York City; 40.754801°N 73.999835°W	1,031 ft (314 m)	66	2022	The facade is in resemblance to a spiral.
Waterline*		Austin; 30.261563°N 97.739145°W	1,025 ft (312 m)	74	2026	Proposed in 2020 by Lincoln Property Company and Karoi Residential. Contains residential, office, and hotel levels. Upon topping off in August 2025, it became the tallest building in Texas and the Southern United States, as well as the tallest located in a state capital.
Bank of America Plaza		Atlanta; 33°46′14.9″N 84°23′10.75″W	1,023 ft (312 m)	55	1991	Tallest building in Atlanta and Georgia; tallest building located in a state capital and in the Southern United States until 2025. Tallest building constructed in the United States in the 1990s.
U.S. Bank Tower		Los Angeles; 34°3′3.85″N 118°15′16.03″W	1,018 ft (310 m)	73	1989	Second-tallest building in Los Angeles as well as third-tallest building in California. Tallest building west of the Mississippi River from 1989 to 2017. Tallest building constructed in the world in the 1980s. It was previously the tallest building in the world with a helipad on the roof. It is now third on that list behind China World Trade Center Tower III, and Guangzhou International Finance Center.
Franklin Center		Chicago; 41°52′49.19″N 87°38′5.23″W	1,007 ft (307 m)	62	1989	Originally known as the AT&T Corporate Center at its inauguration in 1989, the name was changed after Tishman Speyer acquired the building and the adjacent USG complex in 2004.
One57		New York City; 40°45′54.73″N 73°58′45″W	1,004 ft (306 m)	90	2014	Tallest mixed-use (residential and hotel) skyscraper in New York City
JPMorgan Chase Tower		Houston; 29°45′34.50″N 95°21′48.44″W	1,002 ft (305 m)	79	1982	Tallest building in Houston, second-tallest in Texas; Second-tallest by rooftop height in the U.S. west of Chicago. Tallest 5-sided building in the world. Tallest building west of the Mississippi River until 1989.
520 Fifth Avenue*		New York City; 40°45′16″N 73°58′50″W	1,002 ft (305 m)	76	2026	Mixed-use building with office space on the lower stories and residences above. The building topped out in October 2024.
35 Hudson Yards		New York City; 40.75455°N 74.00240°W	1,000 ft (305 m)	72	2019	
1 Manhattan West		New York City; 40.7519°N 73.9979°W	996 ft (304 m)	69	2022	
Two Prudential Plaza		Chicago; 41°53′7.43″N 87°37′21.77″W	995 ft (303 m)	69	1989	
Wells Fargo Plaza		Houston; 29°45′30.17″N 95°22′5.81″W	992 ft (302 m)	75	1982	Third-tallest in rooftop height in the U.S. west of Chicago.
50 Hudson Yards		New York City; 40.754578°N 74.000119°W	981 ft (299 m)	58	2022	
4 World Trade Center		New York City; 40°42′37.36″N 74°0′42.88″W	978 ft (298 m)	78	2013	Also known as 150 Greenwich Street
One Chicago East Tower		Chicago; 41°53′46.2″N 87°37′43.6″W	974 ft (297 m)	78	2021	Topped out in July 2021.
Comcast Center		Philadelphia; 39°57′17.21″N 75°10′6.73″W	971 ft (296 m)	60	2008	Second-tallest building in Philadelphia; second-tallest building in Pennsylvania
311 South Wacker Drive		Chicago; 41°52′38.78″N 87°38′8.08″W	961 ft (293 m)	67	1989	Tallest reinforced concrete building in the United States.
70 Pine Street		New York City; 40°42′22.9″N 74°0′26.67″W	952 ft (290 m)	70	1932	Converted into a residential skyscraper with 644 rental residences and 132 hotel rooms
220 Central Park South		New York City; 40.7671°N 73.9802°W	950 ft (290 m)	67	2020	
Cipriani Residences Miami		Miami; 25°45′36″N 80°11′40″W	950 ft (289.6 m)	80	2028	Construction had started after the site's groundbreaking ceremony took place on February 6, 2024. On site of former Capital at Brickell or CCCC Miami site. Topped out in July 2026 as the tallest building in Miami and Florida.
Key Tower		Cleveland; 41°30′3.21″N 81°41′37.14″W	948 ft (289 m)	57	1991	Tallest building in Cleveland and Ohio; tallest building in the Midwestern United States outside of Chicago; tallest building in the United States between New York City and Chicago until the 2007 completion of Comcast Center
One Liberty Place		Philadelphia; 39°57′19.13″N 75°10′8.61″W	945 ft (288 m)	61	1986	First building in Philadelphia constructed taller than Philadelphia City Hall, completed 86 years earlier.
2 Manhattan West		New York City; 40°45′08″N 73°59′53″W	935 ft (285 m)	58	2021	Construction began after law firm Cravath, Swaine & Moore signed a lease for 13 floors in October 2019. Topped out in November 2021.
Columbia Center		Seattle; 47°36′16.93″N 122°19′50.21″W	933 ft (284 m)	76	1985	Tallest building in Seattle and Washington; fourth-tallest building on the West Coast. Tallest observation deck on the West Coast and west of the Mississippi.
40 Wall Street †		New York City; 40°42′25.05″N 74°0′34.73″W	927 ft (283 m)	70	1929	Also known as the Trump Building, it was the tallest building in the world for two months in 1930 until the completion of the Chrysler Building.
Four Seasons Hotel New York Downtown		New York City; 40°42′47.40″N 74°00′33.52″W	926 ft (282 m)	67	2016	Topped out on March 31, 2015.
Bank of America Plaza		Dallas; 32°46′48″N 96°48′14.47″W	921 ft (281 m)	72	1985	Tallest building in Dallas
Citigroup Center		New York City; 40°45′29.98″N 73°58′11.99″W	915 ft (279 m)	59	1976	
15 Hudson Yards		New York City; 40.7546°N 74.003°W	914 ft (279 m)	70	2018	Topped out in February 2018.
125 Greenwich Street*		New York City; 40.709167°N 74.012778°W	912 ft (278 m)	72	2022	Revised down from earlier projected height. Topped out in March 2019.
Williams Tower		Houston; 29°44′13.69″N 95°27′40.6″W	901 ft (275 m)	66	1982	Known as the Transco Tower from 1982 to 1999. Tallest skyscraper in the United States outside of a city's central business district.
NEMA Chicago		Chicago	896 ft (273 m)	76	2019	
99 Hudson Street		Jersey City; 40°42′55″N 74°02′06″W	889 ft (271 m)	79	2019	Tallest building in New Jersey since 2019.
Renaissance Tower		Dallas; 32°46′52.12″N 96°48′6.68″W	886 ft (270 m)	58	1974	Originally constructed at a height of 710 feet (216 m); rooftop spires were added in 1987, increasing the building's structural height to 886 feet (270 m).
10 Hudson Yards		New York City; 40°45′9″N 74°0′3.78″W	878 ft (268 m)	52	2016	Topped out in October 2015.
400 Lake Shore Drive North Tower		Chicago; 41°53′24″N 87°36′54″W	877 ft (267 m)	72	2027	Part of a two tower project, built on the site of the proposed Chicago Spire. Approved on December 14, 2020. Groundbreaking ceremony was held in June 2024. Construction reached 38th floor in July 2025. Topped off in April 2026.
Sixth and Guadalupe		Austin; 30°16′10.06″N 97°44′47.86″W	875 ft (267 m)	66	2023	Topped out in November 2022.
Truist Plaza		Atlanta; 33°45′45.53″N 84°23′11.48″W	871 ft (265 m)	60	1991	
Bank of America Corporate Center		Charlotte; 35°13′37.89″N 80°50′32.24″W	871 ft (265 m)	62	1991	Tallest building in Charlotte and the Carolinas; Tallest building in the Southern United States outside of Atlanta or Texas.
8 Spruce Street		New York City; 40°42′39″N 74°00′20″W	870 ft (265 m)	76	2011	Also known as Beekman Tower and New York by Gehry.
900 North Michigan		Chicago; 41°53′58.65″N 87°37′29.46″W	869 ft (265 m)	66	1988	
Panorama Tower		Miami; 25.76335°N 80.19134°W	868 ft (265 m)	85	2017	Tallest building in Miami and the state of Florida from 2017 to 2026.
Trump World Tower		New York City; 40°45′8.98″N 73°58′4.48″W	861 ft (262 m)	74	2001	Tallest all residential building in the world from 2001 until 2003
425 Park Avenue		New York City; 40.760542°N 73.971157°W	860 ft (262 m)	47	2018	Topped out in December 2018.
262 Fifth Avenue		New York City	860 ft (262 m)	56	2024	Topped out in April 2024. Upon opening, the building will yield 26 condominium units.
Water Tower Place		Chicago; 41°53′52.62″N 87°37′22.86″W	859 ft (262 m)	74	1976	
Aqua		Chicago; 41°53′11.01″N 87°37′12.12″W	859 ft (262 m)	87	2010	Formerly tallest building in the world designed by a woman.
Aon Center		Los Angeles; 34°2′57.22″N 118°15′25.07″W	858 ft (262 m)	62	1972	Tallest building in the United States west of the Mississippi River from 1973 until 1982. Tallest in Los Angeles from 1972 until 1989.
Transamerica Pyramid		San Francisco; 37°47′42.4″N 122°24′10.01″W	853 ft (260 m)	48	1972	2nd-tallest building in San Francisco. Tallest in San Francisco from 1972 until 2017; tallest building in the U.S. west of the Mississippi River from 1972 until 1974
30 Rockefeller Plaza		New York City; 40°45′32.11″N 73°58′45.65″W	850 ft (259 m)	70	1932	
Chase Tower		Chicago; 41°52′53.59″N 87°37′48.58″W	850 ft (259 m)	61	1969	
Two Liberty Place		Philadelphia; 39°57′6.07″N 75°10′2.76″W	848 ft (258 m)	58	1989	
Baccarat Residences	–	Miami; 25°46′09″N 80°11′26″W	848 ft (258 m)	75	2028	Archaeologists discovered human remains and artifacts at the site in 2021. Construction on the site has been paused so archaeologists can conduct a dig, but construction commenced on October 30, 2023 after a groundbreaking ceremony took place on the site. Construction topped out in Q4 2026.
One Manhattan Square		New York City; 40.710394°N 73.991388°W	847 ft (258 m)	73	2019	
Rainier Square Tower		Seattle	847 ft (258 m)	58	2020	Proposed by Urban Visions and designed by NBBJ. Approved in 2015.
Sutton 58		New York City	847 ft (258 m)	67	2022	Residential tower rising in Sutton Place, also known as 3 Sutton Place.
Park Tower		Chicago; 41°53′49.19″N 87°37′30.56″W	844 ft (257 m)	70	1999	
Devon Energy Center		Oklahoma City; 35°28′0.02″N 97°31′3.47″W	844 ft (257 m)	52	2012	Tallest building in Oklahoma City; tallest building in Oklahoma; tallest building in the "Plains States"
One Bennett Park		Chicago; 41°53′49.19″N 87°37′30.56″W	844 ft (257 m)	67	2019	
U.S. Steel Tower		Pittsburgh; 40°26′28.6″N 79°59′40.79″W	841 ft (256 m)	64	1969	Tallest building in Pittsburgh; largest roof in the world at its height or taller
Salesforce Tower Chicago		Chicago; 41°53′15.4″N 87°38′15.7″W	835 ft (255 m)	60	2023	Formerly known as Wolf Point South Tower.
56 Leonard Street		New York City; 40°43′4.09″N 74°0′23.82″W	821 ft (250 m)	60	2015	Topped out in July 2015.
Aston Martin Residences		Miami; 25.77077°N 80.18785°W	821 ft (250 m)	66	2022	Residential building in Miami under the Aston Martin brand name.
One Atlantic Center		Atlanta; 33°47′13.13″N 84°23′14.63″W	820 ft (250 m)	50	1986	Also known as the IBM Tower. Tallest in Atlanta from 1986 until 1991.
110 North Wacker		Chicago; 41°53′01.4″N 87°38′14.7″W	817 ft (249 m)	58	2021	
CitySpire Center		New York City; 40°45′50.97″N 73°58′47.11″W	814 ft (248 m)	77	1986	
28 Liberty Street		New York City; 40°42′28.36″N 74°0′31.81″W	813 ft (248 m)	65	1961	Known until sale in 2015 as One Chase Manhattan Plaza
The Orchard		New York City; 40°44′52.8″N 73°56′21.12″W	811 ft (247 m)	69	2024	Tallest building in Queens, New York. Topped out in July 2024.
4 Times Square		New York City; 40°45′21.37″N 73°59′8.9″W	809 ft (247 m)	50	1999	Formerly known as the Condé Nast Building
MetLife Building		New York City; 40°45′12.45″N 73°58′35.49″W	808 ft (246 m)	59	1962	Formerly known as the Pan Am Building
731 Lexington Avenue		New York City; 40°45′42.06″N 73°58′5.1″W	806 ft (246 m)	57	2004	Also known as Bloomberg Tower.
1000M		Chicago; 41°52′10.56″N 87°37′27.8″W	805 ft (245 m)	73	2023	Approved April 21, 2016. Topped out in July 2023.
126 Madison Avenue		New York City; 40°44′58.5″N 73°59′6.6″W	805 ft (245 m)	56	2022	Tallest residential building in the NoMad neighborhood of Manhattan.
The Centrale		New York City; 40°45′32.8″N 73°58′17.4″W	803 ft (245 m)	64	2019	Residential tower on East 50th Street designed by Pelli Clarke Pelli Architects.
181 Fremont		San Francisco; 37°47′22.92″N 122°23′43.26″W	802 ft (244 m)	66	2018	2nd-tallest mixed-use residential building west of the Mississippi River.
Woolworth Building †		New York City; 40°42′43″N 74°0′31″W	792 ft (241 m)	58	1913	Tallest building in the world from 1913 to 1930.
IDS Center		Minneapolis; 44°58′36″N 93°16′14″W	792 ft (241 m)	55	1971	Tallest building in Minneapolis and in the state of Minnesota.
BNY Mellon Center		Philadelphia; 39°57′10.4″N 75°10′2.6″W	791 ft (241 m)	54	1989	Formerly known as Mellon Bank Center.
200 Clarendon Street		Boston; 42°20′54″N 71°4′33″W	790 ft (241 m)	60	1971	Formerly known as the John Hancock Tower; tallest building in New England.

== Tallest buildings by pinnacle height ==
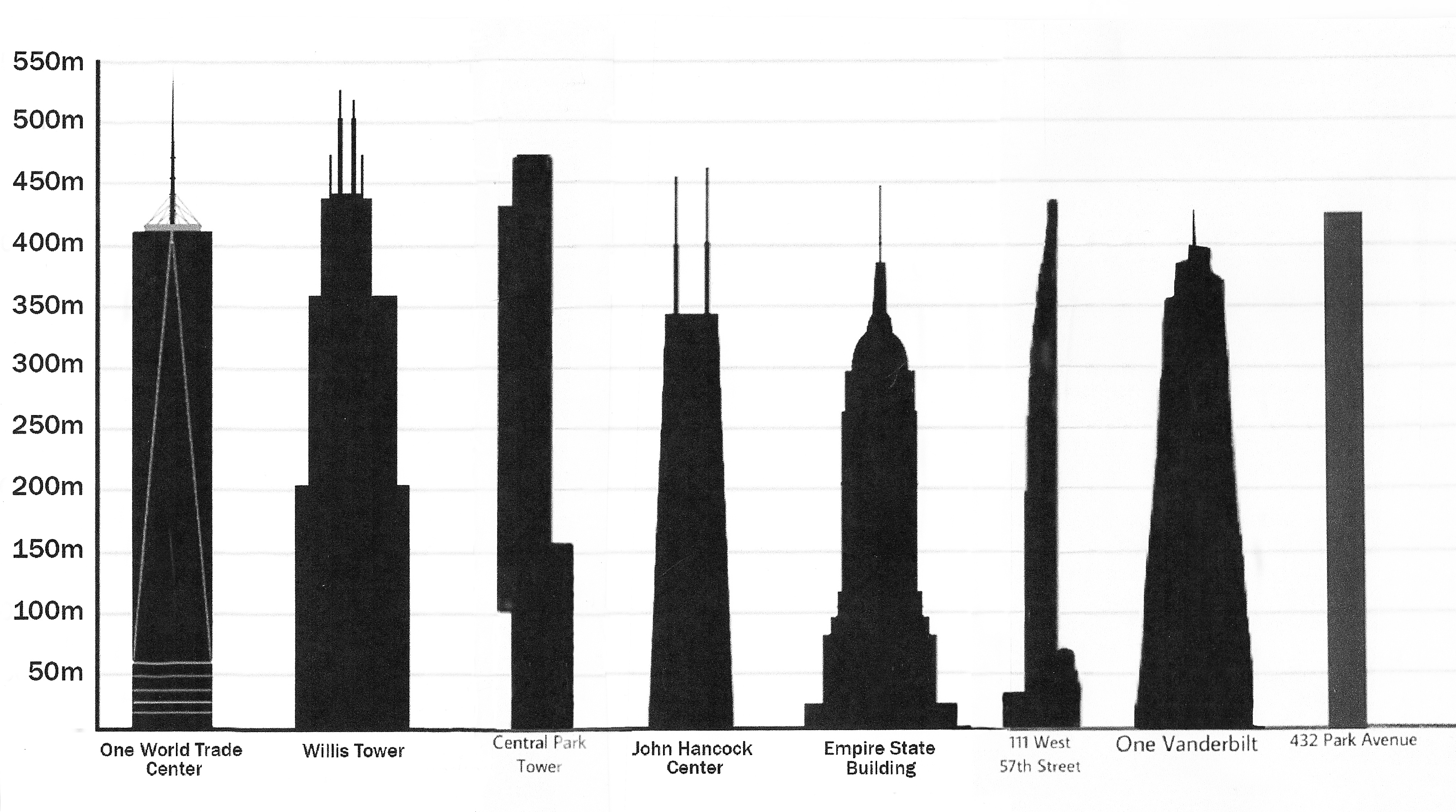
Tallest buildings in the United States by pinnacle height, including all antennas, poles, whether architectural or not as of 2020

This lists ranks completed and topped out buildings in the United States that stand at least 800 feet (244 m) tall based on pinnacle height measurement, which includes antenna masts. Standard architectural height measurement, which excludes antennas in building height, is included for comparative purposes.

Name	City	Pinnacle height ft (m)	Architectural height ft (m)	Reference
One World Trade Center	New York City	1,792 ft (546 m)	1,776 ft (541 m)	
Willis Tower	Chicago	1,729 ft (527 m)	1,451 ft (442 m)	
Central Park Tower	New York City	1,550 ft (472 m)	1,550 ft (472 m)	
John Hancock Center	Chicago	1,500 ft (457 m)	1,127 ft (344 m)	
Empire State Building	New York City	1,454 ft (443 m)	1,250 ft (381 m)	
111 West 57th Street	New York City	1,428 ft (435 m)	1,428 ft (435 m)	
One Vanderbilt	New York City	1,401 ft (427 m)	1,401 ft (427 m)	
432 Park Avenue	New York City	1,396 ft (426 m)	1,396 ft (426 m)	
Trump International Hotel and Tower	Chicago	1,388 ft (423 m)	1,388 ft (423 m)	
270 Park Avenue	New York City	1,388 ft (423 m)	1,388 ft (423 m)	
30 Hudson Yards	New York City	1,268 ft (386 m)	1,268 ft (386 m)	
Bank of America Tower	New York City	1,200 ft (366 m)	1,200 ft (366 m)	
St. Regis Chicago	Chicago	1,191 ft (363 m)	1,191 ft (363 m)	
Aon Center	Chicago	1,136 ft (346 m)	1,136 ft (346 m)	
Comcast Technology Center	Philadelphia	1,121 ft (342 m)	1,121 ft (342 m)	
Condé Nast Building	New York City	1,118 ft (341 m)	809 ft (247 m)	
Wilshire Grand Center	Los Angeles	1,100 ft (335 m)	928 ft (283 m)	
3 World Trade Center	New York City	1,079 ft (329 m)	1,079 ft (329 m)	
Salesforce Tower	San Francisco	1,070 ft (326 m)	1,070 ft (326 m)	
9 DeKalb Avenue	New York City	1,066 ft (325 m)	1,066 ft (325 m)	
Chrysler Building	New York City	1,046 ft (319 m)	1,046 ft (319 m)	
The New York Times Building	New York City	1,046 ft (319 m)	1,046 ft (319 m)	
The Spiral	New York City	1,031 ft (314 m)	1,031 ft (314 m)	
Waterline	Austin	1,025 ft (312 m)	1,025 ft (312 m)	
Bank of America Plaza	Atlanta	1,023 ft (312 m)	1,023 ft (312 m)	
U.S. Bank Tower	Los Angeles	1,018 ft (310 m)	1,018 ft (310 m)	
Franklin Center	Chicago	1,007 ft (307 m)	886 ft (270 m)	
One57	New York City	1,005 ft (306 m)	1,005 ft (306 m)	
JPMorgan Chase Tower	Houston	1,002 ft (305 m)	1,002 ft (305 m)	
520 Fifth Avenue	New York City	1,001 ft (305 m)	1,001 ft (305 m)	
One Shell Plaza	Houston	1,000 ft (305 m)	714 ft (218 m)	
Two Prudential Plaza	Chicago	995 ft (303 m)	995 ft (303 m)	
Wells Fargo Bank Plaza	Houston	992 ft (302 m)	992 ft (302 m)	
Four World Trade Center	New York City	977 ft (298 m)	977 ft (298 m)	
Comcast Center	Philadelphia	975 ft (297 m)	975 ft (297 m)	
One Chicago East Tower	Chicago	971 ft (296 m)	971 ft (296 m)	
Columbia Center	Seattle	967 ft (295 m)	967 ft (295 m)	
311 South Wacker Drive	Chicago	961 ft (293 m)	961 ft (293 m)	
70 Pine Street	New York City	952 ft (290 m)	952 ft (290 m)	
Cipriani Residences Miami	Miami	950 ft (290 m)	950 ft (290 m)	
Key Tower	Cleveland	947 ft (289 m)	947 ft (289 m)	
One Liberty Place	Philadelphia	945 ft (288 m)	945 ft (288 m)	
Bloomberg Tower	New York City	941 ft (287 m)	806 ft (246 m)	
The Trump Building	New York City	927 ft (283 m)	927 ft (283 m)	
Bank of America Plaza	Dallas	921 ft (281 m)	921 ft (281 m)	
Citigroup Center	New York City	915 ft (279 m)	915 ft (279 m)	
One Prudential Plaza	Chicago	912 ft (278 m)	601 ft (183 m)	
IDS Center	Minneapolis	910 ft (277 m)	792 ft (241 m)	
Prudential Tower	Boston	907 ft (276 m)	749 ft (228 m)	
Truist Plaza	Atlanta	902 ft (275 m)	871 ft (265 m)	
Williams Tower	Houston	901 ft (275 m)	901 ft (275 m)	
Renaissance Tower	Dallas	886 ft (270 m)	886 ft (270 m)	
Westin Peachtree Plaza Hotel	Atlanta	883 ft (269 m)	723 ft (220 m)	
400 Lake Shore Drive North Tower	Chicago	877 ft (267 m)	877 ft (267 m)	
900 North Michigan	Chicago	871 ft (265 m)	871 ft (265 m)	
Bank of America Corporate Center	Charlotte	871 ft (265 m)	871 ft (265 m)	
8 Spruce Street	New York City	870 ft (265 m)	870 ft (265 m)	
Panorama Tower	Miami	868 ft (265 m)	868 ft (265 m)	
Trump World Tower	New York City	860 ft (262 m)	860 ft (262 m)	
262 Fifth Avenue	New York City	860 ft (262 m)	860 ft (262 m)	
Water Tower Place	Chicago	859 ft (262 m)	859 ft (262 m)	
Aqua	Chicago	859 ft (262 m)	859 ft (262 m)	
Aon Center	Los Angeles	858 ft (262 m)	858 ft (262 m)	
Transamerica Pyramid	San Francisco	853 ft (260 m)	853 ft (260 m)	
Comcast Building	New York City	850 ft (259 m)	850 ft (259 m)	
Chase Tower	Chicago	850 ft (259 m)	850 ft (259 m)	
Two Liberty Place	Philadelphia	848 ft (258 m)	848 ft (258 m)	
Baccarat Residences	Miami	848 ft (258 m)	848 ft (258 m)	
Park Tower	Chicago	844 ft (257 m)	844 ft (257 m)	
U.S. Steel Tower	Pittsburgh	841 ft (256 m)	841 ft (256 m)	
Salesforce Tower Chicago	Chicago	835 ft (255 m)	835 ft (255 m)	
56 Leonard Street	New York City	821 ft (250 m)	821 ft (250 m)	
Aston Martin Residences	Miami	821 ft (250 m)	821 ft (250 m)	
One Atlantic Center	Atlanta	820 ft (250 m)	820 ft (250 m)	
The Legacy at Millennium Park	Chicago	819 ft (250 m)	819 ft (250 m)	
110 North Wacker	Chicago	817 ft (249 m)	817 ft (249 m)	
CitySpire Center	New York City	814 ft (248 m)	814 ft (248 m)	
One Chase Manhattan Plaza	New York City	813 ft (248 m)	813 ft (248 m)	
The Orchard	New York City	811 ft (247 m)	811 ft (247 m)	
Salesforce Tower	Indianapolis	811 ft (247 m)	700 ft (213 m)	
MetLife Building	New York City	808 ft (246 m)	808 ft (246 m)	

Indicates building is still under construction, but has been topped out.

== Cities with the most skyscrapers ==
American cities with at least five completed skyscrapers over 500 feet (152 meters) high as of November 2026.

City	≥1,000 ft (305 m)	900–999 ft (274–304 m)	800–899 ft (244–274 m)	700–799 ft (213–244 m)	600–699 ft (183–213 m)	500–599 ft (152–183 m)	Total	Ref
New York City	18	11	18	40	69	150	306	
Chicago	6	3	12	9	28	71	129	
Miami	0	1	3	5	23	44	76	
Houston	1	2	0	9	8	20	40	
Los Angeles	2	0	1	6	12	16	37	
San Francisco	1	0	2	2	6	13	24	
Boston	0	0	0	3	7	13	23	
Jersey City	0	1	0	5	4	13	23	
Seattle	0	1	1	3	3	13	21	
Dallas	0	1	1	3	6	9	20	
Atlanta	1	0	2	3	6	6	18	
Austin	1	0	1	1	5	10	18	
Las Vegas	0	0	0	1	9	7	17	
Sunny Isles Beach	0	0	0	0	9	8	17	
Philadelphia	1	2	1	3	3	6	16	
Pittsburgh	0	0	1	1	3	5	10	
Minneapolis	0	0	0	3	1	6	10	
Charlotte	0	0	1	1	3	3	8	
Denver	0	0	0	2	3	3	8	
Detroit	0	0	0	1	2	5	8	
Cleveland	0	1	0	1	2	1	5	
Columbus	0	0	0	0	1	4	5	
Tampa	0	0	0	0	0	5	5	

== Tallest buildings under construction, approved and proposed ==
=== Under construction ===
This lists buildings that are under construction in the United States and are planned to rise at least 800 feet (244 m). Buildings that have already been topped out are excluded.

Name	Location	Height ft (m)	Floors	Year* (est.)	Notes
2 World Trade Center	New York City	1,230 ft (375 m)	62	2031	Will become the second-tallest building in the World Trade Center complex upon completion. In 2026, American Express announced that it would develop and occupy a new headquarters tower on the site, with construction scheduled to begin that year and completion expected in 2031. When completed, it will become the 65th tallest in the world, as well as 11th in the United States.
41-47 West 57th Street	New York City	1,100 ft (335 m)	63	2026	Proposed by developer Sedesco with a design by OMA. Demolition work was completed on the site as of August 2021. Construction reportedly began in 2023.
740 Eighth Avenue	New York City	1,067 ft (325 m)	52	2027	Approved by the city in December 2021. Excavation underway as of October 2022. Plans call for a hotel, with a "vertical-drop" ride and observation tower.
Waldorf Astoria Miami	Miami	1,050 ft (320 m)	100	2027	Announced in 2015. When completed, it would be the tallest in Miami, the state of Florida, and the Southern United States, as well as tied for 19th in the United States with 53W53. Construction commenced after the groundbreaking ceremony in October 2022.
3 Hudson Boulevard	New York City	987 ft (301 m)	56	On hold	Formerly known as GiraSole. When completed, it will be the 32nd tallest in the United States.
Okan Tower	Miami	926 ft (282 m)	70	2026	Will contain 149 condominiums and be one of Miami's tallest buildings when completed. Construction plans have resumed after being suspended due to the COVID-19 pandemic. When completed, it will be the 45th tallest in the United States, as well as the tallest in Miami if completed before the Waldorf Astoria.
Oceanwide Center, Tower 1	San Francisco	905 ft (276 m)	75	On hold	Will be the second-tallest building in San Francisco once completed, only behind the Salesforce Tower. Construction started December 2016. When completed, it will be the 49th tallest in the United States.
1428 Brickell	Miami	861 ft (262 m)	71	2027	189-unit luxury building will also be the world's the first residential high-rise in the world partially powered by the sun, the developer says, with 500 photovoltaic-integrated windows.
343 Madison Avenue	New York City	844 ft (257 m)	49	2029	Under-construction office tower developed by Boston Properties to replace the former Metropolitan Transportation Authority headquarters across from Grand Central Terminal.
80 Flatbush	Brooklyn, New York City	840 ft (256 m)	74	2027	Approved by the New York City Council in September 2018. The development will have two buildings; excavation on the site of the shorter building began in late 2021. When completed, it will become the 76th tallest in the United States.

* Table entries with dashes (—) indicate that information regarding building dates of completion has not yet been released.

=== Approved and proposed ===
This is a list of buildings that are proposed for construction in the United States and are planned to rise at least 800 feet (244 m). A floor count of 50 stories is used as the cutoff for buildings whose heights have not yet been released by their developers.

Name	City	Height ft (m)	Floors	Year (est.)	Notes
Legends Tower	Oklahoma City	1,907 ft (581 m)	134	2030	Designed by AO for developer Scot Matteson, it is part of the Boardwalk at Bricktown complex, which is planned to have 1,528 apartments, 85 condominiums, a 480-room Dream Hotel, restaurants, and shops. If built, it would become the tallest in the United States and Western Hemisphere, as well as the 6th tallest in the world. Construction is expected to begin in 2025.
350 Park Avenue	New York City	1,600 ft (488 m)	62	2032	350 Park Avenue is designed by Foster and Partners and is to be developed by Vornado Realty Trust and Rudin Management. The original proposal reached 1,500 feet and had a slanted look, but the overall design was significantly altered in 2023. The lot is currently occupied by a 30 story mid-century office tower. In December 2023, the developers bought the air rights from the Roman Catholic Archdiocese of New York. If built, it would become tied for 13th tallest in the world, as well as 2nd tallest in the Western Hemisphere.
175 Park Avenue	New York City	1,581 ft (482 m)	86	2030	An Environmental Assessment Statement for 109 East 42nd Street in Midtown East reveals details for a proposed development called Project Commodore, a 1,581-foot-tall skyscraper on the site currently occupied by Grand Hyatt New York. It will be designed by Skidmore, Owings & Merrill. If built, it would become the 14th tallest building in the world, as well as 2nd tallest building in the Western Hemisphere.
Tower Fifth	New York City	1,556 ft (474 m)	96	2025	Tower Fifth is a slender office tower proposed by 432 Park Avenue developer Harry B. Macklowe of Macklowe Properties. If built, it would become the 15th tallest in the world, as well as 2nd tallest in the Western Hemisphere.
Tribune East Tower	Chicago	1,442 ft (440 m)	118	2027	Would become the second-tallest building in Chicago upon completion. Construction is supposed to start in February 2024. If built, it would become the 28th tallest building in the world, as well as 4th tallest in the United States, and 2nd tallest in Chicago.
Hudson Yards Phase II – Tower B	New York City	1,376 ft (419 m)	74	2030	
265 West 45th Street	New York City	1,312 ft (400 m)	96	—	Redevelopment of a Midtown address for a possible supertall office building. As of 2024, there have not been any new developments in years. If built, it would become the 42nd tallest in the world, as well as 8th tallest in the United States.
15 Penn Plaza	New York City	1,270 ft (387 m)	56	—	Designed by Foster and Partners and developed by Vornado Realty Trust, the design of the building has changed several times over the years. Built on the site of the former Hotel Pennsylvania, which was demolished in July 2023. If built, it would become tied for 47th tallest in the world with 30 Hudson Yards, as well as tied for 8th tallest in the United States.
77 Beale Street	San Francisco	1,225 ft (373 m)	76	—	Proposed in July 2025 by Hines. If built, it would become the tallest building in San Francisco, 155 feet taller than the Salesforce Tower. It would also be the tallest building in the United States outside of New York City or Chicago.
2901 Arch Street - Transit Terminal Tower	Philadelphia	1,200 ft (366 m)	85	—	Proposed office and retail as part of the 30th Street Station District redevelopment centered around 30th Street Station. If built, it would become tied for 65th tallest in the world with Bank of America Tower, as well as tied for 10th in the United States, and tallest in Philadelphia.
Hudson Yards Phase II	New York City	1,172 ft (357 m)	80	2030	
3101 Market Street	Philadelphia	1,095 ft (334 m)	70	2025	Proposed residential, office, education, and retail space, part of Schuylkill Yards If built, it would become the 16th tallest in the United States, as well as 2nd tallest in Philadelphia.
609 Brickell	Miami	1,049 ft (320 m)	80	2025	Developing next to the site of a historic church, as of March 2023 the existing church agreed to have the development. If built, it would become the 20th tallest in the United States, as well as tallest in Miami.
888 Brickell	Miami	1,049 ft (320 m)	82	—	Developed by JDS Development Group. Originally referred to as "Major".
One Bayfront Plaza	Miami	1,049 ft (320 m)	93	2026	Announced in 2010. One Bayfront Plaza would be the tallest office tower in Miami and Florida
The Towers by Foster + Partners/Citadel HQ	Miami	1,044 ft (318 m)	81 & 79	—	Project revived in the mid 2010s. Multiple sites later purchased by Citadel Group for construction of a new headquarters.
4/C	Seattle	1,020 ft (311 m)	90	—	Proposed in September 2015 by Crescent Heights, and designed by LMN Architects In 2023, the height of the tower was cut by 164 feet, and the architect was replaced with Skidmore, Owings & Merill. If built, it would become the 24th tallest in the United States, as well as tallest in Seattle.
247 Cherry	New York City	1,013 ft (309 m)	79	—	SHoP Architects building being developed by JDS Development Group. Initial plans revealed in April 2016 and approved by the City Planning Commission in December 2018. If built, it would become the 25th tallest in the United States.
Figueroa Centre	Los Angeles	975 ft (297 m)	66	—	Proposed residential, hotel, and office Tower designed by CallisonRTKL. If built, it would become the 34th tallest in The United States. as well as becoming 4th tallest in California, and 3rd in Los Angeles.
Lakeshore East Building I	Chicago	950 ft (290 m)	85	2026	Part of the Lakeshore East development. If built, it would become the 39th tallest in the United States, as well as 10th in Chicago.
Angels Landing Tower 1	Los Angeles	854 ft (260 m)	64	2028	Proposed Residential and office Tower designed by Peebles, MacFarlane, and Claridge Properties. In 2023, the city approved the development. If built, it would become the 65th tallest in the United States, as well as 5th tallest in California, and 4th in Los Angeles.
Olympia Tower 1	Los Angeles	853 ft (260 m)	65	—	Part of a proposed 3 tower complex. As of 2023, the developer is fighting over taxes. If built, it would become tied for 65th tallest building in the United States with Transamerica Pyramid, as well as tied for 5th in California, and 4th tallest in Los Angeles.
Supertower A	Miami	848 ft (258 m)	83	—	Approved in 2022 If built, it would become tied for 68th tallest with Two Liberty Place, as well as becoming 6th tallest in California, and 4th in Los Angeles.
Supertower B	Miami	848 ft (258 m)	83	—	Approved in 2022 If built, it would become tied for 68th tallest with Two Liberty Place, as well as becoming 6th tallest in California, and 4th in Los Angeles.
4th & Brazos	Austin	823 ft (251 m)	65	2025	If built, it would become the 77th tallest in the United States, as well as 7th tallest in Texas, and 2nd in Austin.
1045 S. Olive Street	Los Angeles	810 ft (247 m)	70	—	Approved in 2021 If built, it would become the 84th tallest in the United States, as well as 6th tallest in California, and 4th in Los Angeles.
Transbay Parcel F	San Francisco	806 ft (246 m)	64	—	In 2023, the site was put up for sale by the developer. If built, it would become tied for 85th tallest in the United States with 731 Lexington Avenue, as well as 6th tallest in California, and 3rd tallest in San Francisco.
30 Journal Square	Jersey City	800 ft (244 m)	72	—	Approved in August 2016. Developer granted 5 year extension in 2022. If built, it would become the 89th tallest building in the United States, as well as 2nd tallest in both New Jersey and Jersey City.

* Table entries with dashes (—) indicate that information regarding building heights, floor counts or dates of completion has not yet been released.

== Tallest destroyed ==
This table lists the 10 tallest buildings in the United States that have been demolished, destroyed, or are undergoing demolition.

† Was the world's tallest building upon completion

Name	Image	City	Height ft (m)	Floors	Year completed	Year demolished	Notes
1 World Trade Center †	Aerial view of two 110-story twin towers; the building have gray, steel exteriors, and the structure on the left is topped by a large antenna. Several skyscrapers are visible surrounding the two towers.	New York City	1,368 (417)	110	1971	2001	Destroyed in the September 11 attacks; tallest building in the world from 1971 until 1973.
2 World Trade Center	Aerial view of two 110-story twin towers; the building have gray, steel exteriors, and the structure on the left is topped by a large antenna. Several skyscrapers are visible surrounding the two towers.	New York City	1,362 (415)	110	1971	2001	Destroyed in the September 11 attacks.
270 Park Avenue		New York City	707 (216)	52	1959	2021	Demolished to make room for much taller replacement listed above. Built for Union Carbide. The second tallest voluntarily demolished building in history and tallest voluntarily demolished building from 2021 to 2023.
Singer Building †	Drawing of a 50-story building with a square-cross section; a large tower projects from one corner of the building, and the tower has a rounded roofline with a tapering spire.	New York City	612 (187)	47	1907	1968	Demolished to make room for One Liberty Plaza; tallest building ever to be peacefully demolished until 270 Park Avenue in 2021; tallest building in the world from 1908 until 1909.
7 World Trade Center	Aerial view of a skyscraper with a trapezoidal cross section and a brown glass exterior	New York City	570 (174)	47	1985	2001	Destroyed in the September 11 attacks.
Morrison Hotel		Chicago	526 (160)	45	1925	1965	Demolished to make room for the Chase Tower.
Deutsche Bank Building	Ground-level view of a 40-story building; the highest 20 floors have a black tarp-like covering. The exterior facade has been removed from the lower 20 floors, leaving exposed steel columns visible.	New York City	517 (158)	39	1973	2011	Demolished because of damage from the September 11 attacks.
One Meridian Plaza		Philadelphia	492 (150)	38	1972	1999	Demolished because of damage from a 1991 fire.
City Investing Building	Singer, City Investing & Hudson Terminal Buildings, New York City (1909).	New York City	487 (148)	33	1907	1968	Demolished with the Singer Building to make room for One Liberty Plaza.
J.L. Hudson Company Department Store		Detroit	410 (125)	29	1911	1998	Tallest building ever imploded from 1998 to 2020; largest ever imploded by floor area; tallest department store in the world at the time of its completion.

== Timeline of tallest buildings ==
This is a list of the history of the tallest buildings in the United States by architectural height.

This lists buildings that once held the title of tallest building in the United States.

† Was the world's tallest building upon completion

Name	Image	Location	Years as tallest	Height ft (m)	Floors	Reference
Christ Church, Philadelphia		Philadelphia; 39°57′2.60″N 75°8′37.90″W	1754–1810	197 ft (60 m)	1	
Park Street Church	Ground-level view of a brick church with a large, white, tapering spire; a brown skyscraper is visible in the distance, with several shorter high-rises located closer to the church.	Boston; 42°21′24.42″N 71°3′43.18″W	1810–1845	217 ft (66 m)	1	
St. Paul's Episcopal Church		Richmond, Virginia; 37°32′23.7″N 77°26′06.1″W	1845–1846	225 ft (69 m)	2	
Trinity Church	Ground-level view of a large, brown church with Gothic architecture and a tall, tapering spire that is only partially visible in the image	New York City; 40°42′28.58″N 74°0′43.88″W	1846–1869	279 ft (85 m)	1	
Saint Michael's Church	Ground-level view of a large, brick church with several stained glass windows, architectural niches, and a tall, tapering spire	Chicago; 41°54′44.79″N 87°38′26.7″W	1869–1885	290 ft (88 m)	1	
Chicago Board of Trade Building		Chicago (demolished 1929)	1885–1890	322 ft (98 m)	10	
New York World Building	Drawing of 20-story building with a tan exterior; the roof is topped with a large, gold dome and a flagpole.	New York City (demolished 1955)	1890–1894	348 ft (106 m)	20	
Philadelphia City Hall †	Bird's eye view of a large building with a white exterior and a tall spire; the spire has a rounded roof and is topped with a black statue.	Philadelphia; 39°57′8.85″N 75°9′48.83″W	1894–1908	548 ft (167 m)	7	
Singer Building †	Drawing of a 50-story building with a square-cross section; a large tower projects from one corner of the building, and the tower has a rounded roofline with a tapering spire.	New York City (demolished 1968)	1908–1909	612 ft (187 m)	47	
Metropolitan Life Insurance Company Tower †	Aerial view of a thin, 50-story building with a light exterior; the building has a pyramidal roof with a large spire, and a clock is visible below the roofline.	New York City; 40°44′28.54″N 73°59′15.03″W	1909–1913	700 ft (213 m)	50	
Woolworth Building †	Distant ground-level view of a 60-story building; the building has setbacks on several levels and a pyramidal copper roof with several large spires.	New York City; 40°42′44.29″N 74°0′28.96″W	1913–1929	792 ft (241 m)	57	
Bank of Manhattan Trust Building †	Distant aerial view of a 70-story building with several setbacks and a pyramidal roof; a flagpole sits stop the roof.	New York City; 40°42′25.05″N 74°0′34.73″W	1929-1930	927 ft (283 m)	70	
Chrysler Building †	Ground-level view of an 80-story building; the structure has a stone, whitish exterior with several setbacks. Statues project from the building near the 60th floor, and the building tapers into a thin spire containing angled triangular windows.	New York City; 40°45′5.44″N 73°58′31.84″W	1930–1931	1,046 ft (319 m)	77	
Empire State Building †	Aerial view of a 100-story building with several setbacks; the building tapers into a large circular spire near its 90th floor and is topped by a large antenna.	New York City; 40°44′54.36″N 73°59′8.36″W	1931–1971	1,250 ft (381 m)	102	
World Trade Center †	Aerial view of two 110-story twin towers; the building have gray, steel exteriors, and the structure on the left is topped by a large antenna. Several skyscrapers are visible surrounding the two towers.	New York City (destroyed 2001)	1971–1972	1,368 ft (417 m)	110	
Willis Tower † (formerly Sears Tower)	Distant ground-level view of a 108-story building with a black steel exterior and dark windows; the building has setbacks at several levels, and two large antennas rise above its roof.	Chicago; 41°52′43.82″N 87°38′9.73″W	1972–2013	1,451 ft (442 m)	108	
One World Trade Center	View of the 104 story One World Trade Centre with glass exteriors and a fantastic spire to match.	New York City	2013–present	1,776 ft (541 m)	104	

== See also ==
- List of tallest buildings in the world
- List of cities in the United States with the most skyscrapers
- List of tallest buildings by U.S. state and territory
- List of tallest structures in the United States by height
- List of tallest structures in the United States by state
