= Franklin Center (Chicago) =

Office skyscraper in Chicago, Illinois

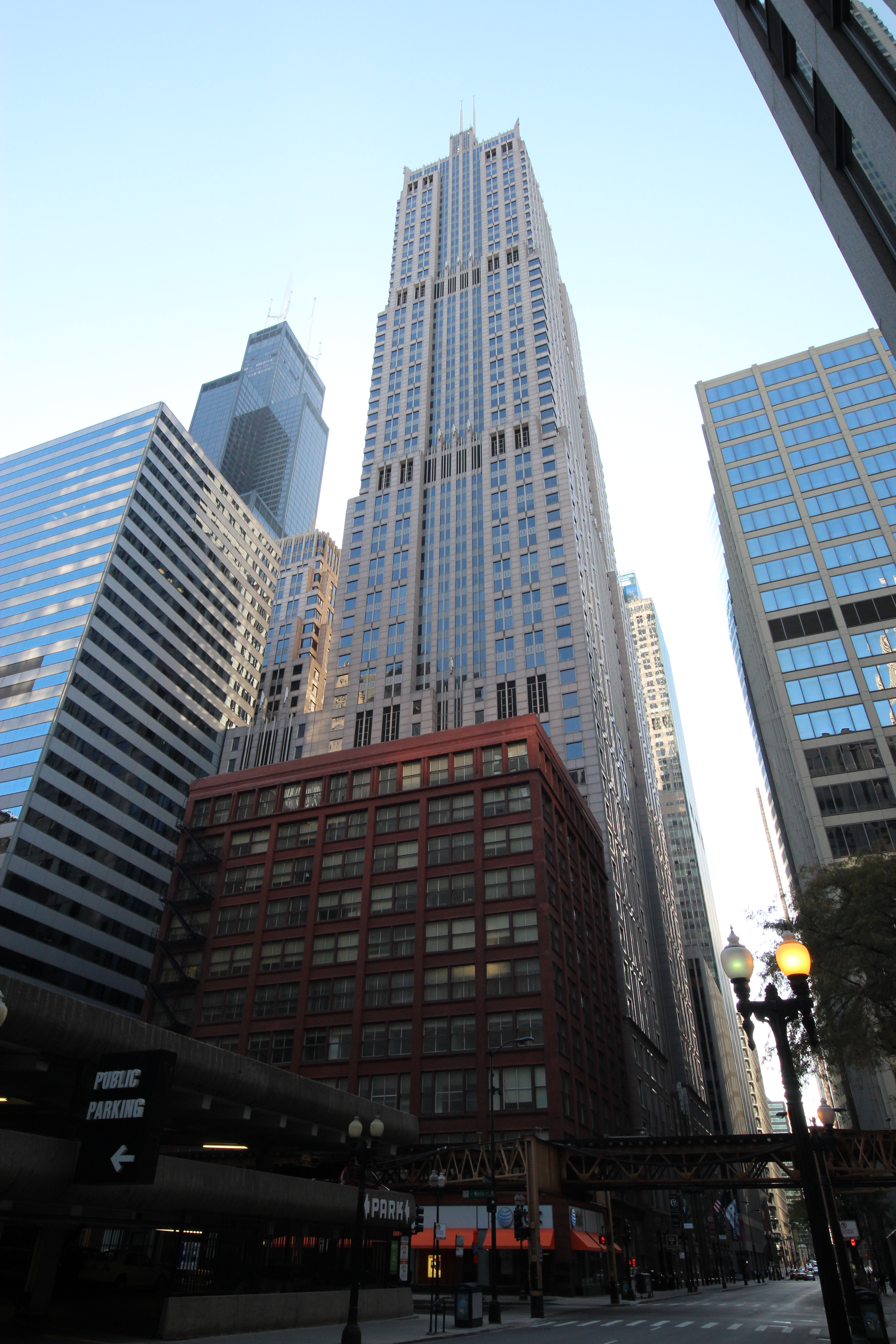
- The Franklin Center in 2012

General information
- Status: Completed
- Type: Office
- Architectural style: Postmodern
- Location: 227 West Monroe Street; Chicago, Illinois
- Coordinates: 41.880681°N 87.634184°W
- Construction started: 1987
- Completed: 1989

Height
- Architectural: 1,007 feet (307 m)
- Roof: 889 feet (271 m)
- Top floor: 889 feet (271 m)

Technical details
- Floor count: 62
- Floor area: 1,699,987 sq ft (157,934.0 m^{2})

Design and construction
- Architects: Adrian D. Smith, Skidmore, Owings & Merrill
- Developer: AT&T/Stein & Company
- Structural engineer: William F. Baker, Skidmore, Owings & Merrill
- Main contractor: Mayfair Construction/Blount International

Website
- thefranklinchicago.com

The Franklin Center is a 60-story supertall skyscraper in the Loop, the downtown neighborhood of Chicago. Completed in 1989 as the AT&T Corporate Center to consolidate the central region headquarters of the American Telephone & Telegraph Company (AT&T), it stands at a height of 1,007 ft (307 m) and contains 1.7 million sq ft (160,000 m^{2}) of floor space. It is located two blocks east of the Chicago River and northeast of the Willis Tower with a main address of 227 West Monroe Street and an alternate address of 100 South Franklin Street.

The building is the tallest constructed in Chicago in the last quarter of the 20th century. It is the 6th tallest building in Chicago and the 23rd tallest in the United States. It contains office and retail space and a 350-space garage.

Tishman Speyer acquired the property in 2004 and renamed the adjacent USG Building as Franklin Center in 2007 after USG relocated its offices. The name was later applied to the entire complex.

== History ==
A 1982 consent decree split the American Telephone & Telegraph Company monopoly into several entities with local service providers becoming part of a Regional Bell Operating Company. In the decade that followed, AT&T erected new buildings across the country including the AT&T Building in New York City. April 5, 1985, AT&T issued a request for proposals that produced eleven respondents. Stein and Co., the winning realtor, sought Skidmore, Owings and Merrill as designers for the purpose of distinguishing a proposal from the nearby Willis Tower. AT&T employees began to occupy the office space April 3, 1989.

The building was built under a self-imposed comprehensive minority contracting and affirmative action package that met the city's 1985 30% hiring rule for public sector projects. Chicago mayor Harold Washington's administration issued a directive that 30% of the work for public sector projects be set aside for minority and women-owned businesses. In a show of support for this rule, Stein & Co. and AT&T adopted the rule for its private development.

== Architecture ==
Designed by Adrian D. Smith of Skidmore, Owings & Merrill, the Franklin Center is one of the most famous and recognized buildings in Chicago. The building's form features setbacks at the 15th, 30th and 45th floors. Designed in the postmodern architectural style, it is a granite-clad steel-framed building resting on pile foundations. The structure is characterized by strong vertical lines, spiked roof pinnacles, granite cladding and setbacks. The granite is a deep red color at the base, but changes shade to rose-beige at the top. Above the 5th floor, the lighter rose-beige granite is protected by silk-screened aluminum panels. The building relies on Gothic detailing to showcase verticality. The building's verticality evokes images of 1920s buildings, and the sturdiness of the structure is reminiscent of the Chicago Board of Trade Building. In addition to its design, the building relies on its location at the farthest corner from the Willis Tower to set it apart.

=== Interior ===
The Otis elevators are spanned by a series of neo-deco light bands extending wall to wall. The lobby extends completely through the block, with a giant entrance hall at Monroe Street and a 16-story full-height atrium in the link between the AT&T and USG towers (also designed by Smith) as both towers share a common appearance. The building boasts two public lobbies and a mezzanine-level lobby. The lobbies are among the most lavish in Chicago, and they are all decorated with patterned marble floors and walls, bronze, gold-leaf oak trim, and stylized lighting fixtures.

=== Features ===
The building features a lobby-level 650-seat restaurant, a 23,000-square-foot (2,100 m^{2}) retail concourse on two levels, and a 170-car 24-hour parking facility on the lower two levels. The building lobby extends all the way through the block to connect with the USG Building and an atrium links the two structures.

=== Exterior lighting ===
As with other downtown buildings, the tower's setbacks and spires are accented by colored lights at night. The building's managers were praised for dimming their lights during bird migrations, reducing bird mortality 80%.

== USG Building ==
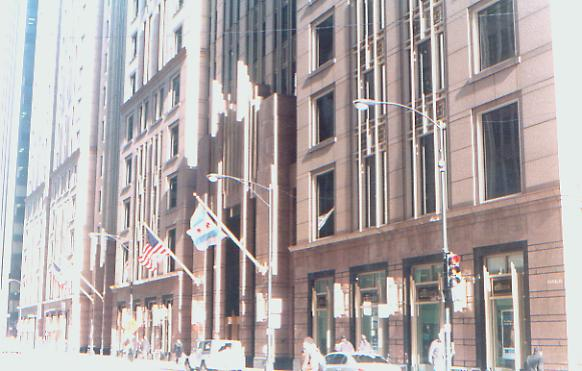
Franklin Street facade

The USG Corporation developed the 35-story 1.1-million-square-foot (100,000 m^{2}) structure originally known as the USG Building as its corporate headquarters building immediately adjacent to and connected to the AT&T Corporate Center in 1992. Located at 125 South Franklin Street, the same developers, architects and design teams were chosen, and the two buildings were built jointly as a block-long complex on an 85,000-square-foot (7,900 m^{2}) site. They share a 16-story atrium which houses a grand arcade and serves as a common base to the two separate towers. When USG Corporation moved to a new facility in 2007, the building was renamed Franklin Center.

== Proximity to transit ==
Positioned near the southwest corner of the Loop, the building is near two elevated stations of the Chicago 'L'. The Quincy station is one block to the south and the Washington and Wells station is located two blocks to the north, both on Wells Street. Union Station stands three blocks to the west on Jackson Boulevard, providing terminal service for Amtrak and select service for Metra. Additional Metra service is provided at the LaSalle Street Station, four blocks to the south and Ogilvie Transportation Center station four blocks to the north-west.

== Tenants ==
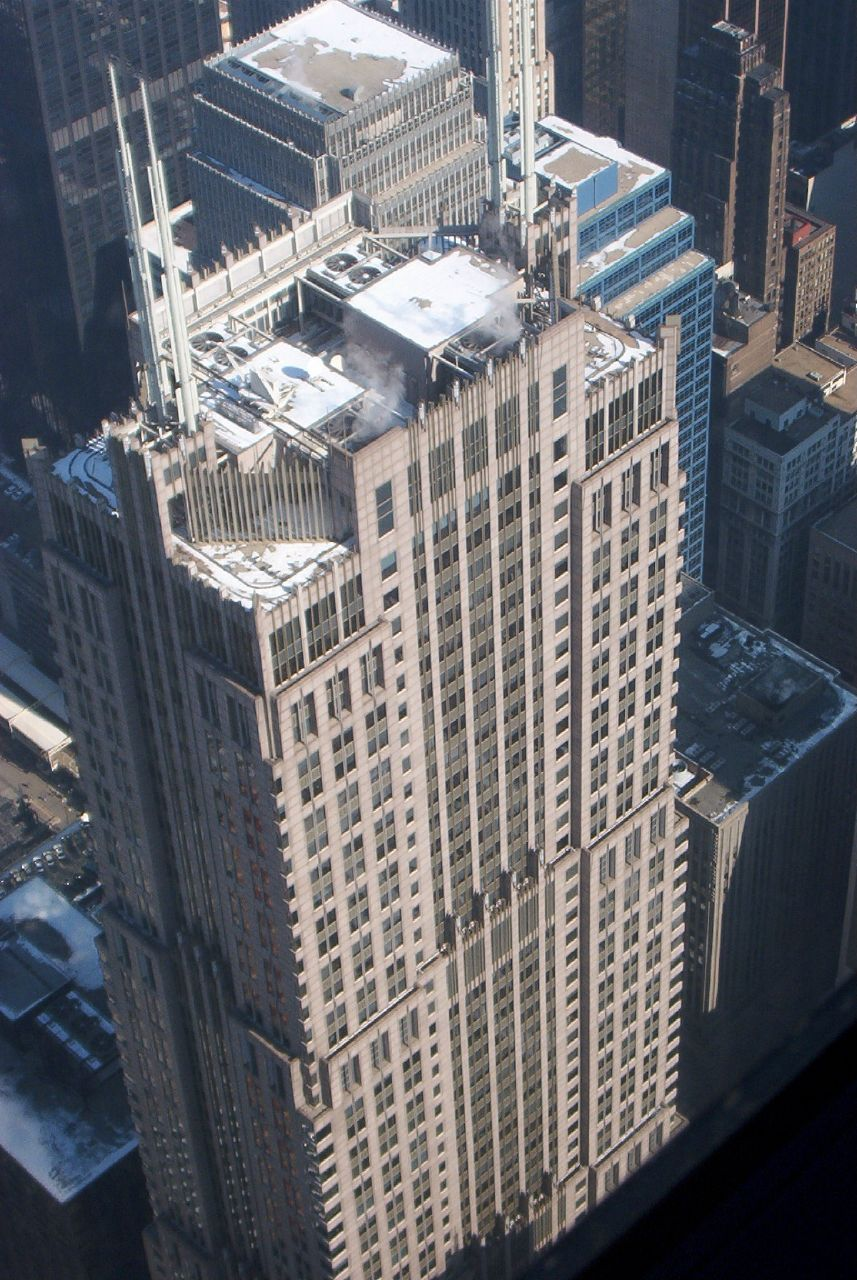
The top of the Franklin Center

- A.T. Kearney
- Amazon
- Centurylink
- Citigroup
- Credit Agricole
- Glanbia Nutritionals
- KeyBank
- Options Clearing Corporation
- Cantor Fitzgerald
- Credit Suisse
- Eris Exchange
- FTI Consulting
- General American Transportation Corporation
- Guggenheim Partners
- HSBC
- John Crane Group
- Robert W. Baird & Co.
- The Cambridge Group
- TGG Group
- The Trade Desk
- West Monroe Partners
- Zekelman Industries

== Awards ==
- 1990 - Award of Excellence for Urban Development, from the Chicago Chapter of the National Association of Industrial and Office Properties
- 1992 - Best New Building, from the Chicago civic group Friends of Downtown
- 1997 - Most Valuable Property National Top Ten, from The Wall Street Journal
- 1998 - Prix d'Excellence, Office Properties Worldwide, from FIABCI International

== Position in Chicago's skyline (2006) ==
The Center is the 6th tallest completed building in Chicago, trailing the Willis Tower, Aon Center, John Hancock Center, and Trump International Hotel and Tower (Chicago) in height. (The latter is not pictured below, as it was constructed after the image was produced.)

The Center's official height measurement increased to from 886 feet (270 m) to 1,007 feet (307 m) when the Council on Tall Buildings and Urban Habitat changed measurement conventions to include ornamental spires during the Willis Tower–Petronas Tower height controversy.

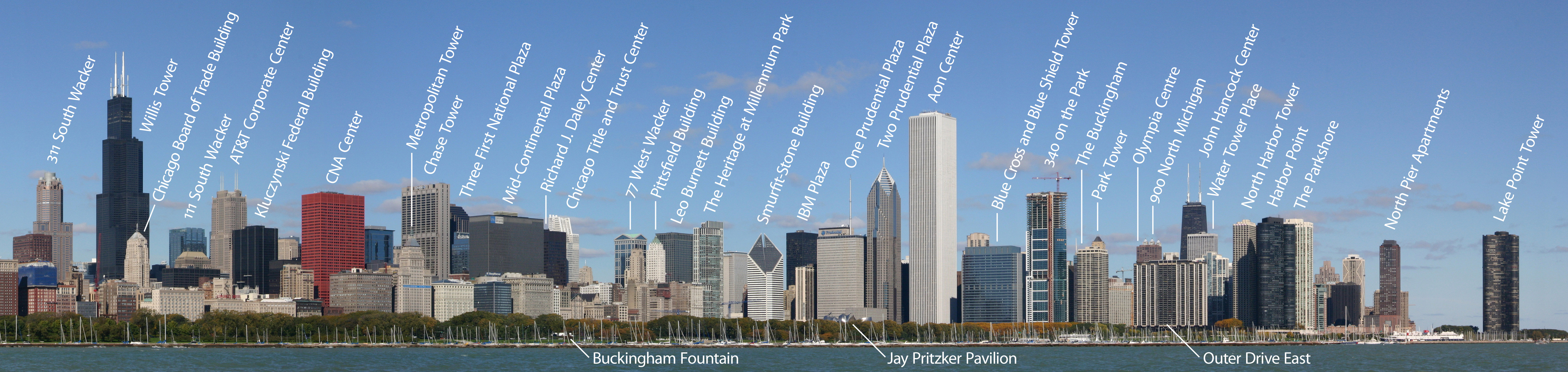

== See also ==
- List of buildings
- List of tallest buildings in the world
- List of tallest buildings in the world by continent
- List of tallest buildings in Chicago
- List of tallest buildings in the United States
- List of tallest buildings and structures in the world
- List of tallest buildings and structures in the world by country
- List of tallest structures in the world
- List of tallest structures in the world by type of use
- List of tallest structures in the United States
