= Okan International University =

Private university in Florida

- Other name: OIU
- Established: 2015; 11 years ago
- President: Bekir Okan
- Location: Dania Beach, Florida; 26.0526664°N 80.1414613°W
- Website: www.okanintl.com
- Location within Florida

Okan International University was a private university in Dania Beach, Florida, United States, offering bachelor's and master's degree programs.

== History ==
OIU was founded in 2015. Its main campus was in Dania Beach, Florida, just north of Miami.

== Curricula ==
Okan International University (OIU) offers bachelor's and master's degree programs.

- B.A. – Business Management
- B.A. – Healthcare Management
- B.A. – Hospitality and Tourism Management
- M.B.A. – Master of Business Management
- M.A. – Healthcare Management
- M.A. – Hospitality and Tourism Management

== Accreditation ==
OIU is licensed by Florida Department of Education.

OIU is accredited by the Accrediting Commission of Career Schools and Colleges, Alexandria, VA. meeting the requirements of the U.S. Department of Education and SEVIS administered by the U.S. Department of Homeland Security.

Okan is a member of the Florida Association of Postsecondary Schools and Colleges.

In July 2017, Okan International University applied to the Florida Board of Nursing for LPN/RN, Bachelors of Nursing and Masters of Nursing Degree Programs.

== See also ==
- Okan Tower
