= Legends Tower =

Proposed skyscraper in Oklahoma City, Oklahoma

Legends Tower Hyatt Dream Hotel (Phase 1 & 3)
- Proposed design (January 2024)

General information
- Status: Proposed (Legends Tower); Under construction (Hyatt Dream Hotel Phase 1); Site preparation (Hyatt Dream Hotel Phase 2); Proposed (Hyatt Dream Hotel Phase 3)
- Type: Residential, hotel, retail
- Location: Bricktown, Oklahoma City, Oklahoma, United States
- Coordinates: 35.46290°N 97.51194°W
- Construction started: 2020s
- Estimated completion: 2030s
- Opening: 2030s

Height
- Height: 1,907 feet (581 m); 300 feet (91 m)

Technical details
- Floor count: 134 (Legends Tower); 22 (Hyatt Dream Hotel Phase)

Design and construction
- Architect: AO
- Developer: Matteson Capital

The Legends Tower is a planned supertall skyscraper in the Bricktown entertainment district of Oklahoma City, Oklahoma, United States. The 134-story building is planned to stand 1,907 feet (581 m) tall, a reference to Oklahoma's admission to the Union as the 46th state in 1907; 119 years ago. Developed by real estate firm Matteson Capital and architecture firm AO, Legends Tower would be the centerpiece of the planned mixed-use development The Boardwalk at Bricktown.

If built, Legends Tower will become the seventh-tallest building in the world, the tallest building in the United States and Western Hemisphere, surpassing the One World Trade Center in New York City, and more than doubling the height of Oklahoma City's current tallest building, the 50-story Devon Energy Center, which was built in late 2012. It will also surpass Toronto's CN Tower to become the tallest freestanding structure in the western hemisphere.

== History ==
Initial plans for Legends Tower first emerged in December 2023, several months after Matteson Capital and AO proposed the mixed-use development, The Boardwalk at Bricktown, to the Oklahoma City Council in August 2023. Legends Tower was originally planned to be 1,750 feet (530 m) tall, which would have made it the second-tallest building in the United States after New York City's One World Trade Center.

On January 19, 2024, a revised plan for The Boardwalk at Bricktown, including the increased 1,907 feet (581 m) height of Legends Tower, was unveiled in a press release by Matteson Capital, AO, and several other development firms. The revised height is an allusion to the fact that Oklahoma became a U.S. state in 1907. Matteson Capital CEO Scot Matteson said the development aims to capitalize on Oklahoma City's growth, stating: "We believe that this development will be an iconic destination for the city, further driving the expansion and diversification of the growing economy, drawing in investment, new businesses, and jobs. It's a dynamic environment and we hope to see The Boardwalk at Bricktown stand as the pride of Oklahoma City." The revised plan required renewed approval from the Oklahoma City Council, due to a zoning rule that limits buildings in the area to 300 feet (91 m) tall; Matteson and AO had negotiated an exception to the rule for their original proposal.

On March 11, 2024, Matteson announced that the Boardwalk at Bricktown project had fully secured $1.5 billion in financing, but Legends Tower still awaited approval from the city council and the Federal Aviation Administration (FAA). Scot Matteson said that he wanted to begin clearing the 4-acre (1.6 ha) site by that summer.

On April 11, 2024, the Oklahoma City Planning Commission recommended the city council approve zoning for the project, but warned that they disliked the extensive use of LED signage throughout the development shown in the renderings. Matteson said he planned to start work on the first stage, which consists of two towers and a Dream Hotel, 23 and 22 stories above a retail podium respectively, in summer 2024. The second phase would consist of the Legends Tower, which rises to 1,907 ft (581 m) and 126 stories above the podium.

On June 4, 2024, the Oklahoma City Council voted 8–1 to approve the rezoning required to build Legends Tower, leaving only the building's digital signage pending approval from the city. The development's construction was delayed in late 2024, while the FAA reviewed the proposed skyscraper's impact on landing and takeoff procedures at nearby airports. In response, Matteson said he would shorten the planned tower if it were deemed necessary. By July 2025, Matteson said that work on Boardwalk at Bricktown would begin shortly, after the project had obtained $700 million in funding. As of August 2025, the project was still ongoing, but construction had been delayed; the development of the smaller towers in the first phase was supposed to begin later that year.

== Usage ==
Legends Tower is planned to be a mixed-use building with hotel, residential, and retail functions, including a 350-key Hyatt hotel, 1,776 apartments, and 110,000 square feet (10,000 m^{2}) of retail stores and restaurants. The top floors of the building are planned to feature a restaurant and observation deck with views of the city.

The surrounding Boardwalk at Bricktown complex would cover 3 acres (1.2 ha), including three more buildings each rising to 345 feet (105 m), another Hyatt hotel, additional retail and restaurant space, open plazas, parking garages, a lagoon, and a new arena for the Oklahoma City Thunder of the National Basketball Association.

== Reactions ==
When the project was announced, it was widely reported around the world, in part due to the Legends Tower's height and the complete lack of any similarly-sized buildings nearby. Some critics of the project have labeled it unfeasible, citing zoning challenges, high interest rates, the prevalence of tornadoes in Oklahoma, and Oklahoma City's lack of existing urban density. Kenton Tsoodle, CEO of the Alliance for Economic Development of Oklahoma City, called the project "aspirational," adding, "If they build something like that, great. Obviously, that would be market-driven." Economist, professor, and skyscraper expert Jason Barr described the building as "an unprecedented outlier" that is "way too tall given the city's population".

There were also worries that the planned height of the project could block air traffic going to and from the nearby military installation, Tinker Air Force Base, causing increased congestion and blocking major routes out of the city.

Oklahoma City mayor David Holt was indifferent about the project, writing in a statement to CNN: "In my observation private developers often announce plans and some of those plans happen, and some don't. I have no strong opinion and look forward to following their effort."
