= 311 South Wacker Drive =

Office skyscraper in Chicago, Illinois

Coordinates: 41°52′40″N 87°38′08″W

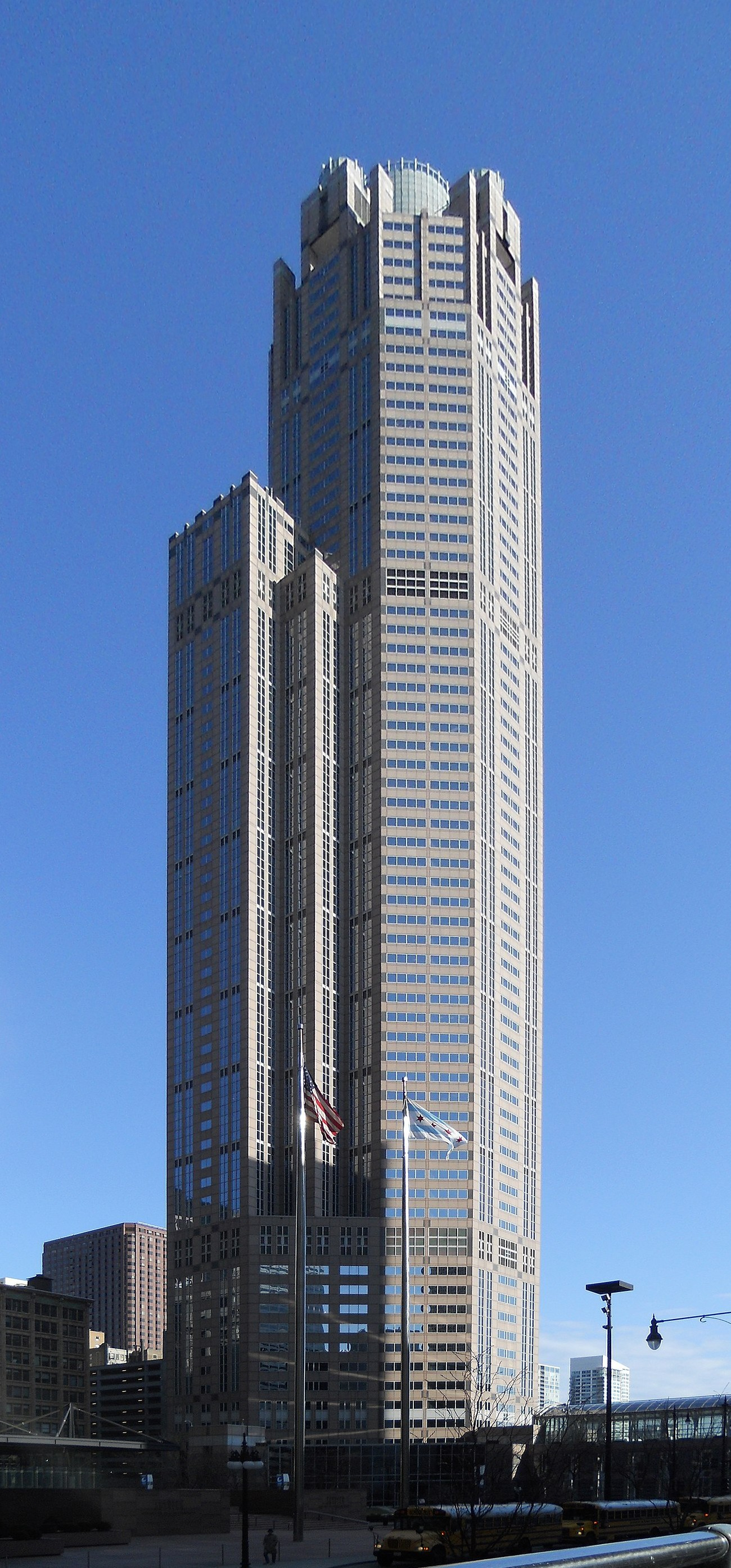

General information
- Status: Completed
- Type: Office
- Location: 311 S. Wacker Drive; Chicago, Illinois
- Construction started: 1988
- Completed: 1990

Height
- Architectural: 292.9 m (961 ft)
- Roof: 293 m (961 ft)
- Top floor: 256.8 m (843 ft)

Technical details
- Floor count: 65
- Floor area: 1,400,000 ft^{2} (130,000 m^{2})
- Lifts/elevators: 34

Design and construction
- Architects: Rick del Monte; Kohn Pedersen Fox Associates; HKS
- Developer: Gerald Kostelny/Lincoln Property Company
- Structural engineer: Brockette/Davis/Drake, Inc.
- Main contractor: J.A. Jones Construction Construction Manager was Harbour Contractors, inc.

311 South Wacker Drive is a post-modern 65-story skyscraper located in Chicago, Illinois, and completed in 1990. At 961 feet (293 m) tall, it is the ninth-tallest building in Chicago and the 36th tallest in the United States. It was once the tallest reinforced concrete building in the world. 311 South Wacker was also the tallest building in the world known only by its street address, until it was surpassed in height by New York's 432 Park Avenue in 2015. 311 South Wacker occupies a prominent position in the Chicago skyline, being located on the block immediately to the south of the Willis Tower.

The lower level of the winter garden was designed for a possible connection via underground passageway to Chicago Union Station. The building also contains three levels of underground parking. The building contains both retail and commercial tenants.

== Lobby ==
The lobby is a two-level (one below ground) 85-foot (26 m)-tall glass-ceilinged "winter garden." It used to have palm trees, still has a fountain, and is supported by a steel structure influenced by the Chicago "L" tracks and bridges. It was envisioned as a commuter link or "pedestrian station" serving as a connection from the nearby Union Station through a disused streetcar tunnel under the South Branch of the Chicago River. Raymond Kaskey's bronze sculpture "Gem of the Lakes" looks over the garden from the Wacker entrance. The fountain shell form is taken from the city seal with a heroic figure representing Chicago as the "city of broad shoulders" wearing a cape symbolic of the great engineering feat which reversed the flow of Chicago River.

== Crown ==
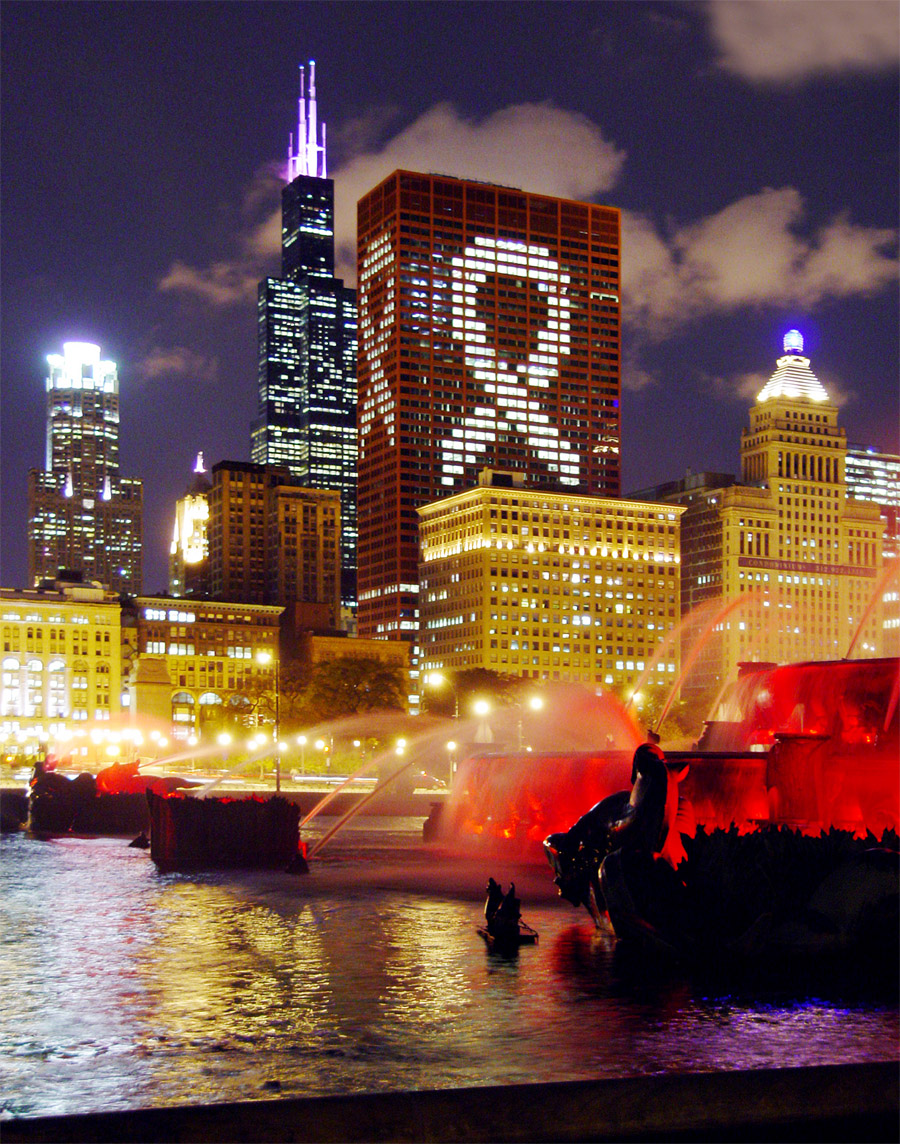
CNA's building illuminated to reflect Breast Cancer Awareness Month. 311 South Wacker Drive can be seen in the left, with the top portion brightly illuminated.

The top of the building is a 105-foot (32 m)-tall translucent cylinder, surrounded by four other smaller cylinders, which was inspired by the massing of the Tribune Tower. This makes it among the most visible Chicago skyscrapers at night, as its crown is brightly illuminated. The five cylinders on top are lit at night by 1,852 fluorescent tubes, and a lantern at the top changes colors for various holidays and special events.

== Park ==
311 South Wacker is surrounded to the northwest by a grassy area, commonly used as a lounging and public lunch area during warm months, which is the largest area of green space in the Chicago Loop. This park is used to host local farmer markets, musical events, and various art and cultural festivals. To the southwest is a parking lot. This land was originally to be occupied by two companion towers that were never developed due to office market conditions.

== Position in Chicago's skyline ==
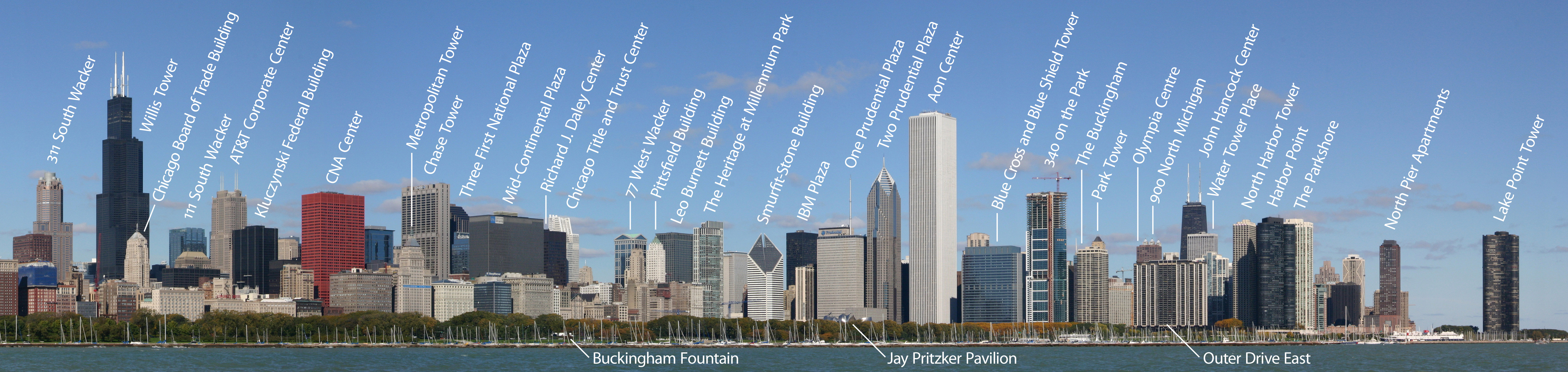

== Gallery ==
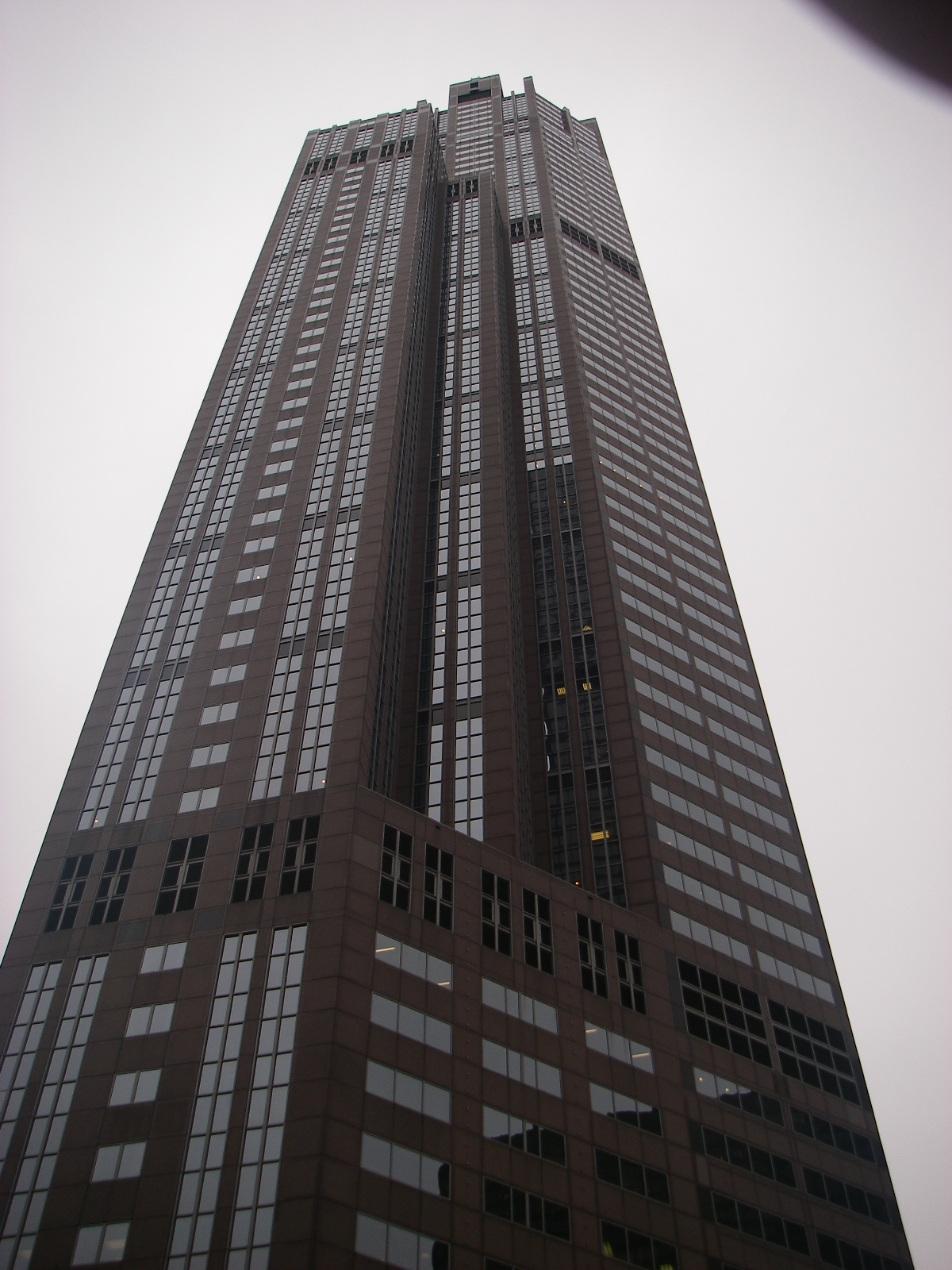
View

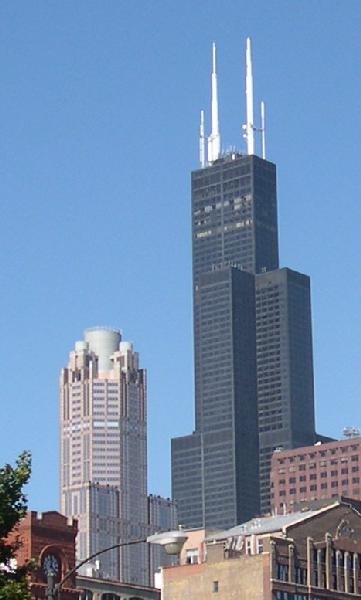
311 South Wacker Drive and Willis Tower

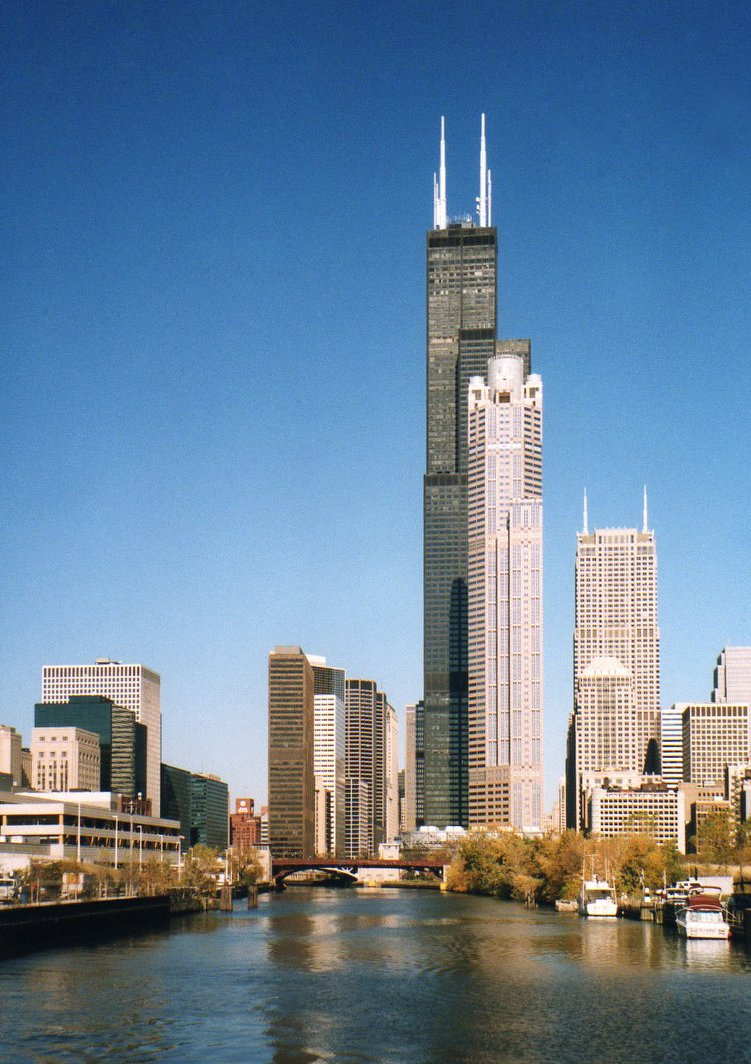
South view taken from Chicago River

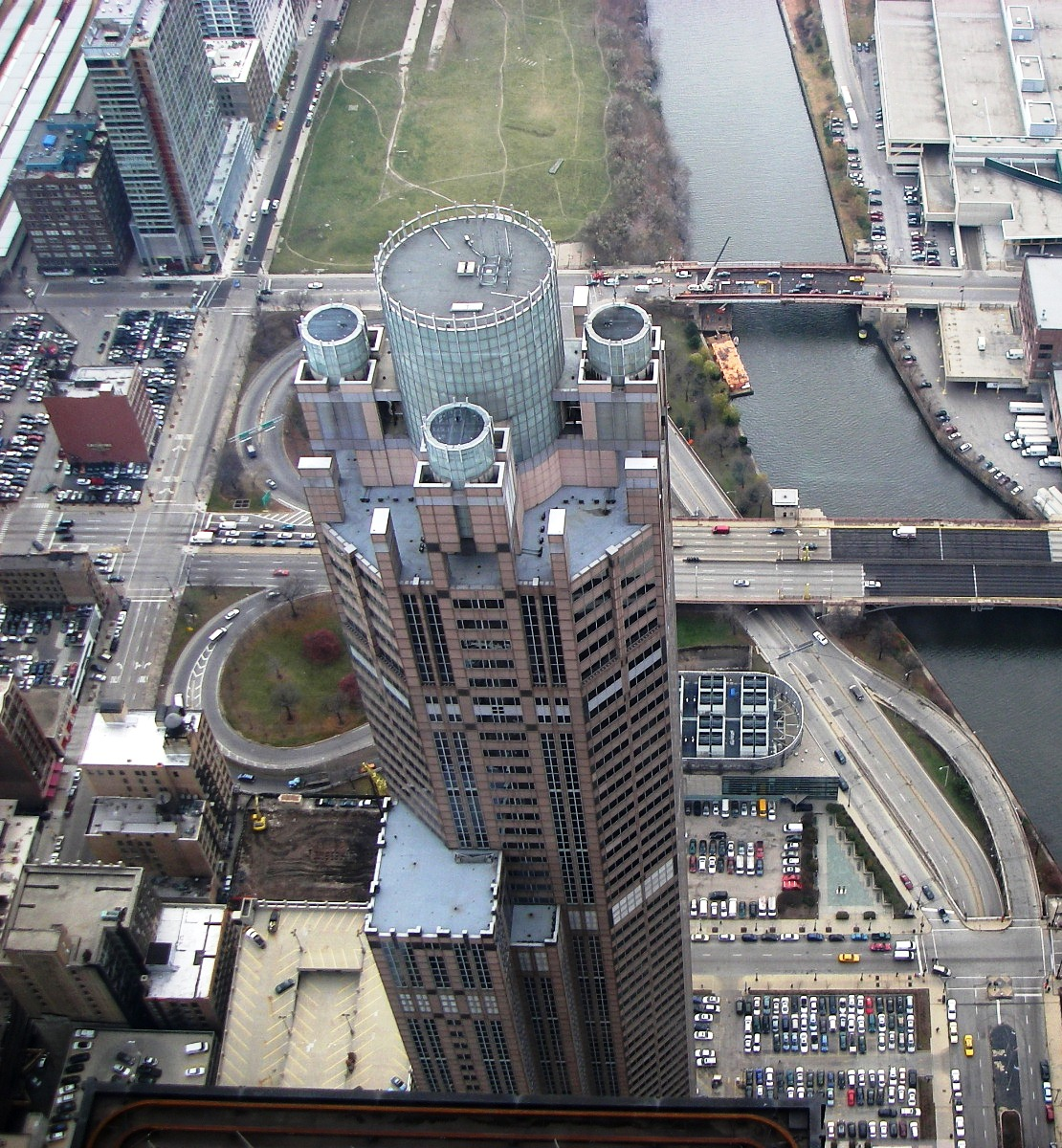
311 South Wacker Drive top viewed from the top floor of Willis Tower

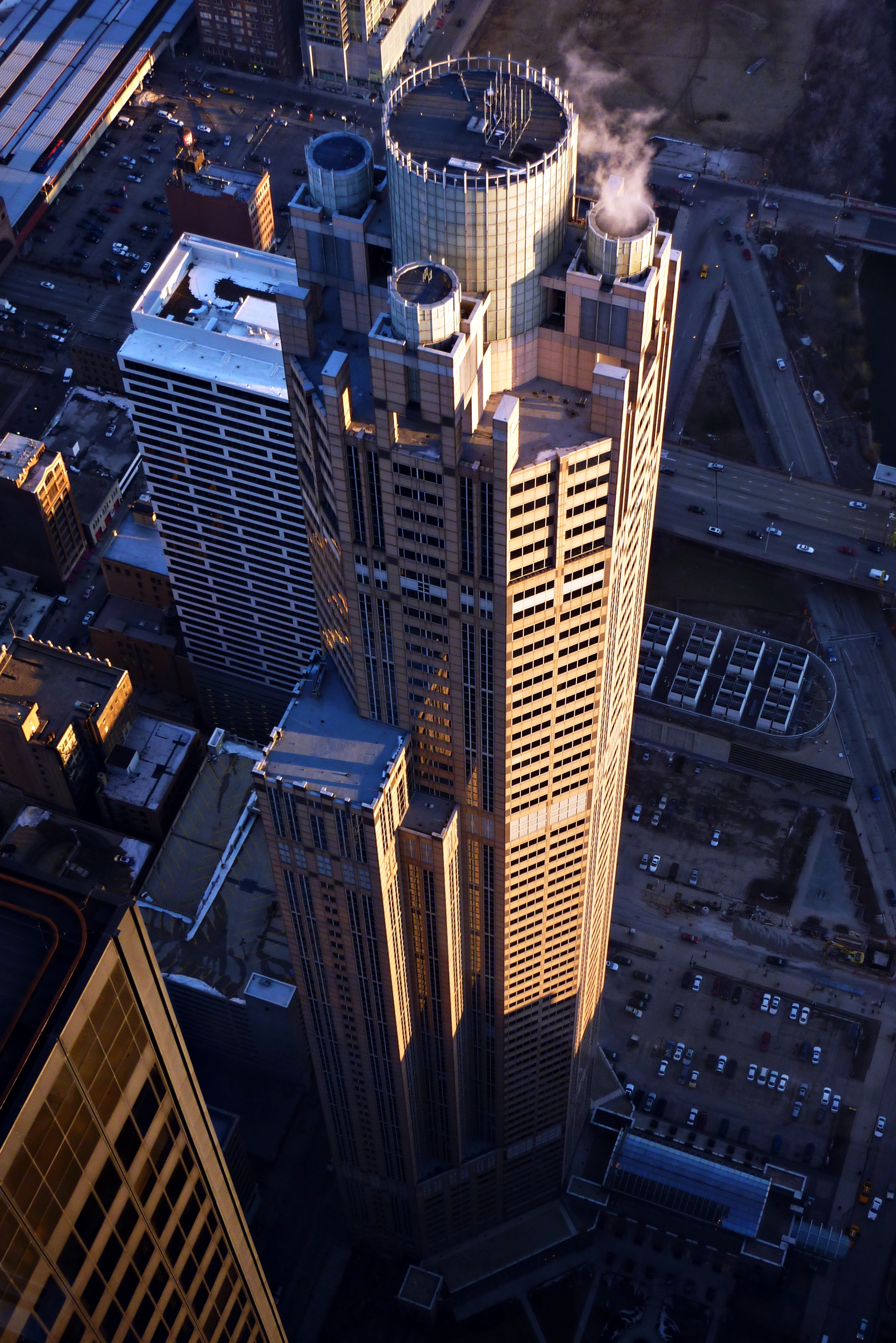
311 South Wacker Drive as viewed from the 103rd floor of the nearby Willis Tower

== See also ==
- List of tallest buildings in the United States
- List of tallest buildings in Chicago
- List of tallest buildings and structures in the world
- List of tallest buildings in the world
- Wacker Drive
