= One Chicago (building) =

Proposed development in Chicago, Illinois

- Alternative names: Formerly One Chicago Square

General information
- Status: Completed
- Type: Mixed Use
- Location: 14 West Superior Street, Chicago, Illinois 60610
- Coordinates: 41°53′46.2″N 87°37′43.6″W
- Construction started: 2019
- Estimated completion: 2022

Height
- Roof: East tower: 971 feet (296 m); West tower: 574 feet (175 m)

Technical details
- Floor count: East tower: 76; West tower: 49

Design and construction
- Architects: Hartshorne Plunkard Architecture, Goettsch Partners

Website
- liveonechicago.com

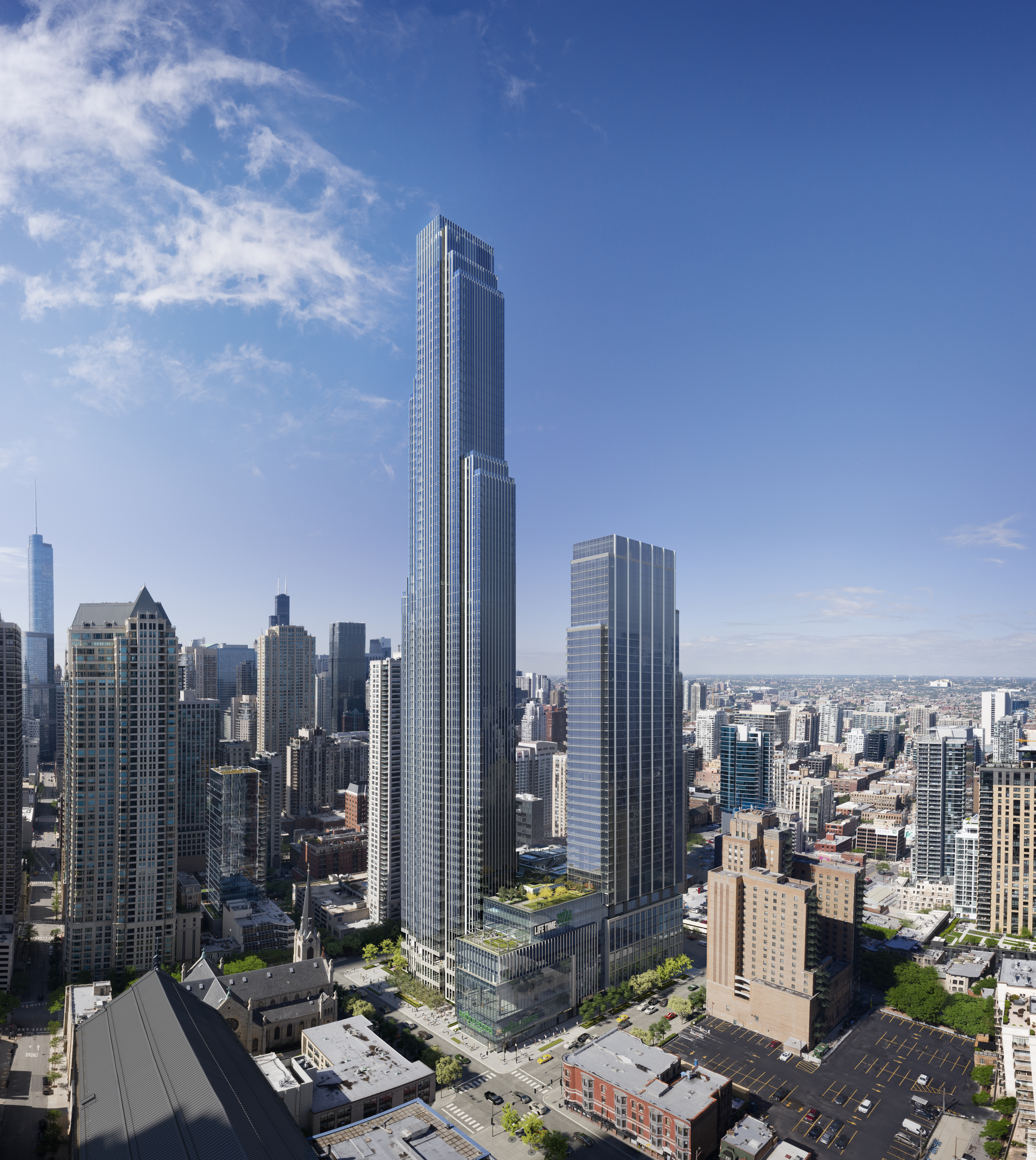
Two towers of One Chicago Hero Rendering

One Chicago (formerly One Chicago Square) is a skyscraper development in the River North neighborhood of Chicago. It features two towers; one tower reaching 971ft and the other tower reaching 574ft. It is among the tallest buildings in Chicago.

== History ==
The building's site previously held a parking lot owned by the Catholic Archdiocese of Chicago. The Archdiocese began seeking a development partner to build a structure on the site through real estate-focused investment bank Eastdil in 2016. The development was approved by the Chicago Plan Commission in 2018. The building topped out in 2021.

In April 2019, the developer JDL announced that the project name was changed from "One Chicago Square" to "One Chicago" to better connect the property to its address of 1 West Chicago Avenue.

== Design ==
Goettsch Partners and Hartshorne Plunkard Architecture designed the buildings. The complex contains two towers connected by a central podium. When completed, the taller of the two towers was to be the eighth-tallest structure in Chicago with an anticipated 78 stories, although a final height was determined and a spire may have been added to the design.

== Usage ==
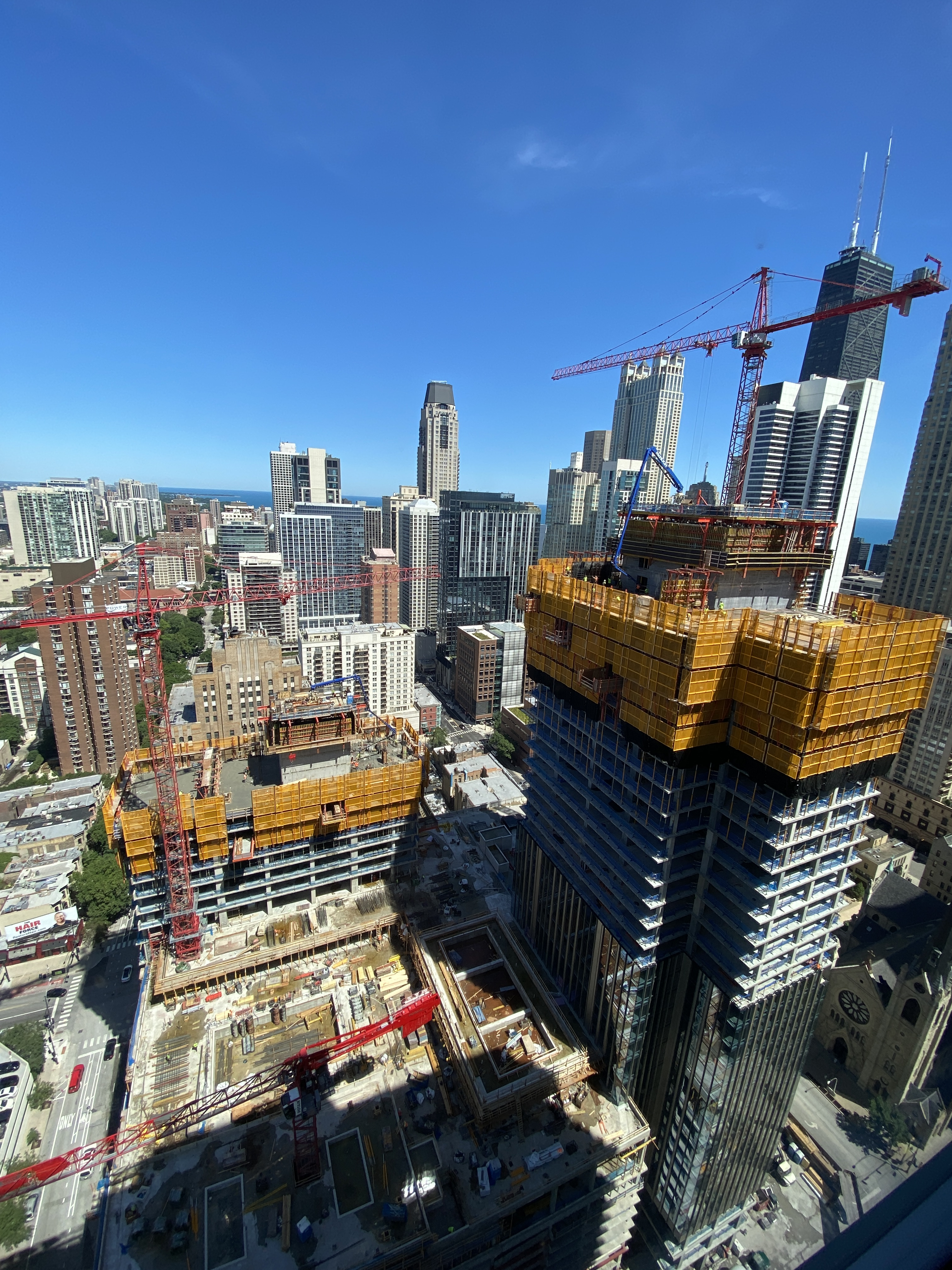
One Chicago Square from One Superior Place

The project is a mixed-use development, though primarily residential, with 812 residential units.

Planned retail tenants for the podium of the two towers include a Whole Foods Market and Life Time luxury athletic resort, as well as an upscale restaurant and an event center catered toward receptions for weddings at Holy Name Cathedral.

The building contains 735 apartments, 77 condominiums, 55,000 sq ft of office space, 188,000 sq ft of retail space, and a Life Time Fitness center.

== See also ==
- List of tallest buildings in Chicago
