= Okan Tower =

Mixed-use skyscraper in Florida, United States

- Interactive map of the Okan Tower area

General information
- Status: Under construction
- Type: Residential
- Location: Miami, Florida, U.S., 555 N. Miami Avenue
- Coordinates: 25.7795°N 80.1937°W
- Construction started: 2022
- Estimated completion: 2027

Height
- Roof: 902 ft (275 m)

Technical details
- Floor count: 70

Design and construction
- Architects: Behar Font & Partners
- Developer: Okan Group

Website
- www.okantowermiami.com

Okan Tower is a mixed-use skyscraper currently under construction in Miami, Florida. Once completed, it will be one of the tallest buildings in the state at 902 feet (275 meters) high. The tower is designed by Behar Font & Partners and funded by Turkish developer Bekir Okan and his company, the Okan Group. It was announced in 2017 and it first broke ground in 2022. It is scheduled to open in 2027.

== History ==
Okan Tower is located at 555 N. Miami Avenue. It will be the first U.S. development for Turkish billionaire developer Bekir Okan and his company, the Okan Group. Okan has been visited Miami frequently since the 1990s, and his daughters went to school there. It was designed by Behar Font & Partners. In March 2017, Miami 6th Street LLC, an affiliate of Okan, bought the development site from Central Baptist Church for $18 million. The site is 36,000 square feet in size. The building was proposed alongside its first renders under the name "The Sterling" on October 5, 2017, and it was approved by the Urban Design Review Board on October 12.

Residence sales started in May 2018 and were managed by ONE Sotheby's International Realty; by this time, the building was known as Okan Tower. Okan Group marketed the residences to Turkish buyers; a sales gallery for buying them was at one point open in Instanbul. There was also a sales gallery in Miami. The Wall Street Journal speculated that Turkish developers were building outside of Turkey due to uncertainty over Turkey's stability under the leadership of President Tayyip Erdogan.

In 2018, the groundbreaking was originally scheduled for later that year, and the opening was scheduled for 2022. The height was originally reported as both 956, then 890. In 2019, the construction, which is self-financed by Okan Group, was estimated to cost $300 million. Construction was paused due to the COVID-19 pandemic. In 2021, it was scheduled to be finished in 2022. The building first broke ground in July 2022. At that point, it was scheduled to open in 2026. In March 2024, the foundation was completed, and it measured at 458,000 cubic feet. In April 2024, new renderings were released of the building. Currently, it is scheduled to open in 2027.

== Design ==
Okan Tower will be a glass building at 70 stories, or 902 feet tall. This will make it one of the tallest buildings in the state. Its design is based on the tulip, Turkey's national flower. A Hilton hotel will occupy floors 11-30, office space will be on floors 31-35, Hilton-owned short-term condominium rentals will occupy floors 36-50, and starting at floor 51, top floors will be non-Hilton condominiums. The ceilings will be 10 feet tall. Amenities will be spread throughout many floors. The lobby will be elevated to a height that will not be affected by rising sea levels.

== See also ==
- Okan International University
- List of tallest buildings in Miami
