= Aon Center (Chicago) =

Skyscraper in Chicago, Illinois

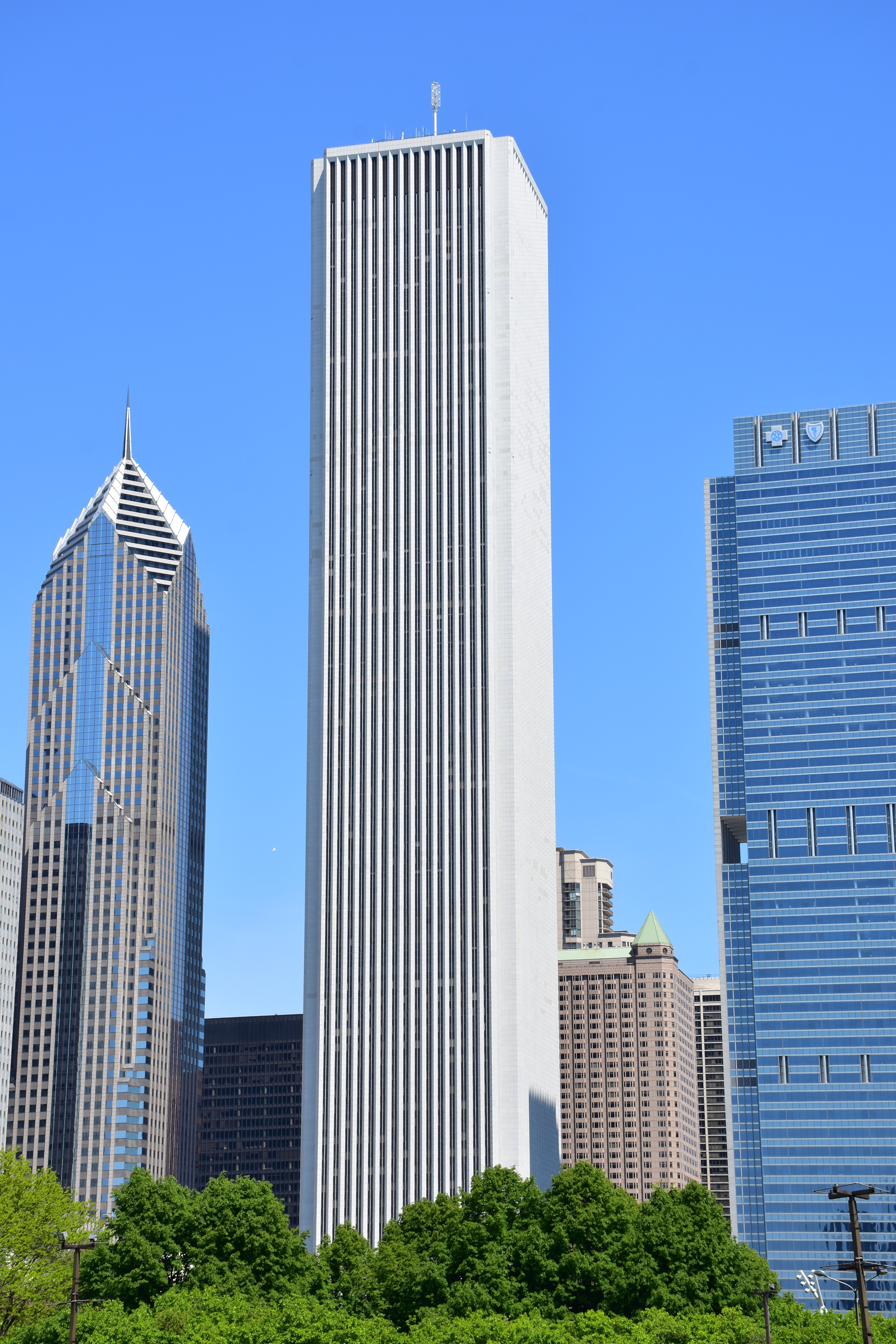
- The Aon Center in 2016

- Location within Chicago metropolitan area Location within Illinois Location within the United States
- Former names: Amoco Building; Standard Oil Building

General information
- Status: Completed
- Type: Office building
- Architectural style: Modern
- Location: 200 E. Randolph St. Chicago, IL 60601, United States
- Coordinates: 41°53′07″N 87°37′17″W
- Construction started: 1970
- Opening: 1973
- Cost: US$120 million
- Owner: Mark Karasick; Victor Gerstein

Height
- Architectural: 346.3 m (1,136 ft)
- Tip: 362.5 m (1,189 ft)
- Top floor: 328 m (1,076 ft)

Technical details
- Floor count: 83 above ground 5 below ground
- Floor area: 334,448 m^{2} (3,599,968 sq ft)
- Lifts/elevators: 50, made by the Otis Elevator Company

Design and construction
- Architect: Edward Durell Stone
- Developer: Standard Oil of Indiana
- Main contractor: Turner Construction

Website
- aoncenter.info

The Aon Center (200 East Randolph Street, formerly Amoco Building) is a modern supertall skyscraper located in the Northeast corner of the Chicago Loop, Chicago, Illinois, United States. It was designed by a partnership between architecture firms Edward Durell Stone and Perkins and Will and was completed in 1973 as the Standard Oil Building (nicknamed "Big Stan"). With 83 floors and a height of 1,136 feet (346 m), it is the fourth-tallest building in Chicago, surpassed in height by the Willis Tower, Trump International Hotel and Tower, and St. Regis Chicago.

The building is managed by JLL, which is also headquartered in the building. Aon Center houses the headquarters of Aon, Blue Cross Blue Shield Association, and Kraft Heinz (BCBS and Kraft Heinz each have a second headquarters, located in Washington D.C. and Pittsburgh respectively); the building formerly served as the world headquarters of Amoco prior to its merger with British Petroleum (now known as BP).

The building was briefly the tallest completed building in Chicago, but was soon surpassed by the Sears Tower. It was the fourth-tallest building in the world at the time of its completion.

== History ==
=== Construction ===
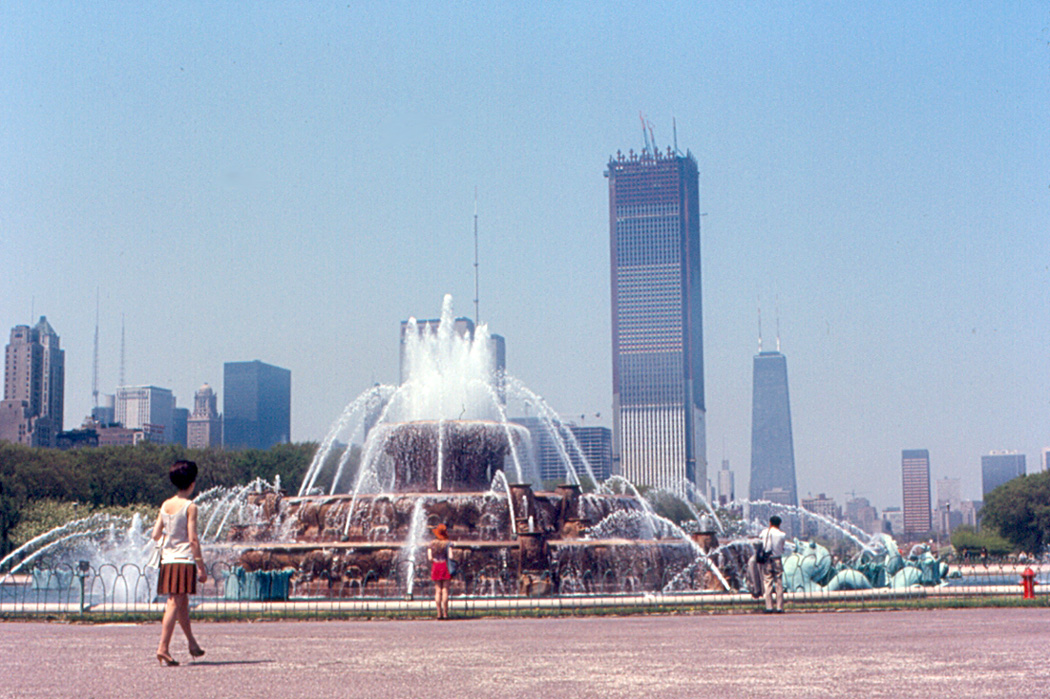
View from Buckingham Fountain of the building while it was under-construction

The Standard Oil Building was constructed as the headquarters of the Standard Oil Company of Indiana. Standard's previous home had been 910 S. Michigan Avenue. This building was constructed in 1911 by the Karpen Brothers Furniture Company and was purchased by Standard in 1927. When the new Standard Oil Building was completed in 1973, it was the tallest completed building in Chicago and the fourth-tallest in the world, earning it the nickname "Big Stan". In 1974, the taller Sears Tower (now Willis Tower) in Chicago surpassed it as the tallest completed building in Chicago (the Sears Tower was also the tallest in the world). However, the Sears Tower had already been topped out in May 1973. When the Aon Center opened as the fourth-tallest completed building in the world, it was only exceeded in height by the twin towers of the original World Trade Center and the Empire State Building in New York City. Originally clad in marble, the Aon Center was also the tallest marble-clad building in the world.

The building employs a tubular steel-framed structural system with V-shaped perimeter columns to resist earthquakes, reduce sway, minimize column bending, and maximize column-free space. This construction method was also used for the original World Trade Center twin towers in New York City.

=== Refacing ===
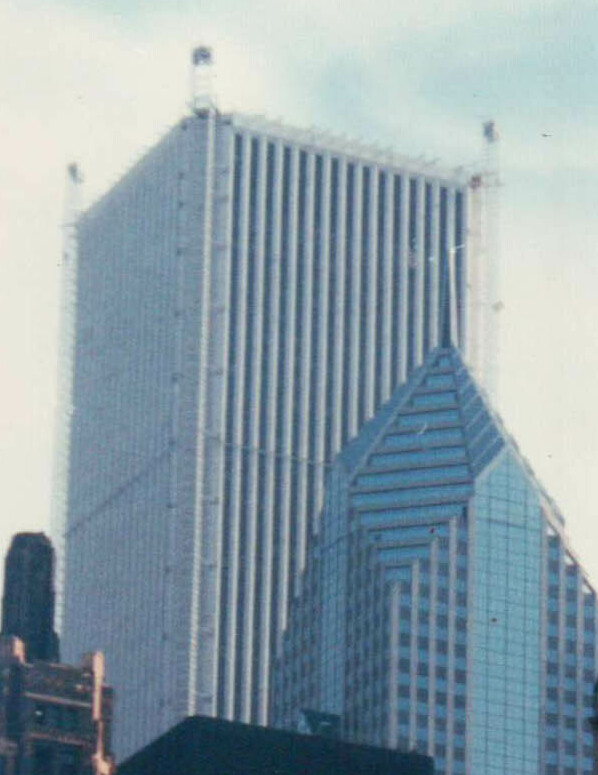
Aon Center in the 1990s during its refacing, with temporary work elevators erected in the building's corners

When completed, it was the world's tallest marble-clad building, sheathed entirely with 43,000 slabs of Italian Carrara marble. The marble used was thinner than previously attempted in cladding a building, which soon proved to be a mistake. On December 25, 1973, during construction a 350-pound marble slab detached from the façade and penetrated the roof of the nearby Prudential Center. In 1985, inspection found numerous cracks and bowing in the marble cladding of the building. To alleviate the problem, stainless steel straps were added to hold the marble in place. Later, from 1990 to 1992, the entire building was refaced with Mount Airy white granite at an estimated cost of over $80 million. Amoco was reluctant to divulge the actual amount, but it was well over half the original price of the building, without adjustment for inflation. Two-thirds of the discarded marble was crushed and used as landscaping decoration at Amoco's refinery in Whiting, Indiana, one-sixth was donated to Governors State University, in University Park, and one-sixth donated to Regalo, a division of Lashcon Inc. Under a grant from the Illinois Department of Rehabilitative Services, Regalo's 25 handicapped workers carved the discarded marble into a variety of specialty items such as corporate gifts and mementos including desk clocks and pen holders.

=== Designation ===
The Standard Oil Building was renamed the Amoco Building when the company changed names in 1985. In 1998, Amoco sold the building to The Blackstone Group for an undisclosed amount, estimated to be between $430 and $440 million. It was renamed as the Aon Center on December 30, 1999, although Aon would not become the building's primary tenant until September 2001. In May 2003, Wells Real Estate Investment Trust, Inc. acquired the building for between $465 and $475 million. On August 10, 2007, Wells Real Estate Investment Trust, Inc. changed its name to Piedmont Office Realty Trust, Inc.)

Real estate investors Mark Karasick and Victor Gerstein acquired the building from Piedmont in 2015 for $713 million.

=== Planned observation deck ===
On May 14, 2018, the building's owners unveiled a $185 million proposal for an observatory featuring a thrill ride on the roof called the Sky Summit, the world's tallest exterior elevator, and new entrance pavilion. The observatory was supposed to be completed in 2022, but the COVID-19 pandemic had been announced to have delayed construction plans by about a year.

== Position in Chicago's skyline (2006) ==
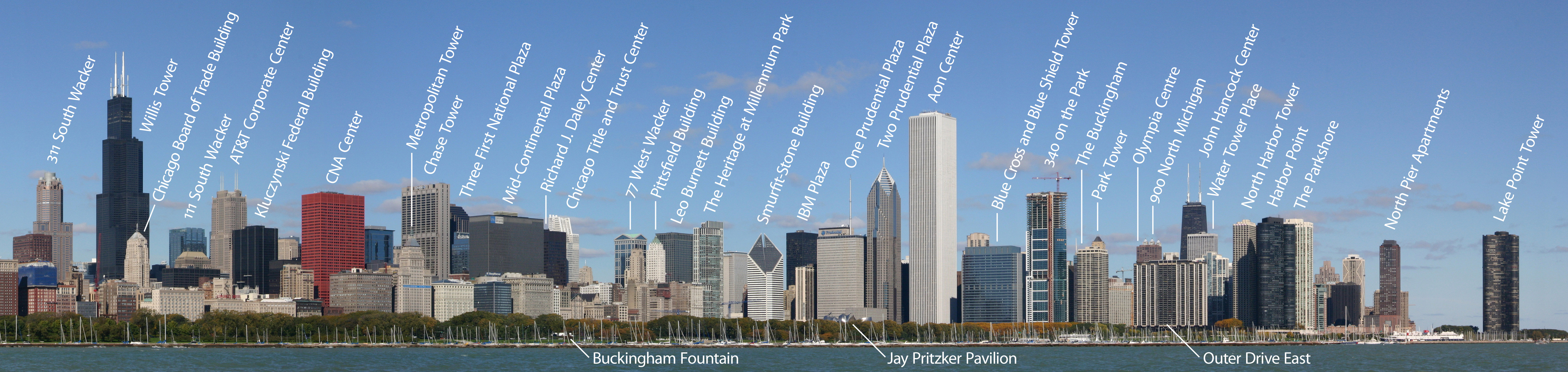

== Gallery ==
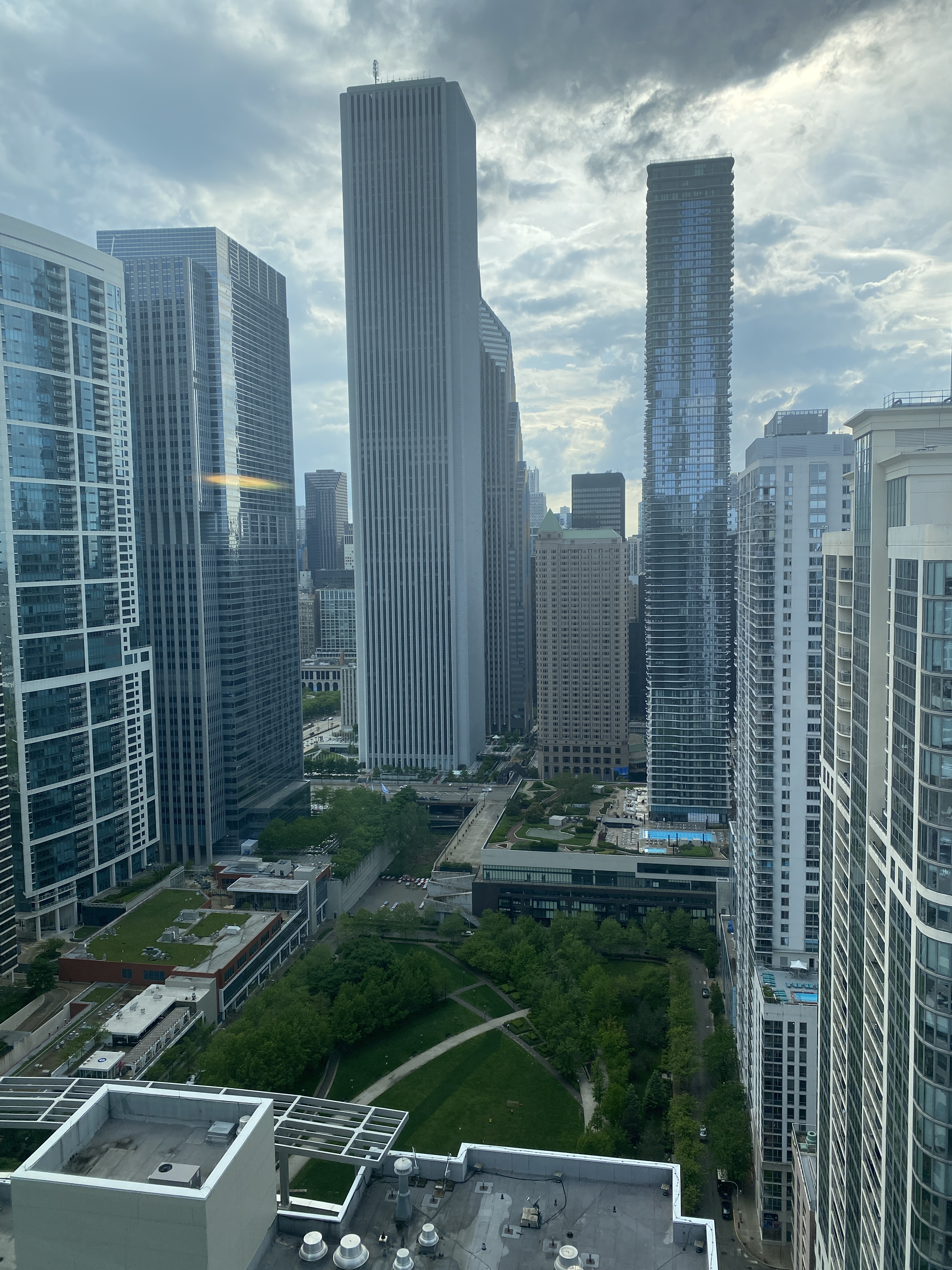
From the east

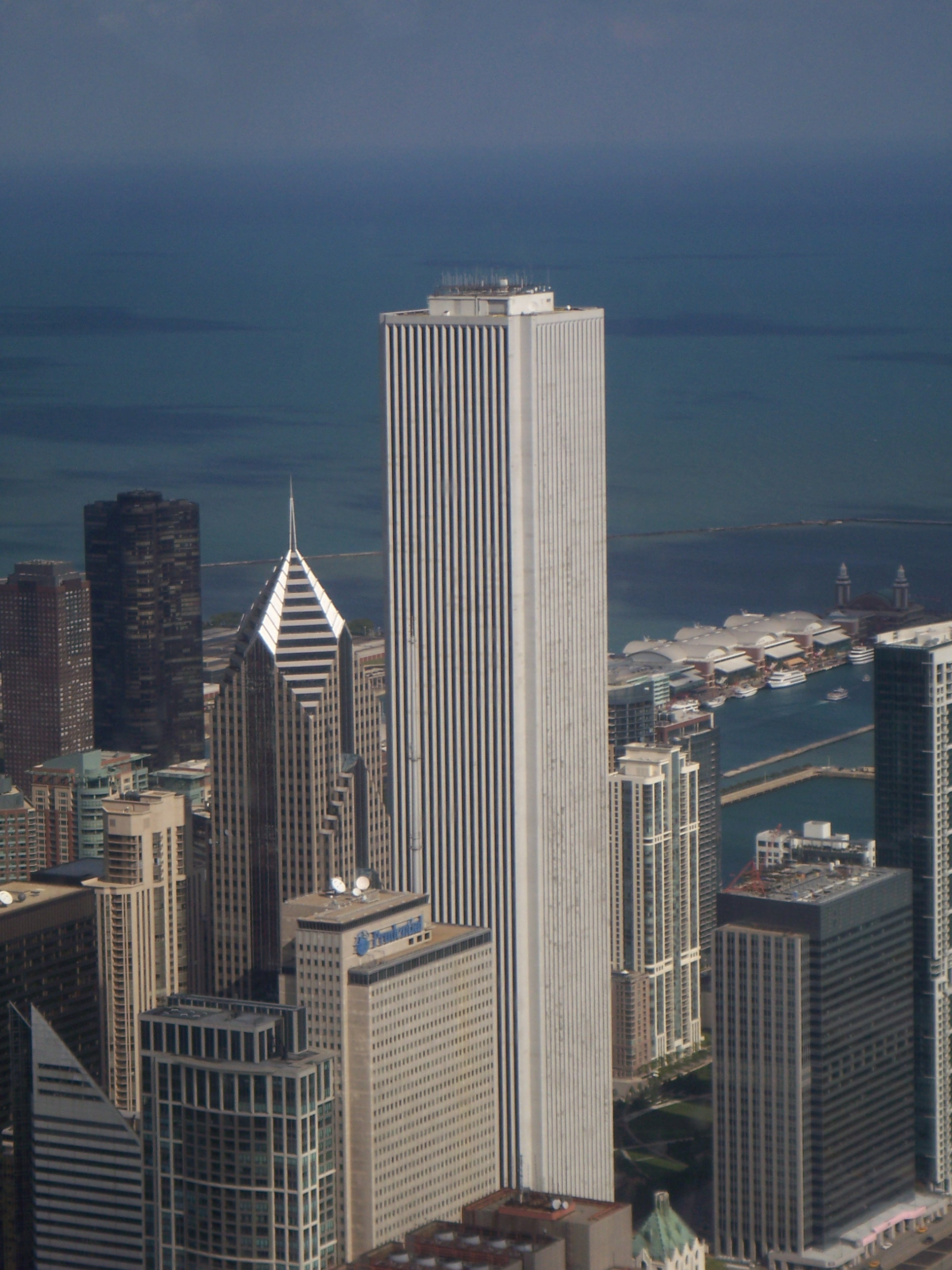
From the southwest

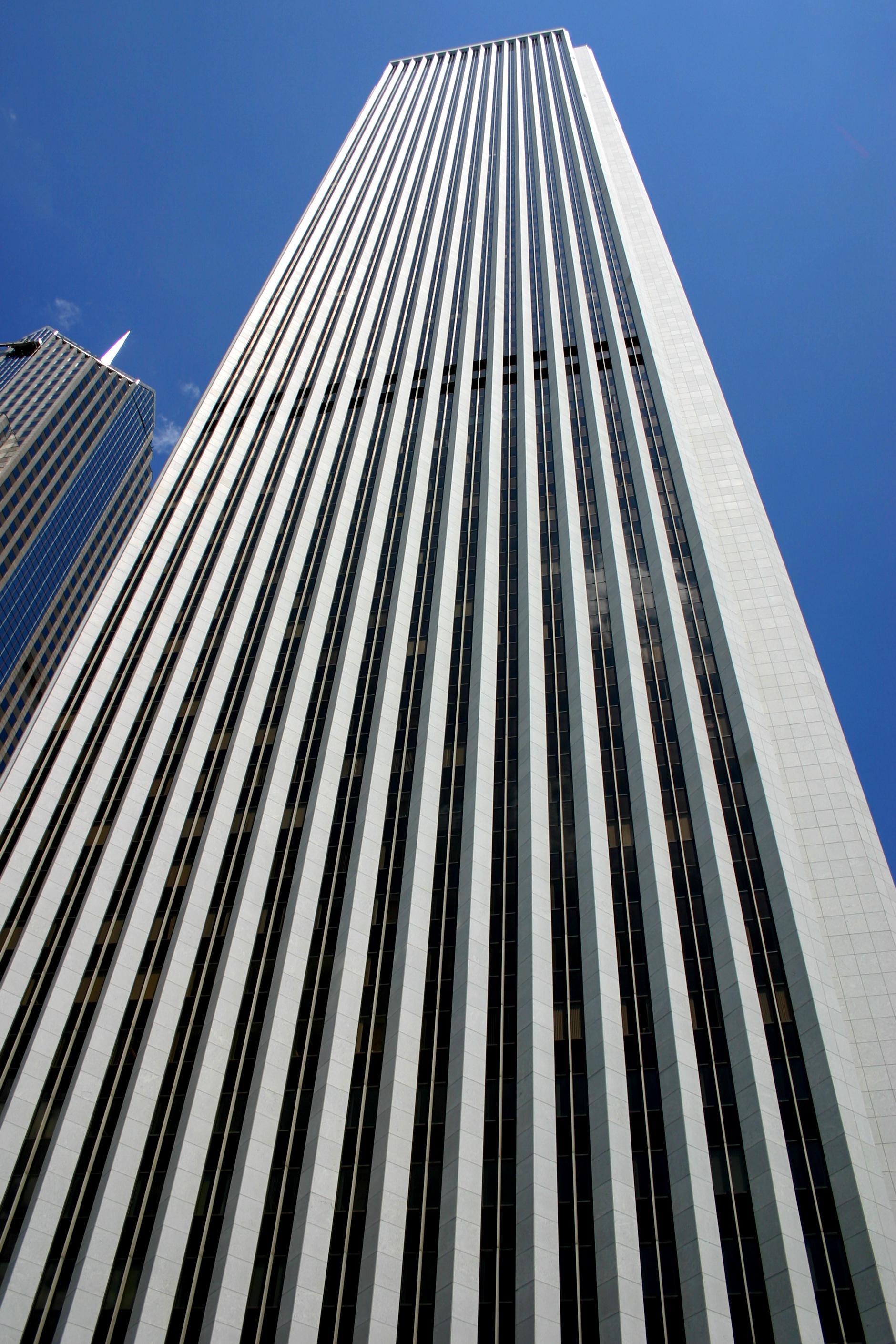
Looking up the building from the ground

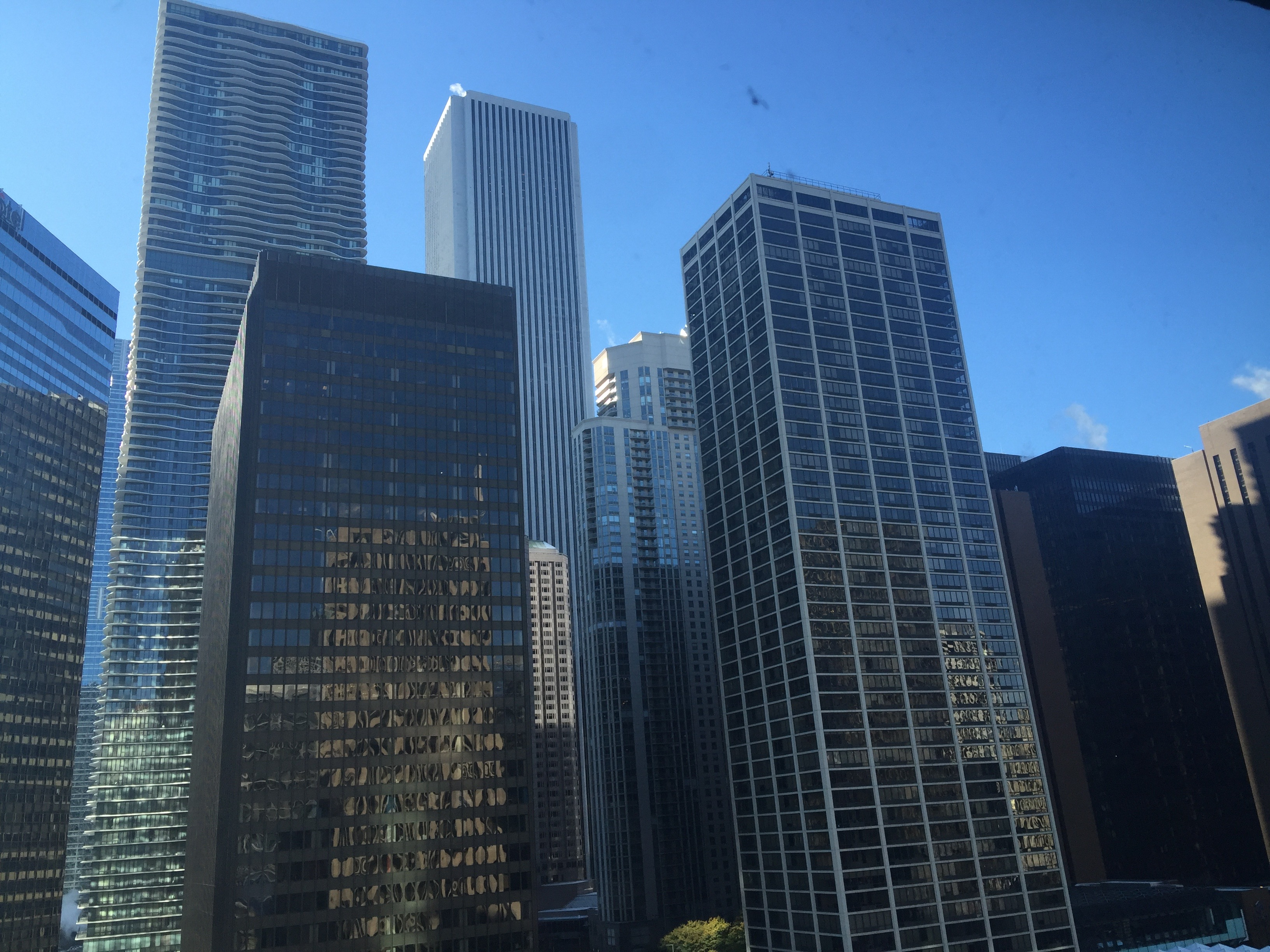
Looking from the North, with Aqua visible

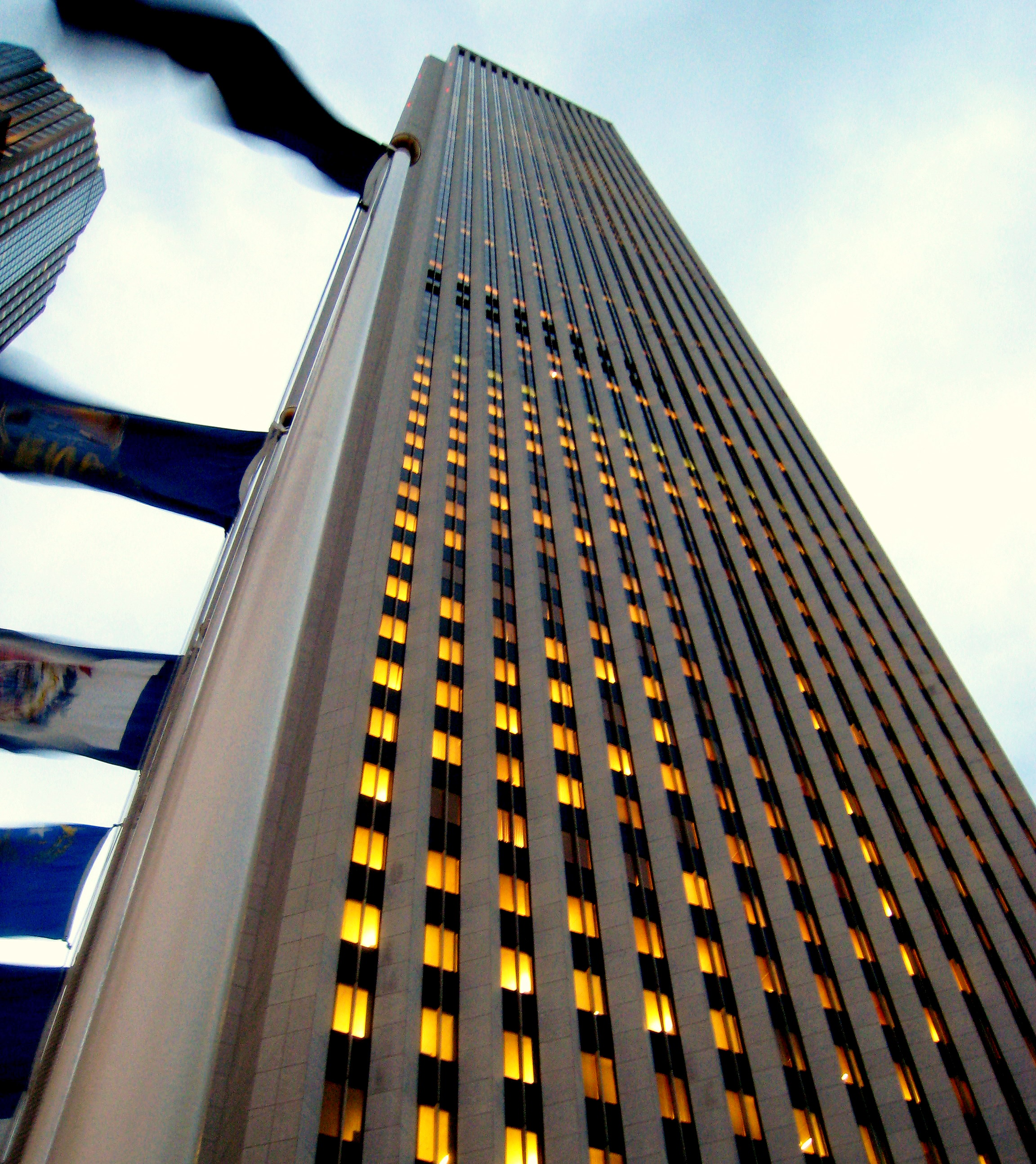
From the base

== See also ==
- Aon Center (Los Angeles)
- First Canadian Place – a similar building from the same architect
- List of buildings
- List of skyscrapers
- List of tallest buildings and structures in the world
- List of tallest buildings in Chicago
- List of tallest buildings in the United States
- List of tallest freestanding structures in the world
- List of tallest freestanding steel structures

Preceded by John Hancock Center	Tallest building in Chicago; 1972–1973; 1,136 ft	Succeeded by Willis Tower
Preceded by John Hancock Center	Tallest building in the United States outside of New York City; 1972–1973; 1,136 ft	Succeeded by Willis Tower
