= One Bayfront Plaza =

Proposed skyscraper in Miami, Florida

One Bayfront Plaza (New)
- Artist rendering of Miami skyline with One Bayfront Plaza in center
- Interactive map of the One Bayfront Plaza (New) area

General information
- Status: Approved
- Type: Office, retail, hotel, residential
- Location: 100 South Biscayne Boulevard, Miami, Florida
- Coordinates: 25.773537°N 80.187535°W
- Construction started: 2025
- Estimated completion: c. 2030

Height
- Roof: 1,049 ft (320 m)

Technical details
- Floor count: 93^{[A]}

Design and construction
- Architects: Kohn Pedersen Fox; TERRA Architecture
- Developer: Tibor Hollo & Associates; Florida East Coast Realty (FECR)

One Bayfront Plaza is a proposed supertall skyscraper in Miami, Florida, U.S. The building, construction of which has been approved, would stand at 1,049 feet (320 m), with 93 floors,^{[A]} becoming the tallest building in Miami and Florida. One Bayfront Plaza would primarily consist of offices and hotel space, but also would include a retail mall, condominiums, and parking garage on the lower levels, as well as possibly an observation deck at the top. The entire project consists of over 1,400,000 square feet (100,000 m^{2}) of Class A office and hotel space, as well as a total building area of over 4,000,000 square feet (371,612 m^{2}) including the large podium. One Bayfront Plaza is the first skyscraper over 1,000 feet (305 m) to be approved for construction in Miami. The building's primary advocate was real estate developer Tibor Hollo, who has won several awards for his 55 years as a developer in Miami, and was the president of Florida East Coast Realty.

One Bayfront Plaza has gone through several design revisions since its original proposal as a single, 80-floor, 1,180 feet (360 m) tower, which exceeded height restrictions. It was first approved as a complex of two connected towers as shown in the rendering below and was to be known as the 100 South Biscayne complex with the taller tower being 1,049 feet (320 m) high. The development was planned to include an adjacent, connected 850-room hotel tower referred to as 100 South Biscayne II. Both buildings in the complex had a scheduled groundbreaking in 2011, and were estimated to be completed by 2015. Most recent news suggests the development is back to a single 1,010-foot tower design with a large podium, which was given a possible 2014 groundbreaking; however, by 2014 it was stated that the project was being put off at least until the completion of FECR's under construction Panorama Tower in 2017.

== History ==
One Bayfront Plaza was originally proposed as a 1,180-foot (360 m) office and hotel tower. The design included 2,100,000 square feet (200,000 m^{2}) of office space, a 650-room hotel and a 3,000 space parking garage. However, due to the height limits for buildings in downtown Miami and the possibility of interference with aviation traffic going into and coming out of Miami International Airport, it was unlikely that the building would be approved for construction with the proposed height. The FAA conducted hundreds of impact surveys in the downtown area and negotiated with many building developers during the mid-2000s boom to lower the planned heights of their buildings. One example is 900 Biscayne Boulevard, located just a few blocks to the north of the OBP site, which was reduced from 700 feet (213 m) to 649 feet (198 m). The FAA reasoned that the skyscrapers interfered with their radar, in addition to being a physical hazard to landing planes. The redesigned One Bayfront Plaza was approved at its exceptional height of 1,049 feet due to its determination by the city as a significant landmark and because it got a Major Use Special Permit (MUSP).

We have a vision for an icon. As part of my legacy, I want to leave this city with a high-profile building on par with the Chrysler Building in New York or the Sears Tower in Chicago, a building that is home to major banks and law firms.

— Tibor Hollo, President of Florida East Coast Realty, 2007

In July 2007, a revised design of the building was released. The new design scaled back the height to 1,049 feet (320 m), and the floor count of the building was reduced to 70. The major feature of the new design was the incorporation of a separate hotel building to be located adjacent to the tower. The main tower was to be all office space. This revised design was subsequently approved by the City of Miami on July 25, 2007, but construction never began. In the fall of 2008, the building's height was scaled back again slightly due to new zoning laws to its current design as a single, 80-floor, 1,010-foot tower. The single tower would contain residential space at the bottom, accounting for the higher floor count.^{[A]} This design of the tower was to incorporate fluid dampers used to absorb wind gusts and create energy efficiency for the skyscraper. The tower was designed to resemble a sail to reflect the bay it overlooks.

In mid-2011 it was announced that the project was still alive and that the plan should be ready in 14 months. It was also announced that architectural firm Kohn Pedersen Fox had been chosen to work on the project to help TERRA Architecture with the design. The plan was released in early 2012 and included another redesign of the tower.

In 2016, the project was revived as a 93-story mixed-use building, with 1,000 parking spaces and a commitment to the Metromover connection.

=== Design and location ===
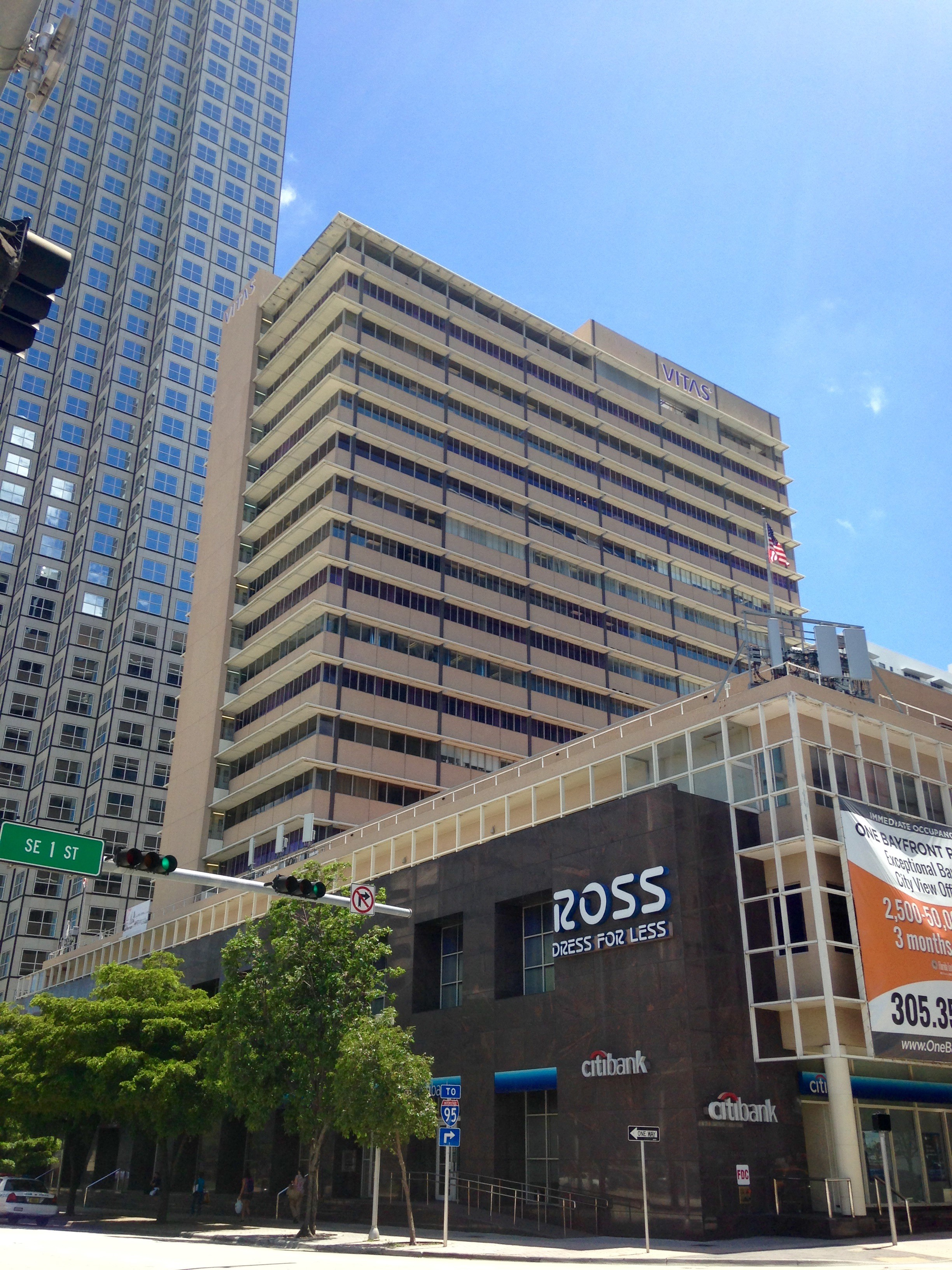
The original One Bayfront Plaza, completed in 1959. The building was demolished in 2025.

One Bayfront Plaza will be located at a waterfront site along Biscayne Boulevard, overlooking both Biscayne Bay and Bayfront Park. A pedestrian bridge will connect it to the Bayfront Park Metromover station located directly in front of it. The development will total 4,200,000 square feet (390,193 m^{2}), including 700 residential units, retail, and 650,000 square feet (60,387 m^{2}) of office space, as well as two hotels totaling over 600 rooms.

The groundbreaking of One Bayfront Plaza was scheduled to take place in 2011. The late construction date set at that point was mostly because of an already existing 18-story, 313,000-square-foot (29,079 m^{2}) building built circa 1959, also marketed as One Bayfront Plaza, stands on the 100 South Biscayne site, and was still a profitable office building. However, as recently as March 2011, three-year leases were being offered on the existing building, suggesting a new start date no earlier than 2014. In late 2012, it was reported that leases in the existing building ran until the end of 2014. The Florida East Coast Realty Group, the building's developer, estimates that the building will take no more than three years to complete, and had estimated an opening sometime in 2015.

By 2024, the existing building was still present but vacant, with demolition permits pending. The building was then covered in graffiti in March 2024, during Art Basel. Demolition on the original 1959 One Bayfront Plaza building began in 2025.

The 80th floor of the original design was planned to be an observation deck, the first one in Miami. The complex was later redesigned as two 70-floor towers, with the main tower being all office space, hence taller. The shorter tower was to be all hotel space. The current design goes back to a single mixed-use tower with 80 floors on a large podium with the top floors being office space and the bottom being hotel or residential space. The observation deck can be seen in the schematic diagram. Two FECR published sources have gone back to the floor count of 80 with the 1,010-foot design,^{[A]} and renderings of this design from 2009 show an observation deck, as well as the Metromover connection, in the blueprints.

=== Height ===
With a planned height of 1,005 feet (306 m), One Bayfront Plaza will likely become the tallest building in Miami upon completion. The tower is also the only building planned to rise over 1,000 feet (305 m) that has ever been approved in Miami. One Bayfront Plaza would surpass the 868-foot (265 m) Panorama Tower, which is currently the tallest building both in Miami and the state of Florida. At its original height of 1,180 feet, which exceeded FAA height restrictions and was never approved, it would have been one of the tallest buildings in the United States, and its second proposed height of 1,049 feet, which was approved in 2007 under old zoning, would have made it only slightly shorter than the Chrysler Building in New York by 1 foot (0.3 m). The height was reduced to its current 1,010 ft (308 m) due to height restrictions in the new Miami 21 zoning laws. In 2015, FAA height limits were set more clearly, again at a maximum of 1,049 feet (320 m), though One Bayfront Plaza had its approval renewed at 1,005 feet (306 m) AMSL, shorter than One Brickell City Center, approved at 1,049 feet (320 m).

== 100 South Biscayne II ==
100 South Biscayne II was the name of the proposed hotel tower that would have been located adjacent to the main One Bayfront Plaza tower in the 100 South Biscayne complex, connected at the bottom by the large retail area and parking garage making up the podium. The tower was planned to rise 823 ft (251 m) with 70 floors and would have consisted of an 850-room hotel with a 112,000-square-foot (10,400 m^{2}) convention center. 100 South Biscayne II was approved on July 25, 2007, and groundbreaking was scheduled to take place in 2011. It has been canceled as the final design scale back has remerged the development back into one mixed-use tower.

== See also ==
- List of tallest buildings in Miami
- Empire World Towers
- The Towers by Foster + Partners
- Waldorf Astoria Miami
- World Trade Center of the Americas
- One Brickell City Center
- Cipriani Residences
- SkyRise Miami

== Notes ==
A. ^ ^{a} ^{b} ^{c} ^{d} Due to several design revisions, sources are conflicting between 70 and 80 floors for the current 1,010-foot design. It is possible that the 1,049 design which was to be all office space with the hotel separate would only contain 70 floors while the current mixed use tower could reach 80 floors in less total height due to the smaller floor heights of residential space.
