= 1201 Brickell Bay Drive =

Residential condominiums

Villa Magna
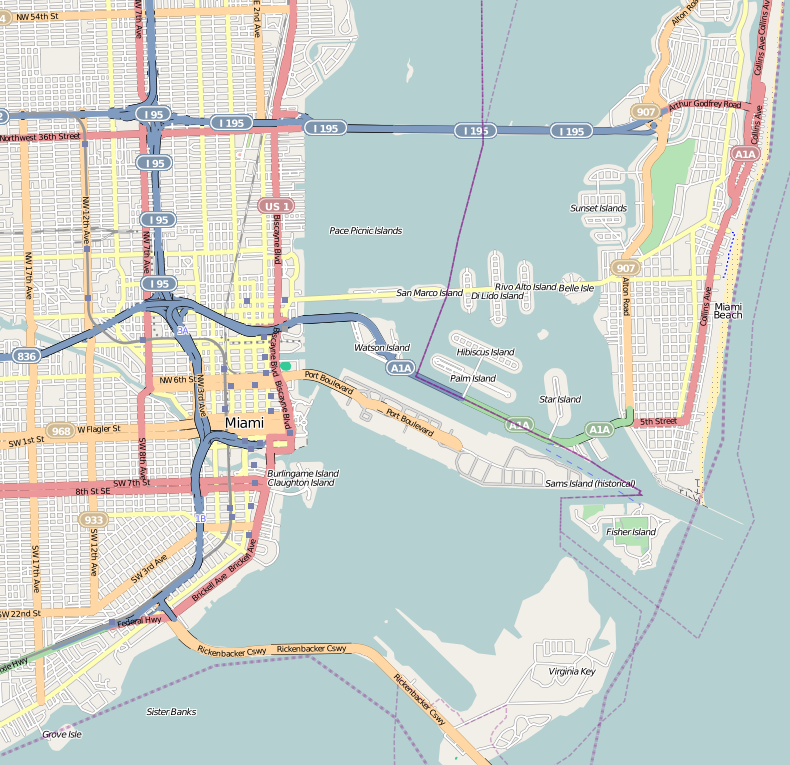
- Location within Central Miami Location within Florida

General information
- Status: Never built (original proposal)
- Type: Residential condominiums, hotel, retail (street level)
- Location: 1201 Brickell Bay Drive, Brickell, Miami, Florida; United States
- Coordinates: 25.7618°N 80.1918°W

Height
- Roof: 574 ft (175.0 m)

Technical details
- Floor count: 57

Design and construction
- Architect: Foster + Partners
- Developer: Tibor Hollo, Florida East Coast Realty Corigin Real Estate Group

1201 Brickell Bay Drive is a large waterfront property in the Brickell district of Greater Downtown Miami, Florida, which has remained undeveloped for several decades despite many high rise building developments proposed there in the 21st century.

In the 2000s building boom leading up to the Great Recesion, the Villa Magna Condominium Complex was an urban development that was planned to rise on the 2.5-acre (1.0-hectare) plot in Brickell, downtown Miami, Florida. It was approved in 2006 by the city council and the Federal Aviation Administration and construction was slated to begin in April 2007. The ending date was approximated to be late 2008 or early 2009; however, the housing crisis of the late 2000s halted the project.

The project was revived as The Towers by Foster + Partners in 2016, after FAA approval of supertall heights (>1,000 ft) on the property.

Finally, in the early 2020s the site was sold again to Citadel Group as part of a planned a move to Miami from Chicago. The new Citadel Tower was submitted to the FAA in late 2024 at the maximum height allowed in the area at 1,049 feet (320 m). While this new headquarters was in development, Citadel briefly moved to the Southeast Financial Center building in downtown in 2022, then to 830 Brickell in 2024. Site work began on this project in 2026, and received media attention in September 2026 when a drilling rig crane collapsed onto the adjacent road and several parked cars.

== History ==
The complex was to feature two twin towers, Villa Magna Condominiums I and Villa Magna Condominiums II. Both were to be 574 feet (175 m) tall with 57 floors. The complex was to be connected by the Villa Magna Plaza at the base of both towers. It was to be located at 1201 Brickell Bay Drive near Southeast 12th Street in Miami's Brickell neighborhood. The buildings were planned be used entirely for residential purposes, with the complex containing 780 condominium units. However, in 2007 the developers changed the plans to include more hotel, retail, and commercial space in realization of the quickly declining housing market at the time. The complex was then approved under a major use special permit.

== Revival ==
In 2011, the project plans were rumored to have been revived.

In 2015, the height of the project was approved up to 995 feet (303 m).

=== The Towers by Foster + Partners ===
In 2016, the FAA approved supertall heights up to 1,040 feet (320 m) above ground level for the site and it was said that Foster + Partners was designing the building. In November 2016, new rendering were revealed for the project, renamed The Towers by Foster + Partners, again a twin tower project, but much taller and with 660 units. The new design features more mixed-use and public space at the base, with much of the parking underground, a difficult task in Miami due to very low elevation. The design would feature a public arcade running through the block to the Baywalk as well as 56,800 square feet (5,280 m^{2}) of open space. The buildings would be the tallest buildings in Miami, beating FECR's own under construction 850-foot (260 m) Panorama Tower two blocks north on Brickell Bay Drive. FECR sold the site in 2022.

=== Ken Griffin and Citadel HQ ===
From 2019 to 2025, billionaire Kenneth C. Griffin of Citadel Inc. purchased several Miami area residences, as well as the 1201 Brickell Bay Drive site, propsosing a new Citadel corporate headquarters tower there at the maximum FAA permitted height of 1,049 feet (320 m) above sea level. Site work began in 2026, during which a drilling crane collapsed onto the road in September 2026.

== See also ==
- List of tallest buildings in Miami
