= Empire World Towers =

- Rendered Model of the Empire World Towers without dozens of surrounding towers built in the 2000s.
- Interactive map of the Empire World Towers area

General information
- Status: Never built
- Type: Residential
- Location: 330 Biscayne Boulevard, Miami, Florida, United States
- Coordinates: 25°46′39″N 80°11′20″W

Height
- Roof: 1,022 ft (312 m)

Technical details
- Floor count: 93

Design and construction
- Architect: Kobi Karp Architecture
- Developer: Maclee Development

The Empire World Towers were two proposed supertall skyscrapers to have been built in Miami, Florida, United States. The complex consisted of the Empire World Tower I and the Empire World Tower II. Both towers would have stood at 1,022 feet (312 m), with 93 stories each. They would surpass the Panorama Tower and become the city and state's tallest buildings, since the approved One Bayfront Plaza had been reduced to a height of 1,010 ft. The towers were cancelled and never built, and in 2023 the supertall Waldorf Astoria Miami began construction on the same block at 300 Biscayne Boulevard.

== History ==
Had they have been approved, constructed, and completed in the original proposed timeline, the towers would have surpassed Queensland 1 as the world's tallest all-residential buildings, until the completion of the Chicago Spire, but ultimately fall well short of the 1,550 feet (472 m) Central Park Tower.

=== Height ===
The Empire World Towers were originally proposed to rise 1,200 feet (366 m) and 106 stories.

In December 2007, the height of the towers was decreased to 1,022 feet (312 m). It is probable that the height decrease was brought on due to the concerns raised by the Federal Aviation Administration about the proposed buildings' heights.

== See also ==
- List of tallest buildings in Miami
- Waldorf Astoria Miami
