= Cipriani Residences Miami =

Skyscraper in Miami, Florida, U.S.

- Former names: Capital at Brickell

General information
- Status: Topped-out
- Type: Residential
- Location: 1420 South Miami Avenue, Miami, Florida, United States
- Coordinates: 25.7601°N 80.1939°W
- Construction started: 2024
- Estimated completion: 2028

Height
- Roof: 950 ft (290 m)

Technical details
- Floor count: 80

Design and construction
- Architect: Arquitectonica
- Developer: Mast Capital

Website
- ciprianiresidencesmiami.com

Cipriani Residences Miami is a mixed-use residential skyscraper currently under construction in the Brickell neighborhood of Miami, Florida, United States. The site is bounded by South Miami Avenue to the east, SW 14th Terrace to the south, SW 1st Avenue to the west, and SW 14th Street to the north. It is currently the tallest building in Miami and the tallest residential building in the United States south of New York City.

Construction began in October 2024 on an 80-story Cipriani-branded tower. In 2026, the under construction tower surpassed the height of Panorama Tower, becoming the tallest building in Miami until the Waldorf Astoria Miami tops out in 2027.

== History ==
The current site of Cipriani Residences has seen various proposals for a major skyscraper since the 2000s.

=== Capital at Brickell ===
Capital at Brickell was a proposed complex of two skyscrapers. The site broke ground in 2006. The project was cancelled due to financial reasons caused by the Great Recession. The complex was to consist of two towers made up of residential, office, a hotel and retail, "Capital at Brickell Tower I" and "Capital at Brickell Tower II." Tower II will be the taller one, rising to a height of 806 feet (246 m). Tower I was to be 607 feet (185 m) tall, and will be located to the south of Tower II.

Tower I was to be 53 floors and Tower II was to be 57 floors. Although not the tallest buildings proposed during the first Miami "Manhattanization wave" from 2006-2008, the towers were planned become architecturally striking, and would have surpassed the Four Seasons Hotel Miami as the city's tallest building at the time. Both towers were designed to be reminiscent of the Chrysler Building in New York City. The tops of the buildings were especially similar, with a "crown" at the top of each building and a similar spire. The towers were part of the recent push to build more skyscrapers in the western side of the Brickell neighborhood, which does not border Biscayne Bay as does most of Downtown Miami.

The architect of the complex was Fullerton-Diaz Architects, Inc. The developer was Cabi Developers, which was led by VP of Development Miroslav "Misha" Mladenovic. In July 2011, the two developers began competing for the lot.

=== CCCC Miami ===
In December 2014, the site was sold for $74.74 million to China City Construction Corp, an affiliate of China Communications Construction Company. In 2015 it was revealed that they planned a redesign, aiming to build the tallest building in Miami and that it could largely be an office space, though it would be mixed-use. They were seeking EB-5 funding to cover part of the expected $875 million cost.

=== Cipriani Residences Miami ===
In the 2020s, the project was revived again by Mast Capital as a three tower development with the tallest being about 900 feet (270 m), which would make it the second tallest building in Miami, pending the completion of the 1,040-foot (320 m) Waldorf Astoria Miami in 2026. In October 2024, construction began on the main 80-story tower. The tower surpassed the height of Panorama Tower in 2026, briefly becoming the tallest building in Miami before the Waldorf tower tops out in 2027.

== Gallery ==
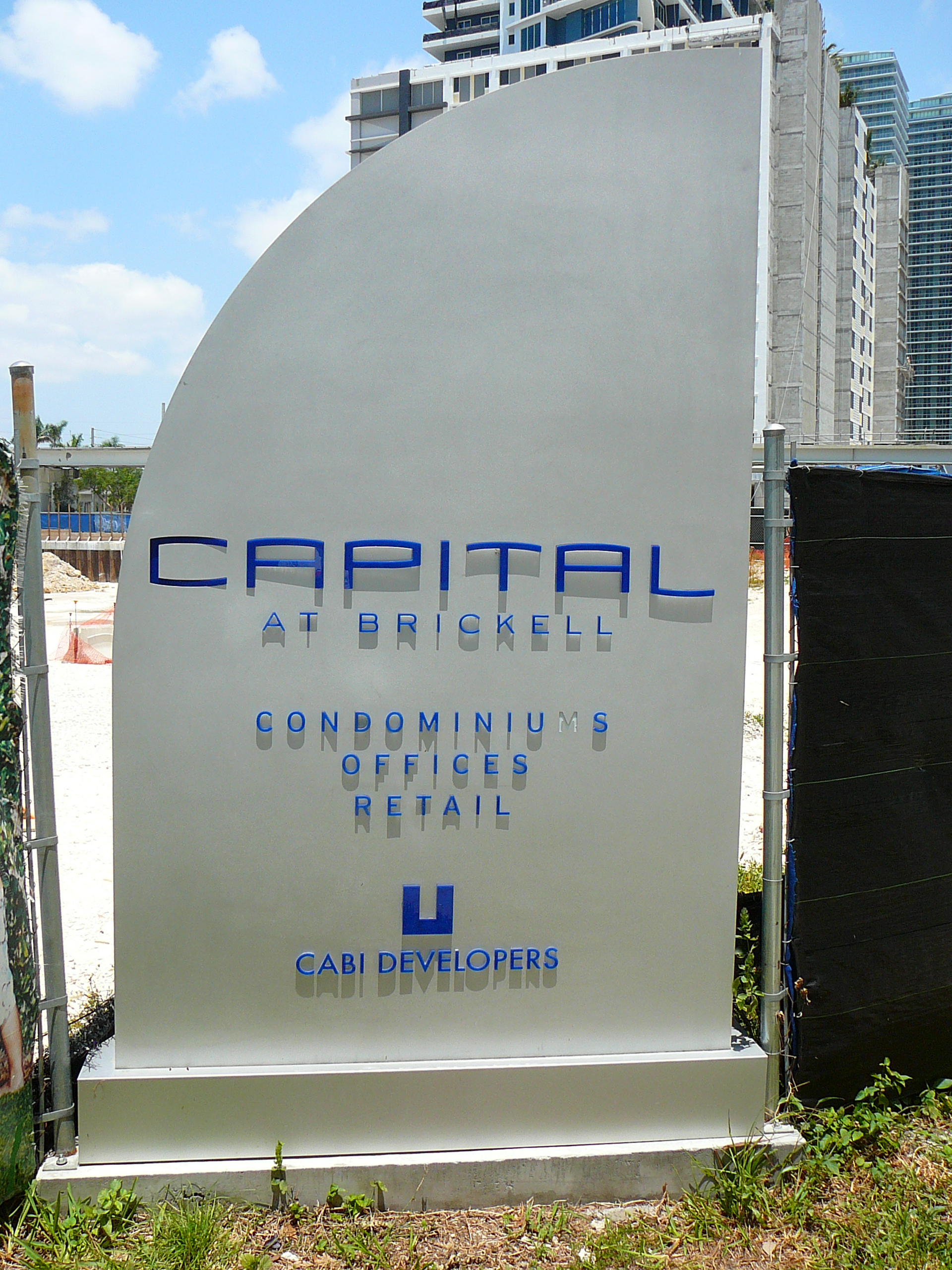
The future site of Capital at Brickell as of May 2008

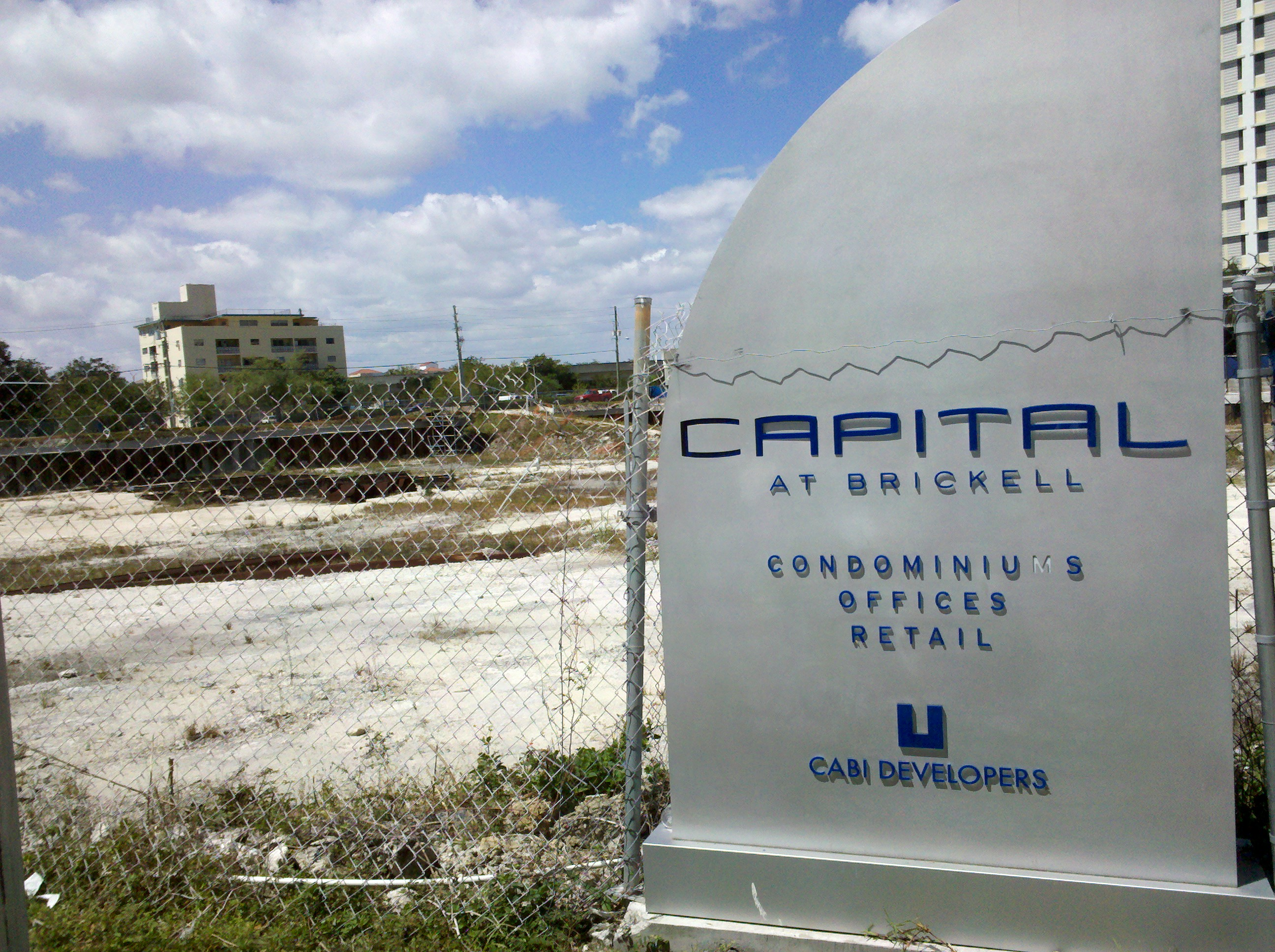
The same sign three years later in March 2011

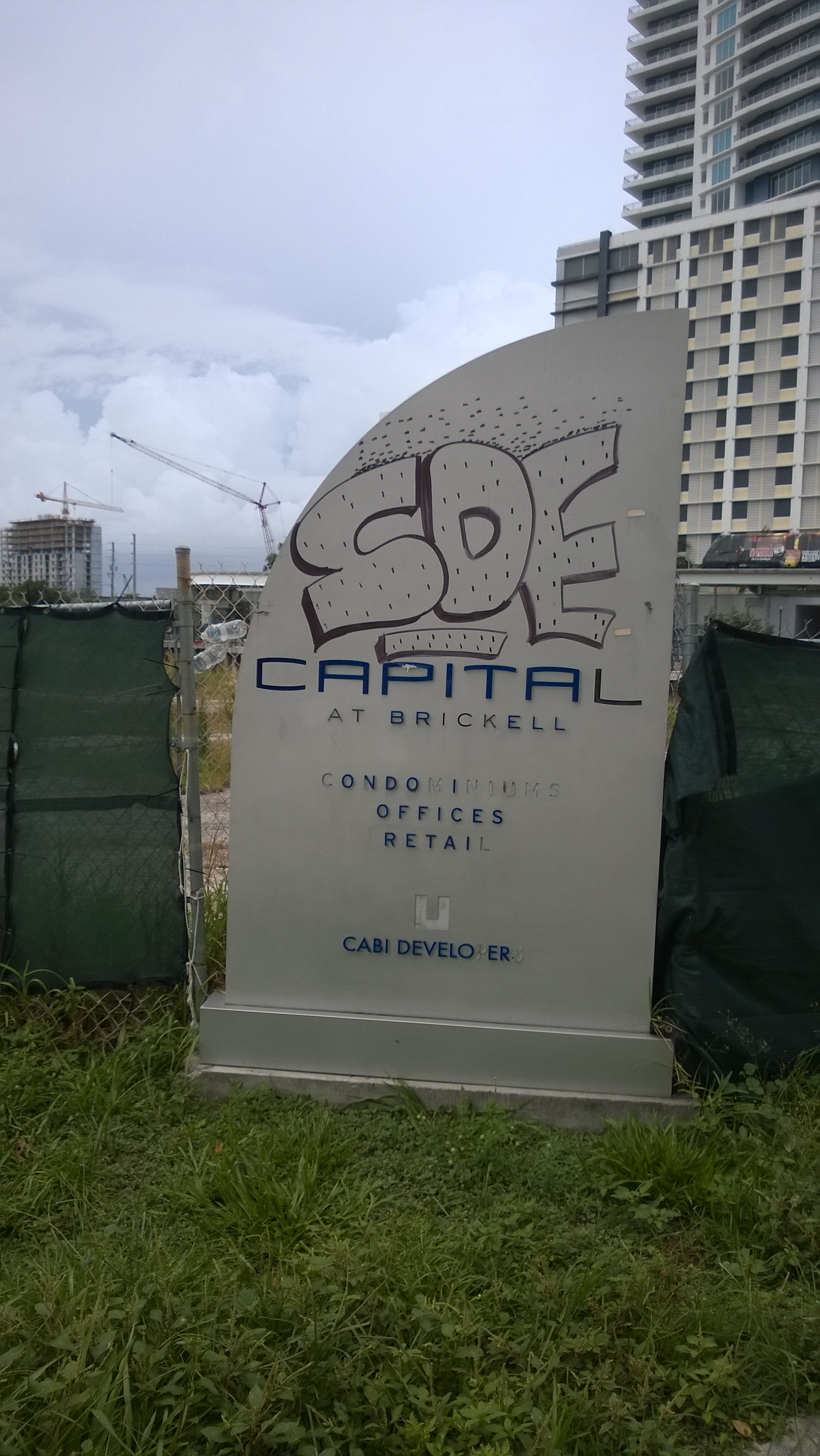
The same sign six years later in July 2014

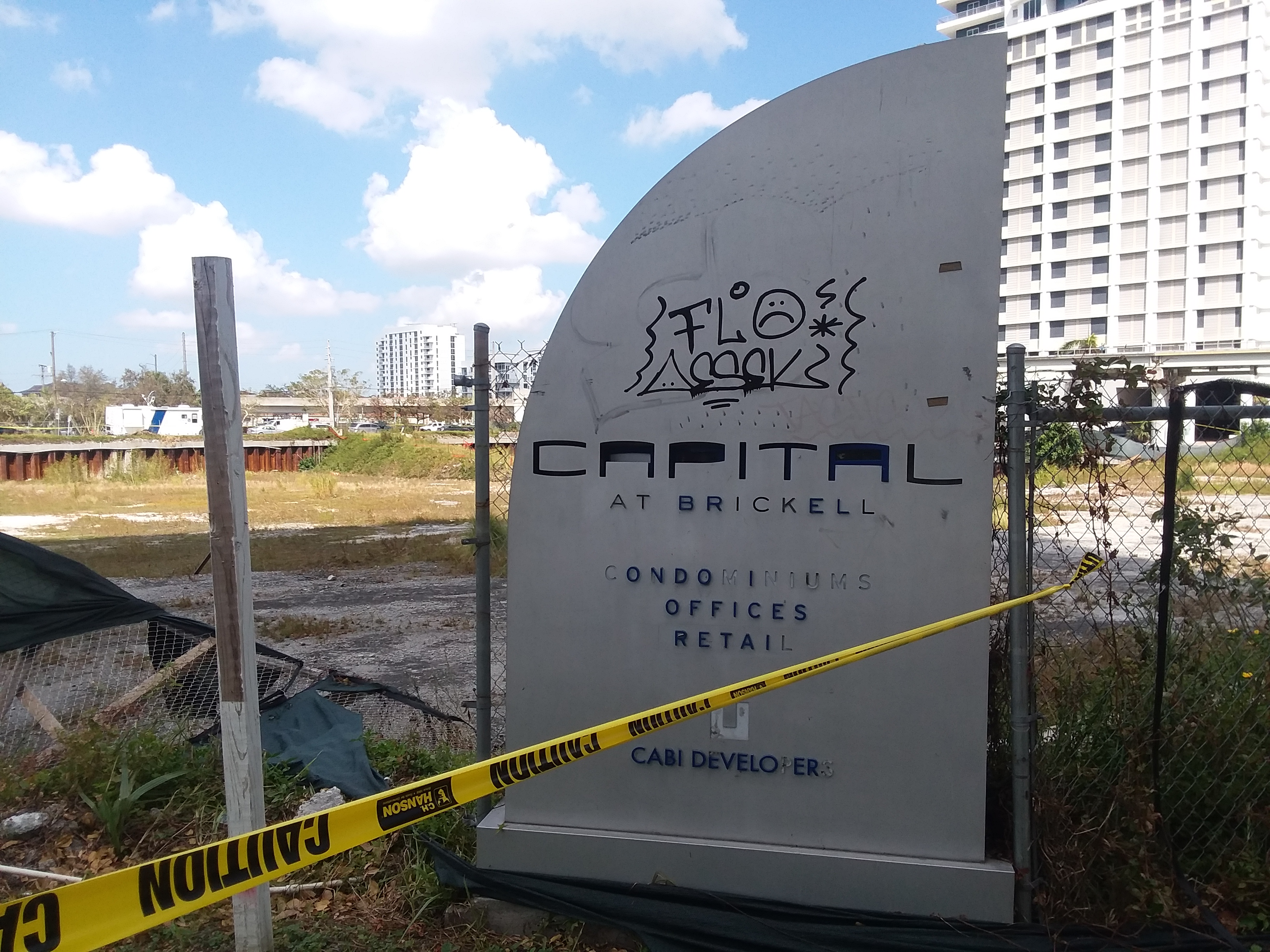
the same sign nine years later in September 2017 after Hurricane Irma.

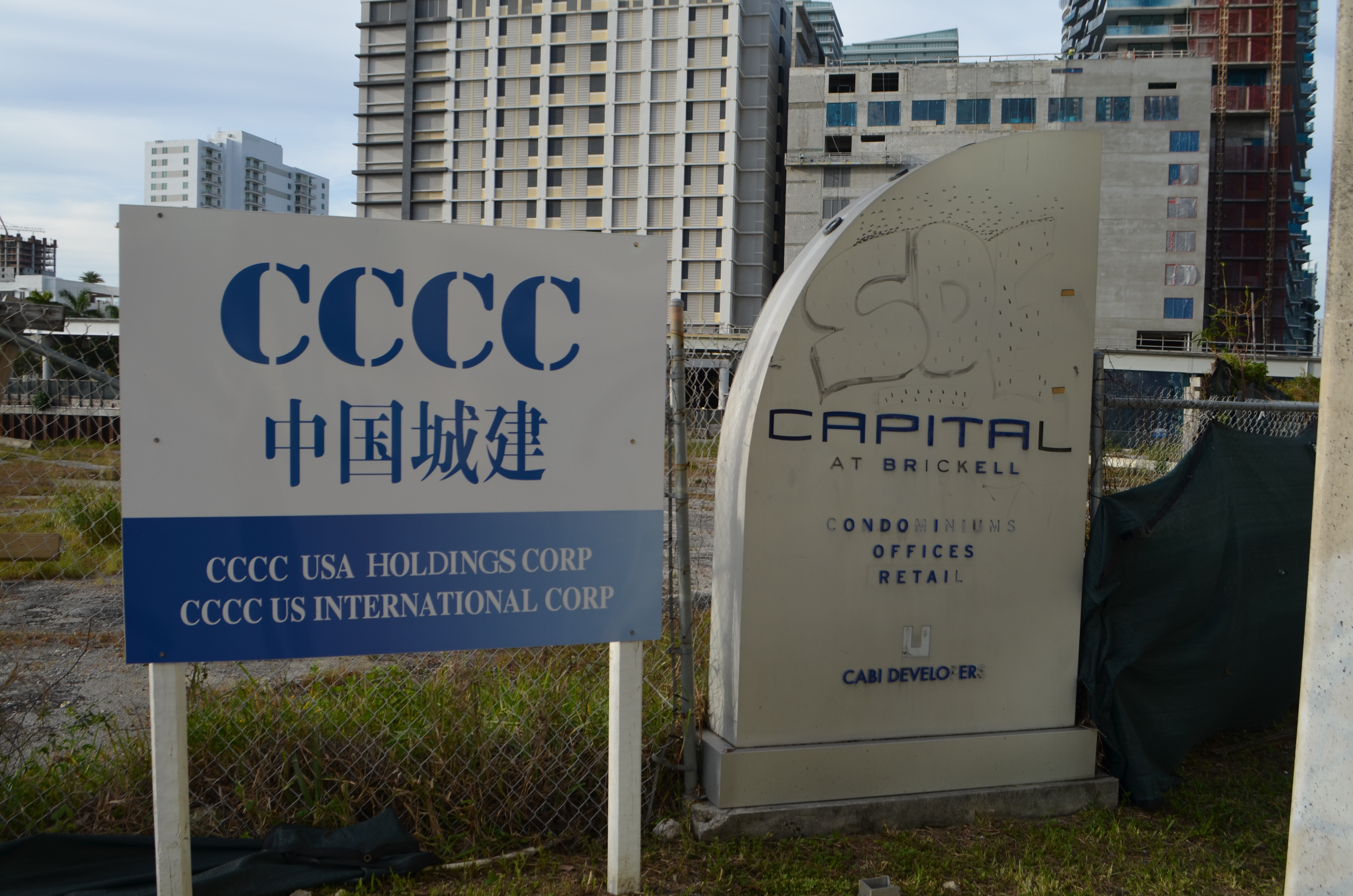
CCCC sign was briefly with the old Capital sign in 2016

== See also ==
- List of tallest buildings in Miami

Records
Preceded by Panorama Tower	Tallest building in Miami; 2026–present 290 m	Succeeded by Incumbent
Preceded by Panorama Tower	Tallest building in Florida; 2026–present 290 m	Succeeded by Incumbent
