= One Brickell City Centre =

Skyscraper in Miami, Florida

- Interactive map of the One Brickell City Centre area

General information
- Status: Currently Cancelled
- Type: Conference, hotel, observation, office, parking garage, retail
- Location: 700 Brickell Avenue, Miami Florida, United States
- Coordinates: 25.7667913°N 80.1911518°W
- Construction started: 2023

Height
- Roof: 1,040 ft (317 m)

Technical details
- Floor count: 80

Design and construction
- Architect: Arquitectonica
- Developer: Swire Properties

Website
- brickellcitycentre.com

One Brickell City Centre is a cancelled 80 story, 1,040 ft (317 m) office skyscraper in the city of Miami, Florida. The tower would be part of the existing nine-acre Brickell City Centre development. If It had been built, One Brickell City Centre would have been the tallest building in Miami and the Southeastern United States, surpassing the Bank of America Plaza in Atlanta. It would have also surpassed the height of the not yet constructed One Bayfront Plaza, which is approved at 1,010 ft (308 m) tall. Demolition on the existing structure is still underway as of January 2024.

== History ==
In 2013, it was reported that if built the project would not be completed until at least 2018 and will cost roughly $1 billion U.S.D. to build. The building was originally proposed at 1,102 feet (336 m), but was later reduced to 1,040 feet (320 m), and may be reduced further due to a Notice of Presumed Hazard letter from the FAA. The FAA has finally approved the 80-story height of One Brickell City Centre, which is now set to become one of the tallest buildings in the country.

In January 2015 the FAA announced that they would try to block the project unless they cut the height to 475 ft, though this was never finalized. June 24, 2015 federal officials determined a height of 1,040 feet above ground level, or 1,049 feet above sea level wouldn't pose a hazard to air navigation, and the project would legally be allowed to continue.

The plans were for a mixed use building with 67,000 square feet (6,225 m^{2}) of retail, 677,000 square feet (62,895 m^{2}) of Class A office space, 256 condominiums, and 120 hotel rooms. It is part of the mixed-use nine-acre Brickell City Centre development. The tower would also include a lounge on the 80th floor and a restaurant on the 79th floor.

The tower was redesigned in 2022 to be all office space. In 2023, demolition permits for the existing building were granted, and in January 2024, demolition is still underway. In March 2024, the building's developers have yet to secure an anchor tenant.

== Design ==
It would have been on Brickell Avenue adjacent to SW Eighth Street, and connected to the modified Eighth Street Metromover station as part of the first phase of Brickell City Centre. The 2022 redesign is for an all-office tower with 1.6 million square feet (148,600 m2) of space.

== Cancellation ==
In February 18, 2025 the Council of Urban Buildings and Habitat stated that the tower was cancelled as the developers didn't secure pre-leasing commitments of the project. That lead the building's developers to halt the project and remove their equipment from the building's site. Now, the developers of the tower have concentrated on building other projects in the city of Miami.

== See also ==
- List of tallest buildings in Miami
