= Four Seasons Hotel Miami =

Mixed-use skyscraper in Miami, Florida

Four Seasons Hotel and Tower
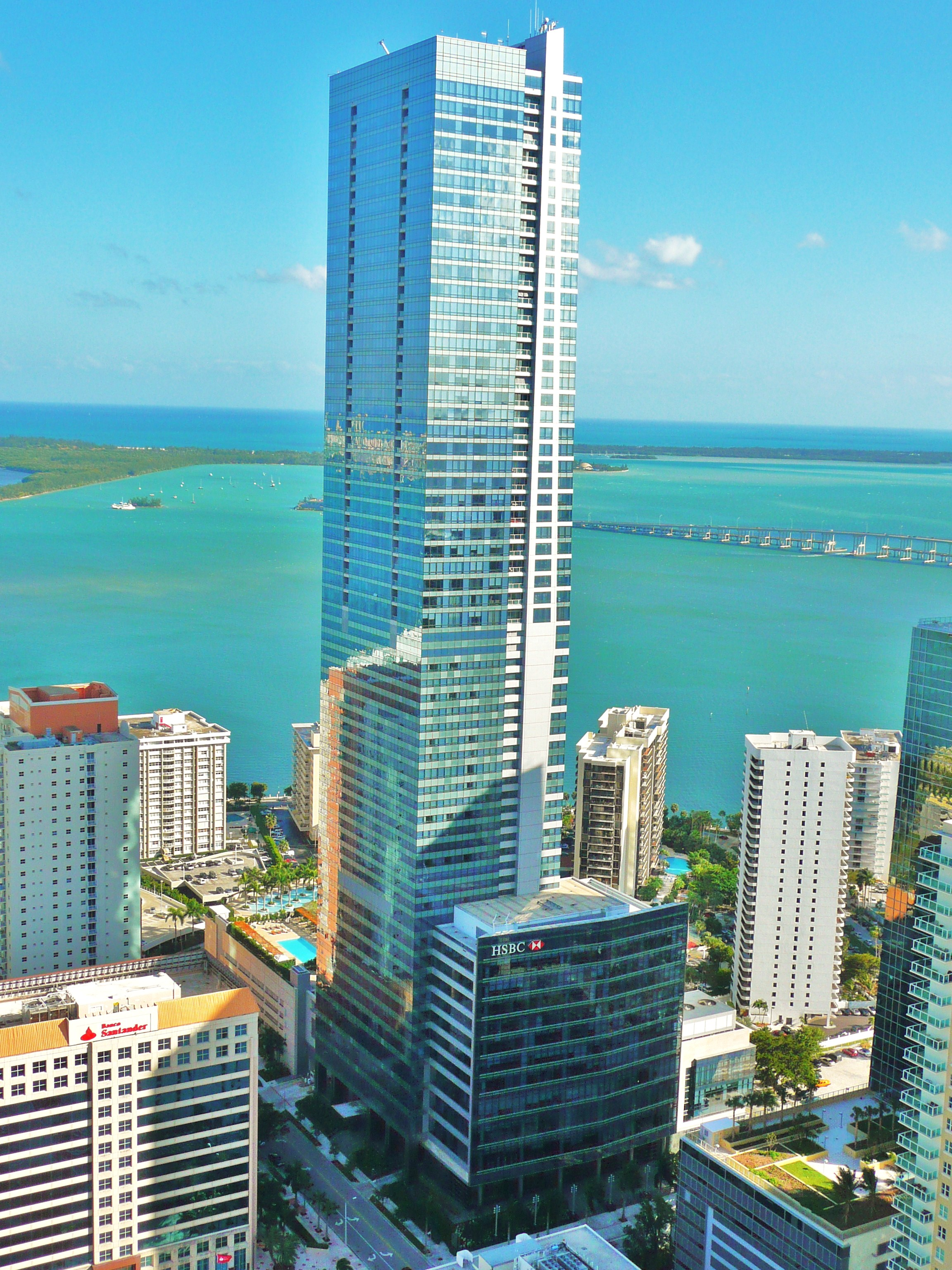
- Four Seasons Hotel and Tower, Miami, February 2010

- Location within Florida
- Alternative names: Millennium Tower

General information
- Type: Hotel, office, residential (mixed-use)
- Location: 1435 Brickell Avenue, Miami, Florida, United States
- Coordinates: 25°45′31″N 80°11′29″W
- Construction started: 2000
- Completed: 2003
- Opening: 2003
- Cost: $280 million

Height
- Tip: 800 ft (240 m)
- Antenna spire: 800 ft (240 m)
- Roof: 781 ft (238 m)

Technical details
- Floor count: 70

Design and construction
- Architect: Handel Architects
- Developer: Millennium Partners MDA Associates
- Structural engineer: DeSimone Consulting Engineers

Website
- fourseasons.com/miami/

The Four Seasons Hotel and Tower, also known as the Four Seasons Hotel Miami, is a 70-story, 781 feet (238 m) skyscraper in Miami, Florida. Located in downtown Miami's Brickell Financial District, it is the fourth tallest building in Miami and in Florida. The tower contains a Four Seasons Hotel property, office space, and several residential condominium units on the upper floors.

The building was planned by Gary Edward Handel & Associates and Bermello Ajamil & Partners, Inc. Post-tensioning reinforcement of the structure was supplied and engineered by Suncoast Post-Tension. The building was constructed with dense steel reinforcing and silica-fume concrete, and is designed to sustain hurricane-force winds. Construction began in 2000, and the building was completed in 2003. The Four Seasons held the title of the tallest building in Miami and Florida until the Panorama Tower surpassed it in 2017.

== Specifications ==
- It surpassed Southeast Financial Center as the tallest building in Miami and Florida.
- The tower has 230,000 square feet (21,000 m^{2}) of Class A office space from floors 8 to 17. They are mostly occupied by HSBC Bank USA.
- There are three lobbies. Two separate lobbies on the first floor and one on the seventh floor. The separate first floor lobbies are for the office/health club portion of the tower and the residences. The seventh floor lobby is for the hotel and conference areas.
- Part of the seventh floor lobby is a two-acre (8,000 m^{2}) outdoor pool terrace, situated atop the six floor, 934 spaces parking garage.
- The Four Seasons Hotel guest rooms occupies floors 20 to 29. The hotel contains 221 rooms and 84 condo/hotel units. The condo/hotel units range from 611 to 2,062 square feet (57 to 192 m^{2}).
- A total of 186 luxury condominiums occupy floors 40 to 70. They range from 1,114 to 6,499 square feet (103 to 604 m^{2}).
- The tower contains 10,600 square feet (985 m^{2}) of retail space.
- Total construction costs were US$379 million.
- The tower has a total floor area of 1.8 million square feet (167,000 m^{2}).
- A 50,000 square feet (4,600 square metres) fitness center called Equinox also occupies the tower.
- The building's total building area stands at 690,000 square feet (64,000 m^{2}).

== Gallery ==
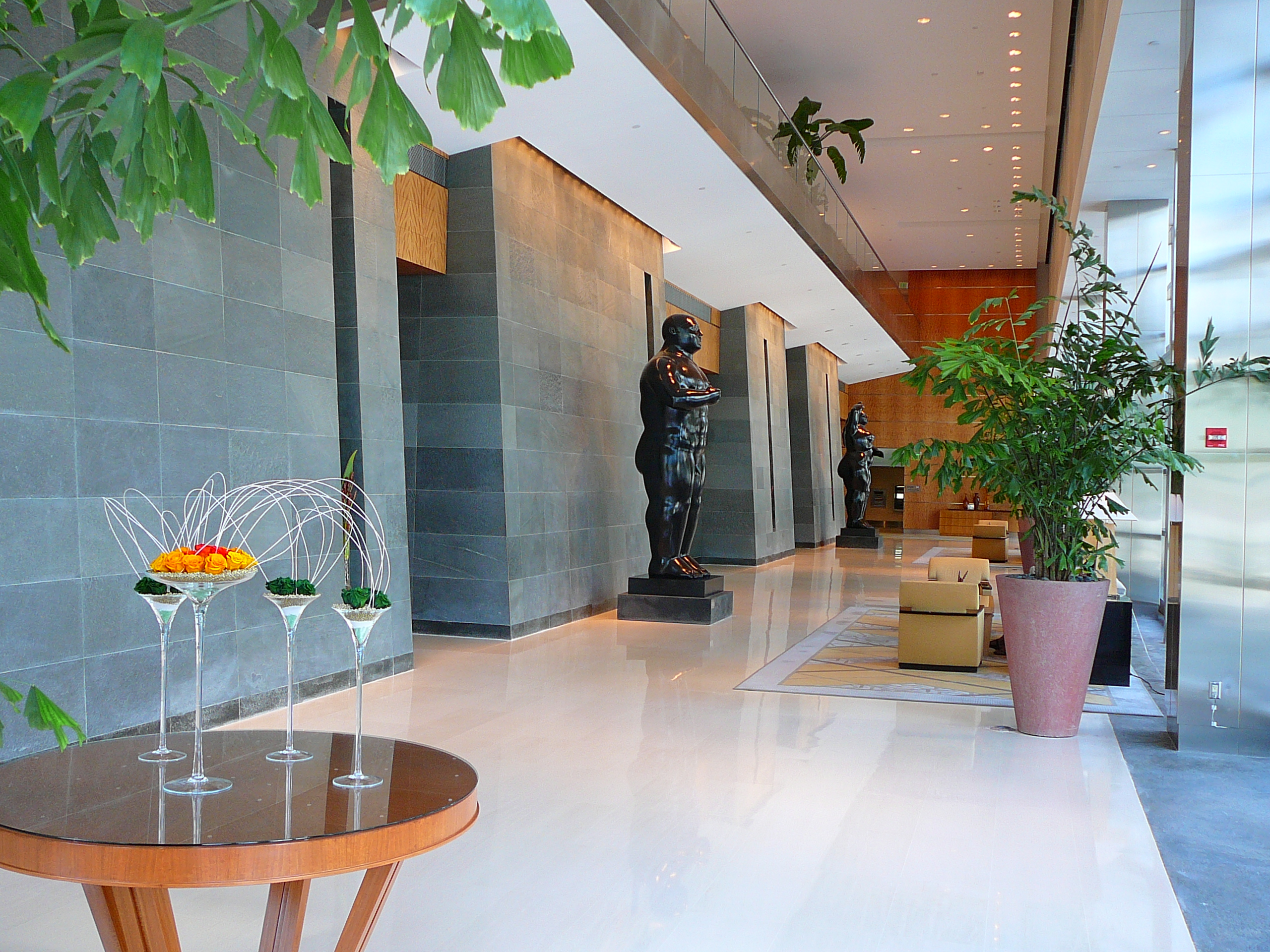
Main entrance to tower with Botero decor

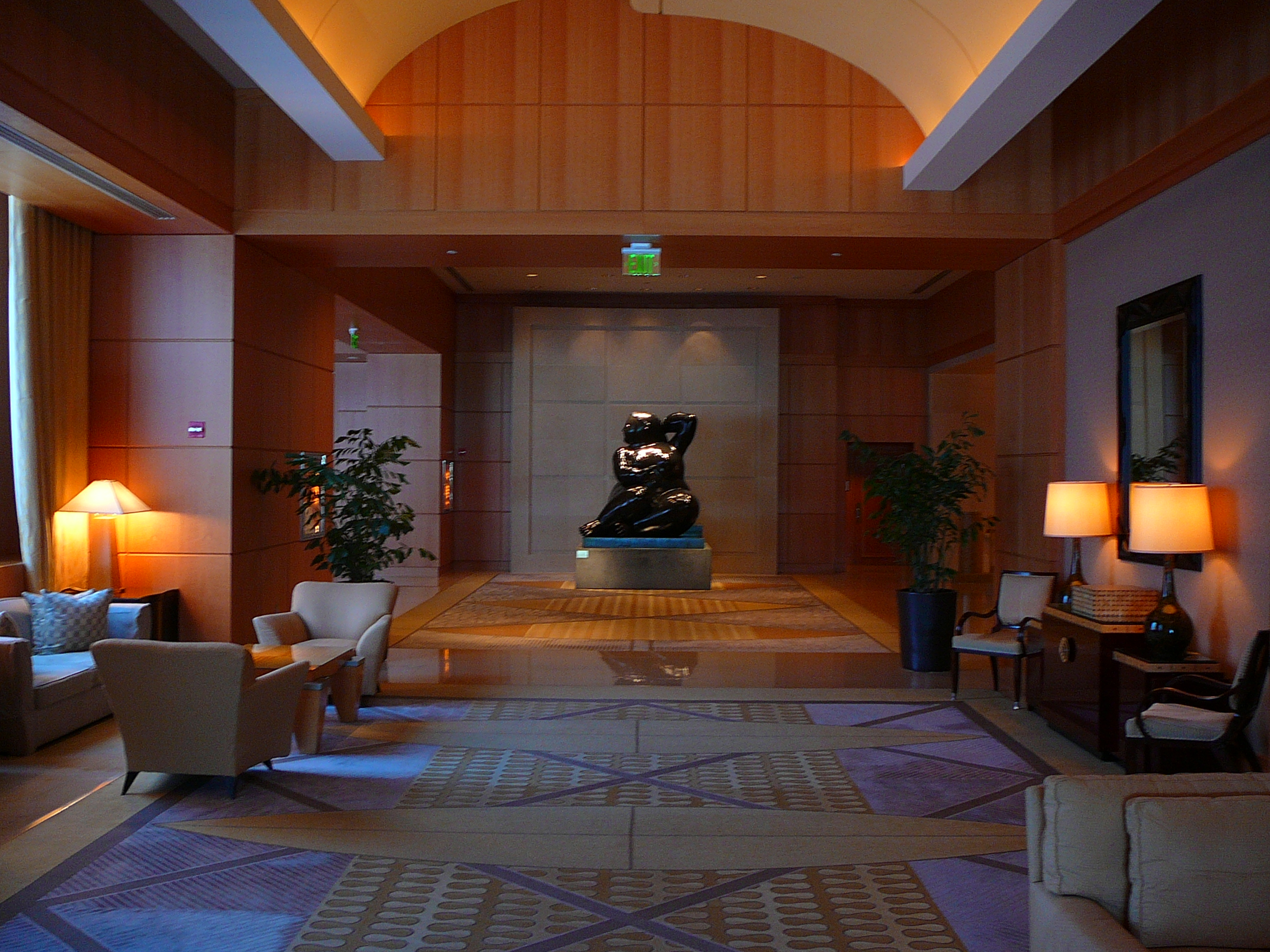
Hotel lobby on 7th floor with Botero statue

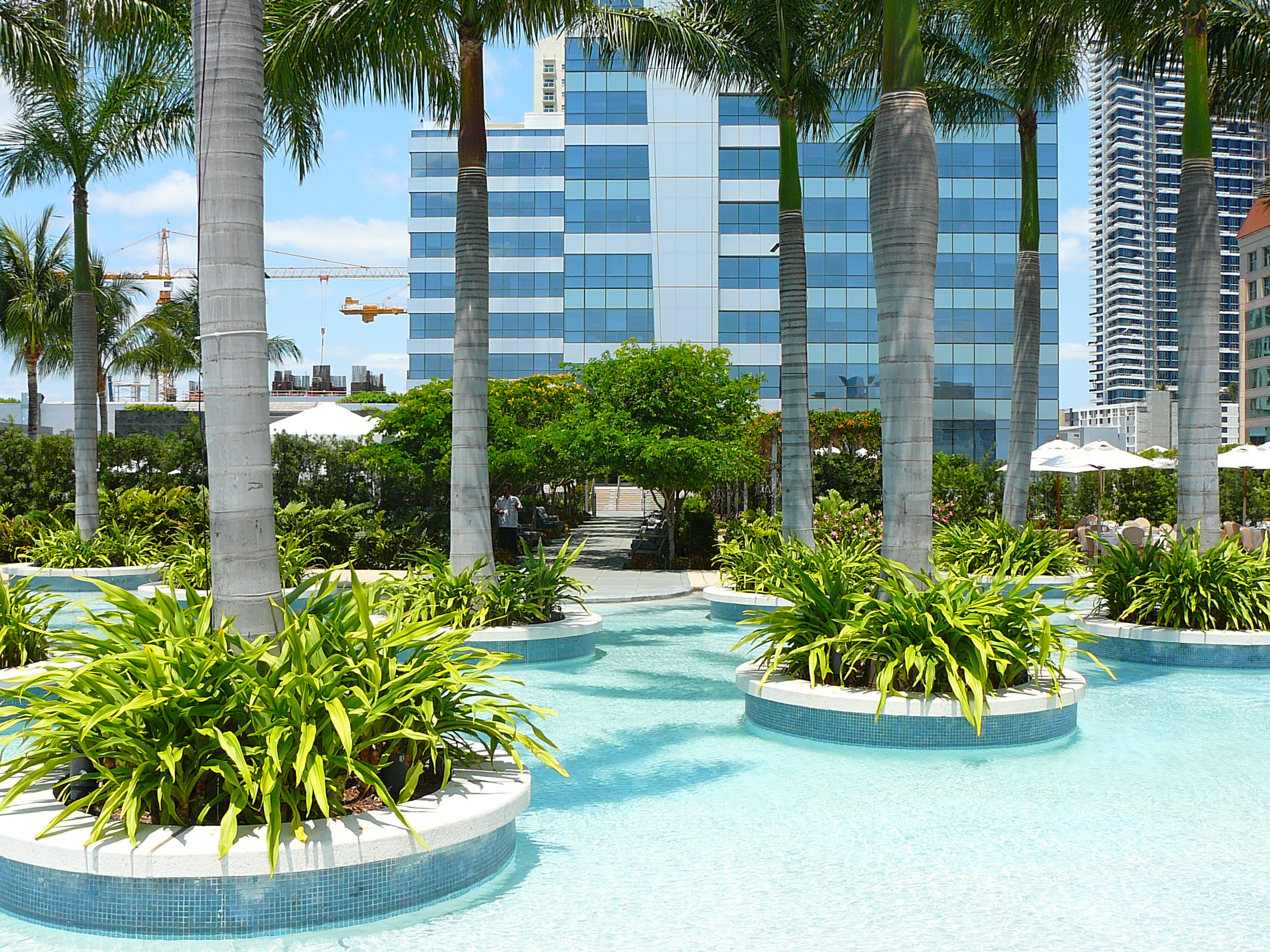
East side of pool deck with miniature palm islands

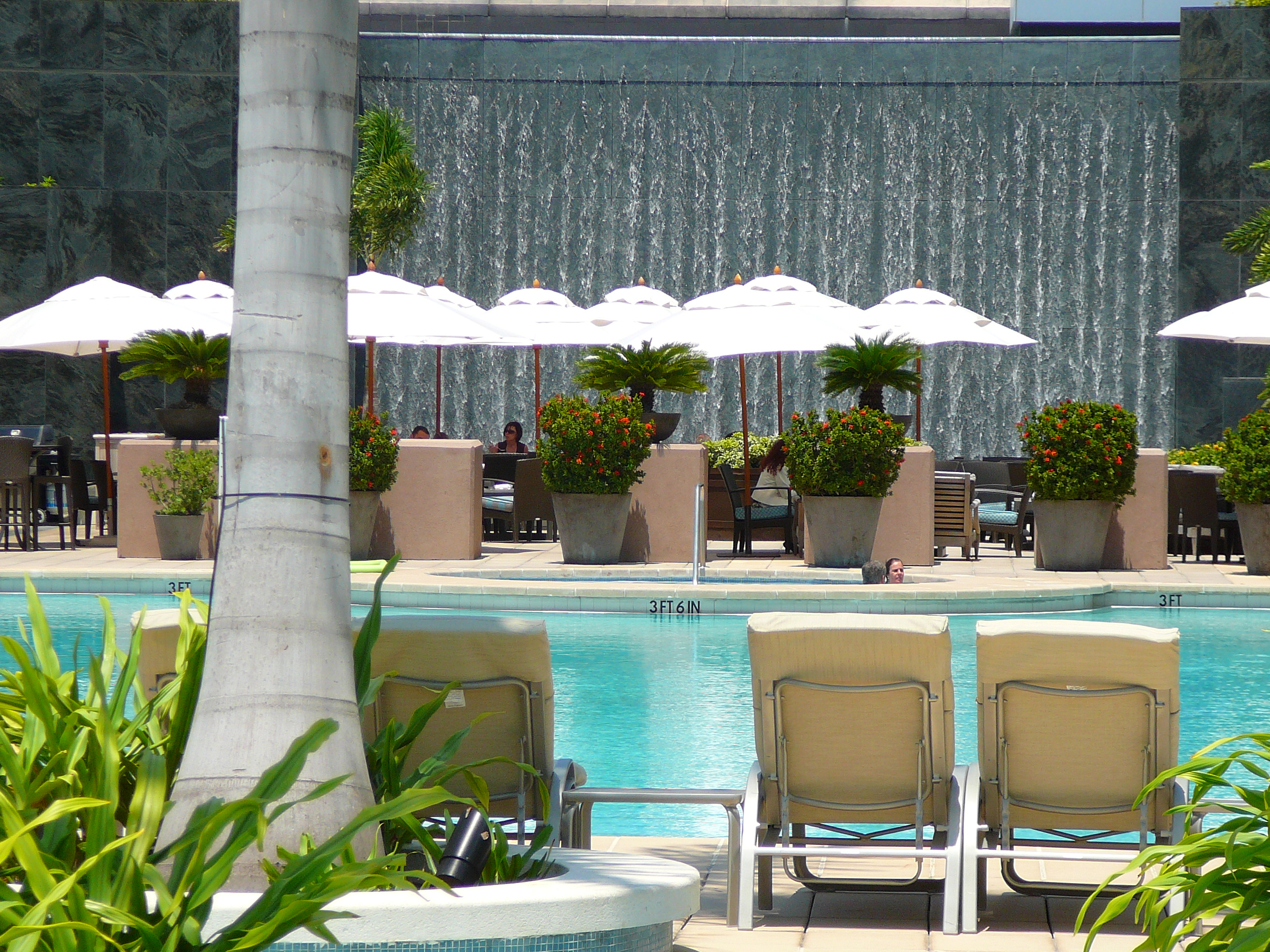
Pool bar with cascade

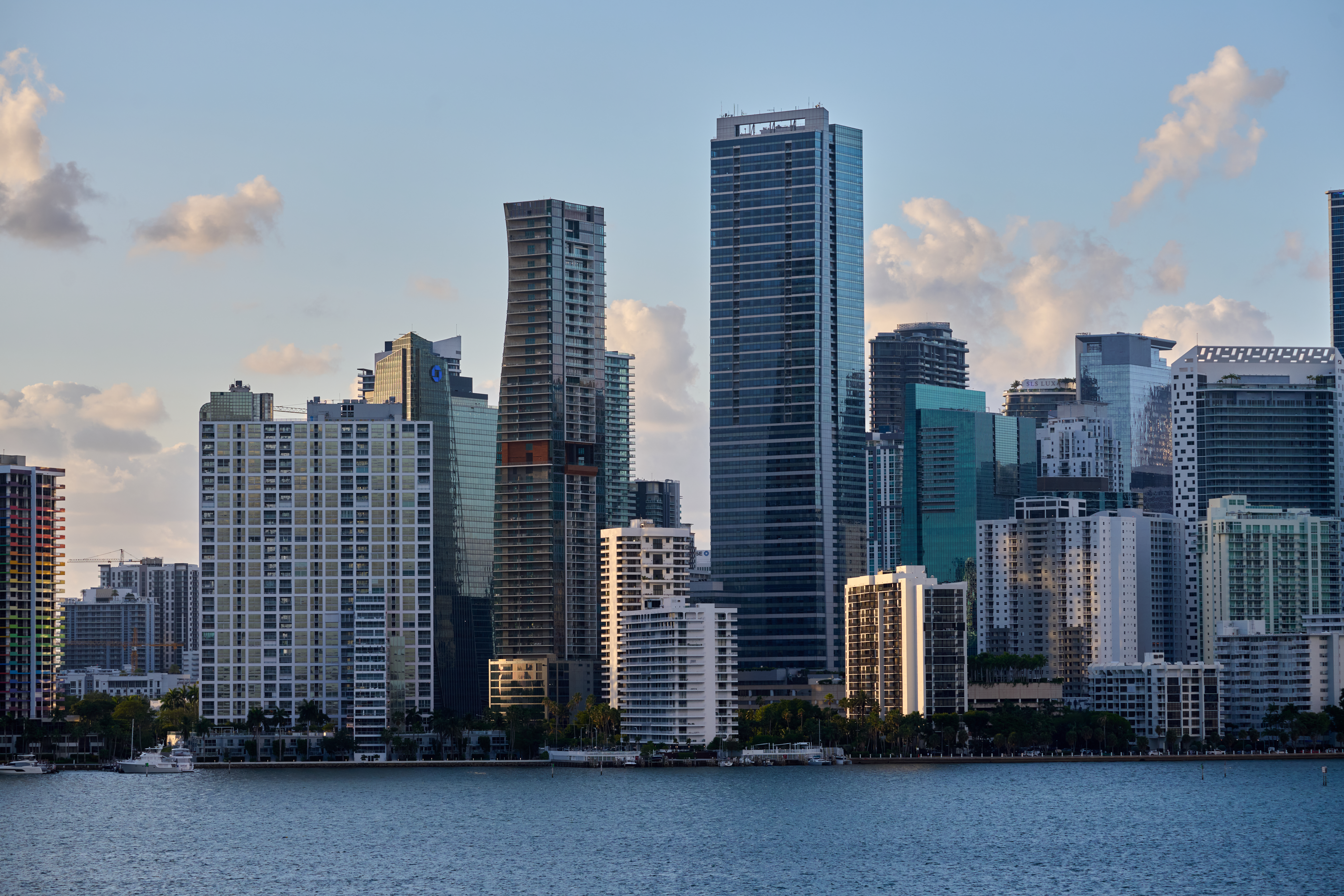
View from Biscayne Bay

== See also ==
- List of tallest buildings in Miami
- List of tallest buildings by U.S. state
- List of tallest buildings in Florida
- Downtown Miami

Records
Preceded by Southeast Financial Center	Tallest building in Miami; 2003–2017; 240 m	Succeeded by Panorama Tower
Preceded by Southeast Financial Center	Tallest building in Florida; 2003–2017; 240 m	Succeeded by Panorama Tower
