= Southeast Financial Center =

Real estate development in Miami, Florida

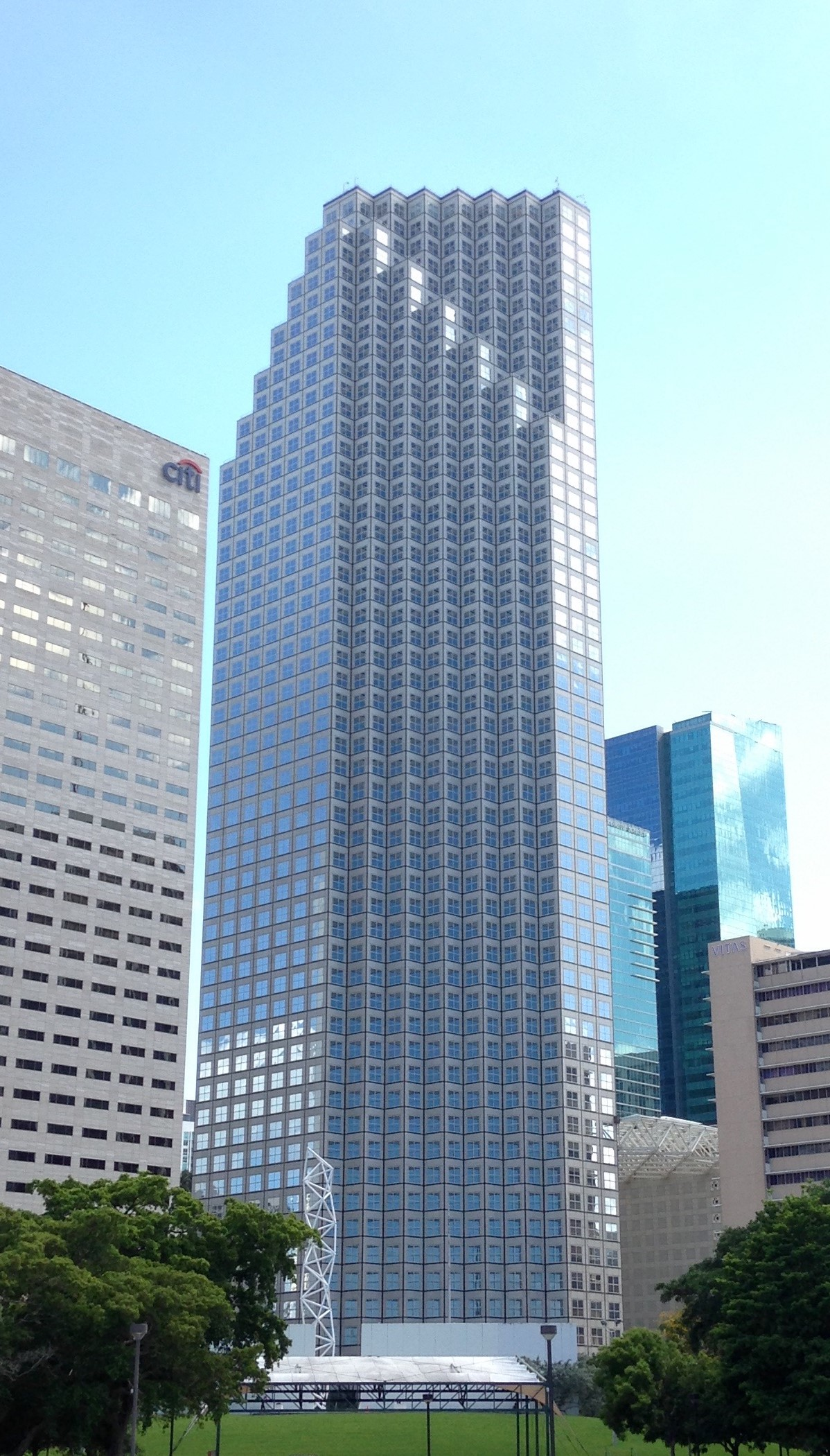
- Former names: Southeast Financial Center (1984-1992, 2011-); First Union Financial Center (1992-2003); Wachovia Financial Center (2003-2011)

General information
- Status: Completed
- Type: Office building
- Location: 200 South Biscayne Boulevard, Miami, Florida
- Coordinates: 25.772255°N 80.187677°W
- Construction started: December 12, 1981
- Completed: October 23, 1984
- Owner: Amancio Ortega
- Operator: JLL

Height
- Roof: 233 m (764 ft)

Technical details
- Floor count: 55
- Floor area: 1,199,990 sq ft (111,483 m^{2})

Design and construction
- Architects: Skidmore, Owings & Merrill; Edward Charles Bassett; Spillis, Candela and Partners, Inc.
- Developer: Gerald D. Hines Interests; Southeast Bank Corporation; Corporate Property Investors
- Structural engineer: Skidmore, Owings & Merrill

Website
- southeastfinancialcenter.com

Southeast Financial Center is a 55-story skyscraper in the Central Business District of Miami, Florida, United States. The building has a roof height of 765 feet (233 m) and is part of a two-acre development that includes a 15-story parking garage. It was previously known as the Southeast Financial Center (1984–1992), the First Union Financial Center (1992–2003) and the Wachovia Financial Center (2003–2011). In 2011, it retook its old name of Southeast Financial Center as Wachovia merged with Wells Fargo and moved to the nearby Wells Fargo Center.

When topped-out in August 1983, it was the tallest building south of Pittsburgh, east of the Mississippi River, taking away the same title from the Westin Peachtree Plaza Hotel, in Atlanta, Georgia. It remained the tallest building in the southeastern U.S. until 1987, when it was surpassed by Atlanta's One Atlantic Center and the tallest in both Miami and the state of Florida until October 1, 2003, when it was surpassed by Miami's Four Seasons Hotel and Tower. A prominent structure in the city's skyline, it remains the tallest office tower in Florida and the fifth-tallest building in Miami.

== Structure ==
Southeast Financial Center was constructed in three years with more than 500 construction workers. Approximately 6,650 tons of structural steel, 80,000 cubic yards of concrete and 7000 cubic tons of reinforcing steel bars went into its construction. The complex sits on a series of reinforced concrete grade beams tied to 150 concrete caissons as much as ten feet in diameter and to a depth of 80 feet. A steel space-frame canopy with glass skylights covers the outdoor plaza between the tower and low-rise building.

The tower has a composite structure. The exterior columns and beams are concrete encased steel wide flanges surrounded by reinforcing bars. The composite exterior frame was formed using hydraulic steel forms, or "flying forms," jacked into place with a "kangaroo" crane, that was located in the core and manually clamped into place. Wide flange beams topped by a metal deck and concrete form the interior floor framing. The core is A braced steel frame, designed to laterally resist wind loads. The construction of one typical floor was completed every five days.

The low-rise banking hall and parking building is a concrete-framed structure. Each floor consists of nearly an acre of continuously poured concrete. When the concrete had sufficiently hardened, compressed air was used to blow the forms fiberglass forms from under the completed floor. It was then rolled out to the exterior where it was raised by crane into position for the next floor.

The building was recognized as Miami's first and only office building to be certified for the LEED Gold award in January 2010.

== History ==
The center was developed by a partnership consisting of Gerald D. Hines Interests, Southeast Bank and Corporate Property Investors for $180 million. It was originally built as the headquarters for Southeast Bank, which originally occupied 50 percent of the complex's space. It remained Southeast Bank's headquarters there until it was liquidated in 1991.

The Southeast Financial Center comprises two buildings: the 55-story office tower and the 15-story parking annex. The tower has 53 stories of office space. The first floor is dedicated for retail, the second floor is the lobby and the 55th floor was home to the luxurious Miami City Club. The parking annex has 12 floors of parking space for 1,150 cars. The first floor is dedicated for retail, the second floor is a banking hall and the 15th floor has the Downtown Athletic Club. A landscaped plaza lies between the office tower and the parking annex. An enclosed walkway connects the second story of the tower with the second story of the annex. The courtyard is partially protected from the elements by a steel and glass space frame canopy spanning the plaza and attached to the tower and annex. The glass space frame canopy was removed between 2020 and 2021. Southeast Bank's executive offices were located on the 38th floor. Ground was broken on the complex on December 12, 1981 and the official dedication and opening for the complex was held on October 23, 1984.

The Southeast Financial Center was designed by Edward Charles Bassett of Skidmore, Owings and Merrill. The Associate Architect was Spillis Candela & Partners. It has 1,145,311 ft^{2} (106,000 m^{2}) of office space. A typical floor has about 22,000 ft^{2} (2,040 m^{2}) of office space. Each floor has 9 ft × 9 ft (2.7 m × 2.7 m) floor to ceiling windows. (All of the building's windows are tinted except for the top floor, resulting in strikingly bright and clear views from there.) The total complex has over 2.2 million ft^{2} (204,000 m^{2}). The distinctive setbacks begin at the 43rd floor. Each typical floor plate has 9 corner offices and the top twelve floors have as many as 16. There are 43 elevators in the office tower. An emergency control station provides computerized monitoring for the entire complex, and four generators for backup power.

The Southeast Financial Center can be seen as far away as Ft. Lauderdale and halfway toward Bimini. Night space shuttle launches from Cape Canaveral 200 miles to the north were plainly visible from the higher floors. The roof of the building was featured in the Wesley Snipes motion picture Drop Zone (1994), where an eccentric base jumper named Swoop parachutes down to the street from a suspended window cleaning trolley. The building also appeared in several episodes of the television series Miami Vice (1984-1990) and at the end of each episode's opening credits.

Zara founder Amancio Ortega purchased the building from J.P. Morgan Asset Management in December 2016. The purchase price was reportedly over $500 million, making it one of the largest real estate transactions in South Florida history.

== Tenants ==
- Berkeley Research Group
- BTG Pactual
- Bryan Cave
- Citadel LLC
- Citadel Securities
- Canadian Consulate
- Cozen O'Connor
- DLA Piper
- Goldman Sachs
- K&L Gates
- Merrill Lynch
- Morgan Stanley
- Rialto Management Group
- Shutts & Bowen
- Squire Patton Boggs
- WeWork
- Winston & Strawn
- White & Case

== Gallery ==
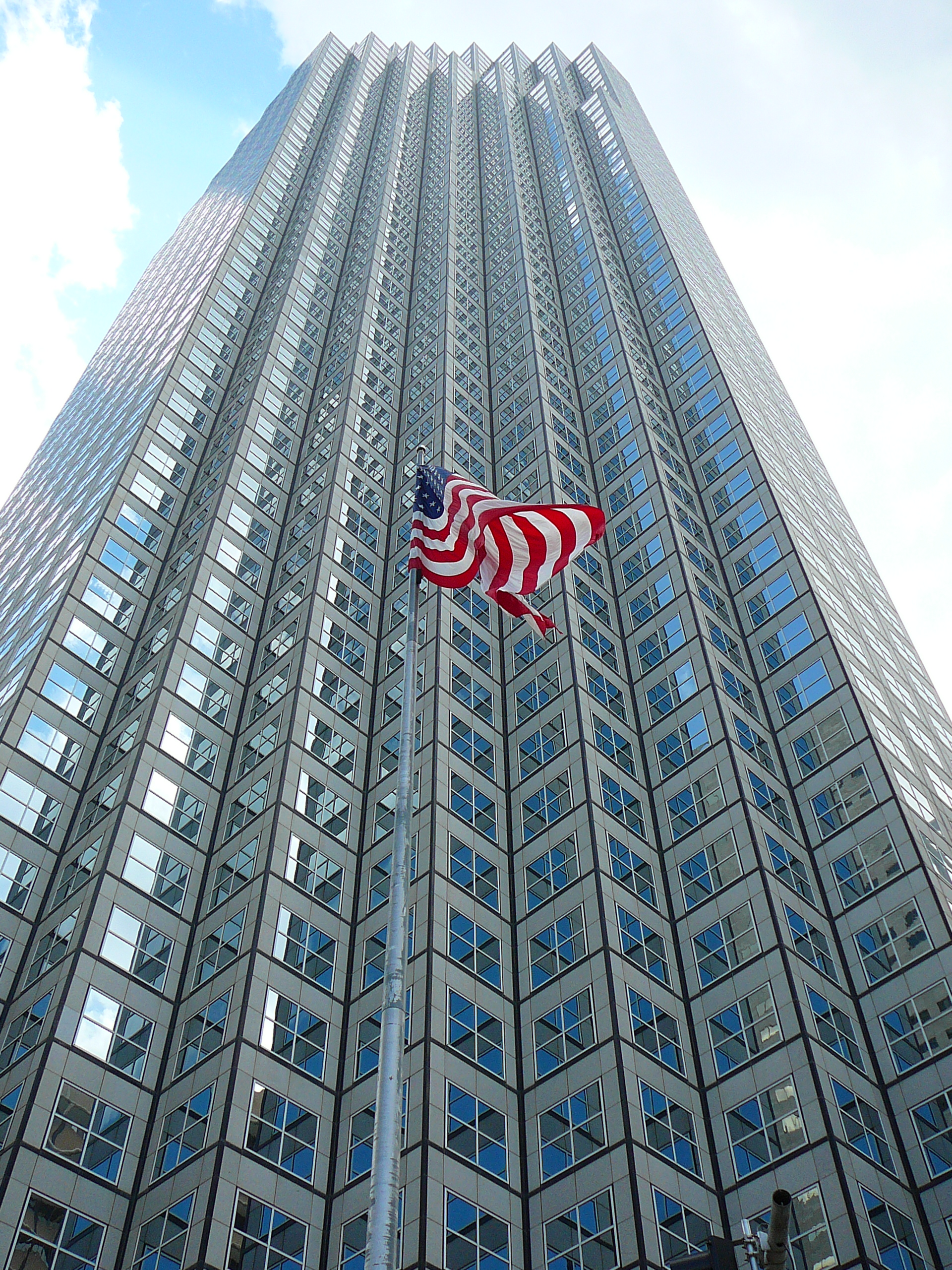
Closeup frontal view

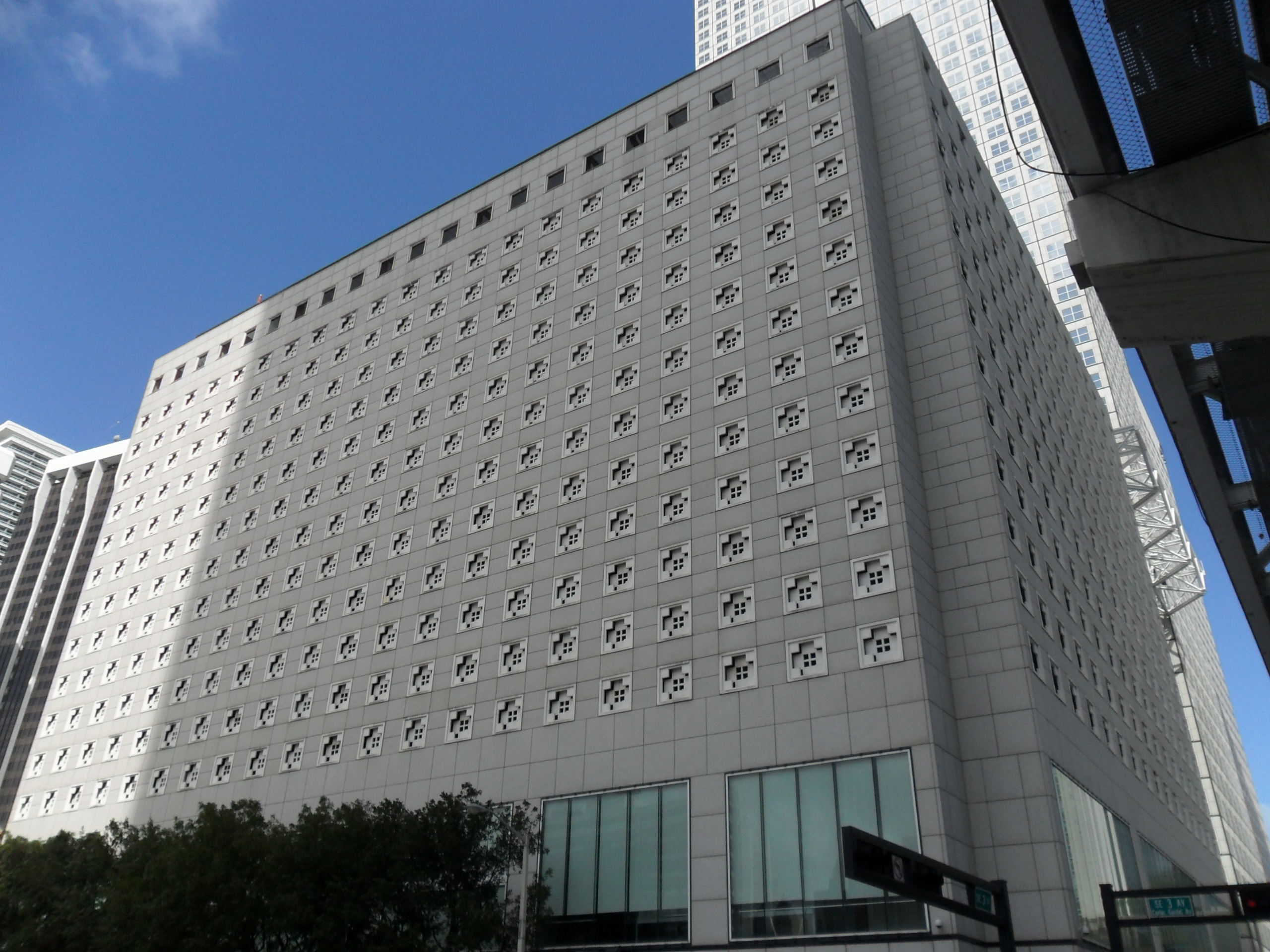
14 story parking annex

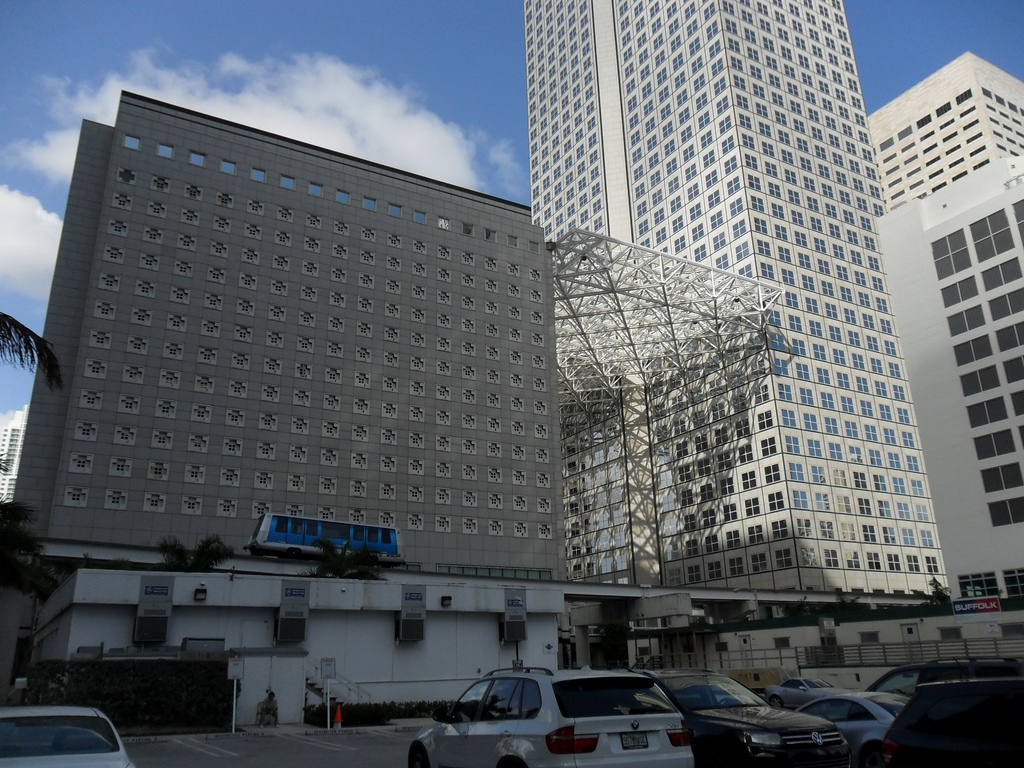
Bottom of the building from the south with a Metromover vehicle passing by

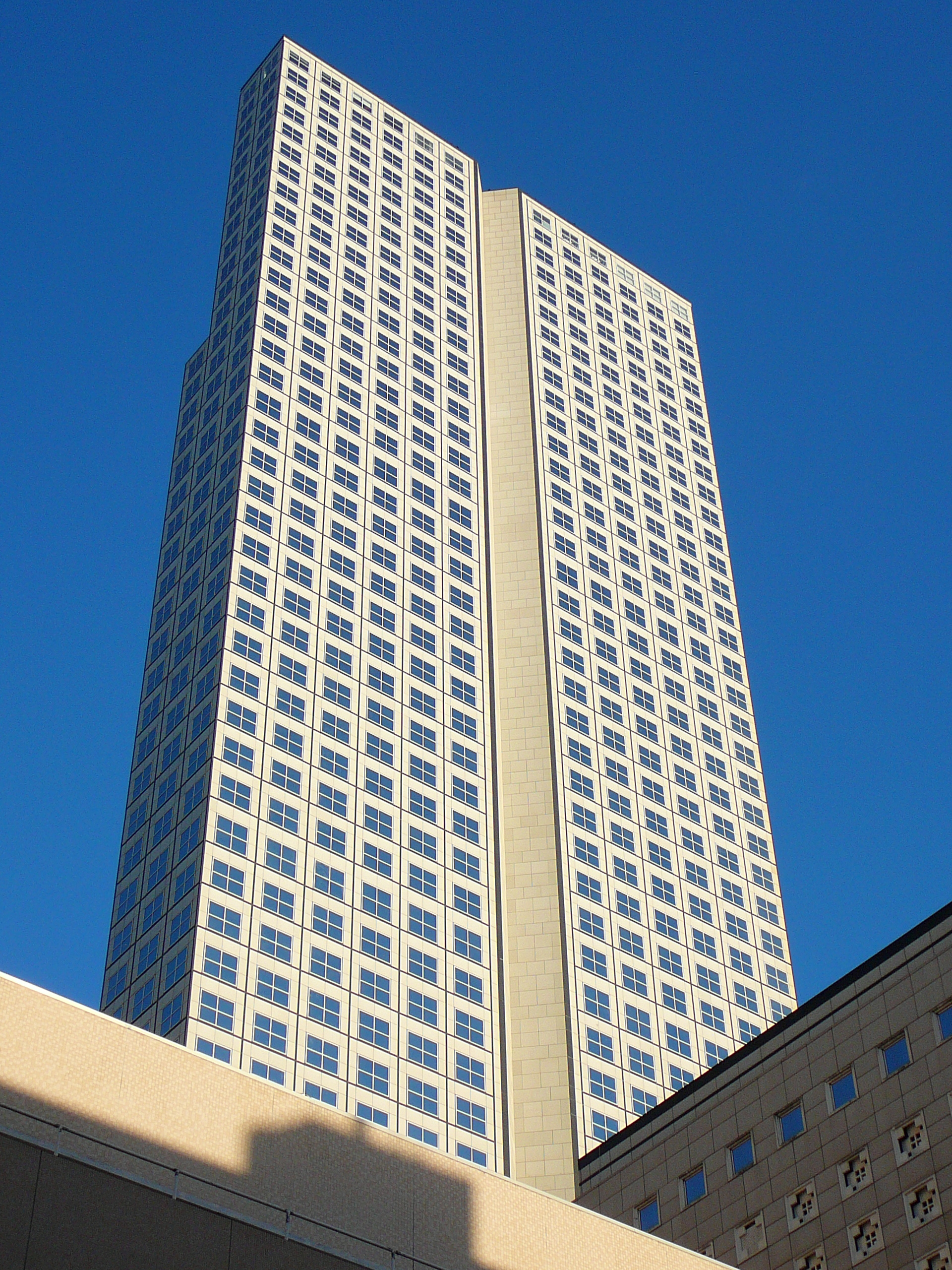
Angle showing bevelled side

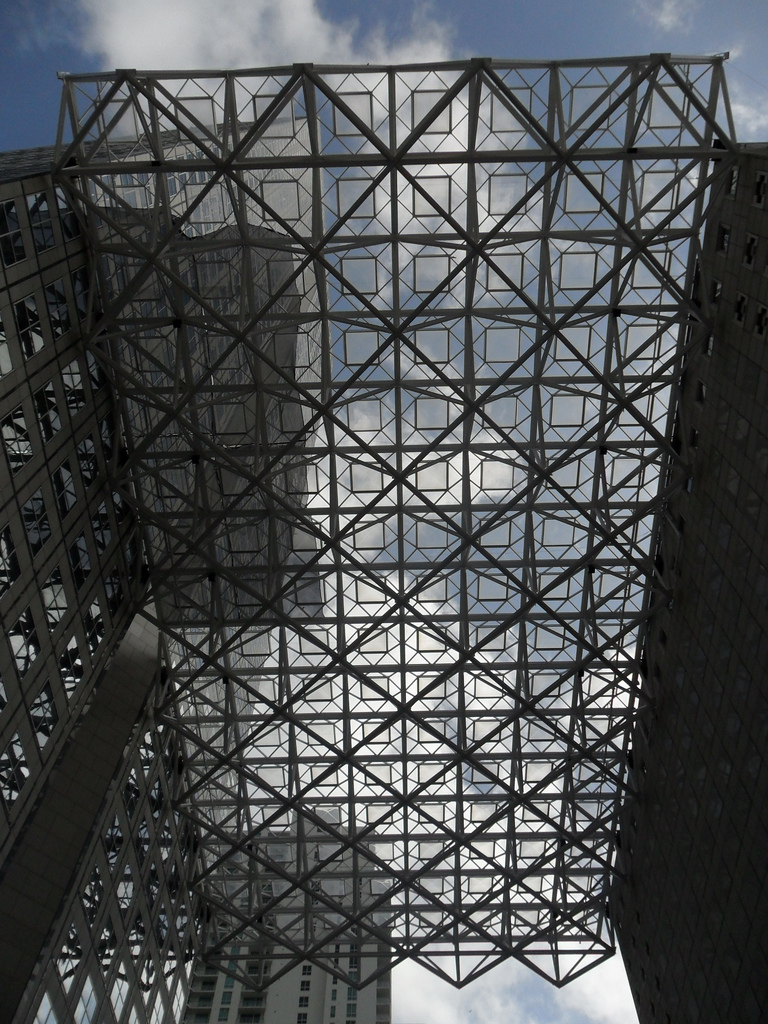
Roof over the plaza between the tower and the parking garage

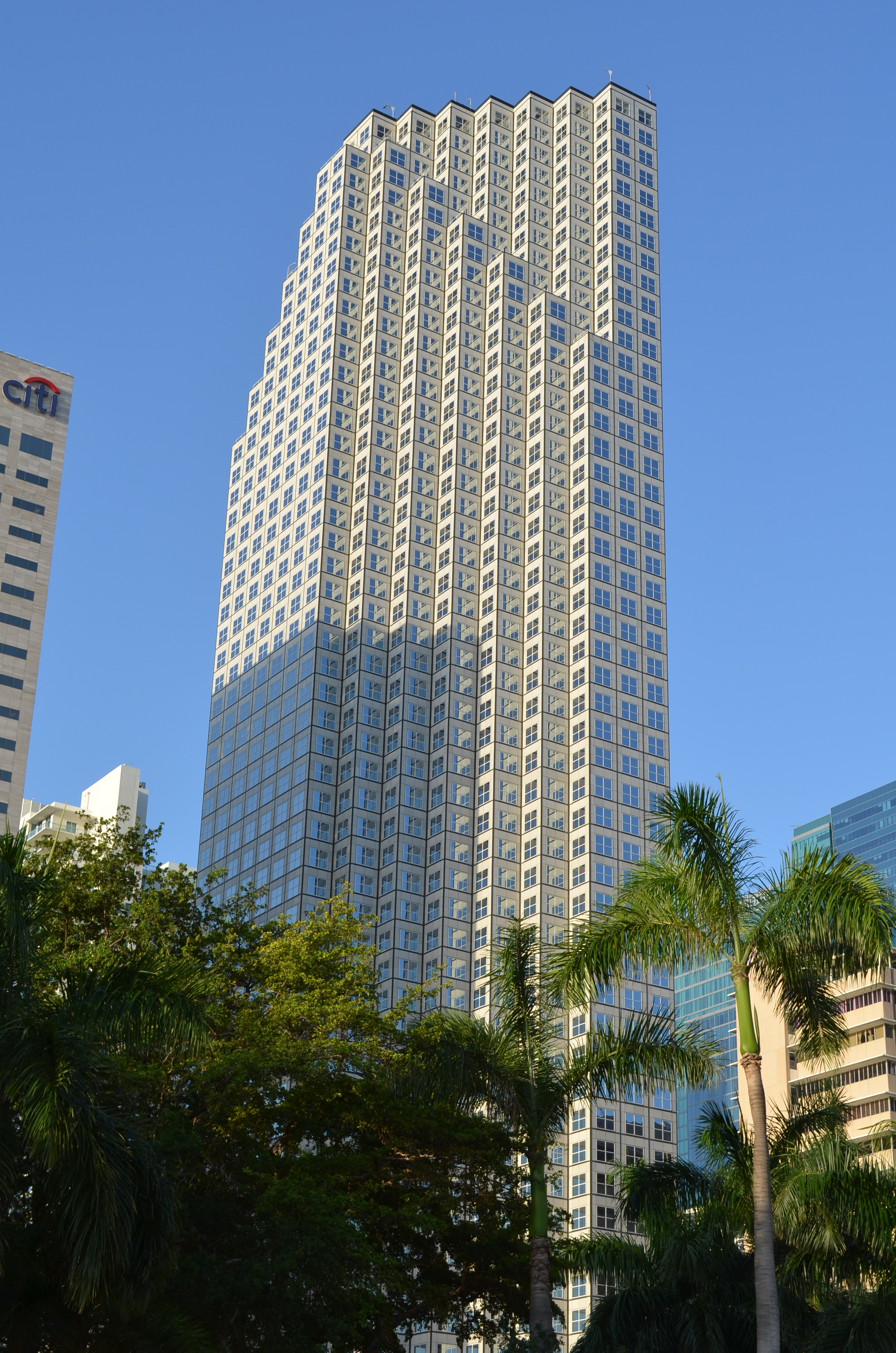
As seen from the park in 2012

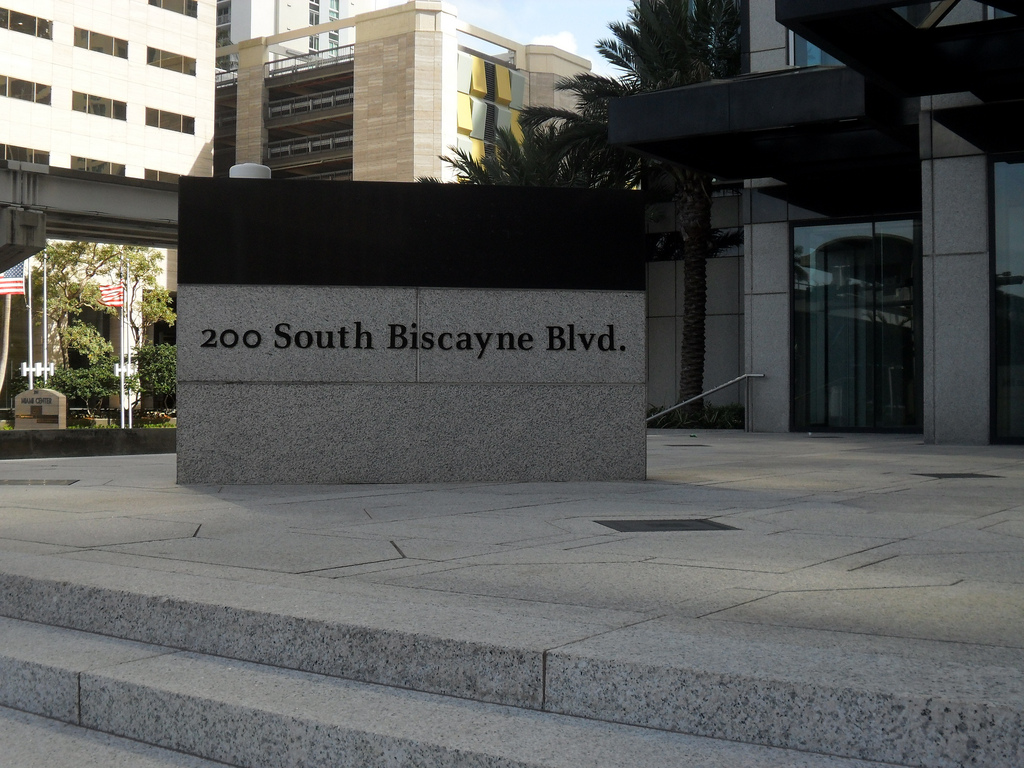
200 Biscayne Boulevard sign located at the main entrance

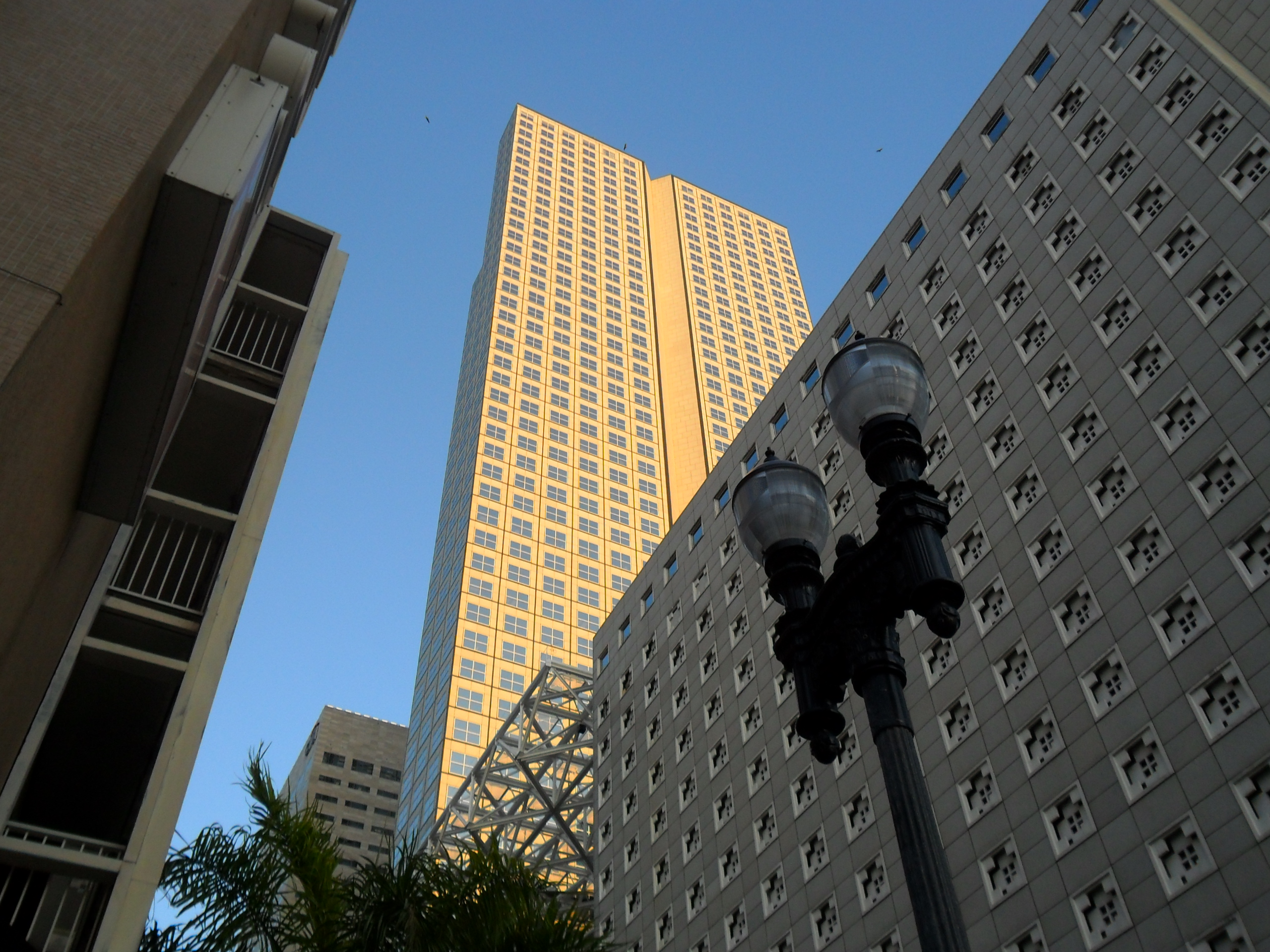
Northwest view

== See also ==
- List of tallest buildings in Miami
- Downtown Miami
- List of tallest buildings in Florida
- List of tallest buildings in the United States

Records
Preceded by One Biscayne Tower	Tallest Building in Miami; 1984–2003; 233m	Succeeded by Four Seasons Hotel Miami
Preceded by One Tampa City Center	Tallest Building in Florida; 1984–2003; 233m	Succeeded by Four Seasons Hotel Miami
