= Waldorf Astoria Miami =

Under-construction skyscraper in Miami, Florida

Waldorf Astoria Hotel and Residences Miami

- Waldorf Astoria Miami in October 2026

General information
- Status: Under construction
- Type: Residential, hotel, retail
- Location: 330 Biscayne Boulevard, Miami, Florida, United States
- Coordinates: 25°46′39″N 80°11′20″W
- Construction started: 2022
- Estimated completion: 2027

Height
- Roof: 1,041 ft (317 m)

Technical details
- Floor count: 100

Design and construction
- Architect: Sieger Suarez Architects
- Developer: Property Markets Group; Greybrook Realty Partners; S2 Development
- Main contractor: John Moriarty and Associates

Website
- waldorfresidencesmiami.com

The Waldorf Astoria Hotel and Residences is a supertall skyscraper currently under construction in the Central Business District of Miami, Florida. It is being constructed on the former site of the once-proposed Empire World Towers, which were proposed and ultimately cancelled in the 2000s. With a final height of 1,041 ft (317 m), it will be the tallest building in the Southern United States, and the tallest residential building south of New York City, surpassing the 1,020-foot (311 m) Bank of America Plaza in Atlanta, and the 1,030-foot (314 m) Waterline tower nearing completion in Austin, Texas.

The building is planned to rise to the maximum allowable height in downtown Miami of 1,049 ft (320 meters) above sea level, or about 1,040 ft (317 meters) above ground, making it the tallest building in Miami and Florida, surpassing the Panorama Tower built in 2017, and the 940-foot (286-meter) Cipriani Residences Miami, which topped out in early 2026. Construction began in late 2022 and is expected to top out in 2026 and be completed by January 2028. It is located on Biscayne Boulevard between NE 3rd and 4th Streets in the Central Business District of Greater Downtown Miami, across from Bayfront Park. The design incorporates deconstructivist elements, resembling the City of Capitals skyscrapers in MIBC with its composition of stacked and cantilevered boxes; it will have nine such cubes with 10 to 11 floors each, comprising nearly 100 stories of condominium and hotel space, including a five floor penthouse at the top with over 30,000 square feet (2,800 m^{2}) It is named after the Waldorf Astoria New York in New York City; worldwide Waldorf Astoria hotels are managed under the Hilton Hotels group.

All one-bedroom apartments in the skyscraper have been sold before construction was even completed. Prices now start at $3.3 million for a two-bedroom apartment. The five-story, 33,000+ square foot penthouse atop the structure was also sold for an undisclosed amount. It is the largest residential unit south of New York City.

== Gallery ==
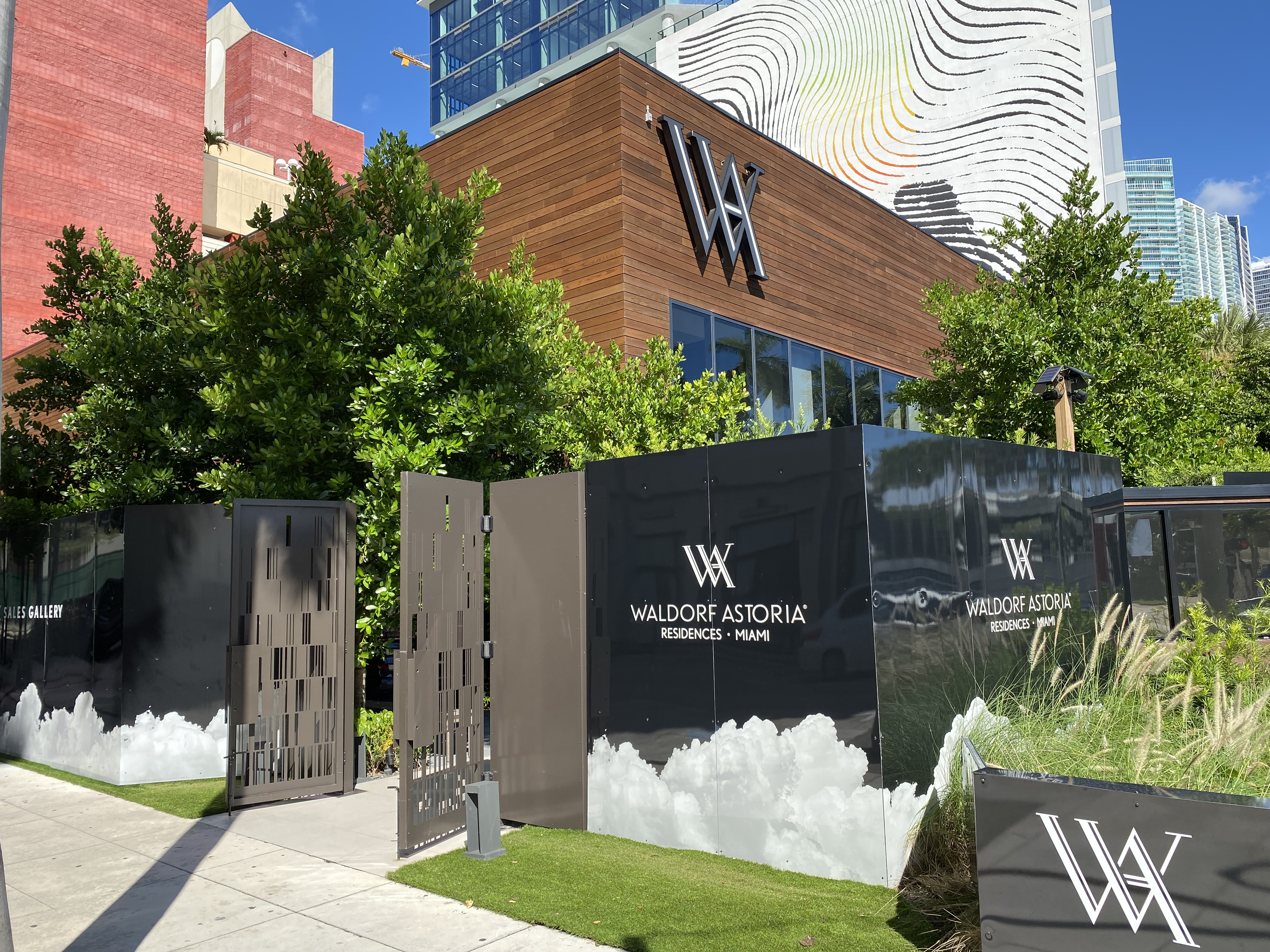
Sales center in 2022

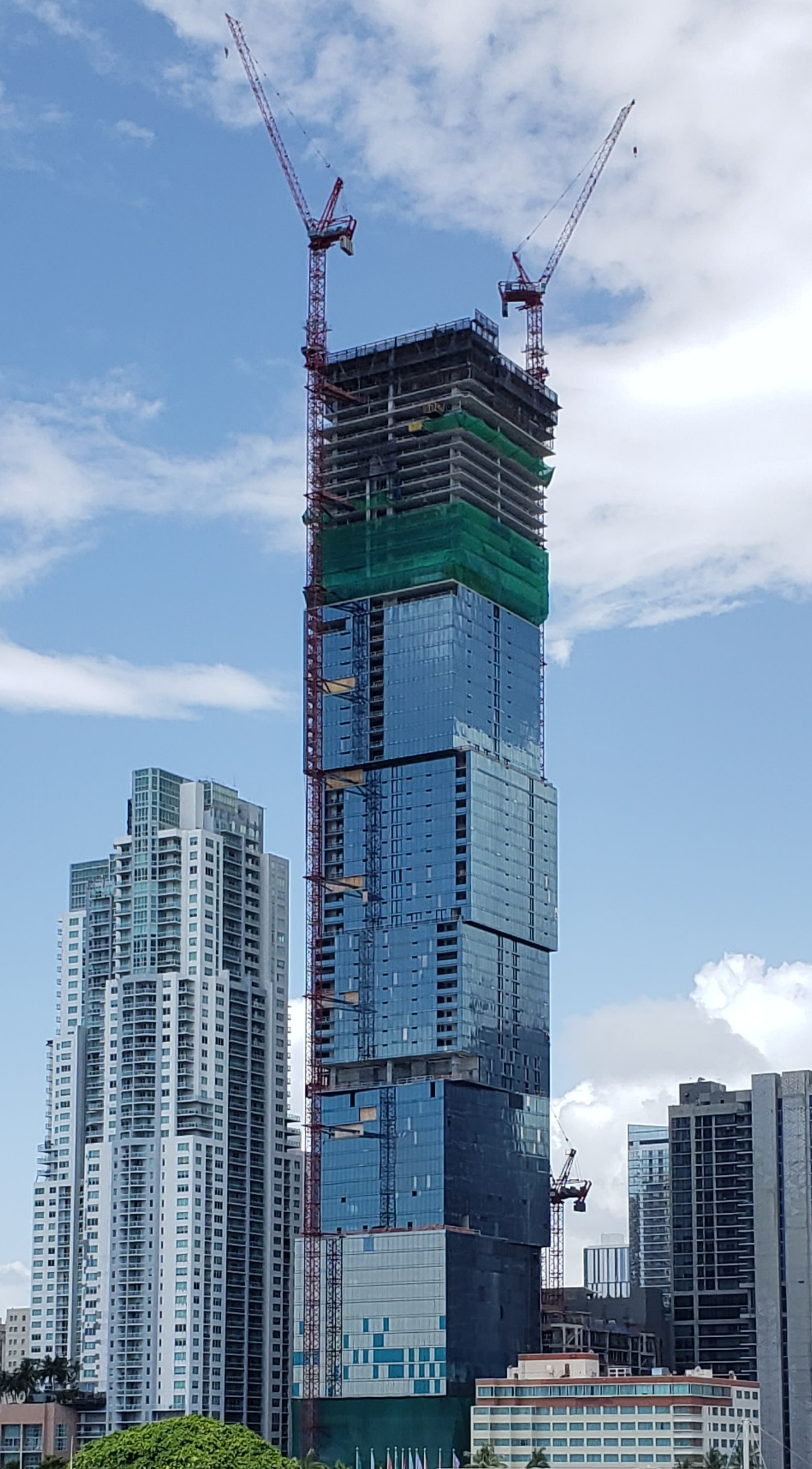
Construction in July 2026

== See also ==
- List of tallest buildings in Miami
- List of tallest buildings in Florida
