= Tibor Hollo =

American real estate developer (1927–2024)

- Born: July 13, 1927; Budapest, Hungary
- Died: May 1, 2024 (aged 96); Miami, Florida, U.S.
- Occupation: Real estate developer
- Known for: Founder of Florida East Coast Realty
- Spouses: Doris Green (m. 1950; d. 1958); Aida Mishkin Politano (m. 1958; d. 1966); Sara Sheila Gordon (m. 1967)
- Children: Deborah Hollo Proven; Harvey Hollo; Laurence Hollo; Jonathan Politano; Wayne Hollo; Jerome Hollo; Arlene Hollo Chaplin

Tibor Hollo (July 13, 1927 – May 1, 2024) was a Hungarian-American real estate developer, Holocaust survivor, and founder of Florida East Coast Realty.

== Early life and career ==
Hollo was born to a Jewish family in Budapest, Hungary, and moved to Paris, France in 1933 where he was raised. In 1941, he and his parents were arrested after the German occupation of France and sent to the Drancy internment camp outside of Paris. The family was then shipped to the Auschwitz concentration camp where his mother was separated from him and his father; they never saw her again. He and his father were then forced to march to the Mauthausen-Gusen concentration camp in Austria where they remained until their liberation by the U.S. 11th Armored Division on May 5, 1945. Hollo returned to Paris and obtained a degree in architecture from Ecole Polytechnique Institute before immigrating to the United States with $18 to his name. He worked at a curtain factory before landing a job as an estimator for a general contractor. Noticing that most contractors turned down work on the New York waterfront because it was difficult and dirty work, he started his own firm and was able to underbid competitors. After winning and successfully completing many jobs, his reputation allowed him to win larger projects around the city and then nationally. By 1956, his contracting company was ranked the tenth largest in the United States.

In 1960, he moved to Miami. Recognizing that Miami had limited space as it was defined by the ocean on the east and the Everglades on the west, he believed that the future of the city was in vertical, downtown residential living. He founded Florida East Coast Realty in 1972 and completed his first major building, 888 Brickell Avenue, a seven-story office building. In 1968, he bought six blocks of blighted waterfront property next to the Venetian Causeway; wanting to convert it into a mall, he faced opposition from the local government who did not want to close any streets as required to complete the project.

In 1973, Maurice Ferre, the newly elected mayor of Miami and the son of a Puerto Rican real estate developer, gave his support to Hollo allowing him to build the Omni International Mall in 1975 as well as the 810-unit Venetia Tower and marina. Using his political capital with the mayor, he was also able to secure Miami's second ever tax-increment financing zone for the Arts & Entertainment District (then Omni); the zone would use property taxes to improve the streets, utilities, and infrastructure in the neighborhood. The Venetia Tower was unsuccessful due to the collapse of the South American economy in the late 1980s; and in 1988, after having only sold 57 of 810 units, Hollo was forced to cede ownership of the project.

Learning from his experience, he only worked on one project at a time and never borrowed more than 40% of the project's cost. Hollo went on to build many projects including the U.S. Justice Department Building, the Vizcaya Towers, The Grand Doubletree, the Biscayne Bay Marriott, the Opera Tower, the Bay Parc Plaza and the 868 ft. Panorama Tower. He worked on the 1,049 foot One Bayfront Plaza.

=== Personal life and death ===
Hollo married his first wife, Doris Green, in 1950. They were divorced in 1958. Doris Green Hollo died in 1979. Hollo married his second wife, Aida Mishkin, in 1958. They were divorced in 1966. He married Sara Sheila Gordon in 1967. Hollo had seven children. His two eldest sons, Harvey and Laurence, predeceased him.

Hollo died in Miami on May 1, 2024, at the age of 96.

== Philanthropy ==
In 2012, he donated $2.5 million to fund the Tibor & Sheila Hollo School of Real Estate at Florida International University's Downtown Brickell campus.
