= Panorama Tower =

Skyscraper in Miami, Florida, USA

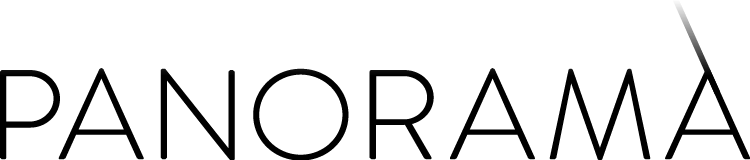

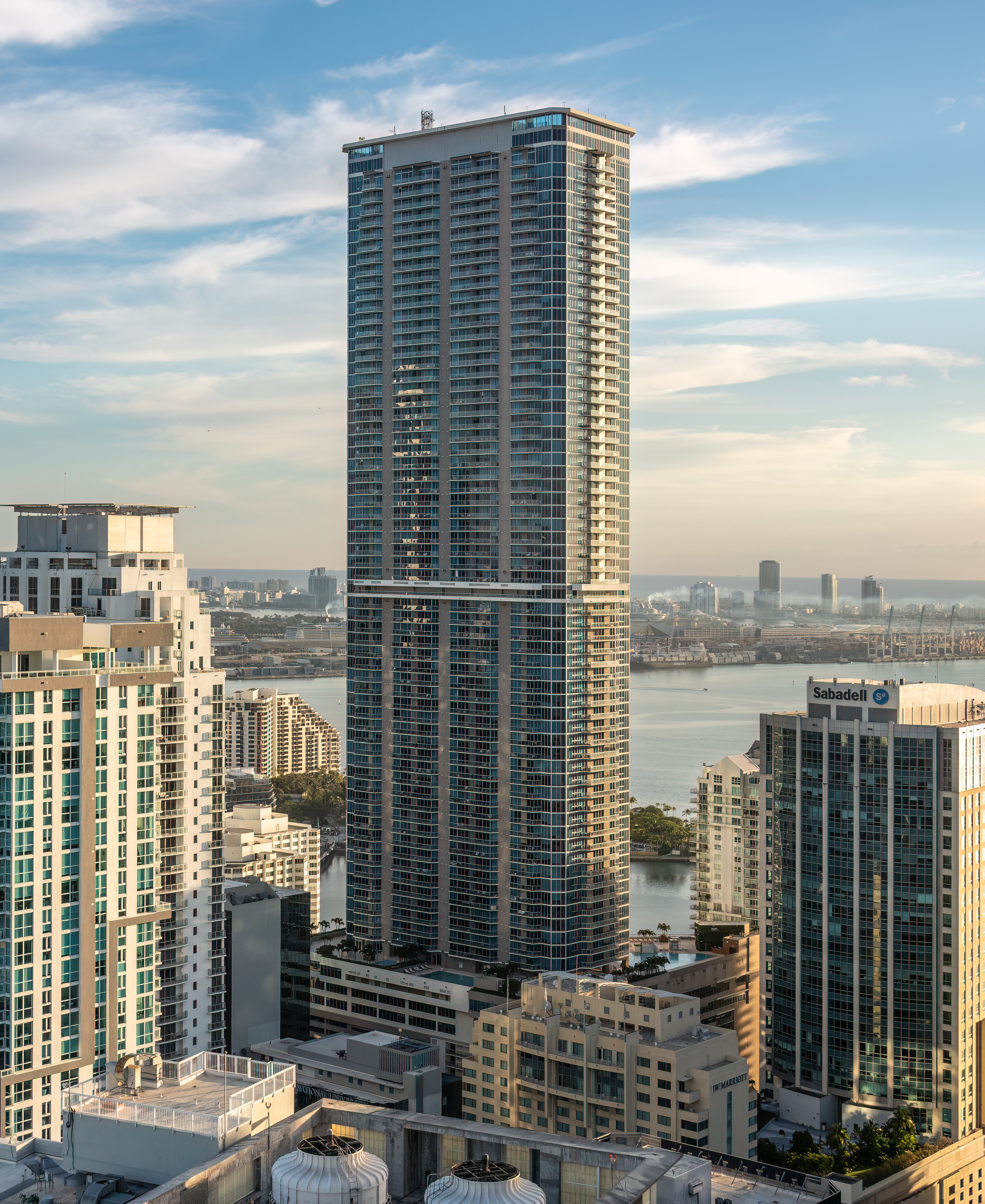
- Panorama Tower in December 2024
- Interactive map of the Panorama Tower area

General information
- Status: Completed
- Type: Mixed-use
- Architectural style: Modernism
- Location: 1100 Brickell Bay Drive Miami, Florida, 33131 United States
- Coordinates: 25.763062°N 80.19037°W
- Construction started: January 2014
- Completed: July 9, 2018
- Cost: US$800 million (preliminary estimate)
- Owner: Tibor Hollo

Height
- Antenna spire: 868 ft (265 m)
- Roof: 828 ft (252 m)

Technical details
- Floor count: 81 marketed as 85
- Floor area: 2,600,000 square feet (241,548 m^{2})

Design and construction
- Architects: Moshe Cosicher AIA; FONS Inc.
- Developer: Florida East Coast Realty
- Structural engineer: DeSimone Consulting Engineers
- Main contractor: Owner Terminated Tutor Perini, finished by Rotunda Structures, LC

Website
- panoramatower.com

Panorama Tower is a mixed-use 85-story skyscraper in Miami, Florida, United States. Located in the Brickell district of Downtown Miami, it is the tallest building in Miami, and the tallest building in Florida.

Construction on Panorama Tower was put on hold during the 2007-2009 Great Recession. The project was revived in 2012 when owner Tibor Hollo hired Moshe Cosicher, AIA Architect, to redesign the project. In 2013, the project was revised; the 868-foot (265 m) tower includes residential, hotel, retail, and office space. Panorama Tower overtook the Four Seasons Hotel Miami as tallest when it topped out in late 2017. The project is the first development in the City of Miami to be funded in part by EB-5 visas. While the entire site was technically addressed 1101 Brickell Avenue, the building is actually located on the back of the lot, behind two existing office buildings, at 1100 Brickell Bay Drive. It is about two blocks from the Tenth Street Metromover station.

== History ==
Kobi Karp provided design plans for a tower at 1101 Brickell Avenue by developer Leviev Boymelgreen. It was approved by the City of Miami in 2006 and cleared by the Federal Aviation Administration (FAA) for a maximum height of 851 feet (259 m) above mean sea level (AMSL) in 2005. The 849-foot (259-meter) (AMSL) building was to contain 270,000 square feet (25,000 m^{2}) of office space, 30,000 square feet (2,800 m^{2}) of retail as well as 650 residences. However, the project was put on hold due to the crash of the United States housing bubble. The site of the project was purchased by veteran Miami developer Tibor Hollo of Florida East Coast Realty in 2009; the U.S. $33-million purchase price included the three-acre site and existing office buildings, built in 1964 and 1985. The office buildings had very low occupancy at this time, around 30% in 2010. The building was renovated and by the end of 2012 occupancy was up to 85%. In 2011, Florida International University opened a downtown campus in the building known as FIU Downtown on Brickell; they also got the signage rights to the building. In addition to the renovation, a small glass and steel addition adjacent to Brickell Avenue was completed in 2014. Known as "The Cube", the 2,500-square-foot (232 m^{2}) space uses variable-tint glass and houses a TD Bank.

== Design ==
In 2012, Hollo began developing plans for the project, and the name "Panorama Tower" was introduced. The height remained the same at 849 feet (259 m), but the number of units was quoted at 724. Hollo revised the plans in 2013. The FAA required the height of the structure to be lowered to 822 feet (251 m).^{[A]} In 2013 and 2014, respectively, the developers were working to ensure the building height would not be greatly reduced under the FAA's "emergency airspace" or "one-engine inoperative" policies which were proposed at that time. At this point, the building was designed to include 821 residential units and 250 hotel units,^{[B]} as well as approximately 83,000 sq ft (7,700 m^{2}) of retail and approximately 39,000 sq ft (3,600 m^{2}) of office space in the 13 story pedestal which would also include about 1500 parking spaces. Moshe Cosicher is the architect of record for the project and Fons Inc. was retained to work alongside for the production and construction administration of the project. In 2014, the parking pedestal, now shown as 19 stories and quoted to have 2,000 parking spaces, was reported to include 100,000 square feet (9,300 m^{2}) of medical office space and about 50,000 square feet (4,600 m^{2}) of retail space. The number of hotel rooms decreased to 208,^{[B]} and the flag was revealed to be Hyatt full service brand Hyatt Centric. The hotel would be located within 17 floors lining the east face of the pedestal. The building would be the largest building in Miami, with gross floor area quoted between 2.6 million square feet (240,000 m^{2}) and 3 million square feet (278,709 m^{2}), the latter number including the existing office building. In 2016, a slight height increase to the current 868 feet (265 m) was sought by the developers and approved by the FAA.

Interior design concept was provided by Zyscovich Architecture.

== Construction ==
Site preparation began in late 2013 with the clearing of the site and demolition of an existing parking garage, with foundation work by HJ Foundation, part of the Keller Group beginning in June 2014, when California-based Tutor Perini was awarded the US$255 million contract as the main contractor. As of January 2015 the construction was said to be ahead of schedule. The continuous concrete pour for the approximately 14,000 cubic yard (11,000-cubic-meter (388,461 ft^{3})) raft slab required hundreds of cement trucks operating for over 24 hours from numerous factories. The approximately 11,000-cubic-meter (388,461 ft^{3}) pour took place over a weekend in late March 2015 and was one of the largest continuous pours in Florida history. The project received a US$340 million construction loan from Wells Fargo in 2015, with construction well underway. By October 2015, construction was up to the top of the 19-story pedestal. In January 2016, the building received a temporary certificate of occupancy (TCO) for the lower 11 floors of the parking garage. Users of the existing buildings had been using off-site parking in the interim. Over 1 million square feet (93,000 m^{2}) of the project was structurally completed, and the building was still on schedule for completion in late 2017. During the first half of 2016 a height increase to 868 feet (265 m) was approved; this may affect the floor count, which was at least 81 actual floors at the 822-foot (251 m) level. Other than the Renaissance Center in Detroit and Westin Peachtree Plaza Hotel in Atlanta, both hotels, it would be the only building over 700 feet (210 m) to stick to a total floor-to-floor height of no more than 10 feet (3.0 m). Hotels, parking garages, and condos generally have much less floor-to-floor height than high-rise office towers. However, very few towers of any kind over 50 floors keep to an overall height under 10 feet (3.0 m) per floor, due to increased ceiling heights or the need for mechanical floor levels, rooftop HVAC, housing for the tops of elevator shafts, spire details, or other infrastructure. It is unclear whether the floor count will remain at 82, or increase to 85 due to the height increase. DeSimone Consulting Engineers is serving as structural engineer on the project. The firm has designed numerous supertall towers and skyscrapers worldwide, and frequently works with top architects and developers on marquee projects globally.

On March 24, 2017, the same week the building officially surpassed the height of the Four Seasons Hotel Miami, a small fire broke out on the 68th floor just before 7 pm. It was extinguished within hours, with no injuries or delay to the project's timeline. The cause was not immediately known. No work was underway when the fire broke out.

With a topping out in April, the 208-room Hyatt Centric hotel in the pedestal is expected to open in the third quarter of 2017, with the building to open by the end of the year.

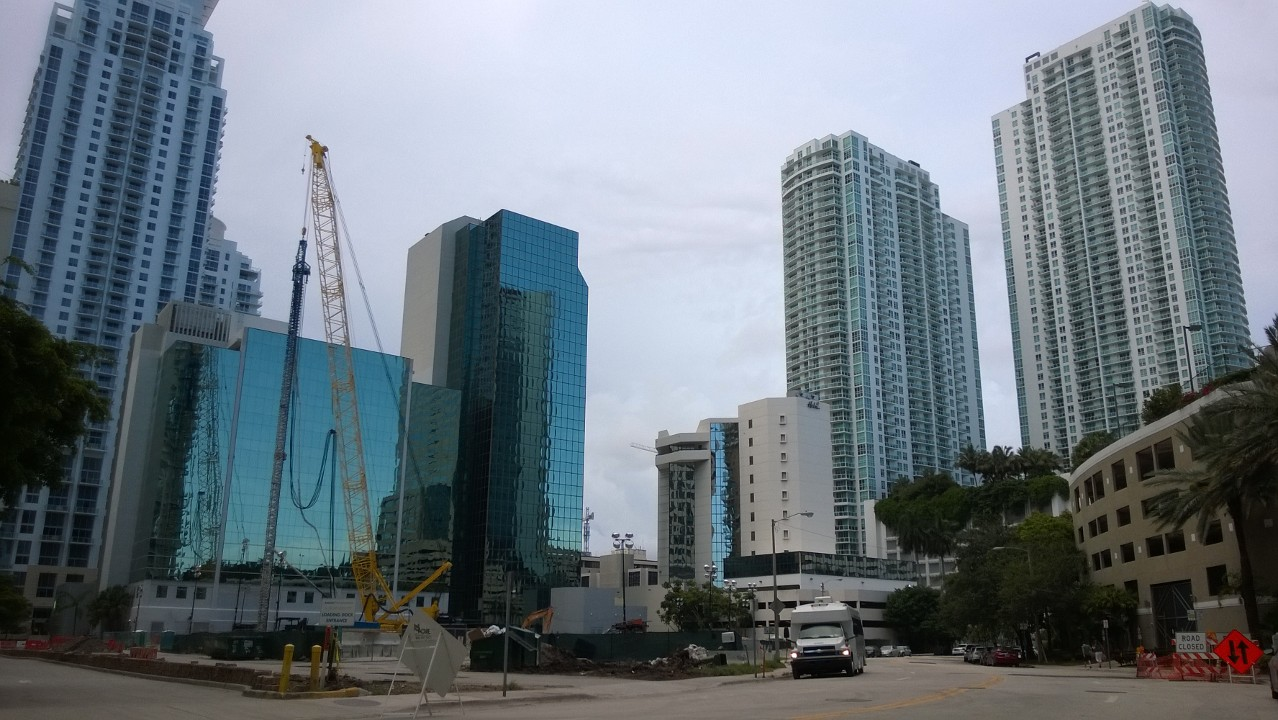
Site prep in 2014, behind existing 1980s office buildings at 1101 Brickell Avenue

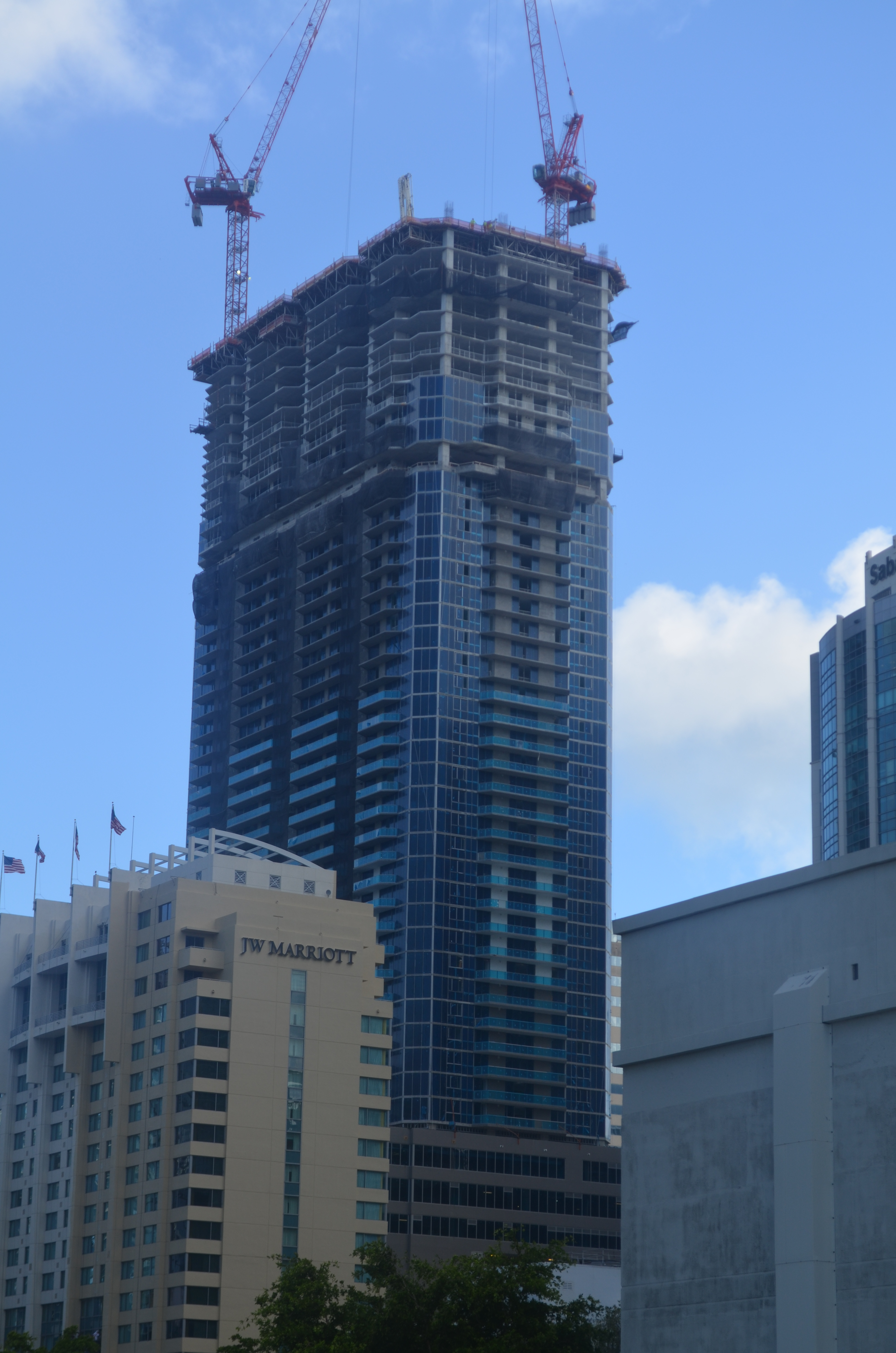
Panorama Tower under construction in October 2016 at about 60 floors. The building will be significantly larger than other skyscrapers in Florida. The design variation at about 50 floors is the 48th floor amenity deck.

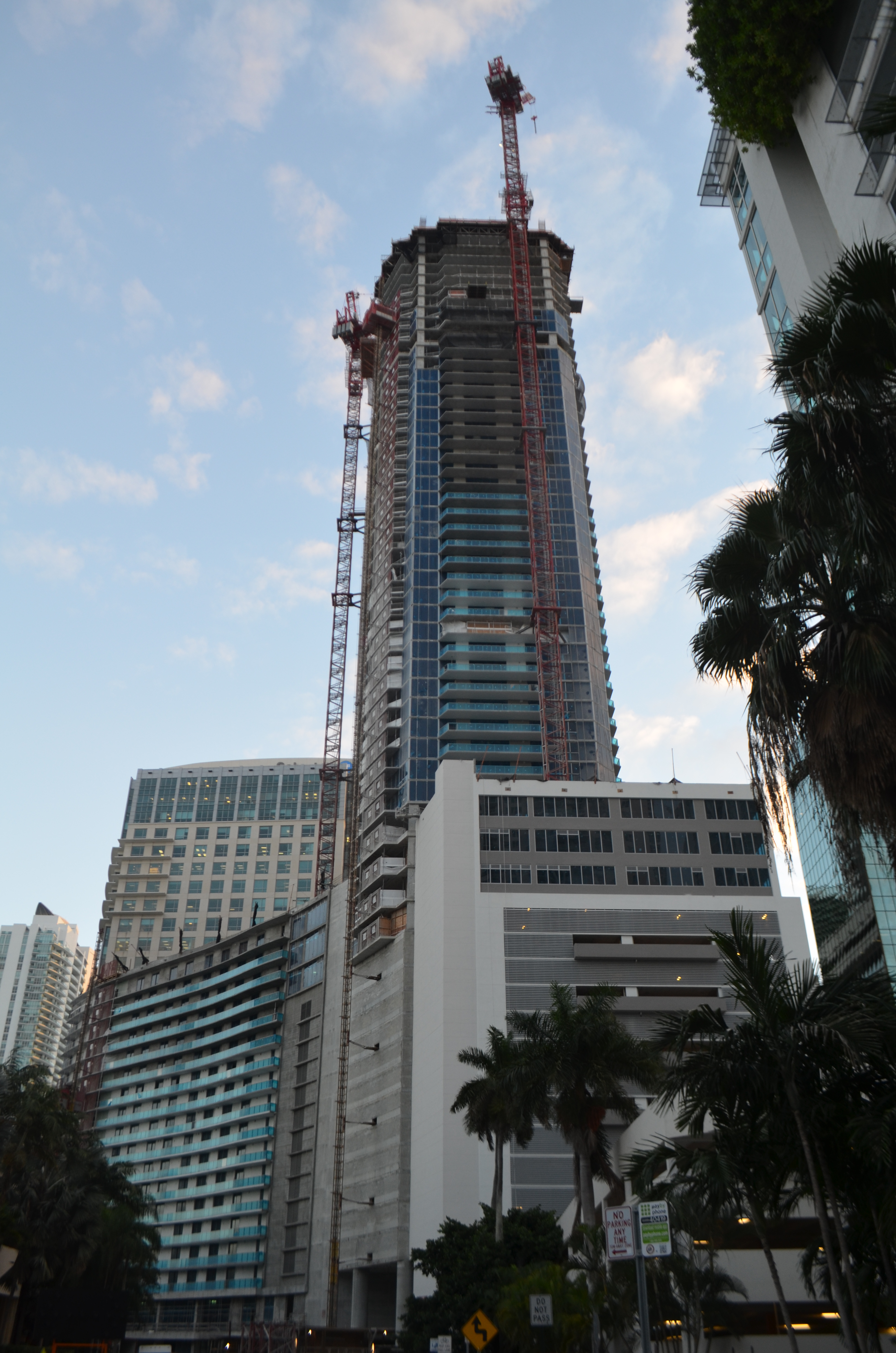
Panorama Tower under construction in October 2016 at about 60 floors with large multi-use pedestal (primarily parking) seen from Brickell Bay Drive

=== Financing ===
In 2014, the building became the first development in the city of Miami to be accepted into the EB-5 visa program. When the application was submitted in late 2012, it was stated that this immigrant investment system could fund about 15% to 20% of the project. However, later estimates were placed lower despite high demand that was exceeding the limit of 10,000 visas per year (throughout the country).

Panorama Tower is in the class of apartment buildings that have seen increase in value even into a market slowdown in 2017.

== See also ==
- List of tallest buildings in Miami
- One Bayfront Plaza
- Waldorf Astoria Miami
- The Towers by Foster + Partners

== Notes ==
A. ^ ^{a} The FAA individually reviews and occasionally reduces the ultimate height of structures over 200 feet (61 m) or in presumed hazard areas, such as near airports. While under construction, the cranes are expected to temporarily surpass 1,000 feet (305 m).

B. ^ ^{a} ^{b} The project, situated in a highly dynamic market, has undergone many revisions. Additionally, online sources often conflict, use old data, or are modified from their original text. One source from 2013 quoted 128 hotel rooms.

Records
| Preceded by Four Seasons Hotel Miami | Tallest building in Miami; 2017–2026; 265 m | Succeeded by Cipriani Residences Miami |
| Preceded by Four Seasons Hotel Miami | Tallest building in Florida; 2017–2026; 265 m | Succeeded by Cipriani Residences Miami |
