= Deutch =

Deutch is a surname. Notable people with the name include:

- Howard Deutch, American film director
- John M. Deutch, former U.S. Deputy Secretary of Defense and Director of Central Intelligence
- Madelyn Deutch, American actress
- Mark Deutch, Russian journalist and columnist
- Roni Lynn Deutch, disbarred American tax attorney
- Ted Deutch, Democratic congressman representing the state of Florida
- Yosef Eliyahu Deutch, Jerusalem rabbi and philanthropist
- Yossi Daitsh, also transliterated as Yossi Deutch, Israeli politician
- Zoey Deutch, American actress
