= Hyatt Grand Central New York =

Hotel in Manhattan, New York

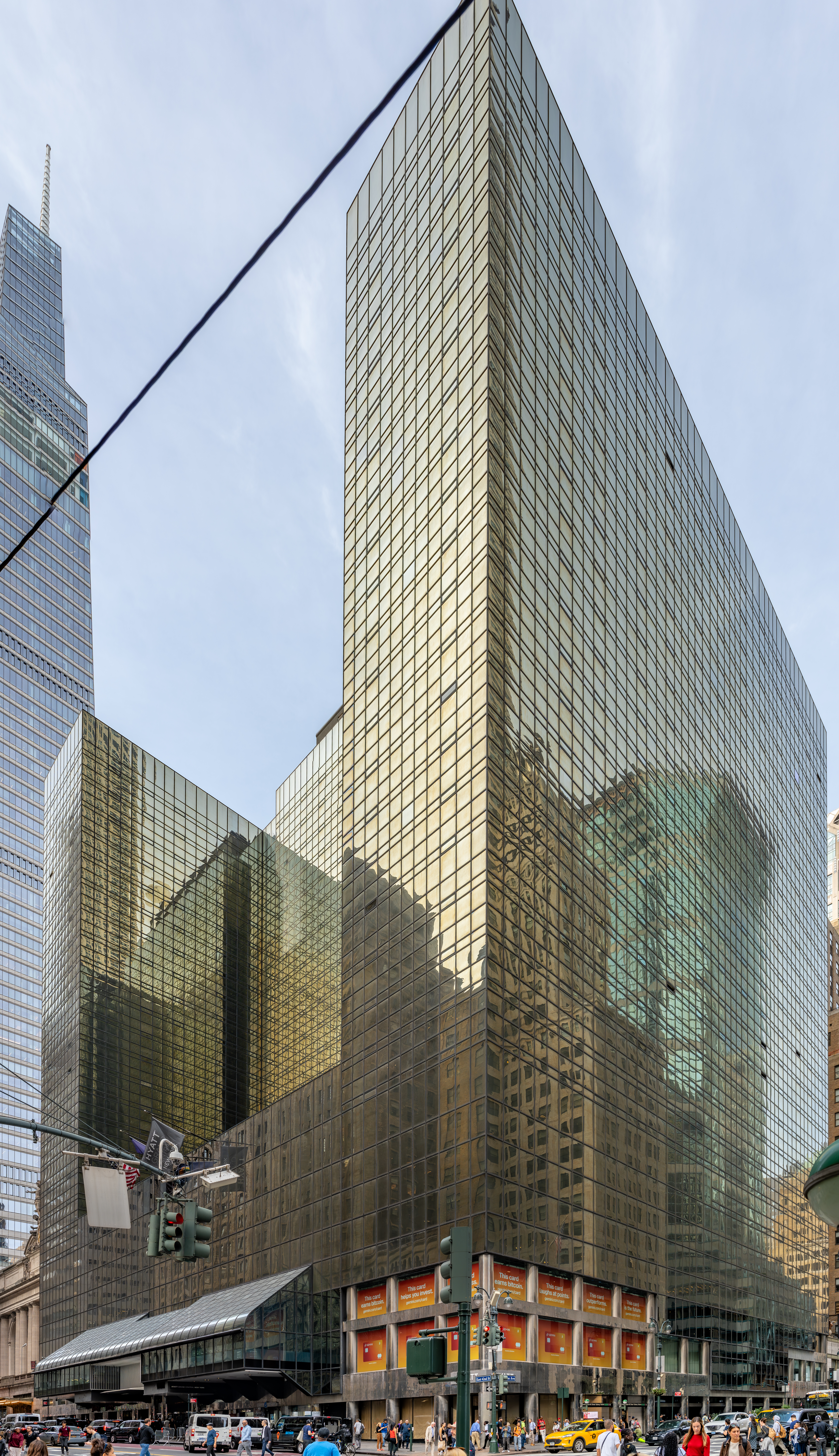
- Hyatt Grand Central New York as seen from the southeast, at Lexington Avenue and 42nd Street
- Interactive map highlighting the hotel's location
- Hotel chain: Hyatt Hotels

General information
- Location: Manhattan, New York, US, 109 East 42nd Street
- Coordinates: 40°45′08″N 73°58′35″W
- Opening: January 28, 1919
- Renovated: September 25, 1980
- Owner: Hyatt
- Operator: Hyatt

Height
- Height: 295 ft (90 m)

Technical details
- Floor count: 26

Design and construction
- Architect: Warren & Wetmore

Renovating team
- Architect: Gruzen Samton

Other information
- Number of rooms: 1306

Website
- https://newyork.grand.hyatt.com/

The Hyatt Grand Central New York is a hotel located at 109 East 42nd Street, adjoining Grand Central Terminal, in the Midtown Manhattan neighborhood of New York City. It operated as the 2,000-room Commodore Hotel between 1919 and 1976, before hotel chain Hyatt and real estate developer Donald Trump converted the hotel to the 1,400-room Grand Hyatt New York between 1978 and 1980. As of 2025, the hotel is planned to be replaced with a skyscraper named 175 Park Avenue.

The New York Central Railroad acquired the site in 1910 and started constructing the hotel in October 1916. The Commodore was designed by Warren & Wetmore, with the Fuller Company as the hotel's general contractor. The hotel was 295 feet (90 m), with up to 28 stories, and had an H-shaped floor plan and a brick-and-terracotta facade. It contained a large lobby designed in a manner resembling an Italian courtyard, as well as various dining rooms and ballrooms. The Commodore opened on January 28, 1919, and was originally operated by Bowman-Biltmore Hotels. Zeckendorf Hotels took over the Commodore's operation in 1958 before handing it to New York Central subsidiary Realty Hotels in 1966. Due to declining profits, the Commodore closed on May 18, 1976.

Trump and Hyatt offered in 1975 to take over the Commodore and renovate it into the Grand Hyatt. After the city government granted a tax abatement for the renovation, Trump and Hyatt completely remodeled the hotel from June 1978 to September 1980, spending $100 million and removing almost all of the Commodore's original decorations. The renovated hotel includes a glass facade, a three-story atrium, a restaurant cantilevered over a sidewalk, and the Commodore's original ballroom. With the deteriorating partnership between Trump and Hyatt, the Pritzker family, which operated the Grand Hyatt, acquired Trump's stake in the hotel in 1996. The Project Commodore skyscraper (later 175 Park Avenue) was announced for the site in 2019, and the Grand Hyatt temporarily closed in 2020 during the COVID-19 pandemic in New York City. The hotel reopened in 2021 as the Hyatt Grand Central. In 2026, developers applied for permits to construct 175 Park Avenue.

== Site ==
The Hyatt Grand Central New York is at 109 East 42nd Street in the Midtown Manhattan neighborhood of New York City. It occupies a rectangular site on the northwestern corner of Lexington Avenue and 42nd Street, near Pershing Square Plaza, and abuts the Park Avenue Viaduct to the west. The land lot covers about 57,282 ft^{2} (5,321.7 m^{2}), with a frontage of 200.83 ft (61.21 m) on Lexington Avenue and 275 ft (84 m) on 42nd Street.

The hotel shares the city block with Grand Central Terminal to the west, the MetLife Building to the northwest, and the Graybar Building and 450 Lexington Avenue to the north. Other nearby buildings include the Pershing Square Building and Bowery Savings Bank Building to the southwest, the Chanin Building to the south, the Socony-Mobil Building to the southeast, and the Chrysler Building to the east. The New York City Subway's Grand Central–42nd Street station, serving the 4, 5, 6, <6>, 7, <7>, and S trains, is located directly underneath the Hyatt Grand Central, and the Lexington Avenue Line platforms cut diagonally underneath the hotel. A subway entrance, with a stair and an elevator, is at the base of the hotel on Lexington Avenue.

The site was formerly occupied by the Hospital for Crippled Children. Before the hotel opened, the site occupied an entire city block, which was bounded by Depew Place to the west and 43rd Street to the north. The New York Central Railroad acquired the site in November 1910 as part of the construction of Grand Central Terminal.

== Architecture ==
The Hyatt Grand Central New York was originally known as the Commodore and was designed by Warren & Wetmore. The Fuller Company was the hotel's general contractor, although the project also involved numerous other contractors and engineers. Donald Trump and Hyatt renovated the hotel in the 1970s to designs by Gruzen & Partners and Der Scutt.

=== Commodore Hotel ===
When the Commodore opened, it contained 2,000 rooms and was either 26 or 28 stories high, as well as five basement stories. Because of superstition surrounding the number 13, the hotel did not have a thirteenth floor, nor did it have any rooms, mailboxes, elevators, or other fixtures with the number 13. The Commodore's facade was largely made of buff-colored brick with architectural terracotta trim; the first three stories were clad in Indiana Limestone. The hotel's lowest three stories occupied the entire site, while the floors above were shaped like an "H", with light courts to the north and south. At the top of the facade was a cornice with copper faces. The design of the nearby 245 Park Avenue was intended to complement not only the Commodore's original facade but also that of the nearby New York Biltmore Hotel, which was internally demolished in the early 1980s.

The hotel contained large amounts of materials, including 16,000 short tons (14,000 long tons; 15,000 t) of steel, 4.256 million bricks, 1.653 million terracotta blocks, and 1.035×10^{6} ft^{2} (96,200 m^{2}) of fireproof floor arches. The hotel's heating system included 4,400 radiators, supplied by a pair of 1,400 hp (1,000 kW) boilers in the basement. The ventilation system contained 17 fans that were capable of supplying 845,000 ft^{3} (23,900 m^{3}) of air per minute. The Commodore contained ten passenger elevators, eight service elevators, (Note: The passenger and service elevators all had a capacity of 3,000 lb (1,400 kg). The passenger elevators were capable of moving at 600 ft/min (180 m/min), while the service elevators moved at 450 ft/min (140 m/min). Nine of the passenger elevators and six of the service elevators ran from the lobby to the roof; one passenger elevator traveled from the ground level to the roof, and two of the freight elevators traveled from the basement to the roof.) one freight elevator, and two dumbwaiters. The hotel received water from the city's water supply system, with two intakes from 42nd Street and one from Lexington Avenue. The water-drainage system included two sewers to 42nd Street and one to Lexington Avenue, as well as sump pumps that drained water from the basements into the city's sewage system. The Commodore also contained a telautograph system with 75 stations, in addition to a fire alarm system, which at the time of the hotel's opening was an uncommon feature.

==== Ground level ====
The hotel's main entrance was at 42nd Street, just east of Grand Central Terminal. At ground level was a vestibule, consisting of a central hallway flanked by wide stairways that ascended to the lobby. The central hallway continued to the grill room and to the Commodore Passageway at the rear of the ground level. The grill room was at the rear of the vestibule and was used for supper and dancing; it was also known as the supper room. The grill room's entrance was on a terrace with stone walls and columns and a tiled floor. A short flight of steps descended to the main part of the grill room, which had chestnut walls with alcoves and leaded windows. On the ceiling were large beams painted by John B. Smeraldi, consisting of heraldic designs taken from illuminated manuscripts. The center of the grill room contained a dance floor measuring 45 by 25 ft (13.7 by 7.6 m).

At the north end of the ground story was the Commodore Passage, which still exists but was renamed the Lexington Passage after the Commodore closed. The passage leads directly to Grand Central Terminal and also connects to Lexington Avenue. This passageway also connects the hotel to the New York City Subway's Grand Central–42nd Street station via the terminal's corridors. Additional passageways connect with other buildings such as the Biltmore and Roosevelt hotels, the Yale Club Building, the Graybar Building, and the Chrysler Building. In the late 1990s, the passageway was redesigned as a shopping arcade with marble storefronts.

==== Lobby level ====
The lobby itself was designed in a manner resembling an Italian courtyard, surrounded by an arcade with a mezzanine above it. At the hotel's opening in 1919, architectural media described the Commodore's lobby as the largest hotel lobby in the world. The lobby had a metal-and-white-glass ceiling supported by light-colored stucco arches. There was a large palm tree in the middle of the lobby, which reached nearly to the ceiling. The walls were made of rough plaster above a wainscoting of soft Italian stone, and the paneling on the walls consisted of blue Italian tiles. The space was illuminated by vases with concealed lighting. At the center of the main lobby was a small retreat surrounded by palm trees.

The lobby's mezzanine contained a lounge, which was accessed by a wide staircase on the west wall and smaller stairs along the lobby's perimeter. The mezzanine railing contained boxes with plants. The mezzanine gallery was designed in the Italian Renaissance style, with flowers and palms. The walls contained satin hangings in blue, red, and yellow with green stripes, which were intended to complement the design of the floor. The gallery also had period furniture, including chairs and vases; the chairs were covered with blue and gold satin and velvet. Leading off this gallery were various writing rooms, the barber shop, the manicure shop, and the Commodore Hotel's executive offices, as well as numerous small alcoves and retreats.

Men's and women's rooms were positioned on opposite sides of the lobby. West of the lobby were offices, a stock-brokers' room, check rooms, a men's writing room, an English-style men's restaurant, telephones, telegraph services, and other business functions. On the lobby's west wall was a cafe with natural-oak wainscoting; a blue-and-gold carpet; Flemish oak chairs; and a ceiling with white-and-green plaster frescoes. East of the lobby, and a few steps above it, was the palm room, where after-dinner coffee and afternoon tea were served. The palm room was separated from the lobby by large majolica vases with palm trees. Behind the palm room was the main dining room, which contained a walnut wainscoting and a purple, green, and rose-colored vaulted ceiling in low relief. Next to the main dining room were the lobby supper room and the breakfast room, both designed in a similar manner to the main dining room. Stairs led from the dining room to the mezzanine, the hair-dressing parlor, and ladies' public rooms.

The hotel's kitchen was on the same level as the men's restaurant and the main dining room; stairs led down to the street-level grill room. The kitchen was capable of serving 10,000 meals per day, including 4,000 meals for employees. The kitchen was divided into several departments. These included a main kitchen, measuring 200 by 64 ft (61 by 20 m) wide; a separate kitchen for banquets, measuring 145 by 35 ft (44 by 11 m) wide; and a "preparatory kitchen" above the main kitchen, which was used for food preparation. Paper slips with guests' orders were delivered to the kitchen via a series of pneumatic tubes, and dumbwaiters connected the kitchen with each guestroom floor.

==== Ballrooms and other spaces ====
When the hotel was built, the New-York Tribune called the main ballroom "the largest private ballroom of any hotel in the world". The space was described as being in the French Empire style. It covered 180 by 78 ft (55 by 24 m) and was originally decorated in white, purple, and gold, with green accents. The main ballroom could accommodate up to 3,000 guests for entertainments such as plays, and it could seat 2,000 guests during banquets. The room had 56 boxes, connected by a promenade and split across two tiers. This arrangement, inspired by the layout of seats in a Mexican bullring, was intended to maximize the number of boxes for sale during charity events, as well as provide sufficient space for a dance floor below. Above the ballroom was a roof garden for tea and luncheons. The ballroom was redecorated in coral and black during a 1937 renovation, with a carpet in yellow, blue, and tan.

Two smaller ballrooms opened off the main ballroom and could be used separately or in tandem. These ballrooms contained silk and satin tapestries in the Louis XV style, as well as black-and-green satin chairs. To the north of the main ballroom was a vestibule that spanned the entire width of the room. Three chandeliers were hung from the vestibule's high ceiling, which was painted blue and white, and a carpet with "Old World designs" covered the marble floors. The western end of the vestibule was accessed to a direct entrance from the Park Avenue Viaduct. The hotel also had a vehicular elevator from 42nd Street, which ascended to the viaduct level and could carry up to 10,000 lb (4,500 kg).

Another popular spot was the Century Room, which had its own orchestra. The Billboard magazine described the Century Room in 1947 as "one of the top name [orchestra] spots in the city". Major bands played at the Century Room from the 1930s to 1948, when the Century also started booking smaller bands. The shows in the Century Room were discontinued permanently in 1949 after the federal government imposed a 20 percent excise tax on such shows, and the Century Room became a luncheon room. Other amenities included a parking garage, which the Commodore shared with the Biltmore and the Hotel Manhattan, as well as a children's playroom.

==== Rooms ====
The hotel had 2,000 rooms when it opened. Each room faced either the street or a light court, and all guestrooms had bathrooms. Rooms on the light courts received more sunlight than rooms on the street, as the light courts were wider than any of the surrounding streets. Initially, approximately 1,000 rooms had rates of $2.50 a night, advertised as "a room and a bath for two and a half"; the remaining rooms cost $3 to $4 a night. Each guestroom floor was staffed by its own "floor clerk" who was stationed outside the elevators. Acting as a concierge for their respective story, the floor clerk coordinated room service, provided supplies, and obtained tickets and schedules for guests, among other tasks.

When the Commodore opened, the corridors and rooms all had gray-and-black carpets above two layers of linings. The rooms had translucent curtains and shades that could be unhung, allowing each room to be ventilated during the summer and winter. Each bedroom typically contained a bed, a dressing table, two small chairs, a large armchair, a small table with a telephone, and small writing tables with lamps. The bedrooms also had ornate light fixtures suspended from the ceiling. Each bathroom had a cold-water tap, as well as a shower and an illuminated wall mirror, which were novel features at the time of the hotel's construction.

=== Grand Hyatt New York ===
The rebuilt hotel was 32 stories high with 1,400 rooms. The Grand Hyatt also had five restaurants with a combined 2,000 seats, as well as 65,000 ft^{2} (6,000 m^{2}) of retail space. The retail space was designed to be easily converted to a casino, but this conversion never happened, as gambling in the state remained illegal.

==== Lobby ====
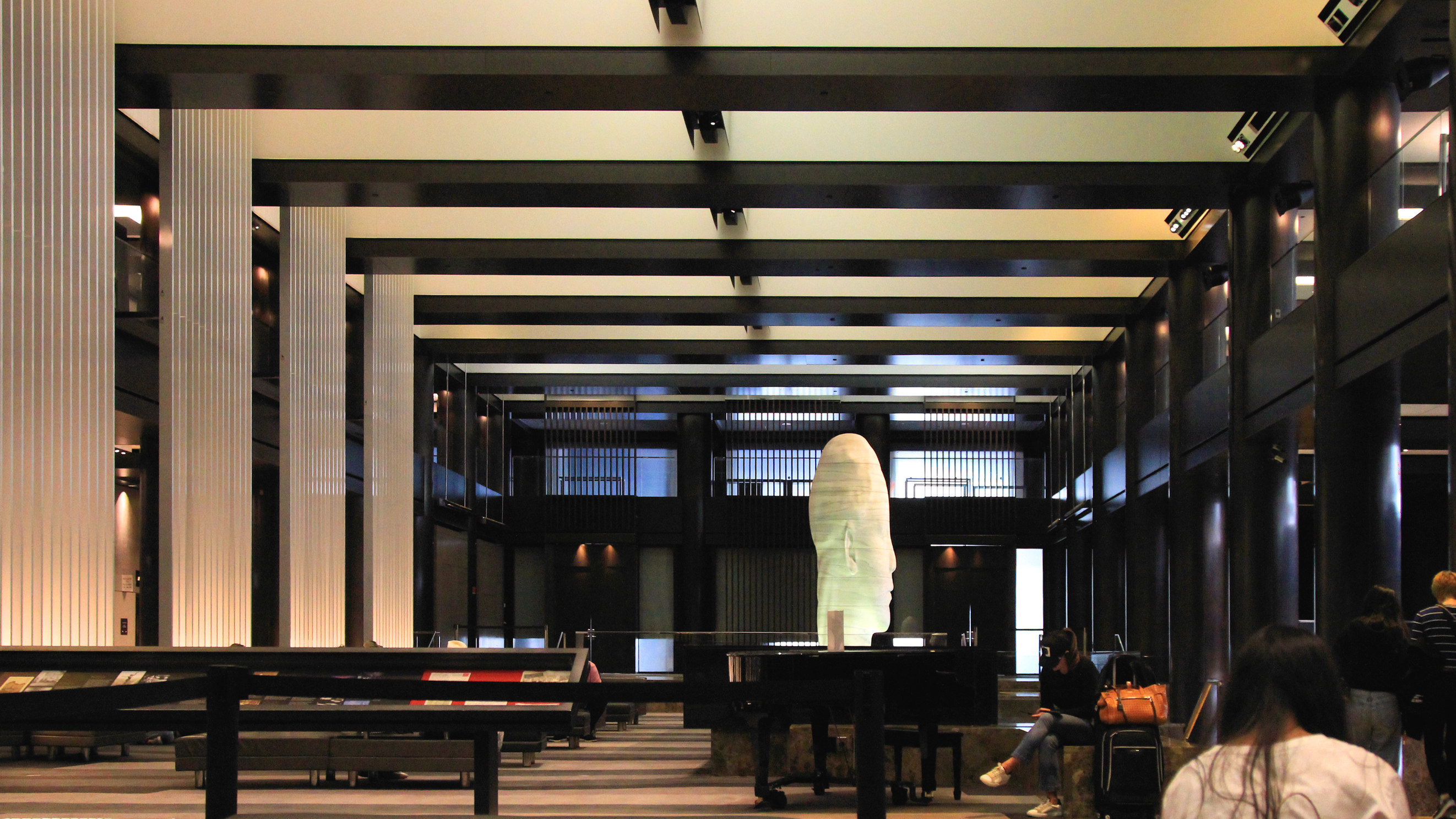
The lobby as seen in 2022

Trump had wanted to redesign the lobby as a "big atrium", but this was impossible because of the presence of the Commodore's original interior columns. Furthermore, the lobby had a relatively low ceiling because the original ballroom had to be preserved. The lobby covered 20,000 ft^{2} (1,900 m^{2}), measured 275 ft (84 m) long, and was three stories high. A set of escalators led to the lobby from a street-level foyer one story below. The renovated lobby was originally clad with Italian Paradiso marble and contained mirrored walls and large bronzed columns. The center of the lobby had a cascading fountain and a brass sculpture by Peter Lobello, which measured 100 ft (30 m) high. (Note: The brass sculpture is sometimes described as measuring 71 ft (22 m) or 77 ft (23 m) high.) After the renovation in 2013, the lobby was clad in stone and dark wood, laid in a carpet with gray stripes and furnished with black leather chairs. The ceiling was retrofitted with uplights that changed color depending on the time of the day. The registration and concierge desks were made of white quartz. The lobby's fountain was also reduced in size.

During the early-2010s renovation, Jaume Plensa designed a pair of 10 ft-high (3.0 m) sculptures of female heads for the lobby; known as Awilda and Chloe, the sculptures were intended to resemble moai heads. One of the sculptures was placed on an onyx wall, while the other was placed atop the fountain. On the lobby's rear wall was a blackened-steel archway that led to Market, a grab-and-go restaurant that operated 24 hours a day. Market contained concrete counters, glass displays, wooden floors, and tiled walls.

==== Amenity spaces ====
The renovated hotel includes a second-story restaurant cantilevered over the 42nd Street sidewalk; the restaurant measures 170 ft (52 m) wide. Because the restaurant overhangs a public sidewalk, the New York City Board of Estimate had to approve plans for the restaurant, and the Grand Hyatt's operators had to pay an annual fee to the city government. The space was originally a cocktail lounge called the Sun Garden. In the early 2010s, the former lounge was converted into a restaurant called New York Central, which covers 6,000 ft^{2} (560 m^{2}). As part of the renovation, the firm of Bentel & Bentel covered the lounge with white louvers. The renovated restaurant includes multiple tiers of seating that slope downward in the direction of the lobby, as well as a ceiling sculpture designed by Bentel & Bentel. The restaurant includes a lounge and a private dining area.

Next to the restaurant was a wine gallery with white-quartz counters and gray-marble wall. The wine gallery included a 30 ft-long (9.1 m) glass artwork by Per Fronth, which depicted oceanic scenes. One of the service elevators, known as the "flying kitchen", was equipped with a telephone and used for room service.

The grand ballroom was one of the few parts of the Commodore Hotel preserved when it was renovated in the 1970s. The space, on the ballroom level (three stories above ground), was renamed the Empire State Ballroom and expanded to 20,000 ft^{2} (1,900 m^{2}) during the renovation. The ballroom retains its carved ceiling measuring 27 ft (8.2 m) high. There are also metal grilles that resembled the large windows in Grand Central's Main Concourse, as well as chandeliers that consisted of 7,000 pieces of art glass. The Empire State Ballroom could be divided into five sections and could fit 100 to 1,500 guests. There are numerous smaller ballrooms on the mezzanine and conference levels.

A 4,400 ft^{2} (410 m^{2}) event venue called the Gallery On Lex was added during the hotel's 2010s renovation. The event venue is on the ground floor near the Lexington Passage. It contains a foyer with artwork, stone floors, and leather furniture. This leads to an open-plan meeting space with stone counters, wooden floors, two wooden "pavilions", and a glass wall in the front. Also on the ground floor is the Manhattan Ballroom and a foyer for that ballroom.

==== Rooms ====
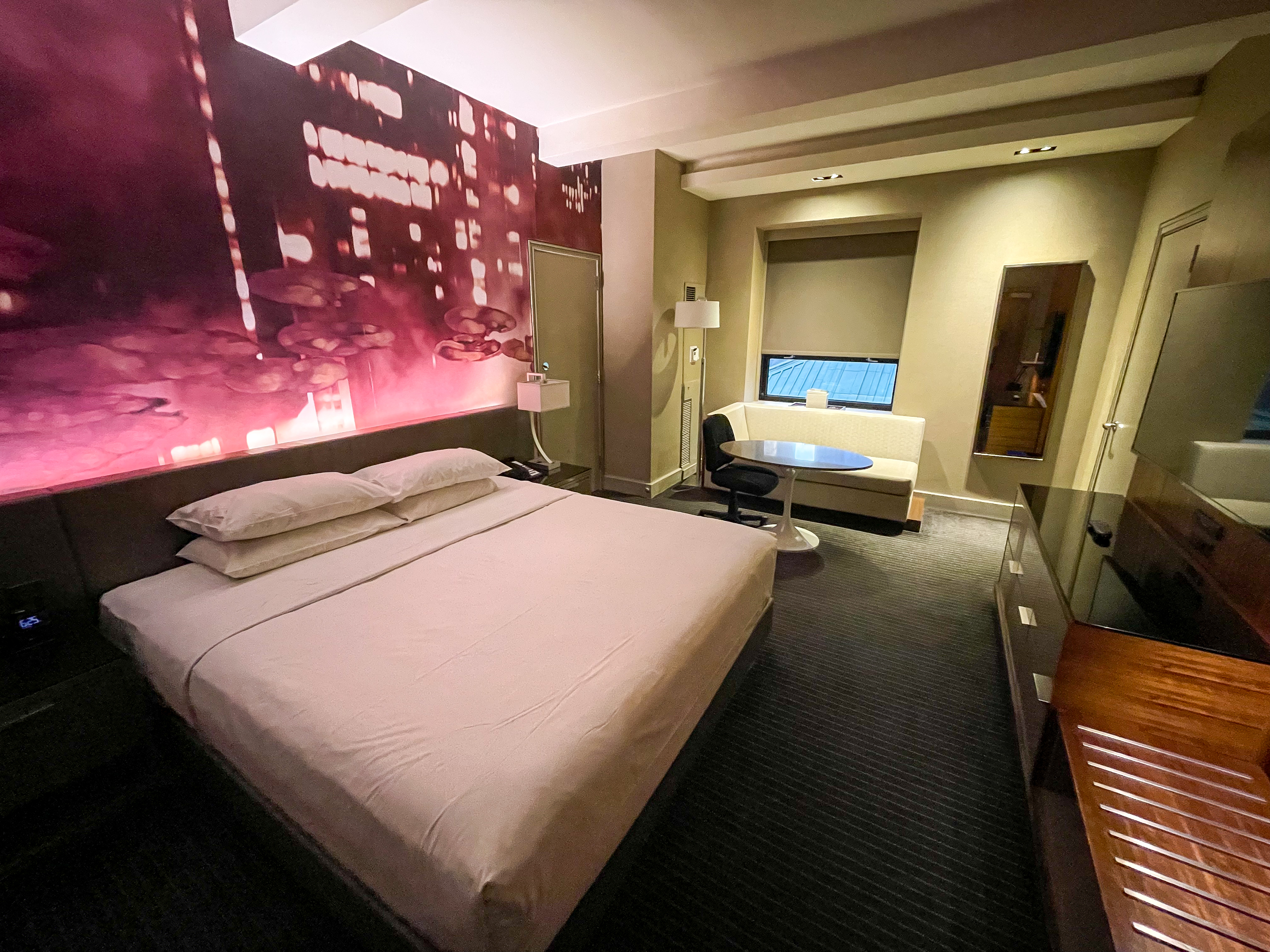
A bedroom in the hotel in 2023

There were originally 1,407 rooms, including 125 guestroom suites. These rooms were arranged in 38 different layouts because of site constraints. According to the New York Daily News, the rooms originally included 576 twin-sized beds and 549 king-sized beds, as well as "17 sitting suites, 88 junior suites, 30 VIP suites, 4 deluxe suites, 2 executive suites and just one presidential suite". GKR Design Consultants and Dale Keller & Associates designed the original furniture in the renovated Grand Hyatt. The decorations included brass-framed mirrors, curved wooden furniture, and upholstered seats. Guestrooms started on the sixth story above ground level, which at Trump's request was labeled as floor 14. Although the renovation architects opposed this floor numbering system, Hyatt endorsed Trump's decision.

Looney & Associates redesigned most of the suites and rooms in the early 2010s; after this renovation, there were 1,306 rooms, including 51 suites. The renovated rooms are furnished with Australian walnut furniture and various types of textiles. The rooms also include indirect lighting, and each of the beds has a headboard designed by Fronth. In addition, Looney & Associates designed twenty VIP suites, themed as either lofts or modern residences. The loft suites include walnut furniture and other "masculine" design features, while the residence suites carry a more neutral color palette. George Wong Design also designed four premier suites, which were inspired by pieds-à-terre and are themed to either uptown Manhattan townhouses or downtown Manhattan lofts.

== History ==
In the 19th century, New York Central Railroad lines north of Grand Central Depot in Midtown Manhattan were served exclusively by steam locomotives, and the rising traffic soon caused accumulations of smoke and soot in the Park Avenue Tunnel, the only approach to the depot. After a fatal crash in the tunnel in 1902, the New York state legislature passed a law to ban all steam trains in Manhattan by 1908. New York Central's vice president William J. Wilgus proposed electrifying the line and building a new electric-train terminal underground, a plan that was implemented almost in its entirety. The old Grand Central Depot was torn down in phases and replaced by the current Grand Central Terminal. Construction on Grand Central Terminal started in 1903, and the new terminal was opened on February 2, 1913. Passenger traffic on the commuter lines into Grand Central more than doubled in the years following the terminal's completion.

The terminal spurred development in the surrounding area, particularly in Terminal City, a commercial and office district created above where the tracks were covered. Terminal City soon became Manhattan's most desirable commercial and office district. A 1920 New York Times article said, "With its hotels, office buildings, apartments and underground Streets it not only is a wonderful railroad terminal, but also a great civic centre." The Commodore was one of several hotels developed in Terminal City, along with other hostelries such as the Roosevelt, the Biltmore, and the Barclay.

=== Development ===
==== Planning ====
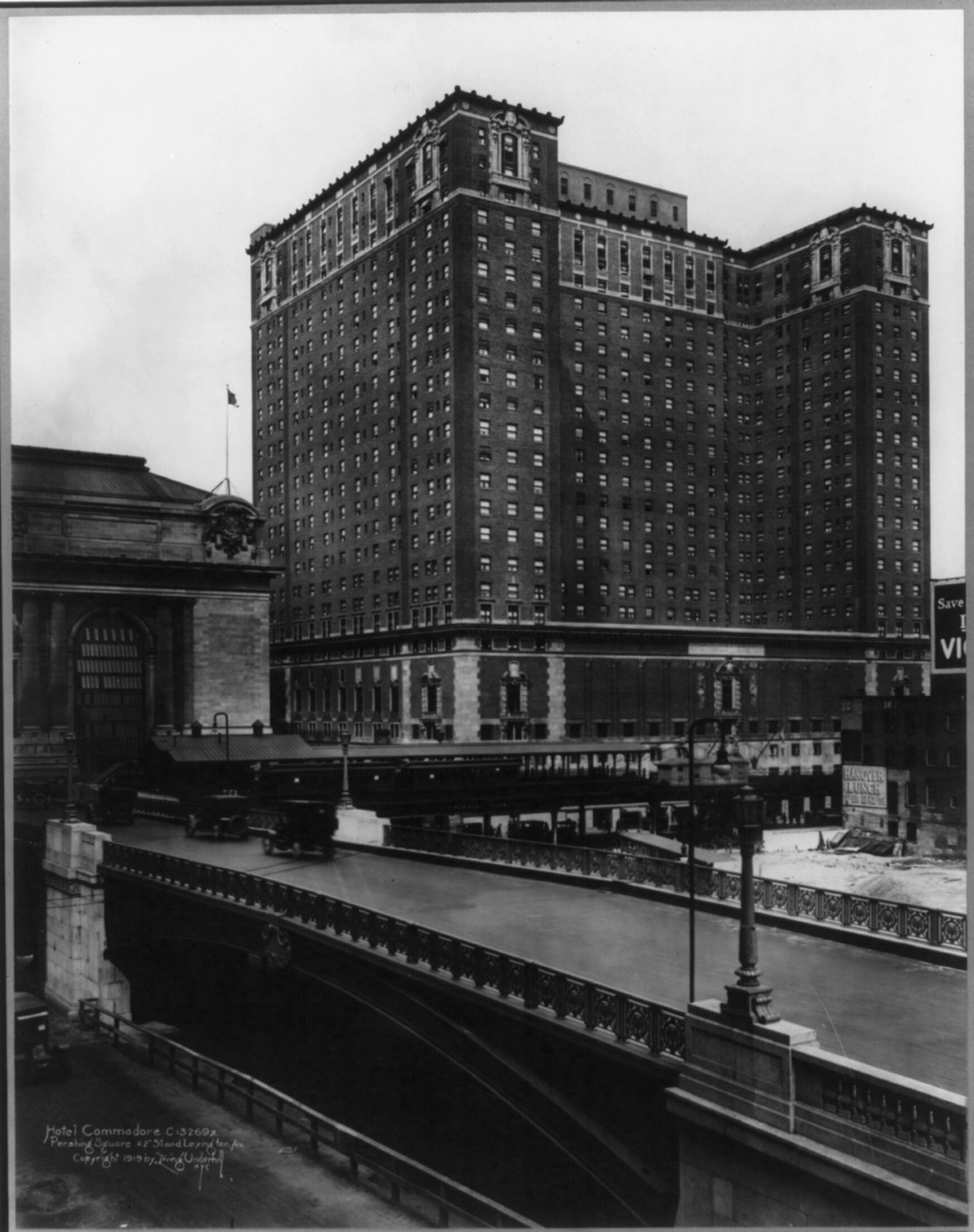
View of the hotel in 1919

The New York Central acquired several lots on the west side of Lexington Avenue between 42nd and 43rd Streets in November 1910; the lots had formerly housed the site of the Hospital for Crippled Children. The railroad had already acquired multiple adjacent lots on the north side of 42nd Street several years prior. The following year, news media reported that the New York Central was considering erecting a hotel on the site. The New York Times also said that the railroad initially considered leasing the hotel to H. C. Griswold. When Grand Central Terminal opened in February 1913, the New York Central was already clearing the site of the old hospital. The hotel was to be named the Commodore after "Commodore" Cornelius Vanderbilt, the New York Central's founder.

As part of the Dual Contracts, the Interborough Rapid Transit Company (IRT) planned a subway station for the IRT Lexington Avenue Line at 42nd Street, which was to run diagonally from Park Avenue in the southwest to Lexington Avenue in the northeast. Because the station was partially located under the Children's Hospital site, the Public Service Commission had to acquire an easement from the New York Central, which would enable the commission to build part of the station under the proposed hotel. The commission was unwilling to pay the New York Central's asking price for the easement, so the IRT modified its plans in April 1913 to avoid the hospital site entirely. The Public Service Commission voted on the modification in June 1913, and the new route was adopted that November. However, the commission voted in favor of the original diagonal route in February 1914. The commission subsequently acquired the easement in February 1915 for $902,500.

==== Construction ====
The New York State Realty and Terminal Company, a division of the New York Central, leased the hotel to John McEntee Bowman in January 1916. Bowman paid $175,000 a year for 21 years, with two renewal options. In addition, Bowman was obligated to pay 91 percent of the taxes and six percent of the total construction cost every year. The Commodore became part of the Bowman-Biltmore Hotels chain in 1918 after Bowman and rival hotel operator Benjamin L. M. Bates agreed to merge their respective companies. The New York Central filed plans with the New York City Department of Buildings in May 1916. The hotel, to be designed by Warren and Wetmore, was planned to be 26 stories tall and cost $6 million.

The Metropolitan Life Insurance Company gave the New York Central a $4.5 million loan for the site in September 1916. The Real Estate Record wrote at the time: "the release of such an enormous amount of money into a single building project is being regarded as highly significant inasmuch as there has been a marked tendency on the part of many builders to hold their projects in abeyance" during World War I. The excavations for the subway station had been completed by this point, and the George A. Fuller Company, the hotel's general contractor, took over the site. Construction commenced in October 1916; the project was expected to cost $6 million. Francis T. Gilling and several assistants spent six months creating a plaster model of the hotel, which was exhibited in several cities during 1917. Warren and Wetmore also drew up plans for a small airplane hangar north of the hotel.

The project involved numerous extremely large material orders, including a contract for 159,000 pieces of silverware and 1.06×10^{6} ft^{2} (98,000 m^{2}) of mesh reinforcement. The hotel's completion was delayed by supply-chain issues and steel shortages during World War I, although the hotel's managers had awarded almost all construction contracts before the beginning of the war. Most of the steel beams were delivered by truck, train, or barge, but in at least one case, a large girder was delivered by a pack of 18 horses. Even after the American Bridge Company had finished manufacturing steel beams for the hotel, these were sometimes delayed due to domestic steel embargoes during World War I. Deliveries of limestone, linen, and carpets were also delayed. Some of the rivets used in the hotel's frame had to be mailed to the construction site. In addition, rising labor and material prices increased the hotel's cost. By early 1918, the hotel was expected to cost $7.5 million, of which the furnishings were to cost $2 million. The Commodore's steel frame topped out on July 25, 1918.

=== Commodore Hotel operation ===
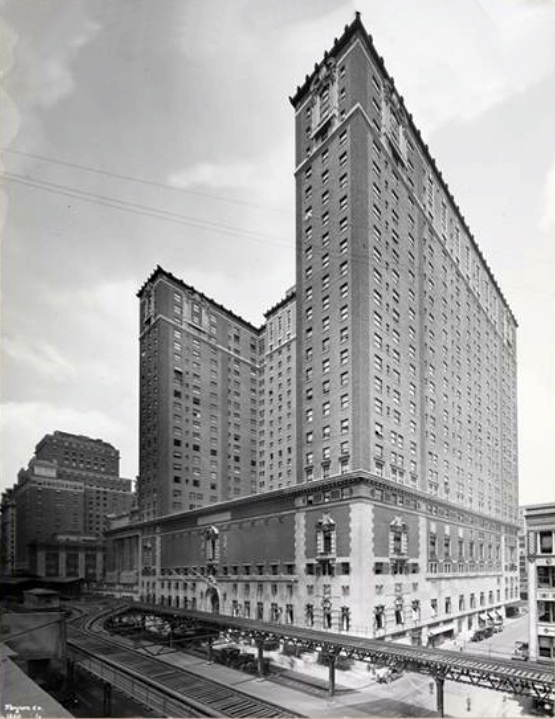
The Commodore Hotel, 1921

==== Opening and Biltmore-Bowman operation ====
The Commodore opened on January 28, 1919. The Commodore's managers mailed out 10,000 invitations for the hotel's opening, and hundreds of businesspeople from across the United States had reserved rooms for the hotel's opening day. A women's club opened within the hotel in March 1919. The Commodore's opening coincided with an increase in the number of passengers that used Grand Central Terminal, in part because the subway station under the hotel had opened one year prior.

During the hotel's first decade, it hosted such events as car shows, charity balls, a circus, fashion shows, and wrestling matches. The Commodore also hosted a party in 1924 to celebrate the removal of the Grand Central elevated station on 42nd Street, which had been directly above the hotel's main entrance. U.S. president Calvin Coolidge attended a large party at the Commodore in 1925 to celebrate the 100th anniversary of 42nd Street's opening. Bowman also hosted a circus in 1927, with an elephant in the grand ballroom, to impress other hoteliers. By 1930, the Commodore was the second-most valuable hotel in New York City (after the Savoy-Plaza Hotel), with an assessed value of $16.3 million. Bowman continued to operate the Commodore until he died in 1931, and David Mulligan took over as Bowman-Biltmore's president the next year.

Frank J. Crohan began operating the Commodore after he became president of Bowman-Biltmore in 1934. The Commodore began serving alcoholic drinks in December 1933 after Prohibition in the United States was repealed, although patrons could initially order drinks from rolling carts. After New York state repealed a Prohibition-era ban on standing bars in May 1934, Bowman-Biltmore Hotels installed a 125 ft-long (38 m) bar in the Commodore. That October, the Commodore's managers opened an English-style grill room, decorated with recessed lighting and wooden panels. Biltmore-Bowman added a 165 ft-long (50 m) bar at the Commodore in 1936, hiring 25 bartenders. The hotel was renovated in 1937 for $750,000; according to Crohan, this was the first major renovation of the Commodore in its history. The project involved renovating three ballrooms and all 2,000 guest rooms; installing ten new elevators; and adding a new kitchen and grill room. The renovations were completed by 1939.

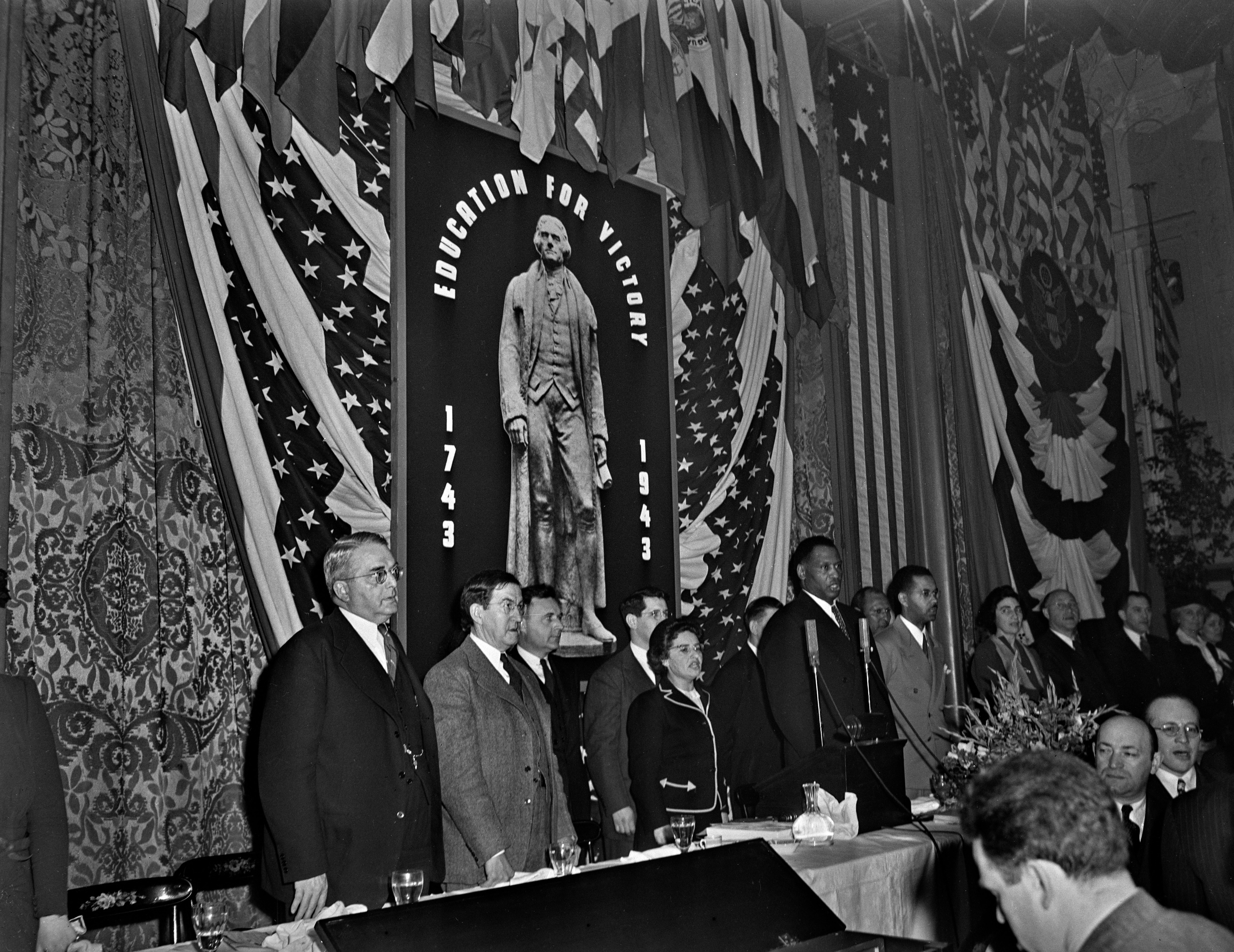
Paul Robeson leads members of the Teachers Union in song at a luncheon at the Commodore Hotel, April 17, 1943

Crohan died in 1940, and Martin Sweeny was appointed as the Commodore's general manager. The hotel's guests during this time included Republican Party presidential candidate Wendell Willkie, who established the personal headquarters of his 1940 election campaign at the hotel. The Officers Service Committee also occupied space in the hotel during World War II; at the end of the war, the committee's space became a bureau for United Nations delegations. An air-conditioning system was installed in the Century Room in 1946, allowing the room to operate during the summer, and the entire hotel was air-conditioned by the next year. On April 21, 1949, the Commodore Hotel hosted the 1949 BAA draft in what became the final year of league operations under the Basketball Association of America name. Sweeny died in 1950, shortly after becoming chairman of the Commodore Hotel's board. The storefront at the corner of Lexington Avenue and 42nd Street was leased by a drugstore in 1954 and was extensively remodeled at a cost of $200,000.

==== Zeckendorf and Realty Hotels operation ====
Webb and Knapp, led by developer William Zeckendorf, offered to buy all of the Commodore Hotel's outstanding common stock in October 1957 for $18 per share. At the time, Webb and Knapp wished to control 8,000 hotel rooms in New York City. Zeckendorf Hotels, took over the Commodore in September 1958, acquiring 96 percent of the stock. As part of a leaseback agreement, Zeckendorf immediately sold the lease on the land to Joseph I. Lubin for $6 million, subleasing the site from Lubin for three years. Zeckendorf also began looking to sell his lease of the hotel building itself in early 1960, although he would continue to operate the hotel. Claude Philippe was hired as the hotel's general manager in June 1960, but Philippe resigned seven months later to work for the nearby Summit Hotel.

The Glickman Corporation (renamed the Franchard Corporation in 1963) bought the land lease from Lubin in November 1960. Glickman's lease ran until the end of December 1967, after which control of the hotel would revert to the New York Central. Around the same time, Zeckendorf contemplated selling his leases of the Astor, Commodore, and Manhattan hotels to raise money for the Freedomland U.S.A. amusement park in the Bronx, in which Zeckendorf also owned a majority stake. This plan was approved in June 1961, and Freedomland U.S.A. assumed the leases on the three hotels. The hotel was renovated the same year. As part of the project, a cocktail lounge and two large obelisks were installed in the lobby, and two ballrooms were also refurbished. In 1962, amid competition from other hotels, the Biltmore, Commodore, and Roosevelt hotels formed an alliance to attract conventions with 1,500 to 5,000 guests. The alliance allowed the three hotels to host a single convention across 4,000 guestrooms, 90 meeting rooms, 15 restaurants, and 50,000 ft^{2} (4,600 m^{2}) of exhibit space.

The 78013 Corporation, the subsidiary of Webb and Knapp that operated the hotel, owed over $850,000 in back rent by February 1964. Amid continued rent disputes, Franchard evicted Webb and Knapp as the hotel's operator in May 1964 and began managing the Commodore directly. This prompted a dispute between Franchard and several companies that had supplied materials for the hotel, which were collectively owed $590,000. As a result, in September 1964, a creditors' committee was established to resolve the dispute.

Realty Hotels, a subsidiary of the New York Central, agreed in November 1966 to take over the Commodore from Franchard, effective January 1, 1968. The chain formally acquired the hotel's leasehold in June 1967, several months ahead of schedule. Realty Hotels immediately announced plans to spend $6 million renovating the Commodore. During the 1960s, Realty Hotels replaced about half of the manually operated elevators at the Barclay, Biltmore, Commodore, and Roosevelt, and it renovated these hotels as part of a $22 million modernization program. Realty Hotels' president said the renovations had helped attract new and returning customers to the hotels.

=== Conversion into Grand Hyatt ===
The New York Central had experienced financial decline during the 1960s, merging with the Pennsylvania Railroad in 1968 to form the Penn Central Railroad. Penn Central continued to face financial issues and failed to make mortgage payments. By late 1970, the Commodore Hotel was facing foreclosure, as were several other buildings that Penn Central owned around Grand Central Terminal. After Penn Central went bankrupt that year, the company sought to sell its properties, including the land below the Commodore Hotel. The buildings were placed for auction in October 1971, but the proceedings were delayed for several years. Penn Central, which had placed all of Realty Hotels' properties for sale, subsequently withdrew its offer to sell the hotels. Both Penn Central and the Commodore continued to struggle financially, and the hotel recorded a 49 percent occupancy rate in 1974. Penn Central, which had not paid taxes on the site since June 1970, owed over $10 million in back taxes by the beginning of 1976. The Commodore could not be converted to an apartment building because of its large size and inefficient room layouts. Even razing the hotel would cost $7 million.

==== Trump offer and closure ====
Donald Trump's Trump Organization and the Pritzker family's Hyatt hotel chain entered a formal agreement in May 1975, making a joint offer to purchase the Commodore. Trump planned to buy the hotel for $10 million and convert it into a hotel called the Hyatt Regency, spending $70 million on renovations. Trump had one year to purchase the hotel and another 18 months to conduct renovations, after which Hyatt would take over the hotel. Trump planned to re-clad the hotel with a glass facade and expand its public rooms, providing additional space for conventions. The project was planned to create 1,500 jobs, boosting the city's struggling tourism industry, and was one of Trump's first major projects. One unidentified real-estate expert said that, if Trump succeeded in redeveloping the Commodore, "you could call him 'the William Zeckendorf of Bad Times'". Trump wanted to buy an option from Penn Central, allowing him to purchase the Commodore at a later date, but he did not have $250,000 on hand to pay for the option. City officials asked Trump to supply a copy of his agreement with Penn Central, but Trump sent the option agreement paperwork without signatures.

Penn Central spent $1 million on renovations in 1975, remodeling the Commodore's bar and renaming it the "New York, New York". In early May 1976, Penn Central asset manager Victor Palmieri announced that the Commodore would be closed the next week, having lost $1.3 million in 1975. By then, the hotel's occupancy rate had decreased to 33 percent, and hotel officials said the Commodore was projected to lose $4.6 million that year. Trump was still negotiating to buy the option. The hotel closed on May 18, 1976, and Penn Central laid off all of the hotel's 500 employees. The Commodore hosted 19 guests and four small events on its last day of operation; the very last guest had not been notified of the hotel's closure until the day before.

==== Tax abatement and financing ====
Then-mayor Abraham Beame had proposed a tax abatement in January 1976 to encourage commercial and industrial development in New York City. Beame and Trump's father Fred had long been politically connected, and Beame's deputy mayor Stanley M. Friedman championed the tax-abatement program, even as the city experienced the worst fiscal crisis in its history. Trump formally requested a tax abatement from city officials in March 1976; he was the first developer to request a tax abatement under Beame's program. Hyman B. Cantor of the Carter Hotels Corporation made another offer for the Commodore in April 1976, while city officials continued to discuss the tax abatement. Although Beame originally planned to give the hotel a 50-year tax abatement, he later proposed reducing the tax abatement to 35 years, to which Trump objected. By then, several members of the New York City Council had expressed concerns about the proposed abatement, as did rival developers and hotel operators. Opponents said the city government would forfeit $4 million a year in tax revenue if the abatement was approved.

The New York City Board of Estimate approved the Commodore's tax abatement two days after the hotel closed. To receive the abatement, Trump would pay Penn Central $10 million and resell the hotel for $1 to the Urban Development Corporation (UDC), a New York state government agency, which would lease back the hotel to Trump Organization subsidiary Wembley Realty Inc. for 99 years. Trump would make payments in lieu of taxes during the hotel's renovation. The hotel's rent would be discounted for 40 years, and the rent payments would increase gradually to $2.27 million after 40 years. The tax abatement would allow Trump and Hyatt to save $56 million over forty years. If the hotel earned more than $5.5 million per year, the city government would receive half of the hotel's profits. Law professor Leon Wein filed a lawsuit, alleging that the tax abatement violated the Constitution of New York, but the New York Court of Appeals (the highest court in New York state) ruled in December 1977 that the tax abatement was constitutional.

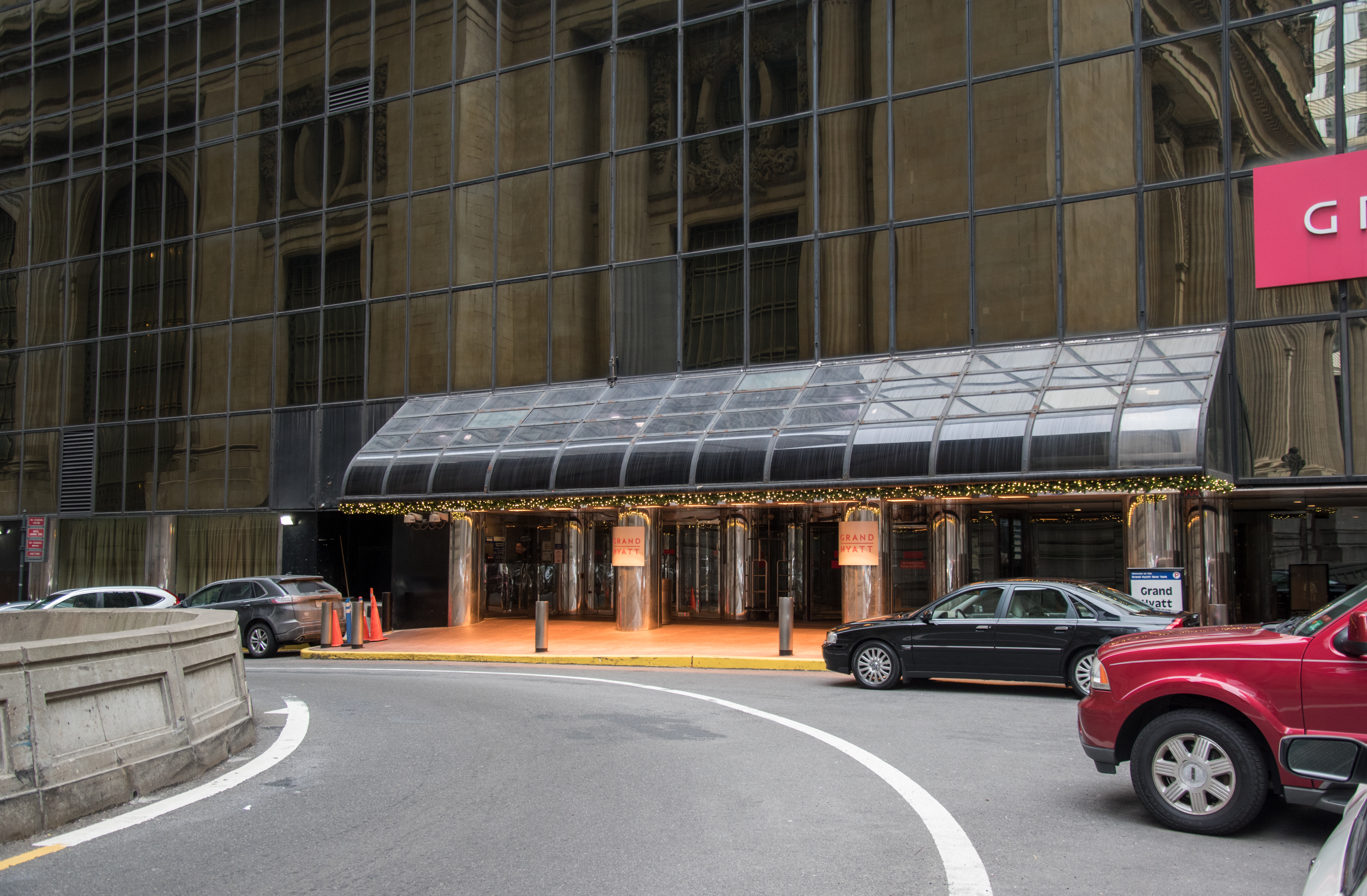
The hotel's taxi stand on the Park Avenue Viaduct

The Commodore remained largely empty after its closure, except for some stores that continued to operate at ground level. One apparel-store owner at the Commodore's base refused to vacate the site and ultimately signed a long-term lease with Trump. Penn Central agreed in September 1976 to pay the city government $5 million after it sold the hotel to Trump, and the UDC agreed to buy the hotel from Trump the same month. Trump exercised his option for the hotel in January 1977, placing a down payment of $250,000. Penn Central's trustees next asked a federal district court for permission to sell the Commodore, as the railroad was bankrupt and could not sell the hotel by itself. In December 1977, the Bowery Savings Bank agreed to lend Trump and Hyatt $45 million for the Commodore's redevelopment, and the Equitable Life Assurance Society agreed to lend $35 million. Trump and Hyatt were to provide the remaining $20 million. Ultimately, Trump received $140 million in long-term financing and short-term loans for the Hyatt Regency's renovation.

==== Renovation ====
In preparation for the hotel's renovation, National Content Liquidators started auctioning off about one million furnishings and decorations in January 1978. Thousands of people visited the hotel on the first day of the auction. Trump announced in May 1978 that he would start renovating the hotel. He wanted the hotel to reopen in time for the completion of Javits Center, a convention center on Manhattan's west side. HRH Construction, a division of the Starrett Housing Corporation, received the general contract for the Commodore's renovation. The firm of Gruzen & Partners was hired to redesign the hotel, and architect Der Scutt (who later designed Trump Tower) was hired as a design consultant. Trump hired Barbara Greene of GKR Design Consultants, as well as Dale Keller & Associates, to design the interiors. A groundbreaking ceremony for the Hyatt Regency took place on June 28, 1978, with Beame, mayor Ed Koch, and governor Hugh Carey in attendance.

The Hyatt Regency was one of several hotels in midtown Manhattan to be developed during the late 1970s. The hotel's renovation was temporarily delayed by a labor strike in August 1978. The city government originally planned a sales tax on construction materials to fund other improvements in the area, including $2 million for a cleaning of Grand Central Terminal's facade. The city waived the sales tax after Trump agreed to fund the facade-restoration project directly. As part of the project, a mezzanine was constructed between the Hyatt hotel and the terminal. The project had become known as the Grand Hyatt New York by early 1979. The Commodore was gutted almost entirely to its steel frame, although the Trump Organization salvaged 200 copper faces on the original facade's cornice. The Hyatt's new facade was being installed by the end of 1979. Hotel officials began conducting job interviews in mid-1980, and they hired Fred Alexander as the hotel's first general manager. The renovation ultimately cost $100 million. This amounted to approximately $80,000 per room, although Trump estimated that a new hotel on the same site would have cost twice as much.

=== Hyatt operation ===
==== Reopening and early years ====
The hotel officially reopened in September 1980 as the Grand Hyatt New York. The Grand Hyatt was one of 13 large hotels, with a combined 9,000 rooms, that had opened in New York City during the early 1980s. The Grand Hyatt's opening coincided with the revival of the surrounding area, although there was disagreement over whether the hotel's renovation impacted the neighborhood's revival. At the time of its reopening, all of the rooms had been booked, but, the next year, an unidentified hospitality-industry expert estimated that as many as 40 percent of the hotel's rooms were empty. Nonetheless, the Sun Garden bar quickly became popular with nearby office workers. The Grand Hyatt began hosting Major League Baseball teams during World Series games, accommodating all visiting MLB teams.

A restaurant called Trumpets opened within the hotel's base in early 1981. The same year, the Metropolitan Transportation Authority (MTA) announced that they planned to use eminent domain to acquire 3,600 sq ft (330 m^{2}) of the Grand Hyatt's basement and reconstruct a subway entrance there. Regional newspaper Newsday estimated that, in the first five years of the hotel's operation, the tax abatement saved Trump and Hyatt $5.5 million annually. Local civic group Grand Central Partnership installed floodlights on the hotel's facade in 1989, both for illuminating Grand Central Terminal and discouraging crime on nearby streets. The terminal's operators also proposed constructing a loading dock and garbage-collection facility next to the Grand Hyatt, but Trump opposed these plans. This loading dock, which separated the Grand Hyatt from the Graybar Building, was replaced in the 1990s with a pedestrian passageway.

==== Financial troubles and decline of partnership ====
In late 1989, state officials ordered the hotel to pay the city government $2.9 million in back rent, which the hotel had withheld in 1986 after changing its accounting procedures. An investigation by city auditors found that the hotel was missing basic financial records and was using procedures that violated Generally Accepted Accounting Principles. Mayor Koch asked the UDC to collect the rent from Trump, but the UDC declined to do so. New York City's auditor general had been investigating the case, but Koch's successor David Dinkins subsequently disbanded the auditor general's office. Several of Trump's companies were struggling financially by 1990, and he considered selling his stake in the Grand Hyatt to pay off outstanding debt. That June, Trump offered his stake in the Grand Hyatt as collateral for a $65 million syndicated loan from several banks. At the time, the hotel had a relatively high net operating income of $15.7 million; real-estate experts estimated that Trump's stake was worth between $157 million and $186 million. By the following year, Trump was negotiating to sell most of his stake in the Grand Hyatt to one of his lenders, Bankers Trust.

Trump and Hyatt's partnership deteriorated during the early 1990s. Trump sued several members of the Pritzker family in 1993, accusing them of racketeering; he sought full control of the hotel and $500 million in damages. Trump claimed that Hyatt wanted to force him out of the partnership because their agreement prevented the chain from operating other Hyatt-branded convention hotels in New York City. Due to a non-compete clause, Hyatt could not advertise the nearby UN Plaza Hotel as being part of the chain. Hyatt also wished to renovate the hotel for $35.7 million, funded equally by Trump and the Pritzkers, so the Grand Hyatt could "remain competitive" with other hotels. Trump initially agreed to pay for his half of the renovation, but he later reneged, claiming the repairs were too extravagant. When the Pritzkers opened arbitration proceedings to force Trump to pay for the renovations, the New York Supreme Court's Appellate Division granted a stay of proceedings in late 1993, blocking the arbitration proceedings.

The Pritzkers countersued in March 1994, alleging that Trump had violated their partnership by failing to remain solvent, using his share as collateral for loans, and refusing to fund his portion of the renovation. The Pritzkers also sued Bankers Trust and Chemical Bank, claiming that Trump had diluted the partnership by conveying his financial interest to his lenders while retaining veto power. Trump and the Pritzkers agreed to a settlement in mid-1995, and Trump and Hyatt announced in March 1996 that they would renovate the hotel for $25 million. Hughes Design Associates designed the renovation, which included updated furnishings and a new fitness center. The hotel continued to undergo renovations through mid-1997.

==== Pritzker family control ====
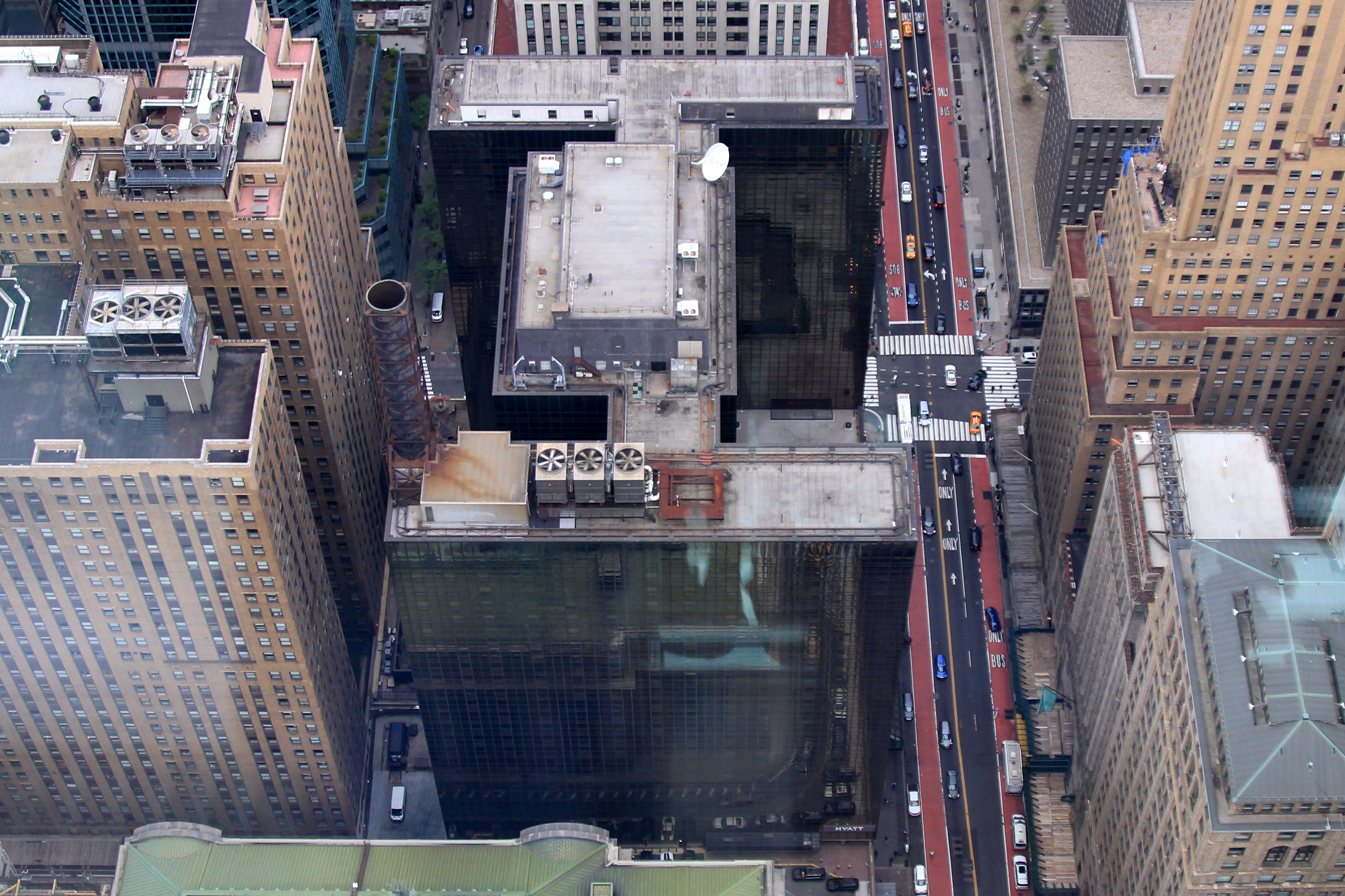
The H-shaped Hyatt Grand Central New York as seen from One Vanderbilt's observation deck

The Pritzkers bought Trump's share in the hotel for $140 million in October 1996, which lifted the non-compete clause against the UN Plaza. Following the acquisition, Hyatt owned a 99 percent stake in the hotel, while the Pritzker Family Philanthropic Fund owned the remaining share. By the early 2000s, the hotel's lobby was a popular place for informal meetings. Hyatt agreed to replace the hotel's cooling system in 2003 after over a thousand workers went on strike. The Metropolitan Transportation Authority (MTA), which operated Grand Central, repaired a steam room under the Grand Hyatt in 2005; the steam room supplied the terminal and had partially collapsed during the preceding decade. By 2007, the Grand Hyatt was the fourth-most valuable hotel in New York City, having been appraised at $300.9 million.

Hyatt announced in mid-2009 that it would spend $12 million renovating the Empire Ballroom. The next year, Hyatt commenced a wider-ranging renovation of the hotel for $130 million. The hotel remained open during the renovation, and only a few floors were closed at any given time. Carol and Paul Bentel of the firm Bentel & Bentel were hired to renovate the public spaces, while Looney & Associates redesigned most of the suites and rooms. During the renovation, a restaurant called New York Central opened next to the hotel's lobby in late 2010. In addition, Hyatt added the Market, a food market where customers could select what they wanted instead of waiting for room service. At the time, only about 50 daily guests ordered room service, while other guests chose to leave the hotel to eat. After the Market opened, Hyatt cut back its room-service hours.

The Grand Hyatt installed several green building features in early 2016, including a new exhaust-control system, LED lighting, and an updated HVAC system. In addition, as part of the development of the nearby One Vanderbilt skyscraper, the subway station under the hotel was renovated in the late 2010s. The project involved relocating several of the hotel's support columns, demolishing 40 percent of the Hyatt's basement to expand the subway mezzanine, and enlarging a subway entrance in another part of the hotel's base.

=== Hyatt Grand Central New York ===
The New York City government enacted the Midtown East rezoning in the 2010s; this allowed developers to transfer unused air rights from Grand Central Terminal to neighboring sites, enabling the construction of high-rise buildings on these sites. Developers expressed interest in redeveloping several sites around the terminal, including the Grand Hyatt. In February 2019, the media reported that TF Cornerstone, MSD Partners, and RXR Realty planned to redevelop the Grand Hyatt site. A new 2,600,000 ft^{2} (240,000 m^{2}) mixed-use structure with office and retail space, as well as a smaller hotel, would be built on the site. The proposal required approval from the state and city governments of New York, though no final agreement had been signed. Before the developers could construct the skyscraper, they had to buy out Hyatt's lease, which ran through 2077. At the time, the developers planned to close the hotel permanently after the end of 2020.

The Grand Hyatt New York was closed indefinitely in early 2020 following the onset of the COVID-19 pandemic in New York City. In November 2020, preliminary plans were revealed for an 83-story tower at 175 Park Avenue. Preliminary renderings were released in February 2021, and the New York City Council approved the plans that December. The hotel was supposed to have been closed permanently, but Hyatt officials decided to reopen the Grand Hyatt after the New York City Council passed legislation in September 2021. The legislation required hotels that closed due to the pandemic to pay severance to their employees if they did not reopen with at least 25 percent of their pre-pandemic staff.

The hotel reopened on November 1, 2021, and was rebranded as the Hyatt Grand Central New York. Upon its reopening, the Hyatt Grand Central largely served visitors from Europe, particularly those from the United Kingdom. The Hyatt Grand Central offered limited services, as its meeting facilities/function rooms, restaurants and bars remained closed; the hotel's permanent closure date was postponed to at least 2023. As of December 2023, the hotel's closure had been postponed because no major tenants had been found for the office building; work on Project Commodore was scheduled to start in 2026. As of March 2026, the hotel remains operational. In early 2026, the developers of 175 Park Avenue applied for permits to construct that building, with a projected completion date of 2032. Demolition of the Hyatt Grand Central is set to begin in early 2027.

== Critical reception ==
=== Original hotel ===
When the original Commodore Hotel opened, multiple media sources described the Commodore as one of the world's largest hotels. The American Architect magazine wrote that the Commodore "adds a very important architectural feature to a location that is bound to become one of New York's busiest civic centers". The New-York Tribune said the hotel "undoubtedly adds strength and decorum to the group of high-class hotels in the vicinity of Grand Central Terminal", while The New York Times wrote that the Commodore's completion made the surrounding area "the greatest hotel centre in the world". The Washington Post considered it to be "equal from the standpoint of architectural design" to the nearby Hotel Pennsylvania, which had opened the same week.

=== Grand Hyatt ===
Before the renovation of the Grand Hyatt New York began, Paul Goldberger of The New York Times said, "it is too bad that there was no willingness to consider a design in some material other than glass." Nonetheless, Goldberger praised some elements of the design, including the cantilevered restaurant, the large lobby, and an expanded ballroom. By the time the renovation was complete, Goldberger wrote: "It is the sort of flashy hotel one would expect in Atlanta or Houston, but certainly not in New York." The Architectural Guidebook to New York City referred to the facade as a "mirror box" and an "utter and inexcusable outrage". The Guidebook continued:

The old Commodore was a brick and masonry structure of appropriately modest and deferential design. The Grand Hyatt imposes its garish vacuity with a painful lack of concern about the way it relates to one of the most architecturally significant streets in America.

Conversely, Ada Louise Huxtable wrote that the Grand Hyatt's atrium had been adapted to the existing steel frame "with ingenuity and elegance, and the result is not only a vast improvement over the spiritless interior court that has become an overreaching cliche, but also—give or take a few details—one of the handsomest public spaces in New York." The Atlanta Constitution wrote that the atrium "seems vast" despite being only three stories high, while The New York Times said the lobby was a place for "sitting and watching the custom that flows back and forth before the eyes". Joseph Giovannini of the Times wrote that the lobby "exemplifies many of the architectural ideas of the 1970's and 80's, along with some of its cliches".

Shortly after the hotel reopened, reporters for Newsweek said that the "glistening mass of reflecting glass" seemed to be "a world apart from that grubby cluster of porn shops and X-rated movie theaters" along the section of 42nd Street within Times Square. A writer for The Washington Post said the Grand Hyatt "reaches for the present and future", in contrast to the Helmsley Palace Hotel, which had opened the same year but had "tried to embrace the past" by incorporating the historical Villard Houses.

== See also ==
- List of hotels in New York City
