= 175 Park Avenue =

Planned skyscraper in Manhattan, New York

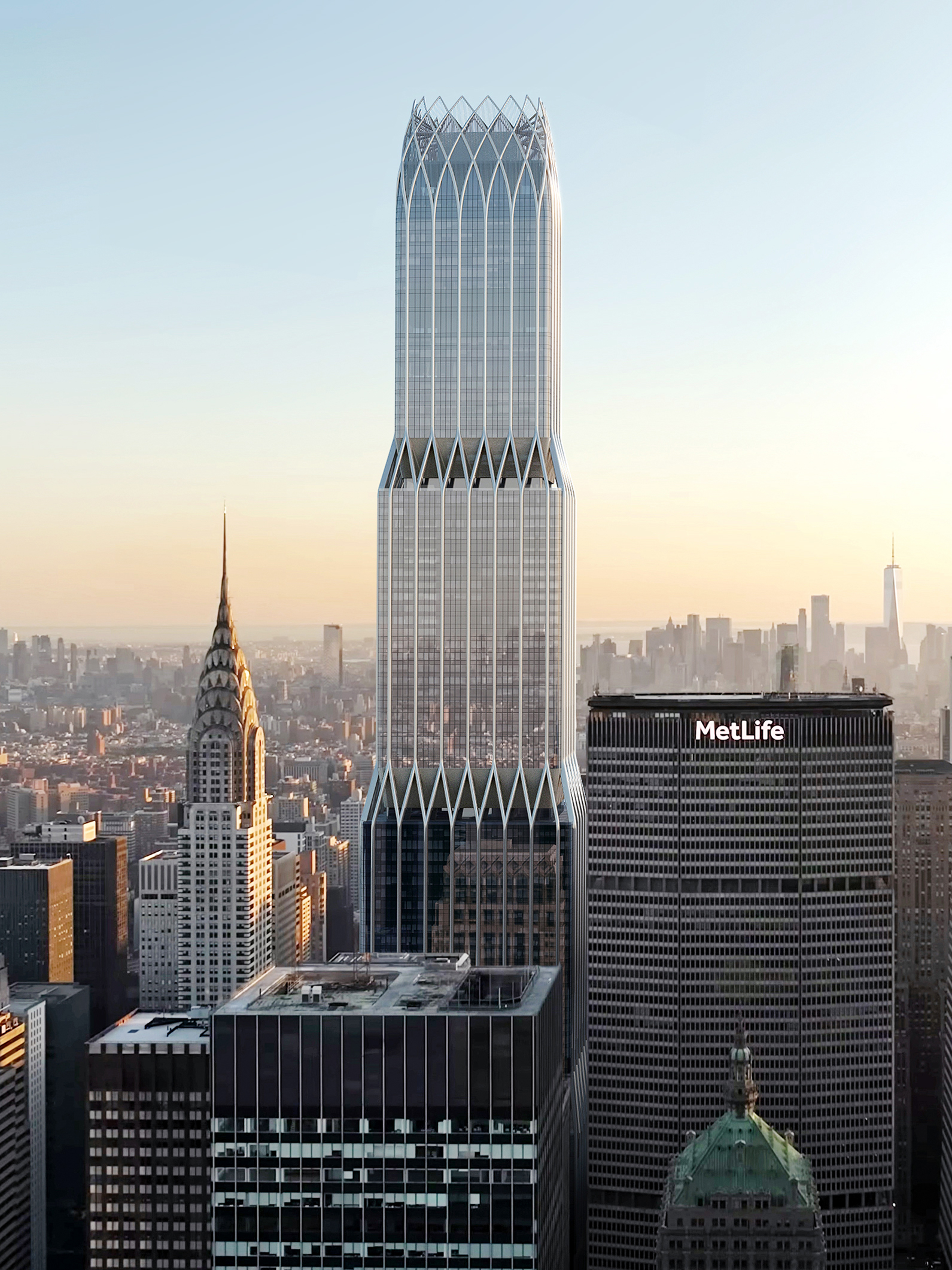
- Artist's impression

General information
- Status: Proposed
- Type: Mixed-use
- Location: 175 Park Avenue, New York, NY 10017, U.S.
- Coordinates: 40°45′07″N 73°58′37″W

Height
- Height: 1,581 feet (482 m)

Technical details
- Floor count: 95

Design and construction
- Architect: Skidmore, Owings & Merrill
- Developer: RXR Realty; TF Cornerstone
- Structural engineer: WSP Global

175 Park Avenue, formerly known as Project Commodore, is a proposed mixed-use supertall designed by Skidmore, Owings, & Merrill and developed by RXR Realty and TF Cornerstone that is to be built on the former site of the Commodore Hotel, currently the Hyatt Grand Central New York. As currently proposed, the structure would rise to a pinnacle height of 1,581 feet (482 m), with the tower containing office space, a Hyatt hotel, and ground-level and underground retail.

== Architecture ==
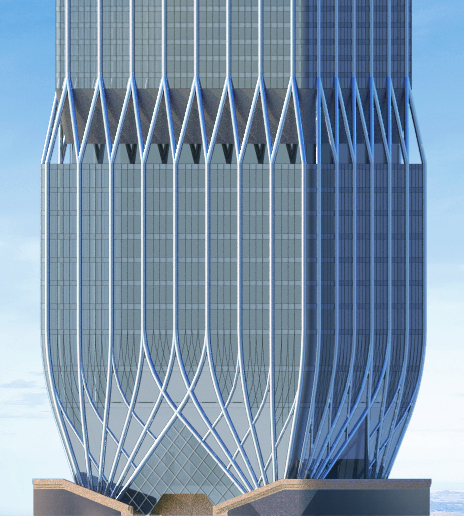
Illustrated elevation of the proposed tower's lobby

175 Park Avenue was designed by Skidmore, Owings, & Merrill, with WSP Global providing structural engineering services. The lobby of the building tapers outwards from its footprint in order to increase its visual separation from the adjacent Grand Central Terminal, and is defined by a web of interlaced steel columns which fan from several points at ground level, limited by the presence of rail infrastructure below the site. These columns are clad in a painted metal finish and continue for the height of the building. The tower is interspersed with outdoor terraces and culminates at a lattice crown, where the exterior columns again interlace echoing the design of the lobby facade. The inverted tapering of the building's base allows for an approximately 24,000-square-foot (2,200 m^{2}) elevated public terrace designed by James Corner Field Operations, wrapping around the building's base and accessible by stair and elevators from 42nd Street.

As first proposed in February 2021, the design called for four intermediate terraces, each framed by expressed parallel struts. By the time of its approval in December 2021, images released by RXR Realty revealed a revised design. The revised plan calls for three intermediate terrace levels and a reduced number of exterior columns, now offset at each terrace level by diagonal struts; these terraces span about 24,000 square feet (2,200 m^{2}). The design was intended to allude to the nearby Chrysler Building and Socony-Mobil Building. The terraces are not planned to include any restrooms, despite a shortage of public toilets in New York City.

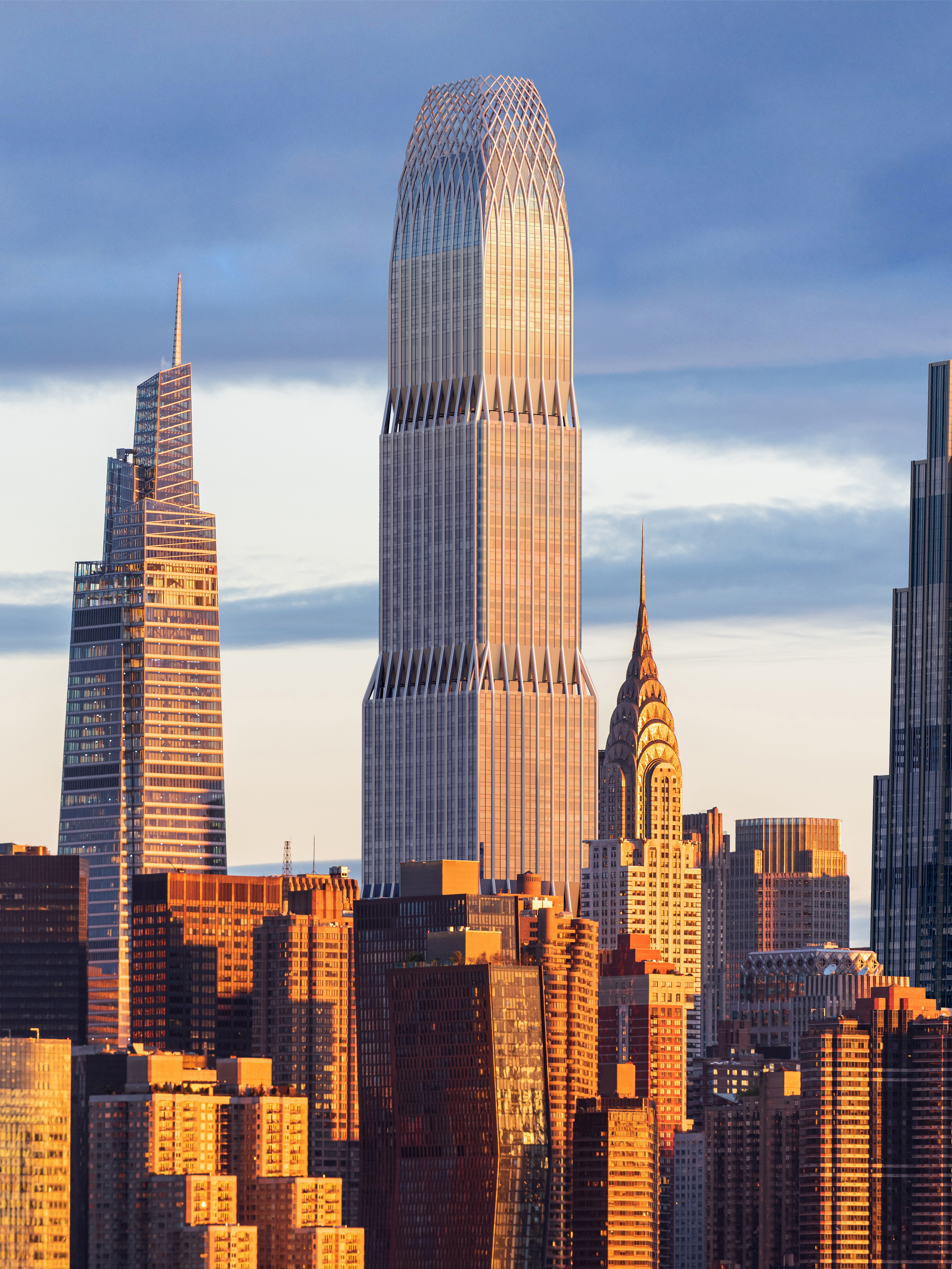
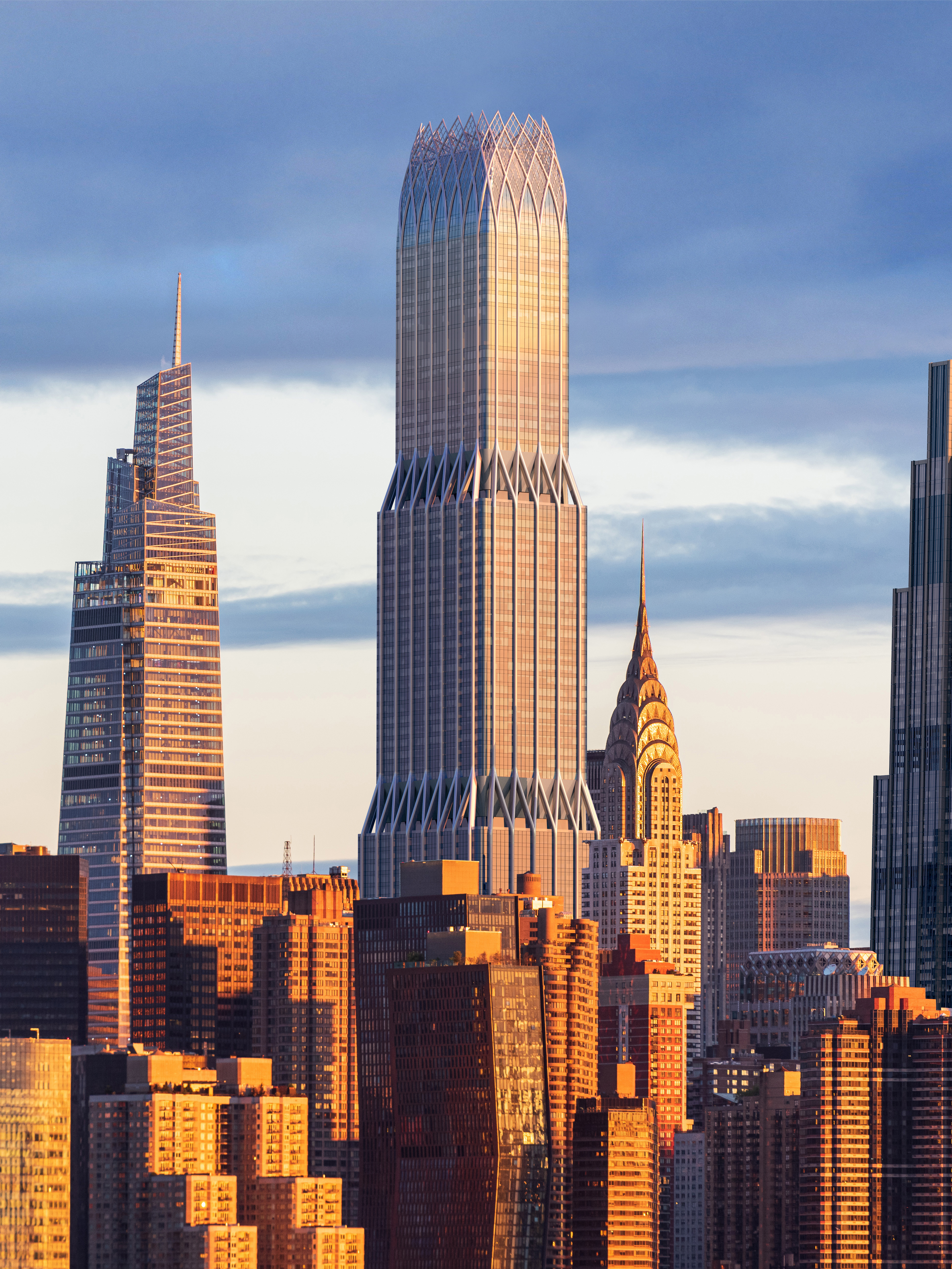
Left: The proposed design as revealed in February 2021.
Right: The current design revision as seen in a January 2026 Public Design Commission review presentation.

== History ==
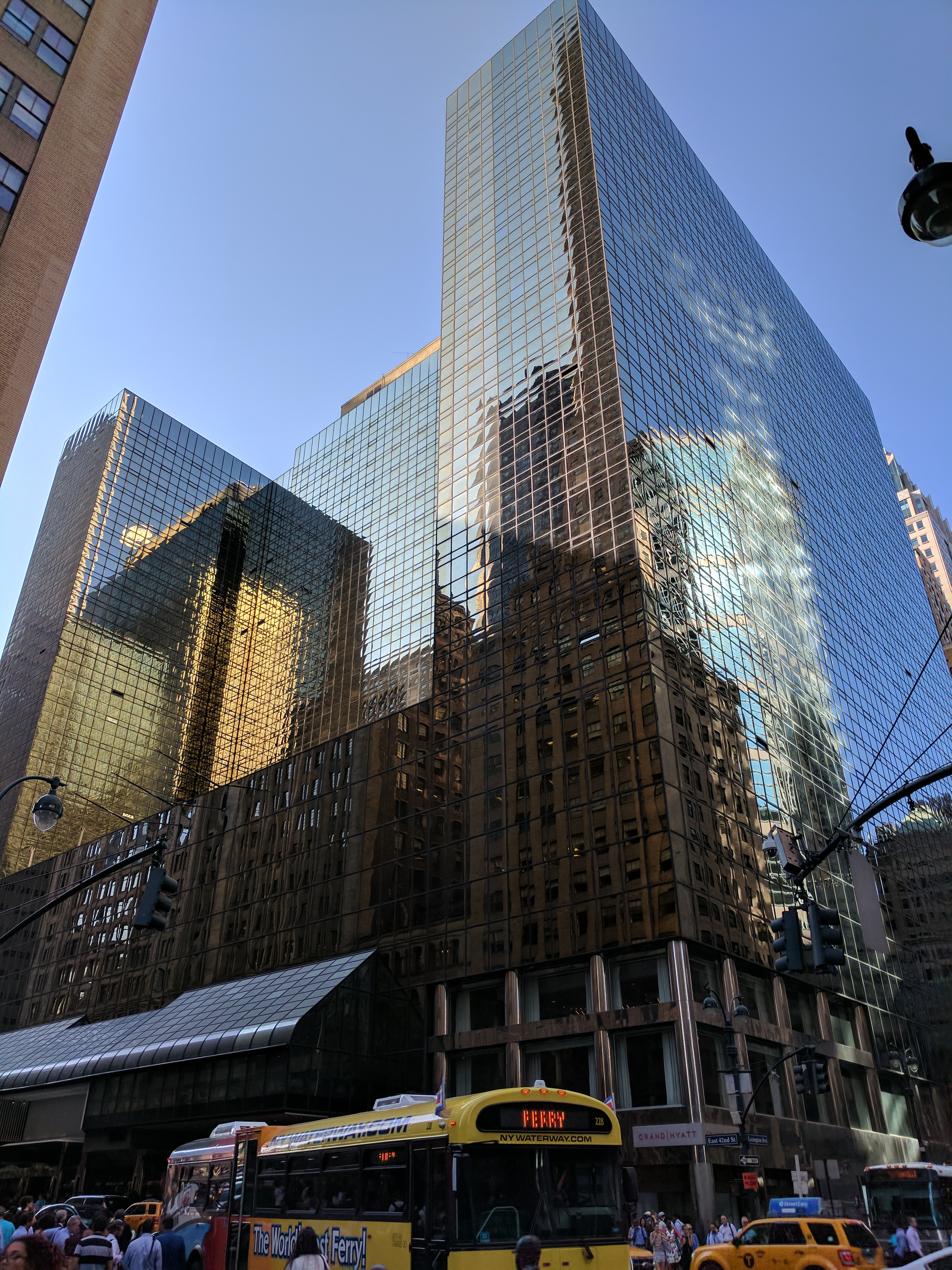
Hyatt Grand Central New York, the structure currently occupying the development's site

The New York City government enacted the Midtown East rezoning in the 2010s; this allowed developers to transfer unused air rights from Grand Central Terminal to neighboring sites, enabling the construction of high-rise buildings on these sites. Developers expressed interest in redeveloping several sites around the terminal, including the site of the Hyatt Grand Central New York. In February 2019, the media reported that TF Cornerstone, MSD Partners, and RXR Realty planned to redevelop the Grand Hyatt site. A new 2,600,000 ft^{2} (240,000 m^{2}) mixed-use structure with office and retail space, as well as a smaller hotel, would be built on the site. The proposal required approval from the state and city governments of New York, though no final agreement had been signed. Before the developers could construct the skyscraper, they had to buy out Hyatt's lease, which ran through 2077. At the time, the developers planned to close the hotel permanently after the end of 2020.

In November 2020, preliminary plans for an 83-story mixed-use tower on the site, known as Project Commodore, were revealed. The tower, designed by Skidmore, Owings & Merrill, would be 1,646 ft (502 m) tall, making it the second-tallest in New York City if completed. The structure would contain office space on the 7th through 63rd floors and a 500-room Grand Hyatt hotel on the 65th through 83rd floors. The basement, first, and second floors would contain retail, and the first floor would also connect to the adjacent railroad terminal and subway station. A public plaza and a stair to the Park Avenue Viaduct would also be built. If the project were approved, the demolition process would take 18 months, and the construction process would take 47 months with a preliminary completion date in 2030.

Preliminary renderings were released in February 2021, proposing a maximum height of 1,653 feet (504 m). The New York City Council approved the plans that December at a revised height of 1,575 feet (480 m), while a later article published by engineering firm WSP Global lists a height of 1,581 feet (482 m). In addition to a proposed 2.5 million square feet of commercial office space, the proposal includes a 200-room, 453,000-square-foot Hyatt hotel at its highest levels, as well as 10,000 square feet of ground-level and underground retail alongside an expanded transit hall and a new subway entrance on East 42nd Street. RXR Realty opened a leasing gallery for the development in the nearby One Vanderbilt in October 2023. Originally, the developers planned to demolish the hotel in 2023. In January 2025, the developers requested up to $4.84 billion in low-cost financing from the incoming U.S. presidential administration of Donald Trump. The development received preliminary approval from the city government in January 2026, and RXR Realty began meeting with investors that March to gauge their interest in providing $6.5 billion for the building. In late March 2026, building permits were filed.

== See also ==
- List of tallest buildings in New York City
- List of tallest buildings in the United States
