= Roni Lynn Deutch =

American lawyer (born 1963)

Roni Lynn Deutch (born October 21, 1963) is an American former tax attorney and the founder and president of the Roni Deutch professional tax corporation and tax centers.

== Early life and education ==
Deutch was born in southern California, on October 21, 1963. At the age of 11, she was the first girl in California to play in an all-boys Little League team. Deutch obtained a Bachelor of Arts (B.A.) in Pre-Law and Ethnic Studies from the University of California, Berkeley, a Juris Doctor (J.D.) from Western State University College of Law, and a Master of Laws (LL.M.) from the University of the Pacific, McGeorge School of Law. She was a member of the State Bar of California and the Sacramento County Bar Association.

== Career ==
In 1991, Deutch launched her law office in a one-bedroom condominium in Sacramento, California and in 2004, the firm was incorporated. She then launched her own retail tax preparation company in 2006 and one year later, she created RDTC, Inc., her tax preparation franchise company, and began selling retail tax preparation franchises under the name "Roni Deutch Tax Center." In 2009, Entrepreneur.com listed Roni Deutch Tax Center as one of the fastest growing franchise companies in the country. There are currently around 80 Roni Deutch Tax Center locations in 23 U.S. states, with a concentration in California, Nevada, and Arizona. The national headquarters are in Sacramento. The Professional Tax Corporation focuses on resolving U.S. federal tax issues for people who have problems with the Internal Revenue Service (IRS). The firm's specialty is facilitating settlements in the IRS programs Offer in Compromise, Installment Agreement, and Currently Not Collectible.

Deutch is a frequent columnist and television show guest on matters of taxation and personal finance. She is also the author of The Tax Lady's Guide to Beating the IRS and Saving Big Bucks on Your Taxes. Her second book, Surviving the Coming Tax Disaster, was published in October 2010. Deutch also keeps a blog focusing on fiscal issues as well as her hobbies of baseball and surfing.

In 2010, she worked with SIMZ Productions, a Sacramento-based production company, to film a documentary, "Death or Taxes". The film focuses in on the American taxation system and several stories of individual taxpayers who when overwhelmed by the debt and IRS collection tactics, took drastic steps - including even suicide - in response. It was received by multiple film festivals and won awards at the Los Angeles Movie Awards and Los Angeles Cinema Festival of Hollywood in 2010 and 2011.

=== Law practice closed ===
On May 12, 2011, Deutch announced that she was closing her law practice and that she would be surrendering her license to practice law. The California State Bar announced that it was conducting an investigation of Deutch. She denied allegations made against her by the State of California.

Deutch formally resigned from the California State Bar on May 20, 2011, after the State Bar Court recommended that she be disbarred. Deutch is no longer eligible to practice law.

== Controversy ==
New York City Department of Consumer Affairs (DCA) brought a lawsuit charging Deutch with misleading advertisements that allegedly fail to include key eligibility requirements in order to resolve back taxes with the Internal Revenue Service (IRS) under its Offer in Compromise program. The Offer in Compromise program enables taxpayers to resolve debts by entering into an agreement with the IRS for reduced payments, in which a majority of people do not qualify – a fact allegedly not evident in the Deutch advert. In 2006, she agreed to pay $300,000 to settle the lawsuit for deceptive advertising practices. A total of $200,000 was apportioned to affected victims of her deceptive practices, and $100,000 in fines.

On August 23, 2010, the office of the Attorney General of California announced that it would be filing a $34 million lawsuit against Deutch for allegedly "orchestrating a 'heartless scheme' that swindled thousands of people facing serious and expensive tax collection problems with the IRS." Roni Deutch responded to the charges by stating California Attorney General Jerry Brown is "engaging in election year politics" (Brown was running for governor in the November 2010 election at the time of the lawsuit, an election he ended up winning) and that she intends to fight the lawsuit.

A court in California has frozen all the assets of Roni Deutch. The "tax lady" as she was known and her company were sued for $34 million by several attorneys general.

In April 2011, the California attorney general's office asked a court to hold Roni Deutch in contempt of court and to imprison her for shredding millions of documents and withdrawing money to pay other outstanding debts. In May 2011, her attorney asked to be removed from the case because of nonpayment.

Prosecutors state that instead of repaying creditors and former clients, per a recent court order, Deutch withdrew $241,000 from bank accounts and used that money for personal expenses, meanwhile failing to make the $435,000 repayment to the victims of her alleged fraud.

On August 7, 2015, the Office of Attorney General announced a settlement of the civil and criminal actions against Deutch. Per the terms of the settlement, the state of California withdrew its criminal contempt of court charges and dismissed its civil lawsuit. In exchange, Deutch agreed to pay a fine of $2.5 million and perform 350 hours of volunteer work.

== Disbarment ==
On July 27, 2017 Deutch was disbarred by the California State Bar in a default proceeding.
