= Back taxes =

Taxes not completely paid when due

Back taxes are taxes that were not completely paid when due. Typically, these are taxes that are owed from a previous year. Causes for back taxes include failure to pay taxes by the deadline, failure to correctly report one's income, or neglecting to file a tax return altogether.

A government might implement different approaches to collect back taxes, including criminal charges, offering a voluntary disclosure program that allows a broad variety of payment methods, or tax liens.

If the taxes remain unpaid, the tax authority could use a tax levy to legally seize the taxpayer's assets (such as bank accounts, investment accounts, automobiles, and real estate) to collect the money it is owed.

== United States ==
In the United States, unpaid taxes can be owed at federal, state, and/or local government levels, so are assessed by them. Paying the full amount of tax debt as soon as possible is always the least expensive option for the taxpayer because of penalties and interest accumulation. In 2016, the Internal Revenue Service (IRS) began a new private collection program of certain overdue federal tax debts. The new program authorized designated contractors to collect, on the government's behalf, outstanding inactive tax receivables. By an offer in compromise, taxpayers lacking the means to repay taxes may negotiate a lesser settlement with the IRS.

The consequences for not paying one's back taxes differ. The IRS may send written notices regarding back taxes, and usually expects a response in 30–60 days. A penalty fee is issued if the taxes remain unpaid. The minimum penalty fee is $135. Also, one has to pay interest on the unpaid taxes. The interest rate is usually determined by the federal short-term rate.

The IRS can summon taxpayers, which is a legal requirement for the taxpayer to visit an IRS officer and bring appropriate records and documents. A third party with relevant information about the case, such as a record keeper from a financial institution, can also be summoned by the IRS. If one has a right to tax refunds, the IRS will not hand the refund to the taxpayer until he or she has repaid the back taxes. Other, more severe consequences are losing ground on one's credit report, having one's property seized, declaring bankruptcy, and serving jail time.
