= Tax lien =

Lien imposed on property by law to secure payment of taxes

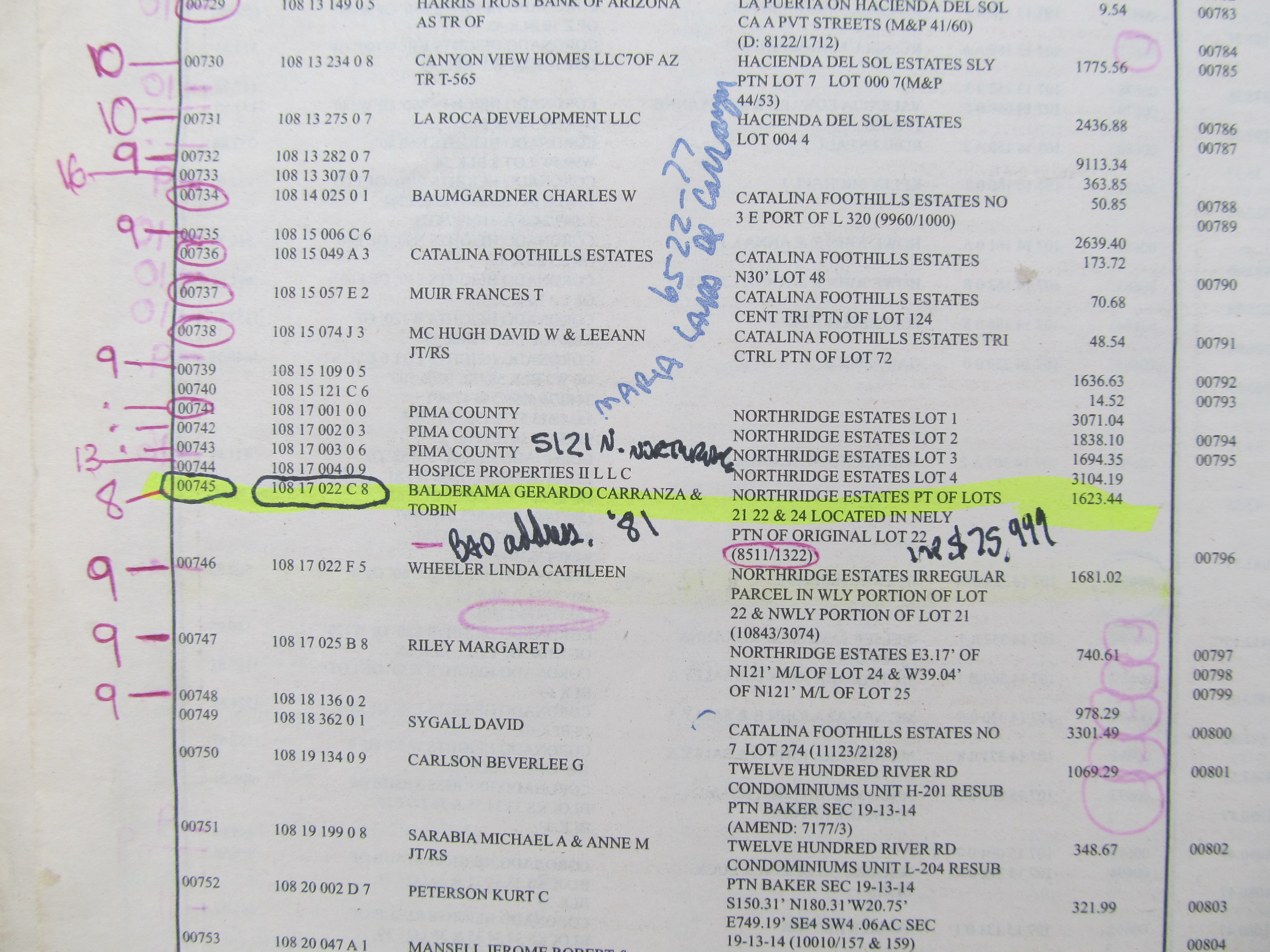
Pima County, Arizona delinquent property tax list for auction by the County Treasurer

A tax lien is a lien which is imposed upon a property by law in order to secure the payment of taxes. A tax lien may be imposed for the purpose of collecting delinquent taxes which are owed on real property or personal property, or it may be imposed as a result of a failure to pay income taxes or it may be imposed as a result of a failure to pay other taxes.

== Federal tax lien in the United States ==
In the United States, a federal tax lien may arise in relation to any kind of federal tax, including but not limited to income tax, gift tax, or estate tax.

=== Federal tax lien basics ===
Internal Revenue Code section 6321 provides:

Sec. 6321. LIEN FOR TAXES.

If any person liable to pay any tax neglects or refuses to pay the same after demand, the amount (including any interest, additional amount, addition to tax, or assessable penalty, together with any costs that may accrue in addition thereto) shall be a lien in favor of the United States upon all property and rights to property, whether real or personal, belonging to such person.

Internal Revenue Code section 6322 provides:

Sec. 6322. PERIOD OF Tax Lien

Unless another date is specifically fixed by law, the lien imposed by section 6321 shall arise at the time the assessment is made and shall continue until the liability for the amount so assessed (or a judgment against the taxpayer arising out of such liability) is satisfied or becomes unenforceable by reason of lapse of time.

The term "assessment" refers to the statutory assessment made by the Internal Revenue Service (IRS) under 26 U.S.C. § 6201 (that is, the formal recording of the tax in the official books and records at the office of the Secretary of the U.S. Department of the Treasury). Generally, the "person liable to pay any tax" described in section 6321 must pay the tax within ten days of the written notice and demand. If the taxpayer fails to pay the tax within the ten-day period, the tax lien arises automatically (i.e., by operation of law), and is effective retroactively to (i.e., arises at) the date of the assessment, even though the ten-day period necessarily expires after the assessment date.

Under the doctrine of Glass City Bank v. United States, the tax lien applies not only to property and rights to property owned by the taxpayer at the time of the assessment but also to after-acquired property (i.e., to any property owned by the taxpayer during the life of the lien).

The statute of limitations under which a federal tax lien may become "unenforceable because of lapse of time" is found at 26 U.S.C. § 6502. For taxes assessed on or after November 6, 1990, the lien generally becomes unenforceable ten years after the date of assessment. For taxes assessed on or before November 5, 1990, a prior version of section 6502 provides for a limitation period of six years after the date of assessment. Various exceptions may extend the time periods.

=== Perfection of federal tax liens against third parties (the Notice of Federal Tax Lien) ===
A federal tax lien arising by law as described above is valid against the taxpayer without any further action by the government.

The general rule is that where two or more creditors have competing liens against the same property, the creditor whose lien was perfected at the earlier time takes priority over the creditor whose lien was perfected at a later time (there are exceptions to this rule). Thus, if the government (which is treated as a "creditor" with respect to unpaid taxes) properly files a Notice of Federal Tax Lien (NFTL) before another creditor can perfect its own lien, the tax lien will often take priority over the other lien.

To "perfect" the tax lien (to create a priority right) against persons other than the taxpayer (such as competing creditors), the government generally must file the NFTL in the records of the county or state where the property is located, with the rules varying from state to state. At the time the notice is filed, public notice is deemed to have been given to the third parties (especially the taxpayer's other creditors, etc.) that the Internal Revenue Service has a claim against all property owned by the taxpayer as of the assessment date (which is generally prior to the date the NFTL is filed), and to all property acquired by the taxpayer after the assessment date (as noted above, the lien attaches to all of a taxpayer's property such as homes, land and vehicles and to all of a taxpayer's rights to property such as promissory notes or accounts receivable). Although the federal tax lien is effective against the taxpayer on the assessment date, the priority right against third party creditors arises at a later time: the date the NFTL is filed. The form and content of the notice of federal tax lien is governed only by federal law, regardless of any requirements of state or local law.

The NFTL is merely a device which gives notice to interested parties of the existence of the federal tax lien. Thus, the NFTL's function is to perfect and obtain priority for the federal tax lien. The filing or refiling of the NFTL has no effect on the expiration date of collection statute of limitations provided in [Internal Revenue Code] §6502. Accordingly, even if the NFTL is refiled, if no event extends the collection statute of limitations, the IRS cannot take any further administrative collection action. Conversely, the IRS's failure to refile the NFTL does not affect the existence of an otherwise valid underlying federal tax lien, i.e., the underlying lien remains valid but loses its priority.

=== Subsequent liens taking priority over previously filed federal tax liens ===
In certain cases, the lien of another creditor (or the interest of an owner) may take priority over a federal tax lien even if the NFTL was filed before the other creditor's lien was perfected (or before the owner's interest was acquired). Some examples include the liens of certain purchasers of securities, liens on certain motor vehicles, and the interest held by a retail purchaser of certain personal property.

Federal law also allows a state—if the state legislature so elects by statute—to enjoy a higher priority than the federal tax lien with respect to certain state tax liens on property where the related tax is based on the value of that property. For example, the lien based on the annual real estate property tax in Texas takes priority over the federal tax lien, even where an NFTL for the federal lien was recorded prior to the time the Texas tax lien arose, and even though no notice of the Texas tax lien is required to be filed or recorded at all.

=== Certificate of release of federal tax lien ===
In order to have the record of a lien released a taxpayer must obtain a Certificate of Release of Federal Tax Lien. Generally, the IRS will not issue a certificate of release of lien until the tax has either been paid in full or the IRS no longer has a legal interest in collecting the tax. The IRS has standardized procedures for lien releases, discharges and subordination. In situations that qualify for the removal of a lien, the IRS will generally remove the lien within 30 days and the taxpayer may receive a copy of the Certificate of Release of Federal Tax Lien. The current form of the Notice of Federal Tax Lien utilized by the IRS contains a provision that provides that the NFTL is released by its own terms at the conclusion of the statute of limitations period described above provided that the NFTL has not been refiled by the date indicated on the form. The effect of this provision is that the NFTL operates as a Certificate of Release of Federal Tax Lien on the day after the date indicated in the form by its own terms.

=== The difference between a federal tax lien and an administrative levy ===
The creation of a tax lien, and the subsequent issuance of a Notice of Federal Tax Lien, should not be confused with the issuance of a Notice of Intent to Levy under 26 U.S.C. § 6331(d), or with the actual act of levy under 26 U.S.C. § 6331(a). The term "levy" in this narrow technical sense denotes an administrative action by the Internal Revenue Service (i.e., without going to court) to seize property to satisfy a tax liability. The levy "includes the power of distraint and seizure by any means. The general rule is that no court permission is required for the IRS to execute a section 6331 levy.

In other words, the federal tax lien is the government's statutory right that encumbers property to secure the ultimate payment of a tax. The notice of levy is an IRS notice that the IRS intends to seize property in the near future. The levy is the actual act of seizure of the property.

In general, a Notice of Intent to Levy must be issued by the IRS at least thirty days prior to the actual levy. Thus, while a Notice of Federal Tax Lien generally is issued after the tax lien arises, a Notice of Intent to Levy (sometimes misleadingly called simply a "notice of levy") generally must be issued before the actual levy is made.

Also, while the federal tax lien applies to all property and rights to property of the taxpayer, the power to levy is subject to certain restrictions. That is, certain property covered by the lien may be exempt from an administrative levy (property covered by the lien that is exempt from administrative levy may, however, be taken by the IRS if the IRS obtains a court judgment).

A detailed discussion of the administrative levy, and the related Notice, is beyond the scope of this article.

In connection with federal taxes in the United States, the term "levy" also has a separate, more general sense of "imposed." That is, when a tax law is enacted by the Congress, the tax is said to be "imposed" or "levied."

=== The effect of an offer in compromise on the tax lien ===
A properly submitted offer in compromise does not affect a tax lien, which remains effective until the offer is accepted and the offered amount is fully paid. Once the compromised amount is paid, the taxpayer should request removal of the lien.

== County level tax liens in the United States ==
In the United States, a tax lien may be placed on a house or any other real property on which property tax is due (such as an empty tract of land, a boat dock, or even a parking place).

Each county has varying rules and regulations regarding what tax is due, and when it is due. The related forms may be tax lien certificates or tax deed certificates.

=== Tax lien certificates ===
Tax lien certificates are issued immediately upon the failure of the property owner to pay. These forms describe a lien on the property. The liens are generally in first position over every other encumbrance on the property, including liens secured by loans against the property.

Tax lien states are Alabama, Arizona, Colorado, Florida, Illinois, Indiana, Iowa, Kentucky, Louisiana, Maryland, Massachusetts, Mississippi, Missouri, Montana, Nebraska, Nevada, New Jersey, New York, Ohio, Rhode Island, South Carolina, Vermont, West Virginia, and Wyoming. The District of Columbia is also a tax lien jurisdiction.

=== Tax deeds ===
Tax deeds are issued after the owner of the property has failed to pay the taxes. Tax deeds are issued in connection with auctions in which the property is sold outright. The starting bid is often only for the back taxes owed, although the situation may vary from one county to another.

Tax deed states are Alaska, Arkansas, California, Connecticut, Delaware, Florida, Georgia, Hawaii, Idaho, Kansas, Maine, Michigan, Missouri, Nevada, New Hampshire, New Mexico, New York, North Carolina, North Dakota, Ohio, Oklahoma, Oregon, Pennsylvania, Rhode Island, South Dakota, Tennessee, Texas, Utah, Virginia, Washington and Wisconsin."Tax Deed States 2024".

=== Tax lien investing ===
Tax liens and tax deeds can be purchased by an individual investor.

In the case of tax liens, interest can be earned. If the property is redeemed then the investor would recover invested money, plus interest due after the lien was purchased. If the property is not redeemed, the deed holder or lien holder has first position to own the property after any other taxes or fees are due.
