= Tax levy =

Administrative action

A tax levy under United States federal law is an administrative action by the Internal Revenue Service (IRS) under statutory authority, generally without going to court, to seize property to satisfy a tax liability. The levy "includes the power of distraint and seizure by any means". The general rule is that no court permission is required for the IRS to execute a tax levy.

While the government relies mainly on voluntary payment of tax, it retains the power of levy to collect involuntarily from those who persistently refuse to pay. The IRS can levy upon wages, bank accounts, social security payments, accounts receivables, insurance proceeds, real property, and, in some cases, a personal residence. Under Internal Revenue Code section 6331, the Internal Revenue Service can "levy upon all property and rights to property" of a taxpayer who owes Federal tax. The IRS can levy upon assets that are in the possession of the taxpayer, called a seizure, or it can levy upon assets in the possession of a third party, a bank, a brokerage house, etc. All future statutory references will be to the Internal Revenue Code unless noted otherwise.

== Procedural requirements ==
According to the U.S. Supreme Court, the power of administrative levy for federal taxes dates back to the year 1791. The Fifth Amendment of the Constitution forbids the government (whether state or federal) from taking an individual's property without due process of law. This rule applies to an IRS levy. To comply with the U.S. Constitution, the IRS must provide the taxpayer notice of the coming levy and an opportunity to be heard. Under §6330(a)(2), the IRS must send to the taxpayer a notice by either personal hand delivery, or through certified mail, or left at the taxpayer's usual place of business. The notice must arrive at least thirty days prior to the levy taking place.

However, if the taxpayer is planning to depart from the United States, or conceal himself or herself; planning to place his or her property beyond the reach of a commissioner by concealing it, by dissipating it, or by transferring it to other persons; or financially imperiled, under 26 U.S.C. § 6331(a), the IRS may determine the collection of the tax is in jeopardy and may immediately make a levy after serving notice and demand for payment of the tax. In such cases, notice of the jeopardy levy need not be served upon the taxpayer until after the levy has already been served on the levy source such as the taxpayer's bank.

The "Notice of Intent to Levy" must include "in simple and nontechnical terms the right of a person to request a hearing during the 30 day period" before the levy will be effective. This hearing is referred to in IRS correspondence as the "collection due process" or CDP hearing. The notice will include the IRS Form 12153 which the taxpayer can fill out and mail in to request a hearing. A taxpayer is entitled to one CDP hearing for each tax period (tax year) to which the levy applies.

The hearing must be held before a neutral, impartial hearing officer "who has had no prior experience with the respect to the unpaid tax…" At the hearing the taxpayer may raise challenges to the collection actions, may seek innocent spouse relief, and may present alternative collection actions such as installment agreements or an offer in compromise. Under certain limited circumstances the tax debtor may challenge the underlying tax liability.

Taxpayers unhappy with the decision at the CDP hearing may contest the decision by filing a petition with the United States Tax Court within 30 days of the adverse determination.

== Post procedural matters ==
If none of the above procedures effectively stops the levy, the IRS can proceed to take the property of the taxpayer. The IRS can levy on most items of property, subject to limits imposed under section 6334. The list of property exempt from levy is short, and may not apply to some taxpayers. Once the IRS has the "green light" to levy, it can then demand that the taxpayer's employer send a portion of the taxpayer's wages to the IRS. The IRS can order a bank at which the taxpayer holds an account to send the proceeds in the bank account to the IRS. Upon being given notice of levy, the bank must preserve that property until it is turned over to the IRS or run the risk of paying the depositor's tax bill pursuant to 26 U.S.C. § 6332(d)(1). Social security proceeds and state and federal tax refunds can be levied easily.

== Levy upon a personal residence ==
Under §6334(e) a levy is allowed on principal residences under certain circumstances. In order to take a principal residence, the IRS must go to court and seek the permission of a federal magistrate to levy a house in which the taxpayer lives. However, under no circumstances can the IRS levy on a personal residence if the total amount owed is equal to or less than $5000.

== Garnishment of wages ==
The IRS can demand of an employer that a portion of the wages of a tax debtor be sent directly to the IRS. Section 6334 does allow for an exempt amount that must remain outside of the levy. That amount is relatively small, sometimes leaving delinquent taxpayers with hardly enough to satisfy their regular living expenses.

A levy in the form of garnishment upon wages is considered to be a continuous levy, i.e. it needs to be applied only once and will be applicable to future wages until either released by the IRS under §6343 or the debt is fully paid. So as future wages are earned, no additional levy action is necessary by the IRS to take a large portion from them. Distinguish this from a bank account levy. Once the money in the bank account has been sent by the bank to the IRS, any future deposits can only be reached with additional levy action by the IRS.

Section 6343(a)(1)(d) of the Internal Revenue Code and Treasury Regulation section 301.6343-1(b)(4) afford a debtor the opportunity to keep more of his or her money if the garnishment would create an economic hardship.

Firing an employee to avoid handling a levy may be a criminal offense. Federal law provides for a fine of up to $1,000 and imprisonment for up to one year on an employer who willfully fires an employee in connection with a garnishment of the employee's earnings.

== Effect of an offer in compromise on an IRS levy ==
Under federal tax regulations, "[t]he IRS will not levy against the property or rights to property of a taxpayer who submits an offer to compromise, to collect the liability that is the subject of the offer, during the period the offer is pending, for 30 days immediately following the rejection of the offer, and for any period when a timely filed appeal from the rejection is being considered by Appeals."

Once the IRS decides that an offer is processable and that the offer includes all the paperwork and forms properly filled out, the IRS must stop levy actions under §6331. If the offer is missing documents or forms, however, the IRS can return the paperwork to the debtor as un-processable, and can then levy or garnish her property.

== Effect of a request for innocent spouse relief on an IRS levy ==
Internal Revenue Code section 6015(e)(1)(B) prohibits the IRS from levying taxpayers who have a pending claim for innocent spouse relief.

== See also ==
Taxation in the United States
