= Yosef Eliyahu Deutch =

Israeli rabbi and philanthropist

Yosef Eliyahu Deutch (Hebrew: יוסף אליהו דויטש) was a Jerusalem rabbi and philanthropist. He was born in Jerusalem in 1922 and died there in 1983. He was the son of Lelov hasid and Jerusalemite Rabbi Matisyahu Deutch, author of "Divrei Matisyahu".

Deutch headed the "Anshei Mamad" Yeshiva for Halacha and Kabbala in Jerusalem which is currently headed by his son Rabbi Shneur Deutch. Deutch's soup kitchens and other charitable institutions named "Chasdei Yosef" are headed by his son Rabbi Moshe Deutch. His eldest son Rabbi Chaim Shalom Deutch is a prominent Chabad hasid.
