= Transportation Infrastructure Finance and Innovation Act =

Transportation Infrastructure Finance and Innovation Act of 1998
- Long title: Title I Subtitle E of the Transportation Equity Act for the 21st Century
- Acronyms (colloquial): TIFIA
- Enacted by: the 105th United States Congress

Citations
- Public law: Pub. L. 105–178 (text) (PDF)

Legislative history
- Introduced in the House of Representatives by Bud Shuster (R–PA) on September 4, 1997; Signed into law by President Bill Clinton on Jun 9, 1998

The Transportation Infrastructure Finance and Innovation Act (TIFIA) is a U.S. federal government program run through the U.S. Department of Transportation to provide credit assistance for qualified regional and national surface transportation projects in the United States. Projects include highways, city passenger railways, some freight rail, intermodal freight transfer facilities, and some port terminal projects.

The program was reauthorized in the FAST Act, passed by the 114th U.S. Congress in 2015. In 2021, the program added a streamlined application called TIFIA Lite, which reduced barriers to strong credit borrowers by using a standardized loan process. According to the Build America Bureau, TIFIA Lite projects can be approved up to six months earlier than typical TIFIA applicants, allowing smaller projects to get off the ground faster.

== History ==
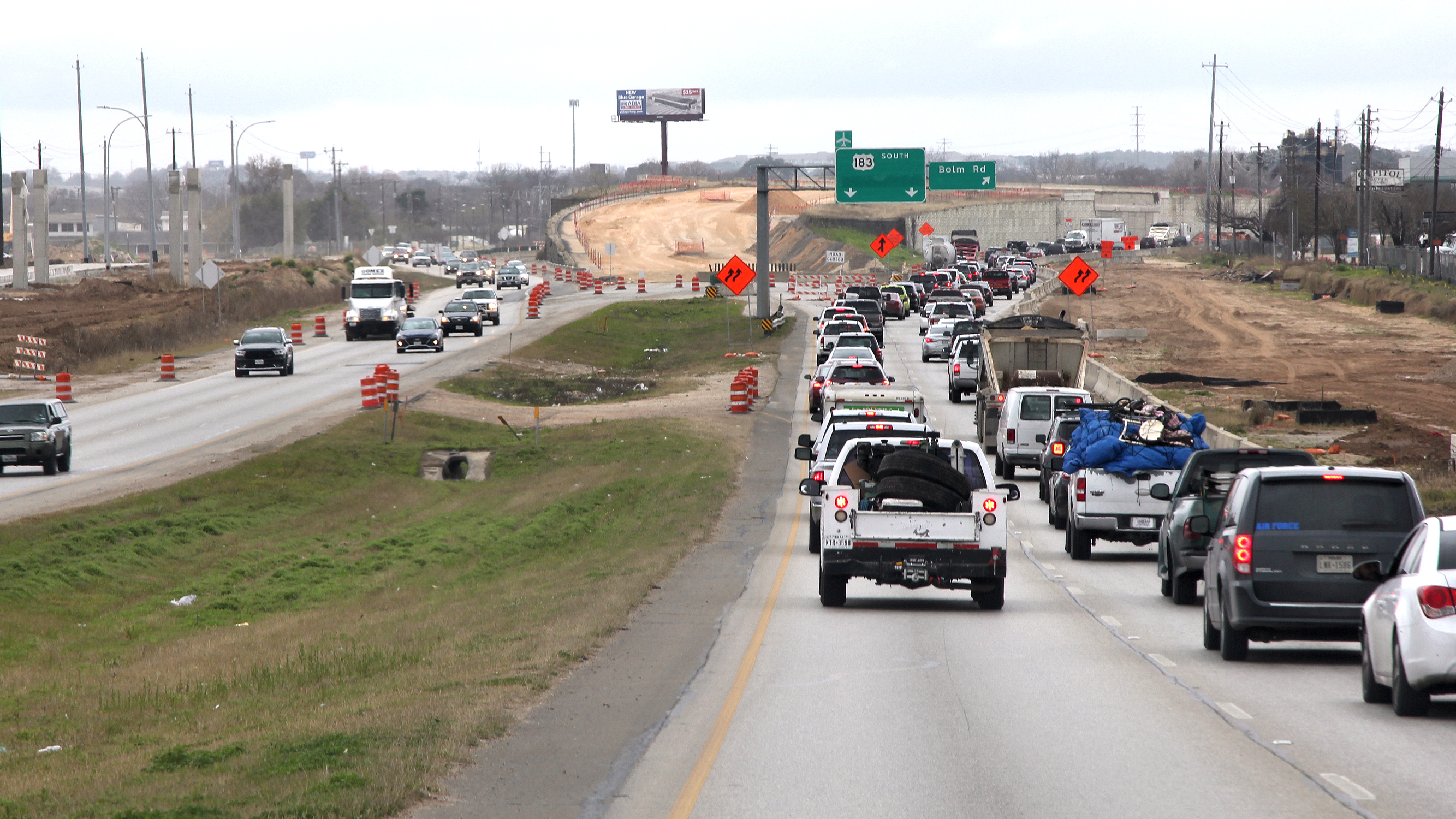
US Route 183 has received $106.71 million in TIFIA assistance.

TIFIA was passed by Congress in 1998 as part of the Transportation Equity Act for the 21st Century (TEA-21, P.L. 105–78), with the goal to leverage federal dollars and attract private and non-federal capital into transportation infrastructure. This funded start-up projects aiming to improve highway and transit infrastructure, as well as inner city bus and passenger rail vehicles. To appeal to lenders, the projects allowed sculpted and subordinate repayment terms. TIFIA would also allow several flexible repayment options. Since its passage, TIFIA has initiated loans from various sources, including more established, highly rated lenders. This trend, coupled with short-term reinvestment rates at record lows, has allowed borrowers to limit their capital market debt.

Congress has also taken part in expanding TIFIA throughout the years. In 1999, Congress allowed a budget of $80 million under the TEA-21 Authorization Act. As of the 2022 fiscal year, the Infrastructure Investment and Jobs Act (IIJA) has taken effect, setting this budget to $250 million. In addition to an increased budget, TIFIA's project eligibility has also extended to State Infrastructure Banks (SIB), most airport projects, and additional transit-oriented development.

The Build America Bureau has managed the program since 2015, maintaining a greater role in its oversight due to more recent transportation reauthorization bills expanding project eligibility. Through 98 projects from the act's passage to the 2022 fiscal year, TIFIA has aided in the commitment of $37.3 billion in loans. These loan contributions went towards a total of $132.2 billion in expenditures.

== How it works ==
The TIFIA (Transportation Infrastructure Finance and Innovation Act) program aims to provide credit support for major transportation projects. It is run by the U.S. Department of Transportation's (DOT) Office of Innovative Program Delivery. The program provides "loans, loan guarantees, and lines of credit to qualified public or private borrowers, including state governments, private firms, special authorities, local governments, transportation improvement districts, or a consortium of these entities, such as public‐private partnerships."

Projects must be greater than $50 million to qualify and can range from a variety of things like highways, bridges, railroads, and transit. Those eligible to apply are state and local governments, transit agencies, railroad companies, as well as private entities. The program offers:

- A 35-year fixed-rate loan for up to 33 percent of the cost of the project
- Non-variable interest rates
- Deferral payment options of up to five years after completion of the project
- Ongoing debt service

Some benefits of TIFIA include:

- TIFIA's fixed interest rates can often be more affordable than other private market rates.
- TIFIA offers deferred payments meaning companies can generate revenue from their projects before repaying debts.
- TIFIA offers a variety of assistance (direct loans, loan guarantees, and lines of credit).
- TIFIA's loan is backed by the full faith and credit of the federal government, making it a secure loan.

== Cost ==
Federal authorizations for TIFIA from 2016 to 2020 are:

Fiscal year	Authorization
2016	$275,000,000
2017	$275,000,000
2018	$285,000,000
2019	$300,000,000
2020	$300,000,000

Records for authorized funding from 2021 onwards have not yet been publicly released.

== Influence ==
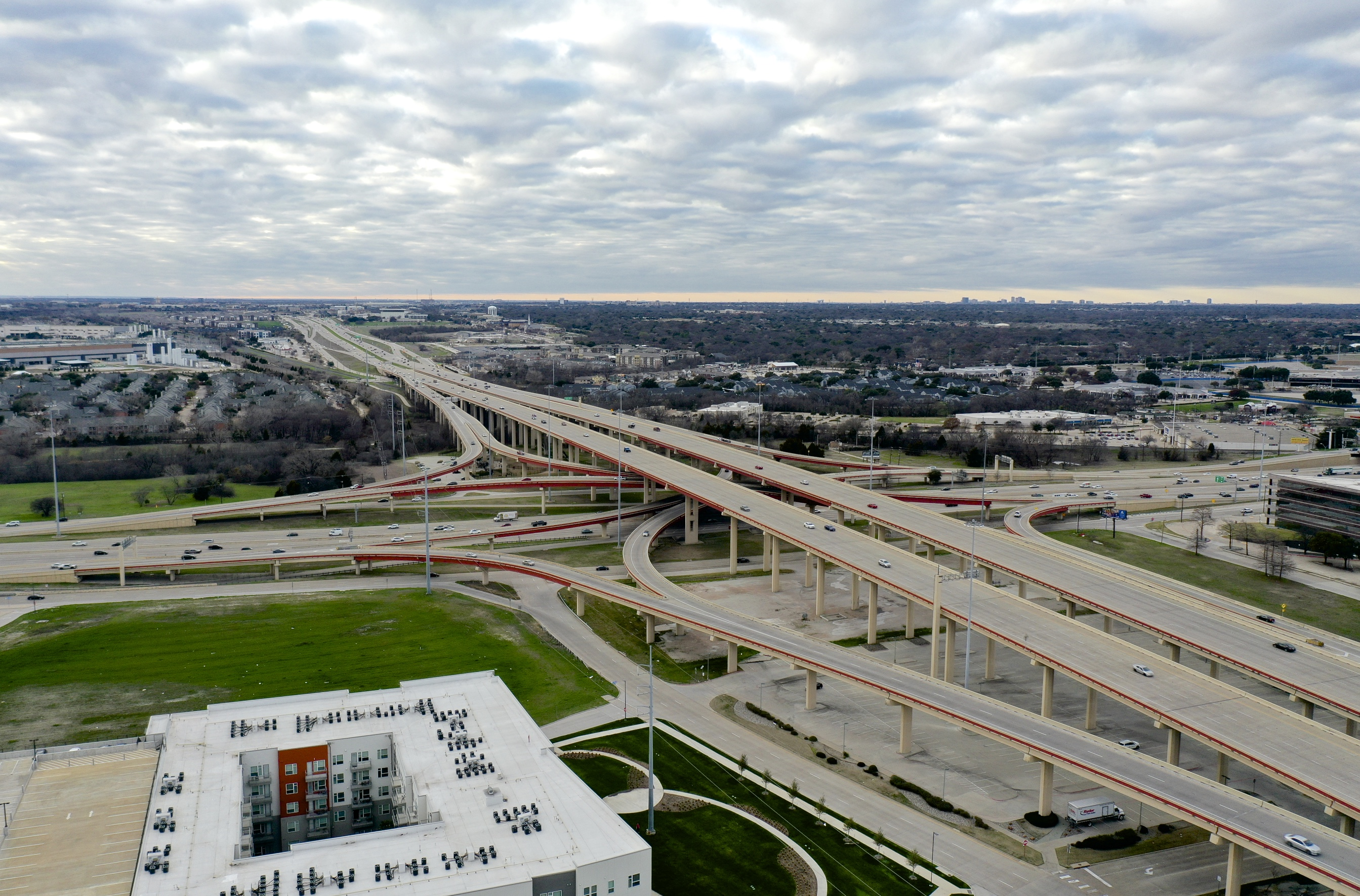
President George Bush Turnpike, in Dallas, Texas, was funded in part by TIFIA.

The TIFIA has served as a model for other types of development projects. For example, in 2016, North America's Building Trades Unions (NABTU) publicly called President Obama to adopt a major infrastructure investment program. NABTU has also recommended an increase in investments in nuclear power and the implementation of an Energy Infrastructure Finance and Innovation program based on the Transportation Infrastructure Finance and Innovation Act.

Congress has also used the TIFIA program as a model for other initiatives. A notable example is the Water Infrastructure Finance and Innovation Act (WIFIA) program, administered by the Environmental Protection Agency and the Army Corps of Engineers. Additionally, the first TIFIA-funded project supporting Transit-Oriented Development was approved in 2024.
