= Offer in compromise =

The Offer in Compromise (OIC) program, in the United States, is an Internal Revenue Service (IRS) program under 26 U.S.C. § 7122, which allows qualified individuals with an unpaid tax debt to negotiate a settled amount that is less than the total owed to clear the debt. A taxpayer uses the checklist in the Form 656, OIC package to determine if the taxpayer is eligible for the program. The objective of the OIC program is to accept a compromise when acceptance is in the best interests of both the taxpayer and the government, and promotes voluntary compliance with all future payment and filing requirements.

== Qualifying conditions ==
At least one of three conditions must be met to qualify a taxpayer for consideration of an OIC settlement:

- Doubt as to liability — debtor can show reason to doubt that the assessed tax liability is correct
- Doubt as to collectibility — debtor can show that the debt is likely uncollectable in full by the IRS under any circumstances
- Effective tax administration — debtor does not contest liability or collectibility, but can demonstrate extenuating or special circumstances that the collection of the debt would "create an economic hardship or would be unfair and inequitable."

This OIC program is available for any taxpayer, but is primarily used by individuals who are elderly, disabled, or have special extenuating circumstances.

=== Doubt as to liability ===
Taxpayers who file an offer based on a theory as to doubt as to liability (DATL) will need to establish that they have not otherwise had an opportunity to dispute a tax liability. If the IRS can show that the taxpayer received the proper notices of assessment and failed to act on them, or otherwise contested the tax in the context of an audit, the taxpayer will not be able to seek this sort of relief. An OIC based solely on the basis of DATL does not require the submission of financial information.

=== Doubt as to collectibility ===
Doubt as to collectibility (DATC) means that the taxpayer will never be able to fully pay the tax bill. The IRS will consider a settlement based on the following formula:

Settlement amount = (monthly disposable income x a number of months) + the net realizable equity in the taxpayer's assets.

Disposable income is monthly income minus allowable monthly expenses. The IRS will not allow all expenses the taxpayer may actually have. Common disallowed expenses are college-tuition payments for a dependent and credit-card payments (disallowed since they represent unsecured debt).

The number of months over which disposable income must be calculated into the offer amount is based on the smaller of the number of months remaining until the collection statute expiration date for the tax debt or either 6 or 24 months, depending on the payment option for the OIC that the applicant is selecting.

Net realizable equity in assets is the quick-sale value of the asset (often 80% of fair market value) minus any liabilities secured by the asset (e.g., a loan). As an example, if a taxpayer has a home worth $100,000 and owes $50,000 on the home, the IRS will calculate the net realizable equity in the asset as: ($100,000 x .80) - $50,000 = $30,000. The IRS expects, in this example, that the $30,000 will be included in the offer amount.

If a taxpayer believes he or she qualifies, the taxpayer completes a financial statement on a form provided by the IRS. Wage earners and self-employed individuals use Form 433-A. Form 433-B is for offers involving all other business types. These financial statements identify all assets and liabilities, as well as disposable income.

=== Effective tax administration ===
Effective tax administration offers may apply where the taxpayer is ineligible for an offer in compromise based on either a theory of DATL or DATC. The taxpayer must establish that collecting on the tax liability would cause economic hardship, or in the alternative, "where compelling public policy or equity considerations identified by the taxpayer provide a sufficient basis for accepting less than full payment."

== Eligible liabilities ==
An OIC can be submitted to settle any federal tax liability incurred under the Internal Revenue Code. This includes both business taxes (payroll, income, etc.) and individual taxes (income, trust fund recovery penalties, etc.). It can only settle taxes that have already been assessed. In the United States, income tax is considered assessed on the date the return is due, or if the return is filed after the due date, on the day the return is received. For income taxes in the United States, the due date is usually April 15. If a tax liability has not yet been assessed, it cannot be included in an OIC. Certain taxes, however, are due throughout the year, so are eligible for inclusion.

== Partial payment ==
Effective April 15, 2020, the IRS made changes to the OIC program requiring that an up-front 20%, nonrefundable payment, plus US$205, be submitted along with the OIC in the case of a cash offer.

An offer submitted without the required fees is subject to rejections without appeal. After the IRS receives the offer, the IRS has two years to make a decision. If the decision is not reached by that time, then the offer is automatically accepted.

Under the Tax Increase Prevention and Reconciliation Act of 2005, if a taxpayer chooses to make payments over time, i.e. monthly, the taxpayer must include with the offer the first month's payment. The taxpayer is not required to submit the 20%, which applies only to the lump-sum payment option. Then, during the time that the offer is being considered by the IRS, the taxpayer must keep making the monthly payments to keep the offer current. If the taxpayer fails to make the payments, the offer will be returned to the taxpayer.

In the case of both the application fee and either the 20% down payment or the monthly payments, a low-income taxpayer may be exempt from both. Taxpayers should review Form 656A to determine whether these fees and payments apply to them.

== Effect on levies and liens ==
An OIC will have no effect upon a tax lien. The lien will remain in effect until the offer is accepted by the IRS and the full amount of the offer has been paid in full. Once the offered amount has been paid, the taxpayer should request that the IRS remove the lien.

An OIC will stop tax levies under section 301.7122(g)(1) of the US Federal Tax Regulations. That regulation states that the IRS will not levy upon a taxpayer's property while a valid OIC (an offer that has been accepted for processing) is pending, and if rejected, for 30 days after the rejection. If the taxpayer appeals the rejection, the IRS cannot levy while the appeals process is ongoing. If a levy is in place when the offer is submitted, it is not automatically released.

== Consumer alert ==
In 2004, the IRS issued a consumer alert warning of promoters' claims to settle debts for "pennies on the dollar" through the OIC program. The warning addressed companies charging high fees to consumers who may not be eligible for the program; all other payment means would have to be exhausted, including installment payments. A recommendation is to check with the Better Business Bureau before contracting any firm to resolve tax problems.

In 2014, the IRS did lower the threshold, and that is expected to last for an indefinite period.

== See also ==
- Settlement (litigation)
