= Miami Worldcenter station =

Train station in Miami

Miami Worldcenter
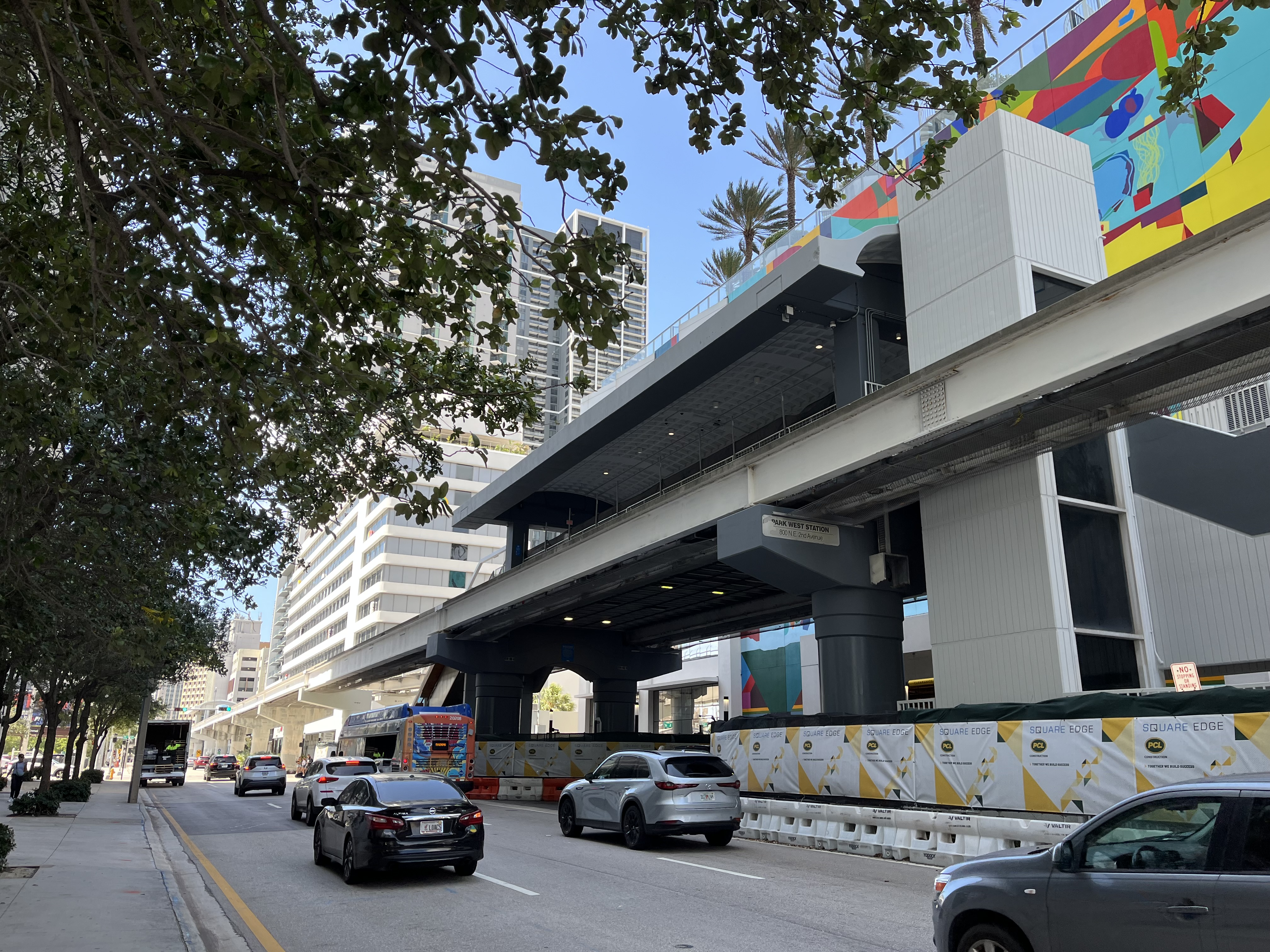

General information
- Location: 800 NE Second Avenue; Miami, Florida 33132
- Coordinates: 25°46′56″N 80°11′26″W
- Owner: Miami-Dade County
- Platforms: 1 island platform
- Tracks: 2
- Connections: Metrobus: 9

Construction
- Accessible: Yes

History
- Opened: May 26, 1994

Services
Preceding station	Miami-Dade Transit	Following station
Freedom Tower toward Downtown	Omni Loop	Eleventh Street toward School Board
Location

Miami Worldcenter (formerly Park West) is a Metromover station in the Park West neighborhood of Downtown, Miami, Florida.

The station is located at the intersection of Northeast Second Avenue and Eighth Street. It opened to service under the name Park West on May 26, 1994, and is two blocks northwest of the Miami-Dade Arena.

On January 6, 2025, the station completely closed for heavy renovation, overhauling platform seating and flooring, entrance escalators and canopies, lighting, and paint. Metromover cars were made to bypass the station and riders were advised to use other stations in the meantime.

Renovations finished and the station reopened in September 2025, and the station's name was renamed Miami Worldcenter after the adjacent mixed-use development of the same name. Commissioner Keon Hardamon stated that the renaming was to honor and identify Miami Worldcenter as a symbol of Downtown's revitalization, and an expected positive force for tourism in Miami.

== Places of interest ==
- Kaseya Center
- Museum Park
- Marinablue
- Ten Museum Park
- Miami Worldcenter
- 900 Biscayne Bay
- One Thousand Museum
