= College Bayside station =

Miami Metromover station

College Bayside
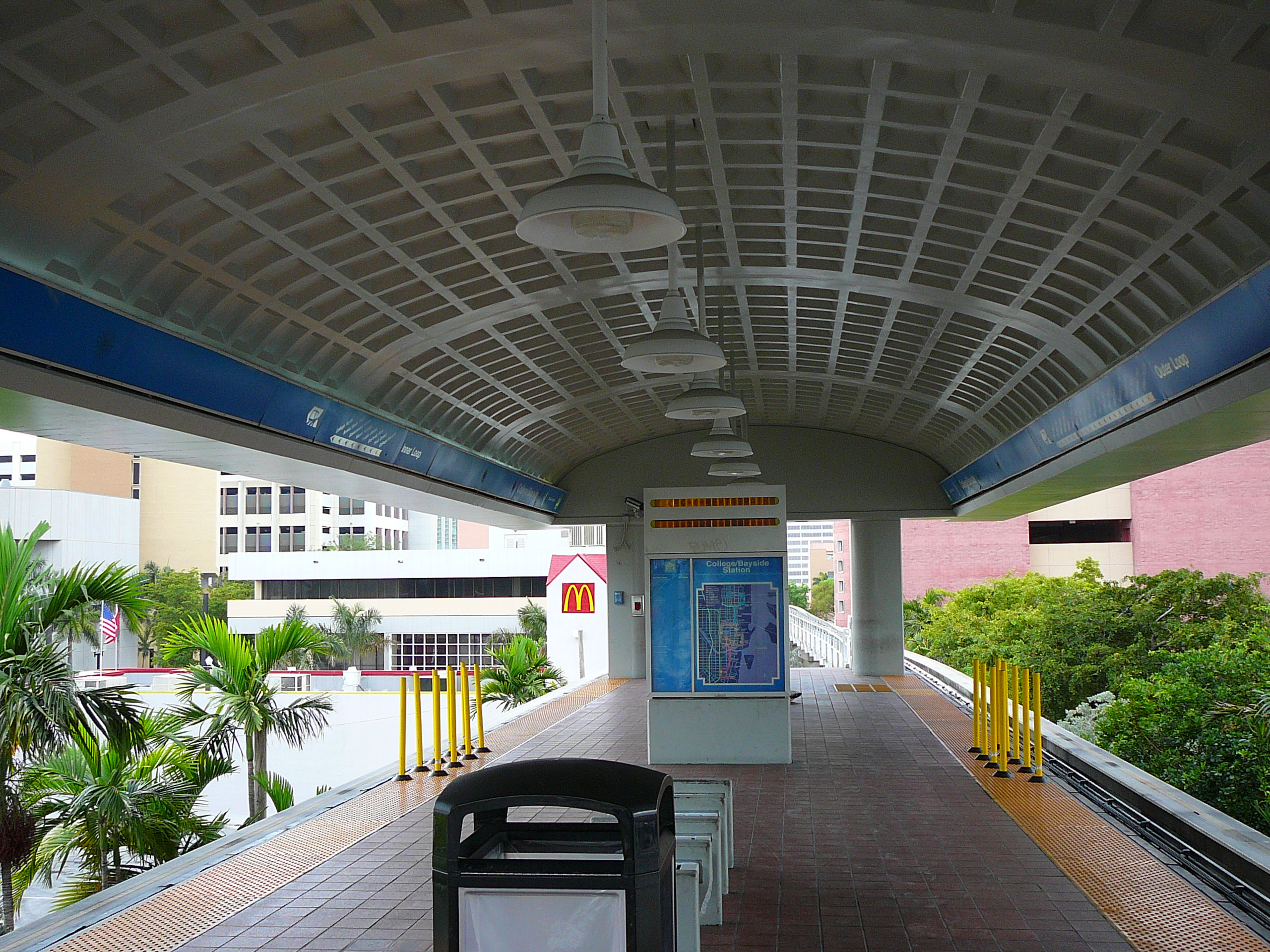
- College Bayside station in 2008

General information
- Location: 225 NE Third Street; Miami, Florida
- Coordinates: 25°46′39″N 80°11′23″W
- Owner: Miami-Dade County
- Platforms: 1 island platform
- Tracks: 2
- Connections: Metrobus: 3, 9, 100, 203

Construction
- Accessible: Yes

History
- Opened: April 17, 1986

Services
Preceding station	Miami-Dade Transit	Following station
First Street One-way operation	Omni Loop	Freedom Tower toward School Board
First Street One-way operation	Brickell Loop	College North toward Financial District
First Street Next clockwise	Inner Loop	College North One-way operation
Location

College Bayside station is a Metromover station in Downtown, Miami, Florida. It is located east of Northeast Second Avenue between Northeast Third Street and Northeast Fourth Street, adjacent to the Wolfson Campus of Miami Dade College and one block west of the Bayside Marketplace. The station on April 17, 1986, as part of the initial segment of the system. It has a single island platform.
