= College North station =

Miami Metromover station

College North
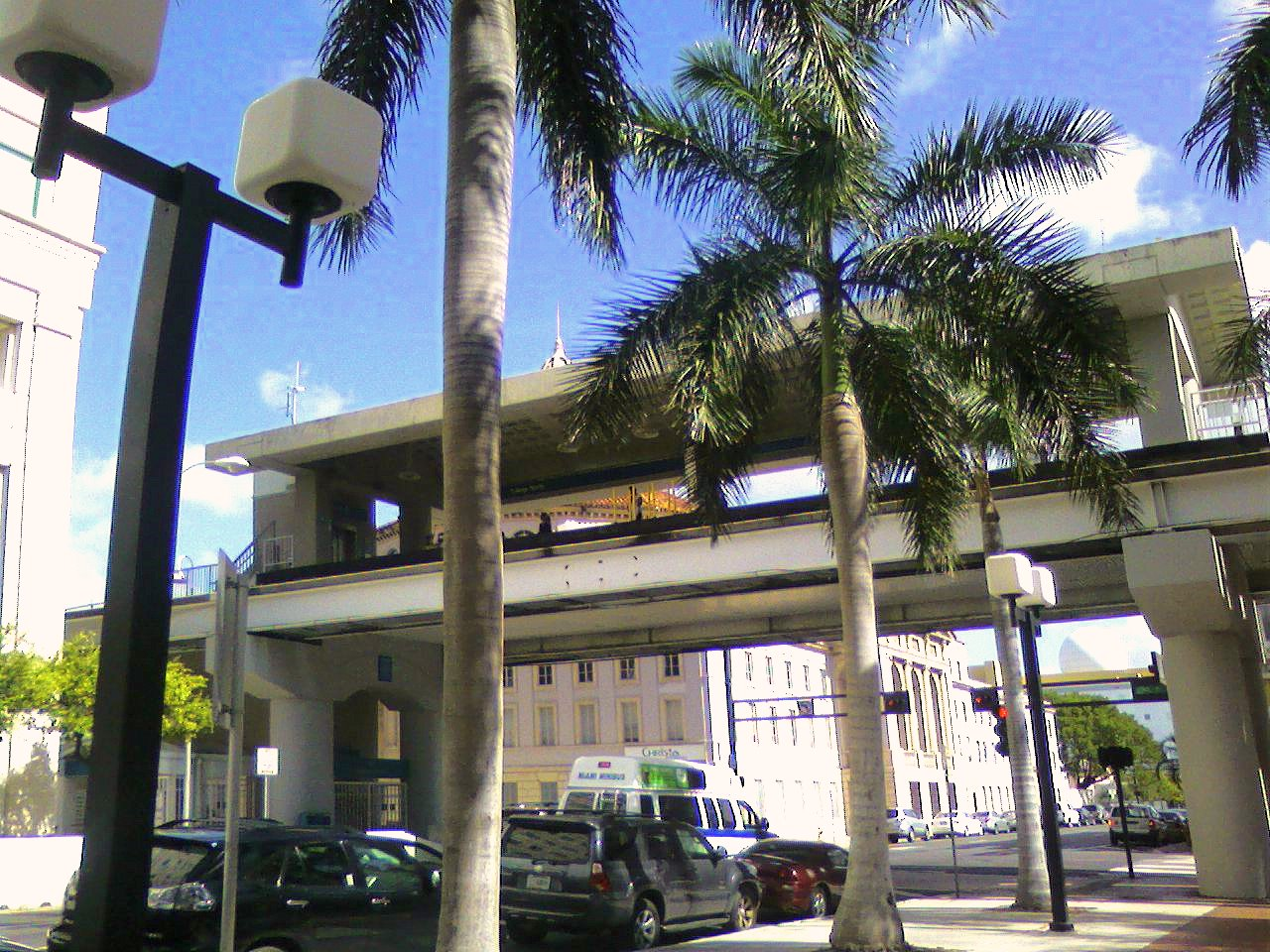

General information
- Location: 100 NE Fifth Street; Miami, Florida 33132
- Coordinates: 25°46′44″N 80°11′31″W
- Owner: Miami-Dade County
- Platforms: 1 island platform
- Tracks: 2
- Connections: Metrobus: 7, 9

Construction
- Accessible: Yes

History
- Opened: April 17, 1986

Services
| Preceding station | Miami-Dade Transit | Following station |
|---|---|---|
| Wilkie D. Ferguson Jr. toward School Board | Omni Loop | Freedom Tower One-way operation |
| Wilkie D. Ferguson Jr. toward Financial District | Brickell Loop | College Bayside One-way operation |
| Wilkie D. Ferguson Jr. One-way operation | Inner Loop | College Bayside Next clockwise |
Location

College North is a Metromover station in Downtown, Miami, Florida.

This station is located on Northeast Fifth Street and First Avenue, opening to service April 17, 1986.

== Places of interest ==
- Central Baptist Church
- First United Methodist Church
- Miami Dade College (Wolfson Campus)
- 501 First Avenue Building
- 521 First Avenue Building
- 541 First Avenue Building
- 481 First Avenue Building
- Opus Tower
- 500 First Avenue Building
- 550 First Avenue Plaza
