= Freedom Tower station =

Miami Metromover station

Freedom Tower
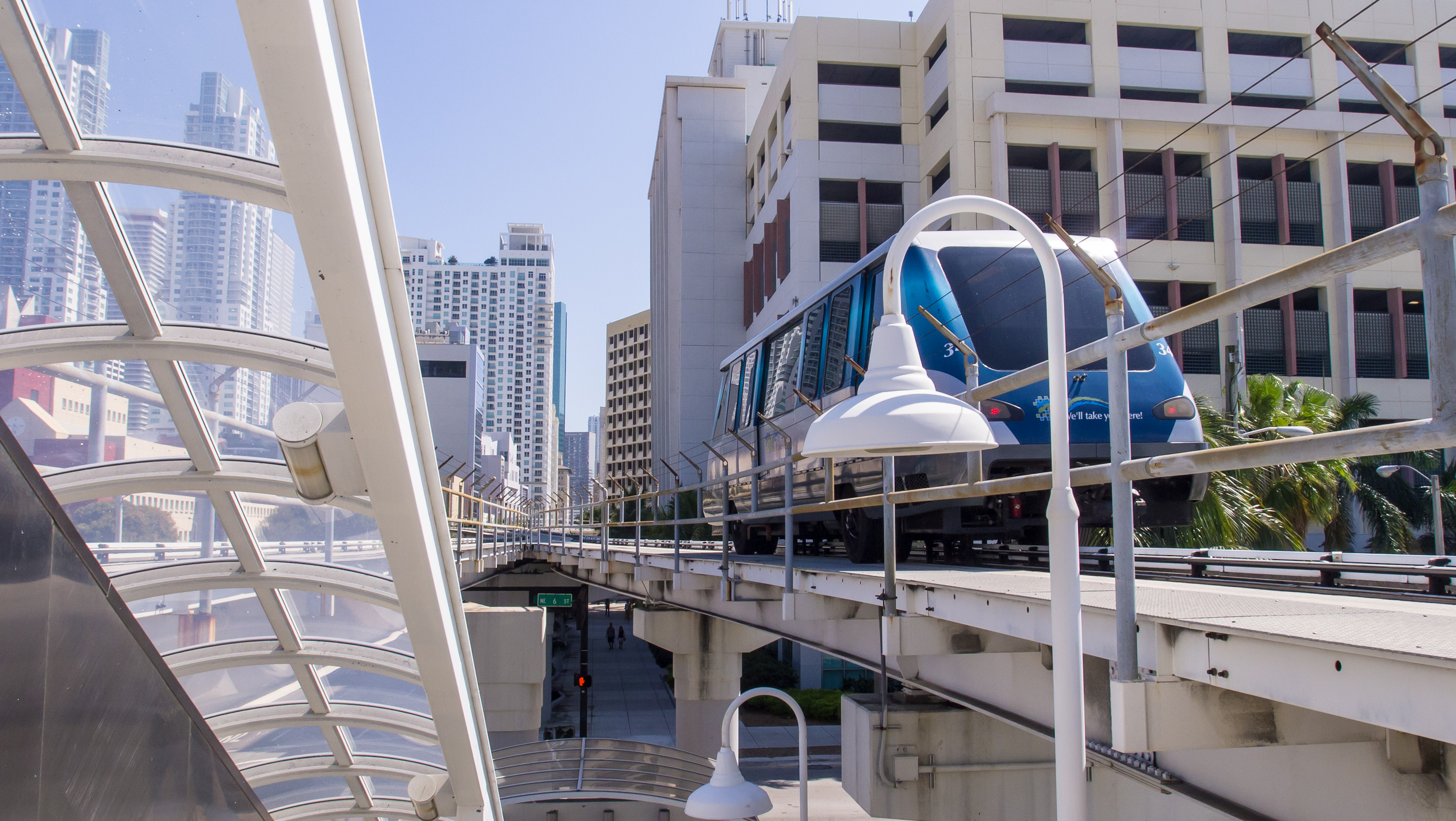
- Government Center-bound train departing the station

General information
- Location: 600 NE Second Avenue; Miami, Florida 33132
- Coordinates: 25°46′49″N 80°11′26″W
- Owner: Miami-Dade County
- Platforms: 1 island platform
- Tracks: 2
- Connections: Metrobus: 9

Construction
- Accessible: Yes

History
- Opened: May 26, 1994

Services
Preceding station	Miami-Dade Transit	Following station
College North toward Downtown	Omni Loop	Miami Worldcenter toward School Board
College Bayside One-way operation	Omni Loop	Miami Worldcenter toward School Board
Location

Freedom Tower is a Metromover station in Downtown, Miami, Florida, directly west of the Freedom Tower and the Miami-Dade Arena.

The station is located at the intersection of Northeast Sixth Street and Second Avenue, opening to service May 26, 1994.

The station closed for renovation in July 2020 and remain closed through 2023. The station will connect into the Miami World Center development.

== Places of interest ==
- Freedom Tower
- Kaseya Center
- Miami Worldcenter
- Miami Dade College (Wolfson Campus)
- Paramount Park Tower
- Freedom Square
