= Wilkie D. Ferguson Jr. station =

Miami Metromover station

Wilkie D. Ferguson Jr.
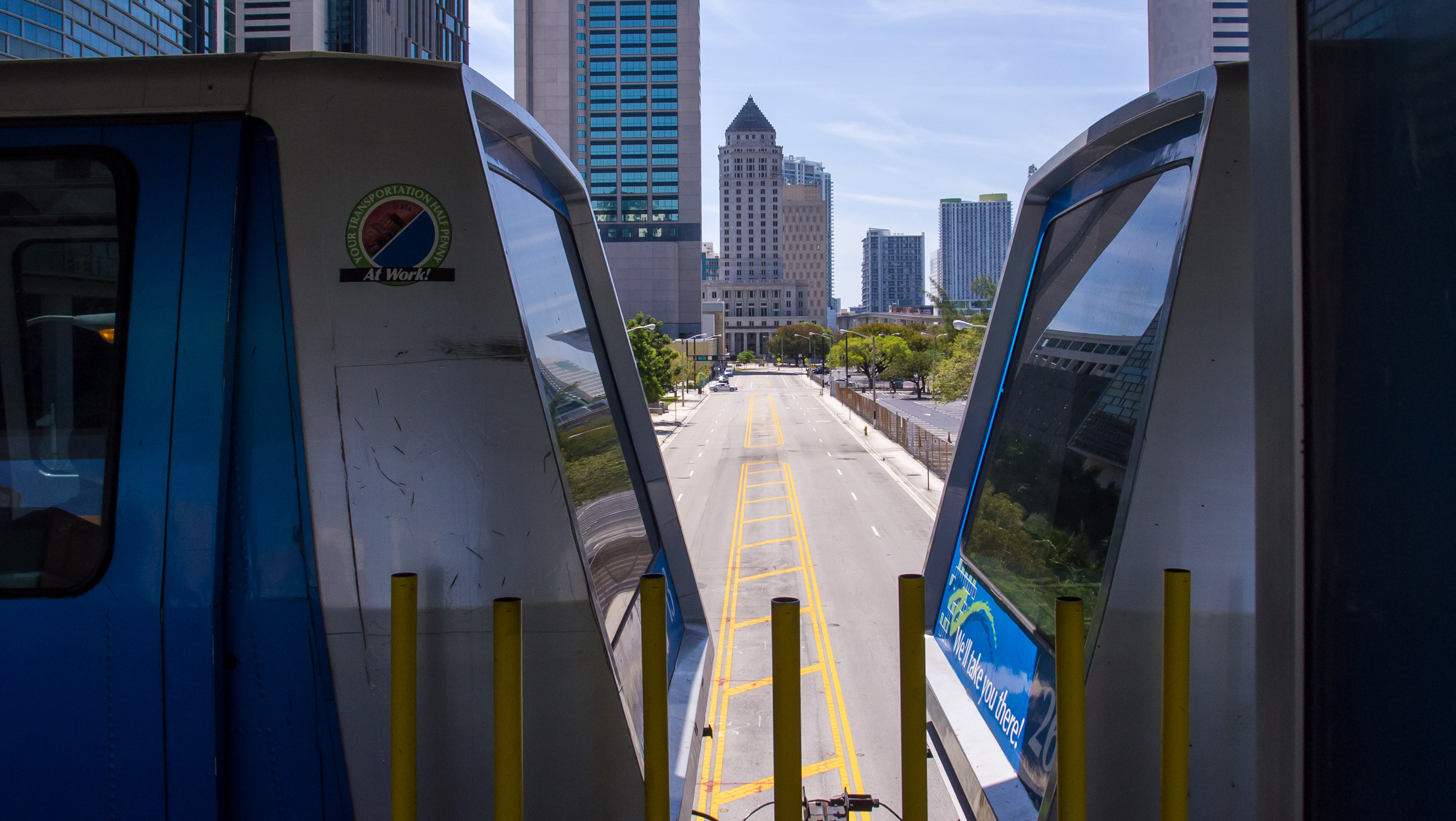
- View between two waiting Metromover cars at the station of Dade County Courthouse and government buildings

General information
- Location: 90 NW Fifth Street; Miami, Florida
- Coordinates: 25°46′43″N 80°11′43″W
- Owner: Miami-Dade County
- Platforms: 1 island platform
- Tracks: 2
- Connections: Brightline (at MiamiCentral); Tri-Rail (at MiamiCentral); Metrobus: 2, 7, 21, 95, 836, 837

Construction
- Accessible: Yes

History
- Opened: April 17, 1986
- Former names: State Plaza (1986–1988); Arena/State Plaza (1988–2012)

Services
Preceding station	Miami-Dade Transit	Following station
Government Center toward School Board	Omni Loop	College North One-way operation
Government Center toward Financial District	Brickell Loop	College North One-way operation
Government Center One-way operation	Inner Loop	College North Next clockwise
Location

Wilkie D. Ferguson Jr. (known as Arena/State Plaza before 2012) is a Metromover station in Downtown, Miami, Florida.

This station is located near the intersection of Northwest Fifth Street and First Avenue. It opened to service on April 17, 1986. This station is within walking distance to MiamiCentral, which serves Tri-Rail and Brightline.

== Places of interest ==
- Wilkie D. Ferguson U.S. District Courthouse
- U.S. Post Office
- Miami Police Department
- MiamiCentral
- City of Miami Office Building
- Florida State Office Buildings
- New Arena Square
- 101 Fifth Street Building
- 121 Fifth Street Building
- 141 Fifth Street Building
- 120 Fifth Street Building
- Crosswinds Office Building
