= Freedom Tower (Miami) =

Building in Miami, Florida, US

- U.S. National Register of Historic Places
- U.S. National Historic Landmark
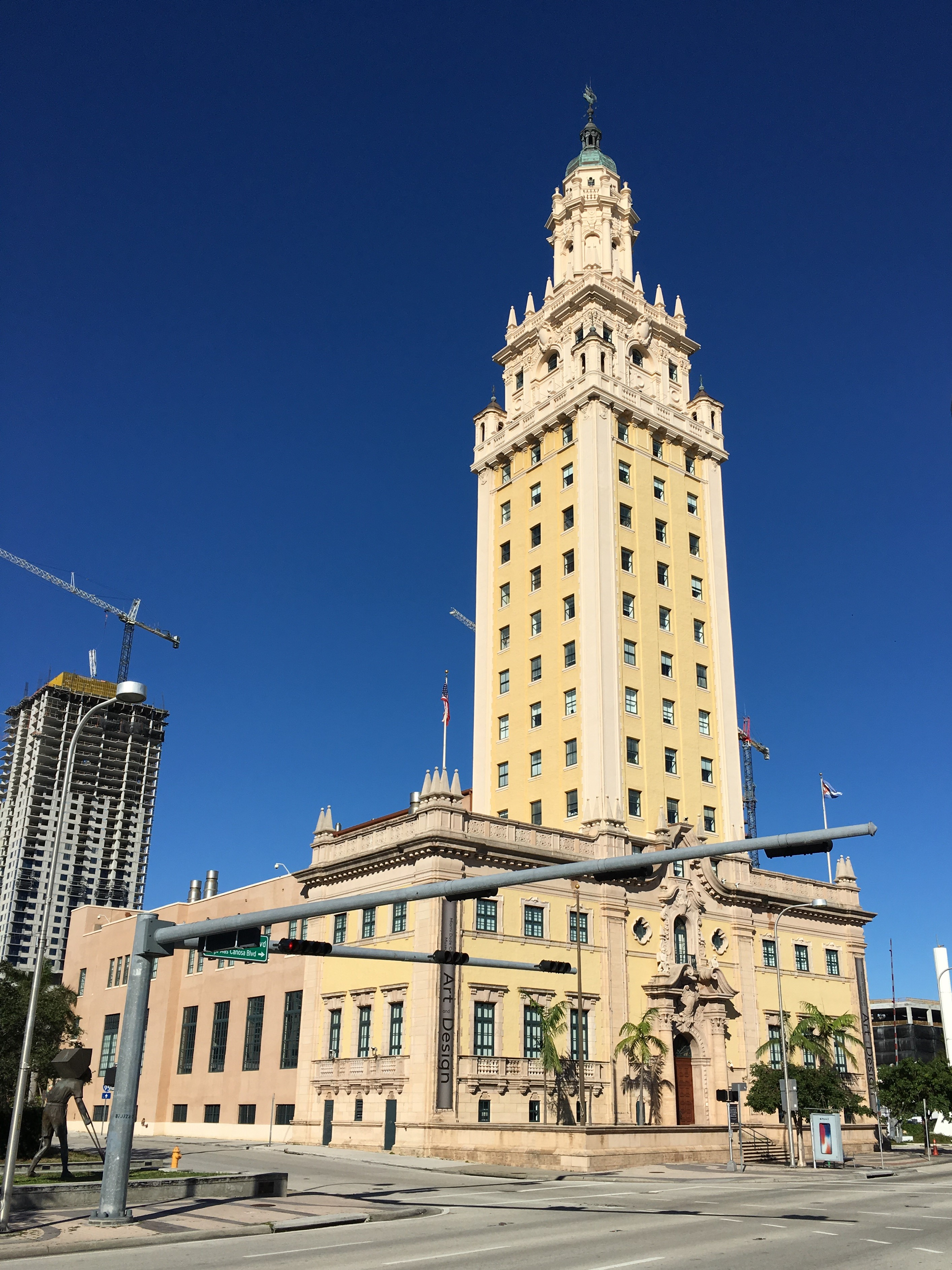
- Freedom Tower in 2017

- Location within Miami Location within Florida Location within the United States
- Location: Miami, Florida, U.S.
- Coordinates: 25°46′48″N 80°11′23″W
- Built: 1925
- Architect: George A. Fuller, Schultze & Weaver
- Architectural style: Spanish Renaissance Revival
- NRHP reference No.: 79000665

Significant dates
- Added to NRHP: September 10, 1979
- Designated NHL: October 6, 2008

The Freedom Tower (Spanish: Torre de la Libertad) is a building in Miami, Florida. It was designed by Schultze and Weaver and is currently used as a contemporary art museum and a central office to different disciplines in the arts associated with Miami Dade College. It is located at 600 Biscayne Boulevard on Miami Dade College's Wolfson Campus.

On September 10, 1979, Freedom Tower was added to the U.S. National Register of Historic Places. On October 6, 2008, it was designated a U.S. National Historic Landmark for its role in hosting Cubans as they fled communist Cuba for Florida following the 1959 Cuban Revolution. On April 18, 2012, the AIA's Florida Chapter placed the building on its list of Florida Architecture: 100 Years. 100 Places as the "Freedom Tower/Formerly Miami News and Metropolis Building".

Freedom Tower is served by the Miami Metrorail at the Government Center Station and the Historic Overtown/Lyric Theatre station, as well as by the Metromover at the Freedom Tower station on the Omni Loop.

== History ==
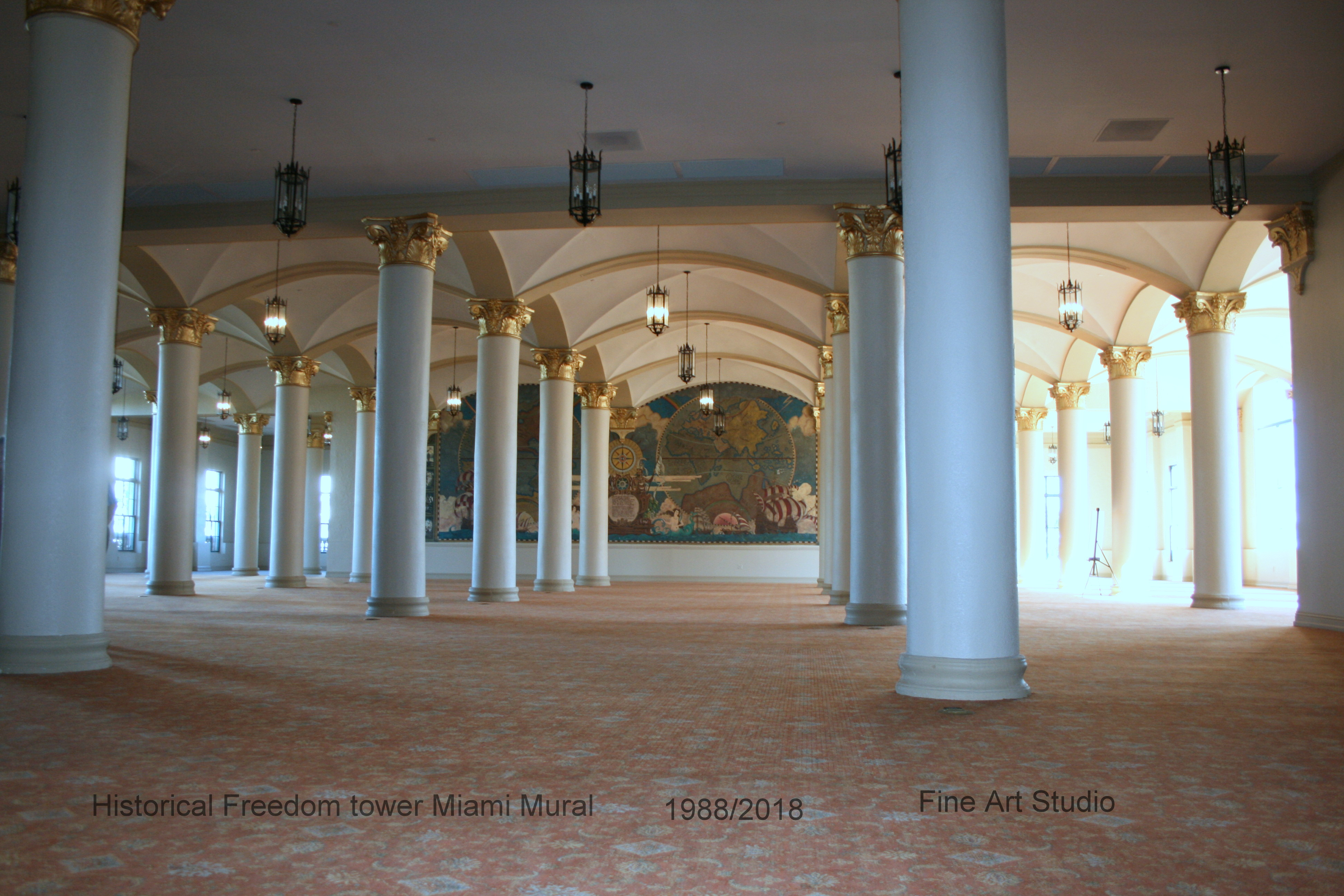
"Freedom Tower Miami New World Mural 1513"

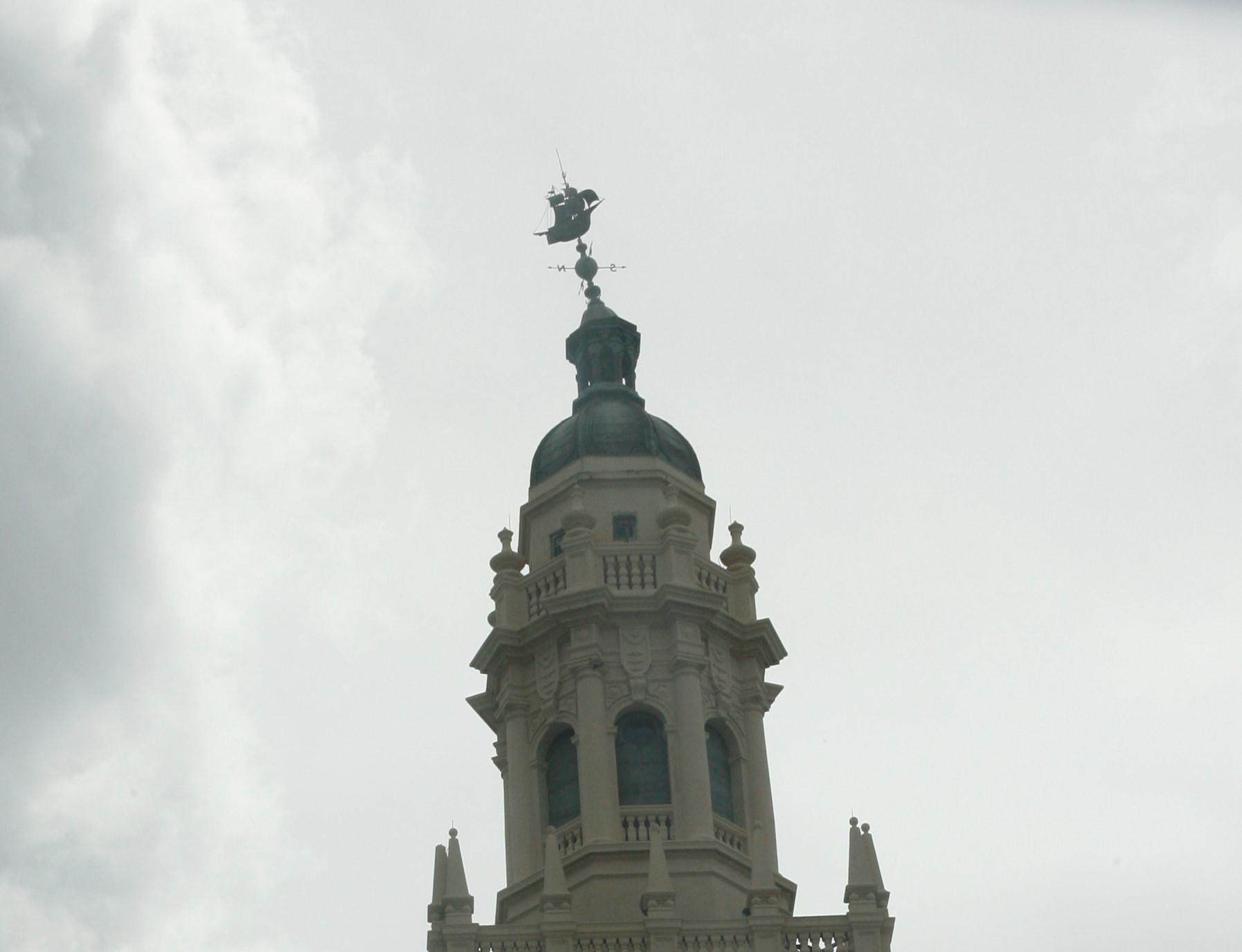
Freedom Tower cupola

In 1925, the building was built as the headquarters and printing facility for the newspaper The Miami News. The building is an example of a Spanish Revival styled structure with design elements borrowed from the Giralda in Seville, Spain. Its cupola on a 255-foot (78 m) tower contained a decorative beacon.

In 1966, The Miami News moved in with the Knight Ridder-owned Miami Herald into a new, state-of-the-art building at One Herald Plaza, sharing production facilities with its morning rival while maintaining a separate editorial staff.

The United States government used the facility in the 1960s to process and document refugees from the Cuban Revolution and to provide medical and dental services for them. After the major era of refugees ended, in 1972, the federal government sold the building to private buyers in 1974. In 1979, the building was listed on the National Register of Historic Places.

The New World Mural 1513 was painted in 1988 by The Miami Artisans: Wade S. Foy, John Conroy, William Mark Coulthard, Phylis Shaw, Gerome Villa Bergsen and Ana Bikic. The mural is situated in the Grand Hall on the second floor, however, it sometimes has limited access for the public. The mural is a recreation of the ruined original from 1926, originally commissioned by the tower's developer James M. Cox in 1926 and again in 1987 by architect Richard Hiessenbottle RA. The center poem is by Edwin Markham, poet laureate for the Lincoln Memorial address.

In 1997, the building was purchased for US$4.1 million by the family of Cuban-American businessman and anti-Communist Jorge Mas Canosa. The Mas family then restored the tower to its original state and converted it into a memorial to the refugees who fled to the United States from Cuba. It housed a museum, library, meeting hall, and the offices of the Cuban American National Foundation. Cuban-American singer Celia Cruz was memorialized at the Freedom Tower upon her death in 2003, with more than 200,000 turning out to show their respects.

In 2005, Terra Group father and son Pedro and David Martin, along with 600 Biscayne LLC and its members purchased the Freedom Tower from the Mas Family. This purchase eventually led to the Freedom Tower being donated to Miami Dade College, under the leadership of Miami-Dade College President Dr. Eduardo Padron. As part of the donation agreement, the College was required to create a Cuban exile experience, and today it is used as a museum, cultural center, and education center.

On April 13, 2015, Cuban-American Florida Senator Marco Rubio chose the Freedom Tower as the venue for the announcement of his presidential campaign, citing the significance of the location as a beacon representing freedom for Cuban-Americans.

On September 17, 2015, King of Spain Felipe VI received the Presidential Medal, the highest distinction from Miami Dade College, from its president, Eduardo Padron.

On May 10, 2022, Governor Ron DeSantis announced a $25 million investment to preserve, refurbish and enhance the Freedom Tower. The proposal will be considered during the upcoming legislative session, and will be included in Governor DeSantis’ legislative budget recommendation.

In July 2023, the Freedom Tower closed for a two year restoration project involving extensive structural and interior repairs alongside a full exterior restoration.

In 2025, President Donald Trump announced plans for the Donald J. Trump Presidential Library to be built adjacent to the Freedom Tower on land owned by Miami Dade College. The Florida executive office gifted the 2.63 acre parcel to the Trump Presidential Library Foundation. The Freedom Tower reopened to the public on September 16, 2025, following a $25 million restoration.

== Gallery ==
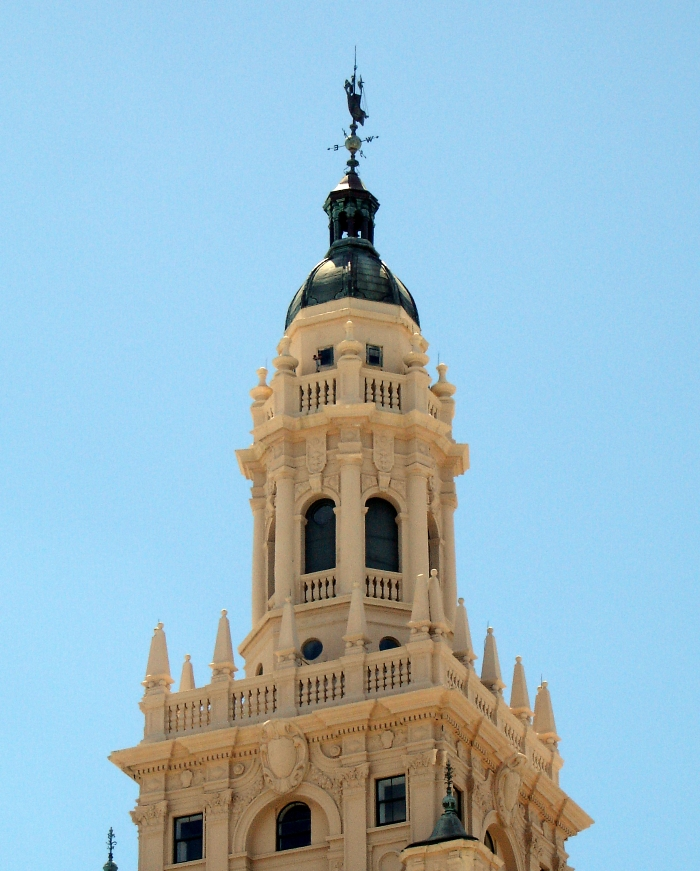
Miami Freedom Tower's cupola

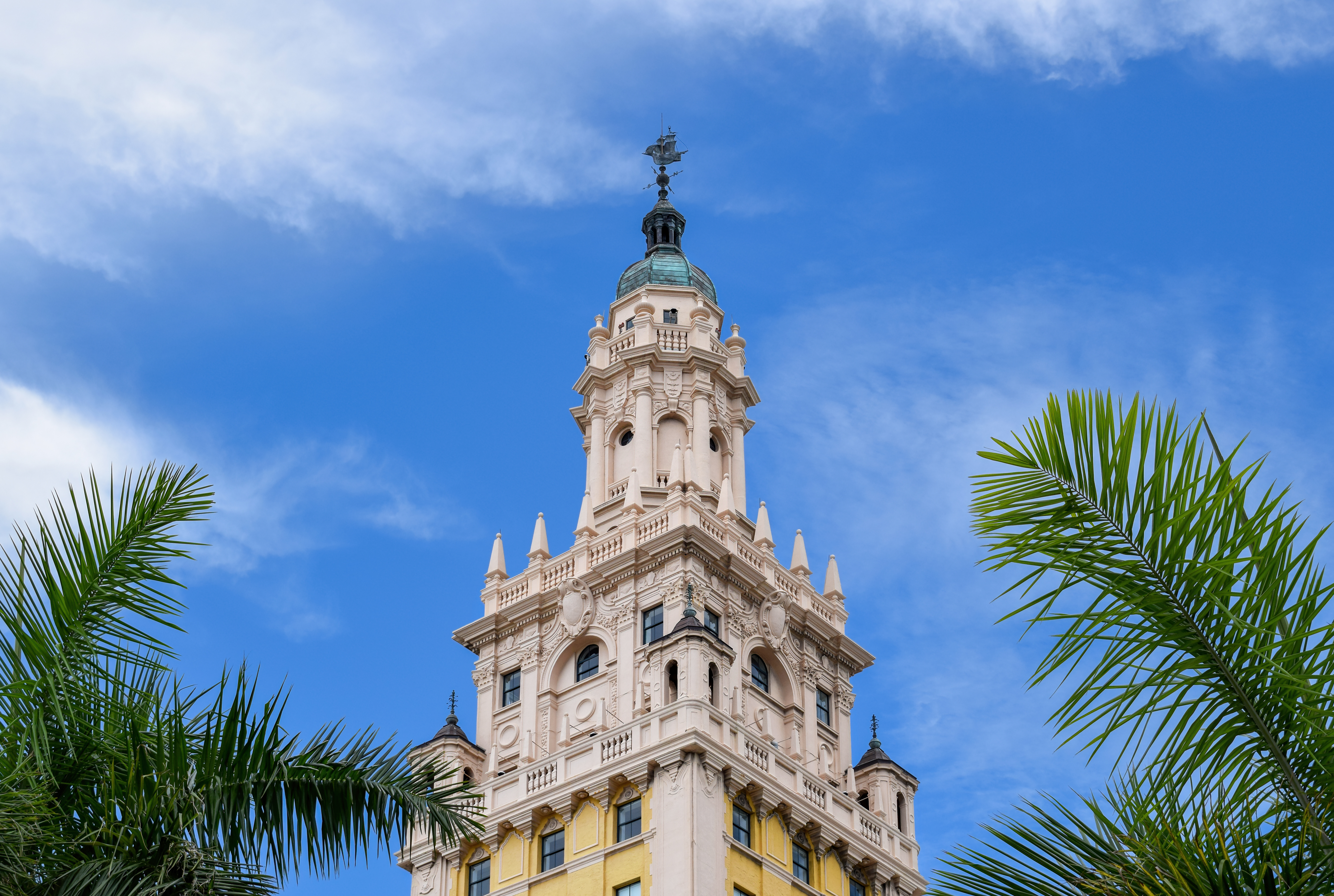
Upper tower section with cupola

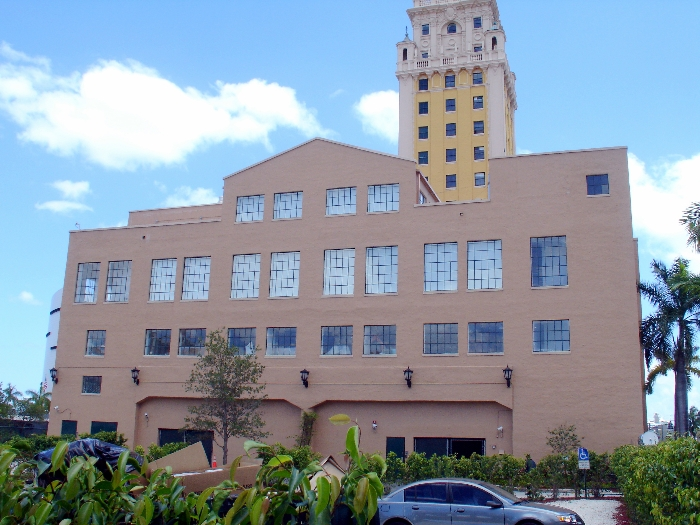
Westside – back side

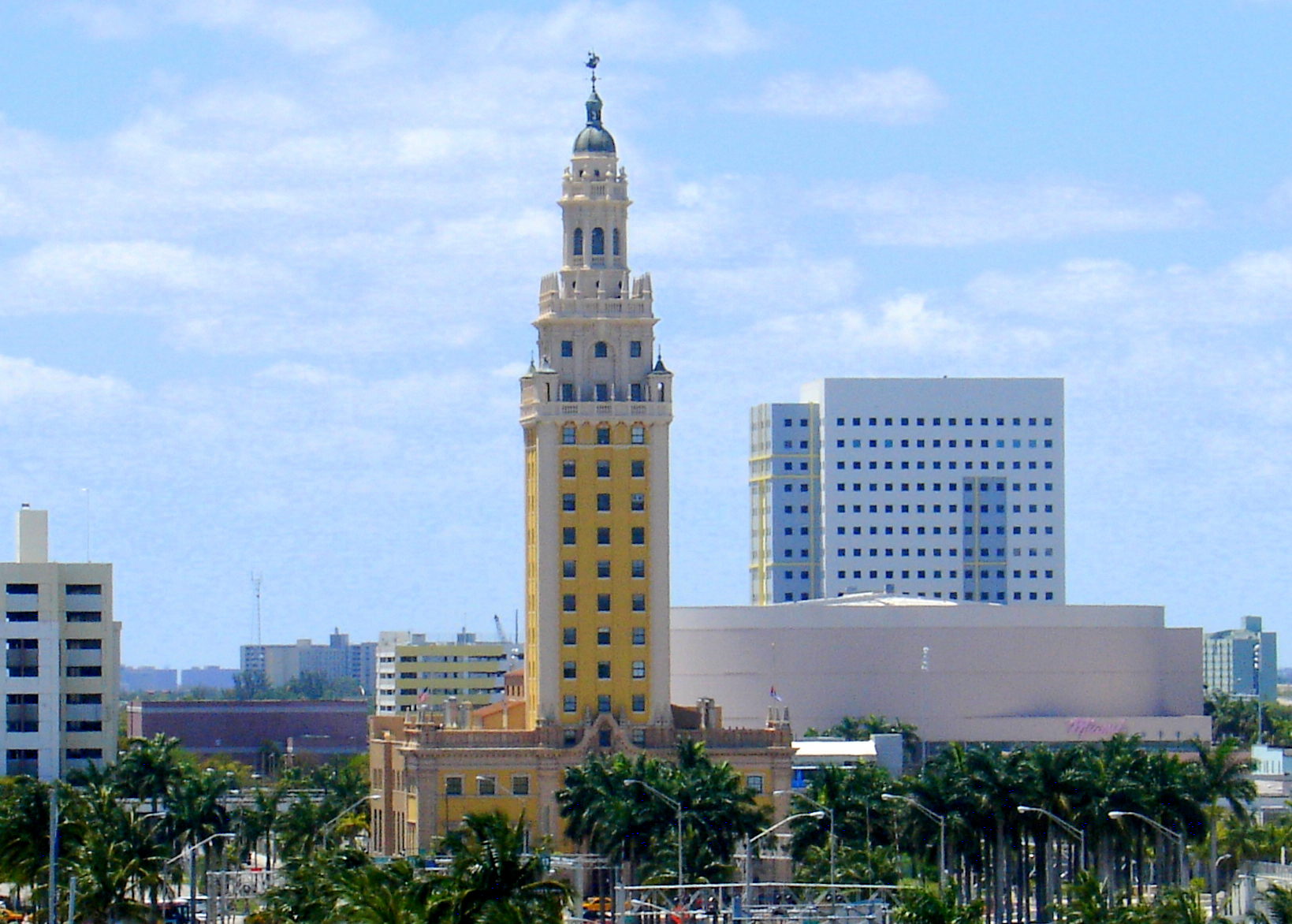
From the Port Bridge looking west, notice Miami Arena in background before demolition in April 2007

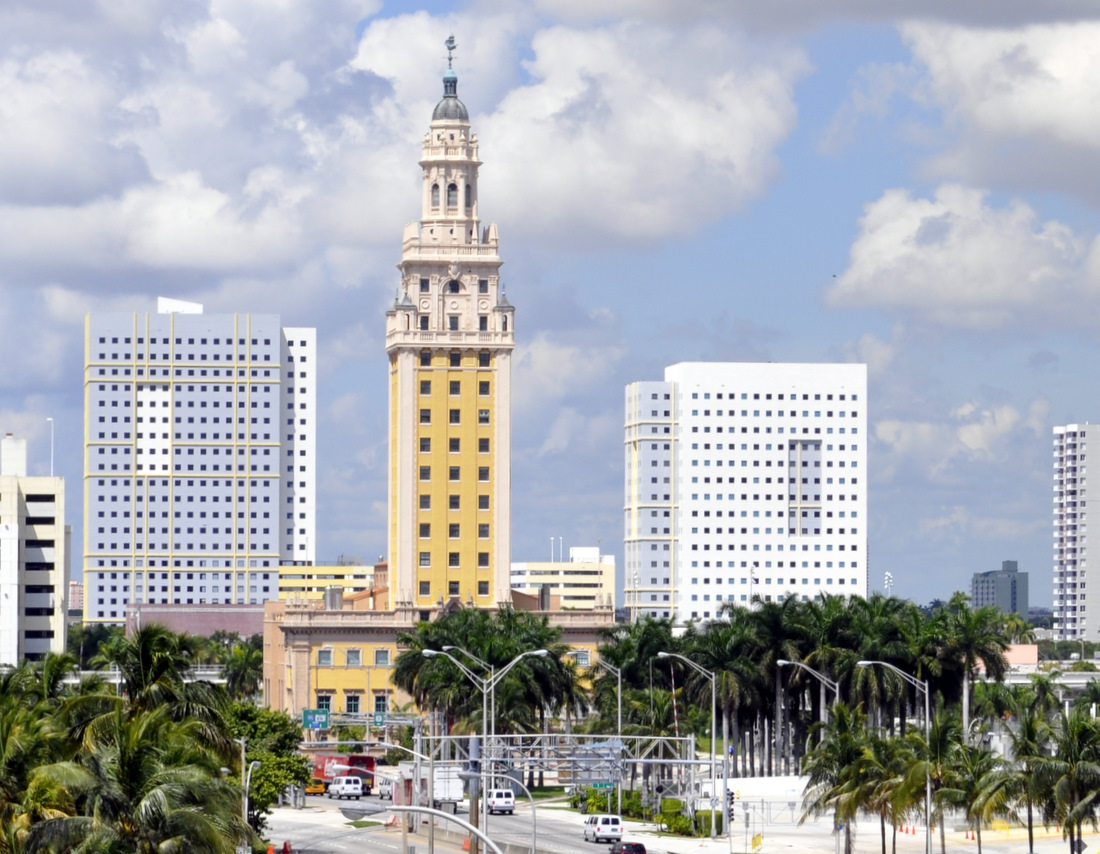
From the Port Bridge looking west

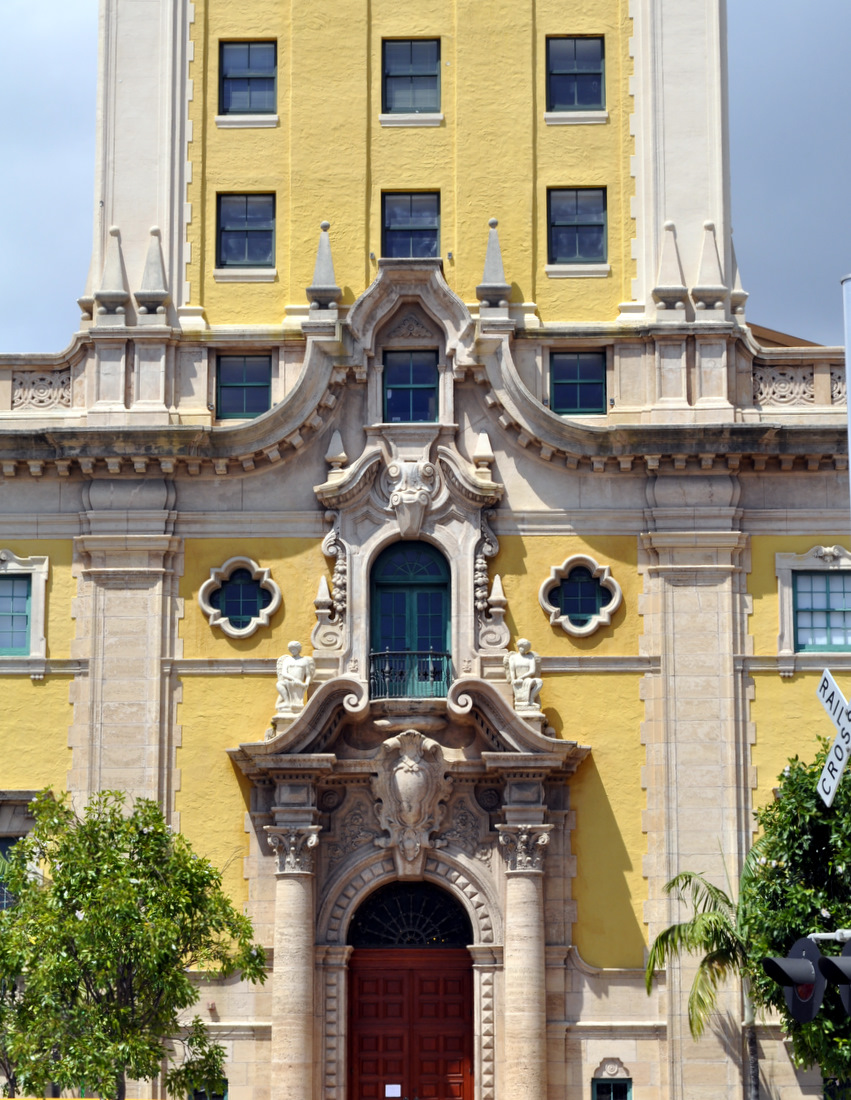
Closeup view of the front in 2010

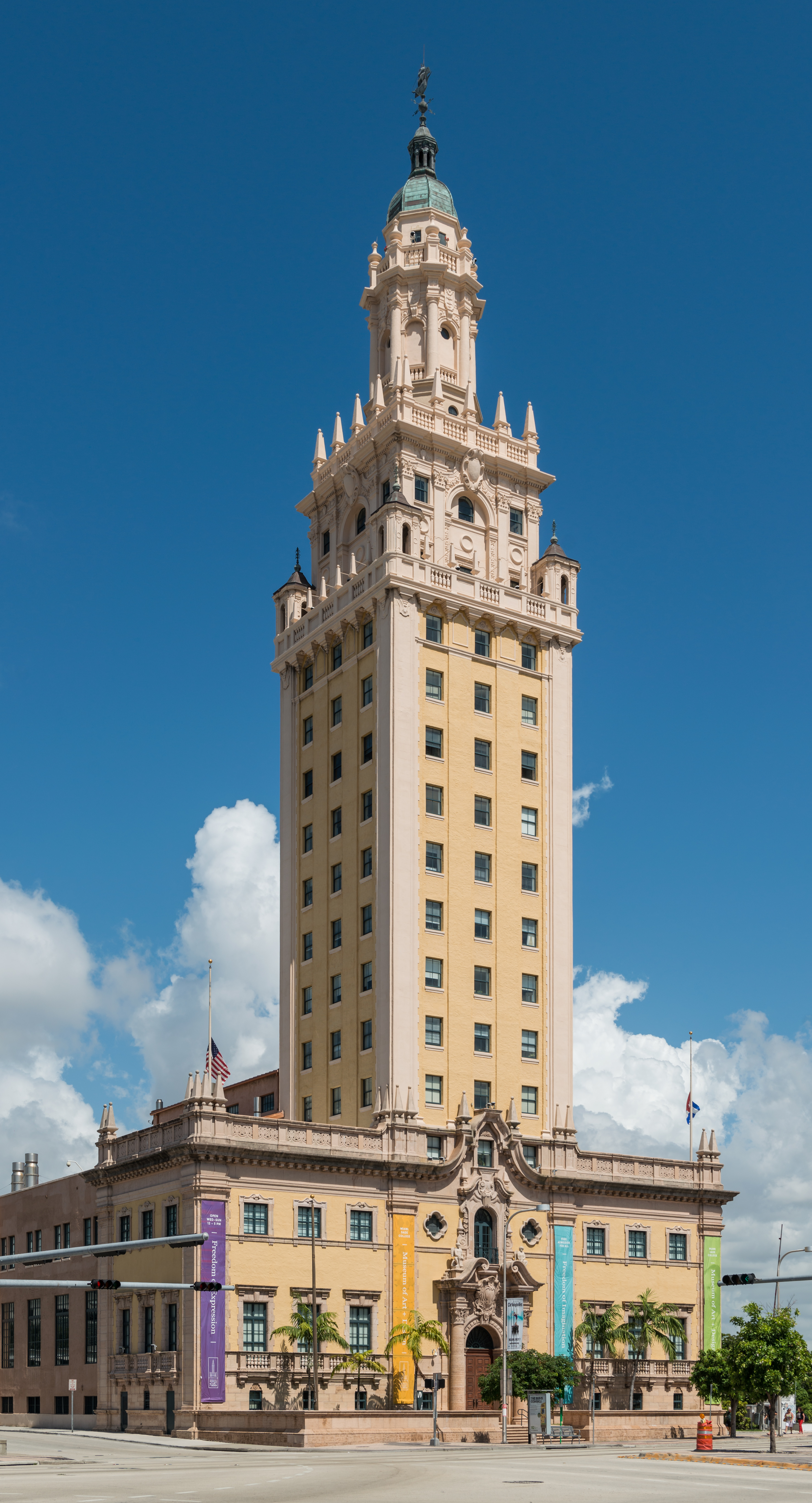
Front of building from Biscayne Blvd in 2016

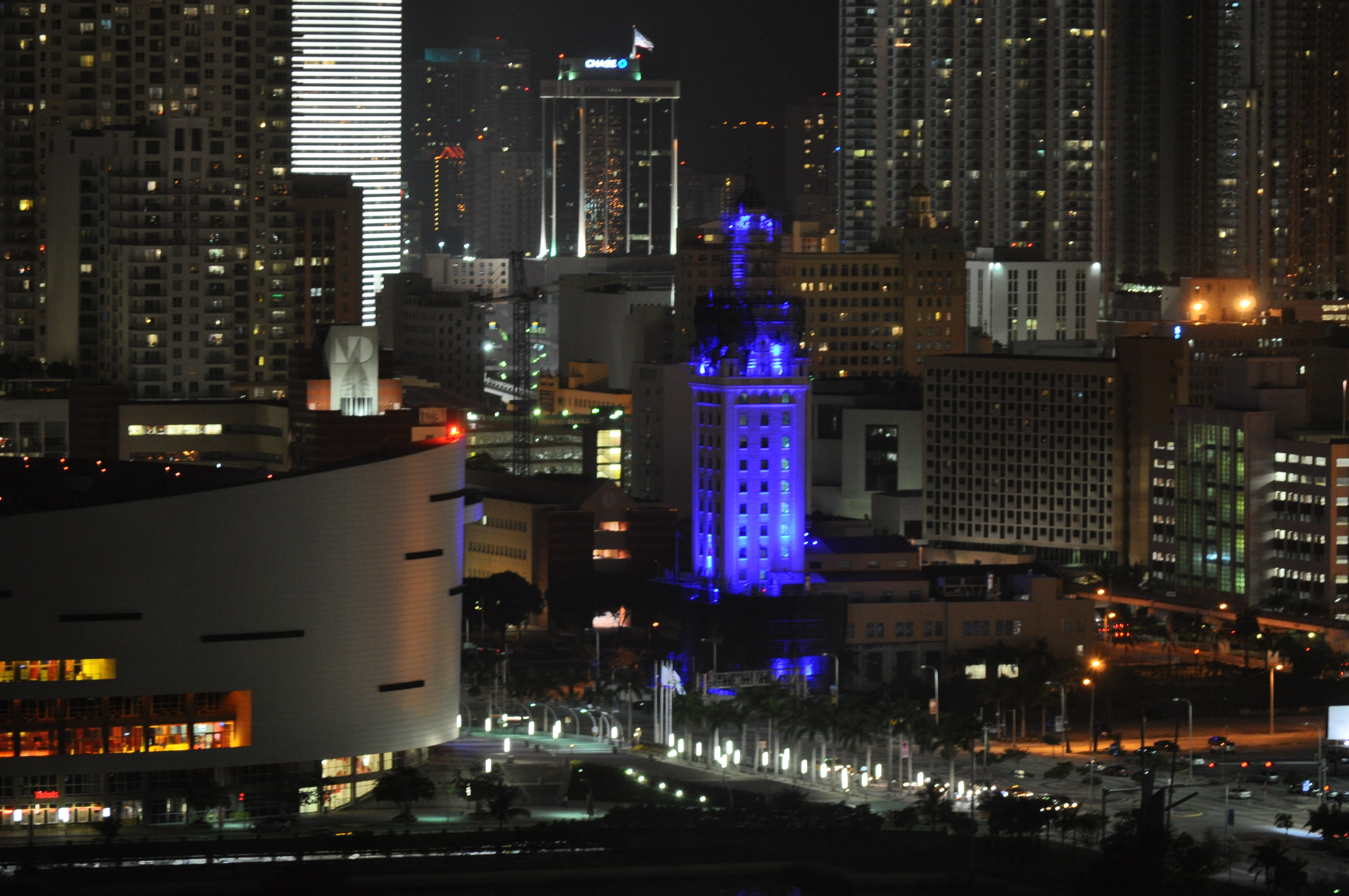
Miami Freedom Tower at Night with Rich Purple Lighting, April 2, 2011

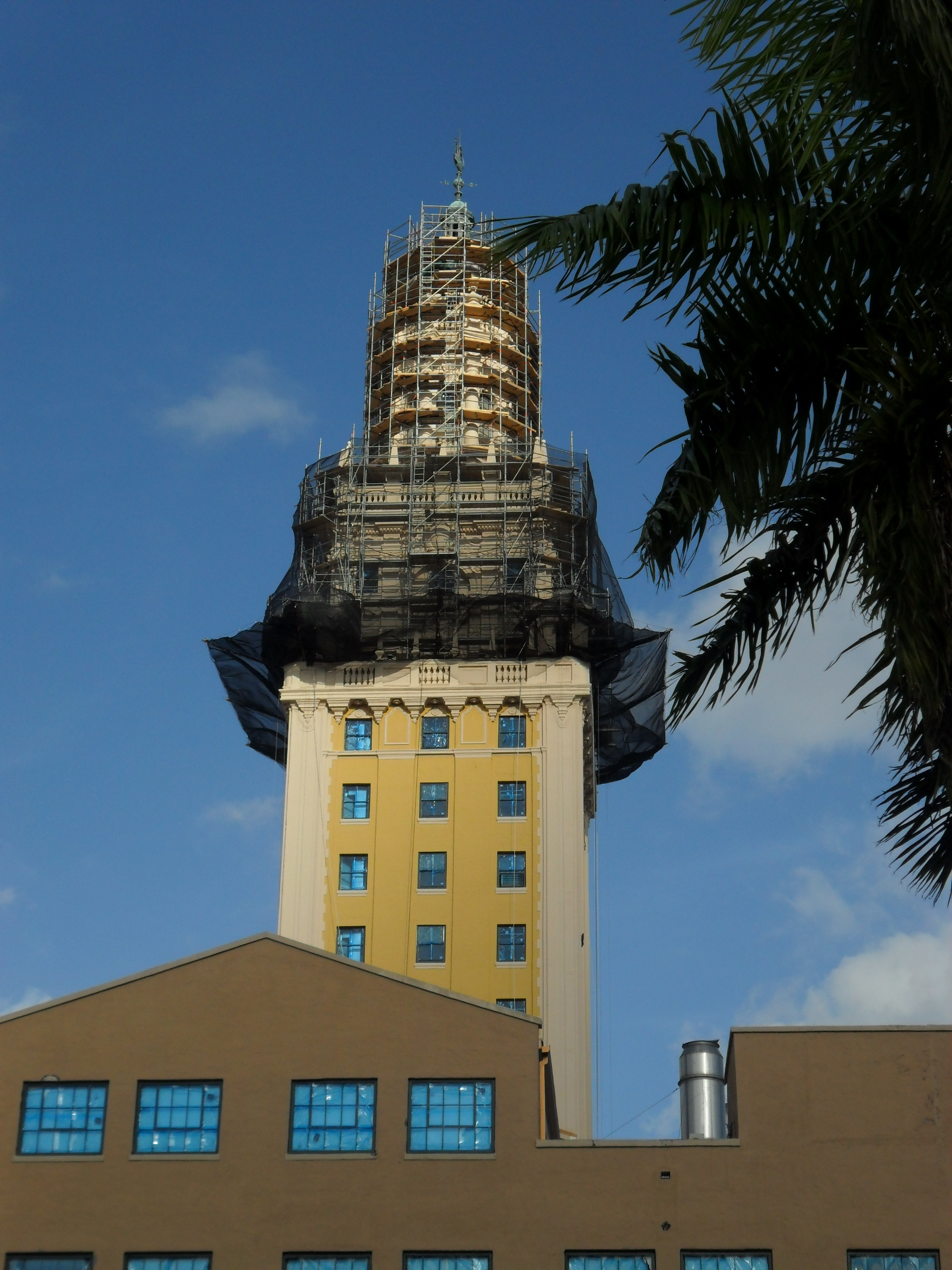
Maintenance on the Freedom Tower in 2010/2011, viewed from the west

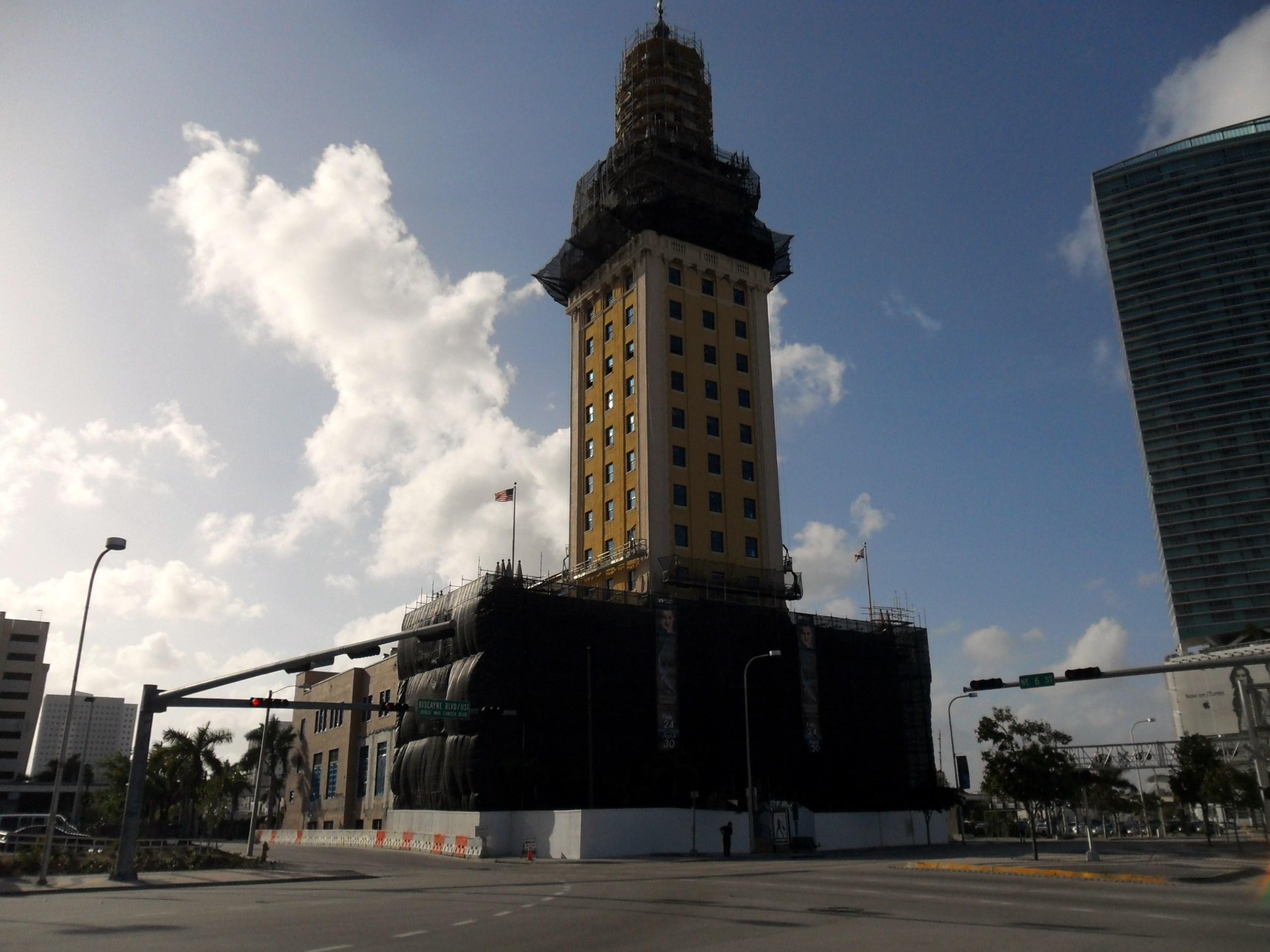
Preservation and maintenance work being done on the tower in March 2011

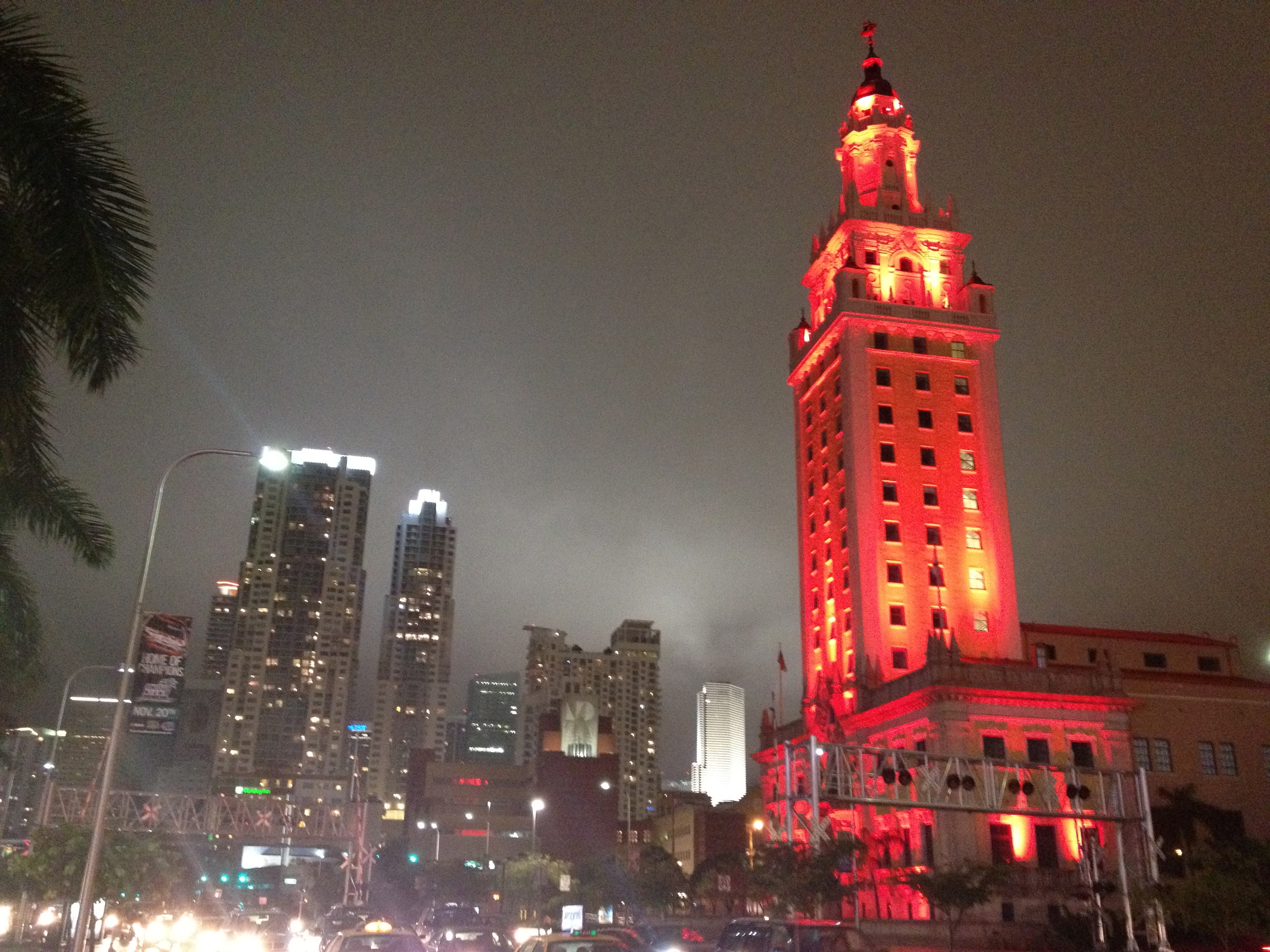
The tower on a cloudy and rainy night

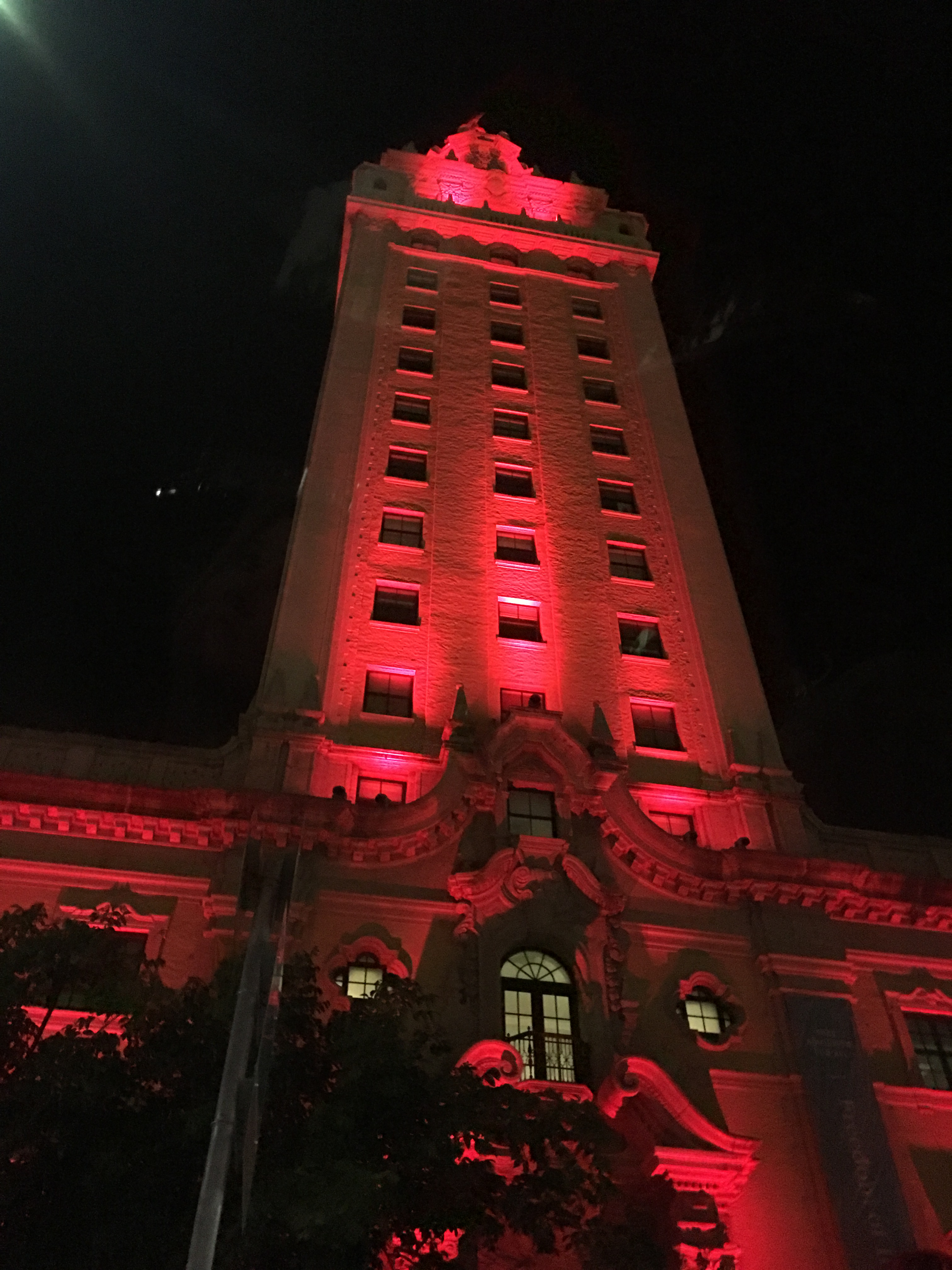
The Freedom Tower in downtown Miami on November 26, 2016, the day after Fidel Castro had passed

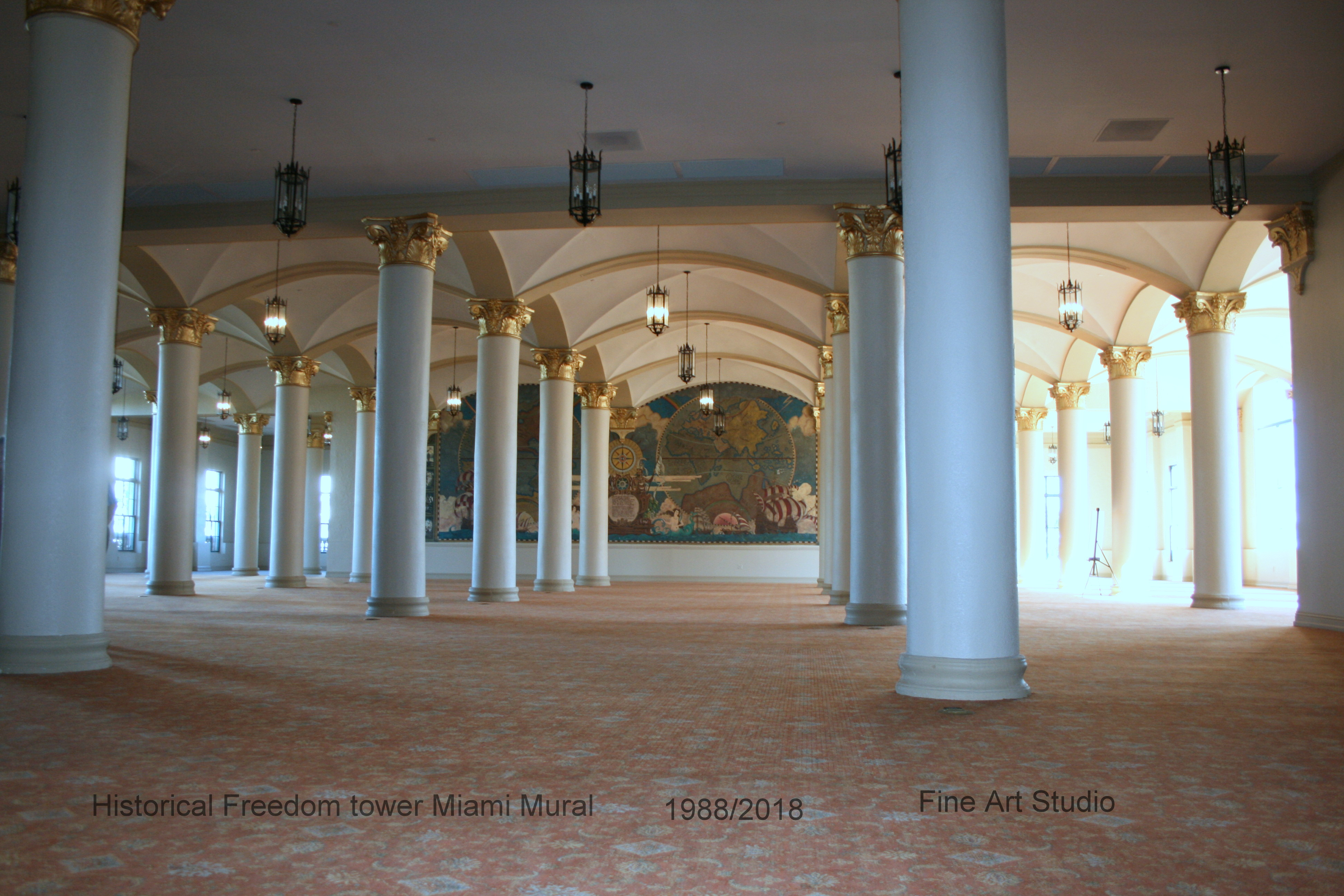
"Freedom Tower Miami New World Mural 1513". The mural's center image presents Juan Ponce de León and the Tequesta Chief Freedom Tower Miami Mural 1988, painted by Miami Artisans in 1988. Wade S. Foy, John Conroy, W Mark Coulthard, Ana Bikic.

Records
Preceded by McAllister Hotel	Tallest Building in Miami; 1925–1928; 78 m	Succeeded by Miami-Dade County Courthouse
Preceded by Heard National Bank Building	Tallest Building in Florida; 1925–1926; 78 m	Succeeded by Coral Gables Biltmore Hotel
