= Kaseya Center =

Arena in Miami, Florida, United States

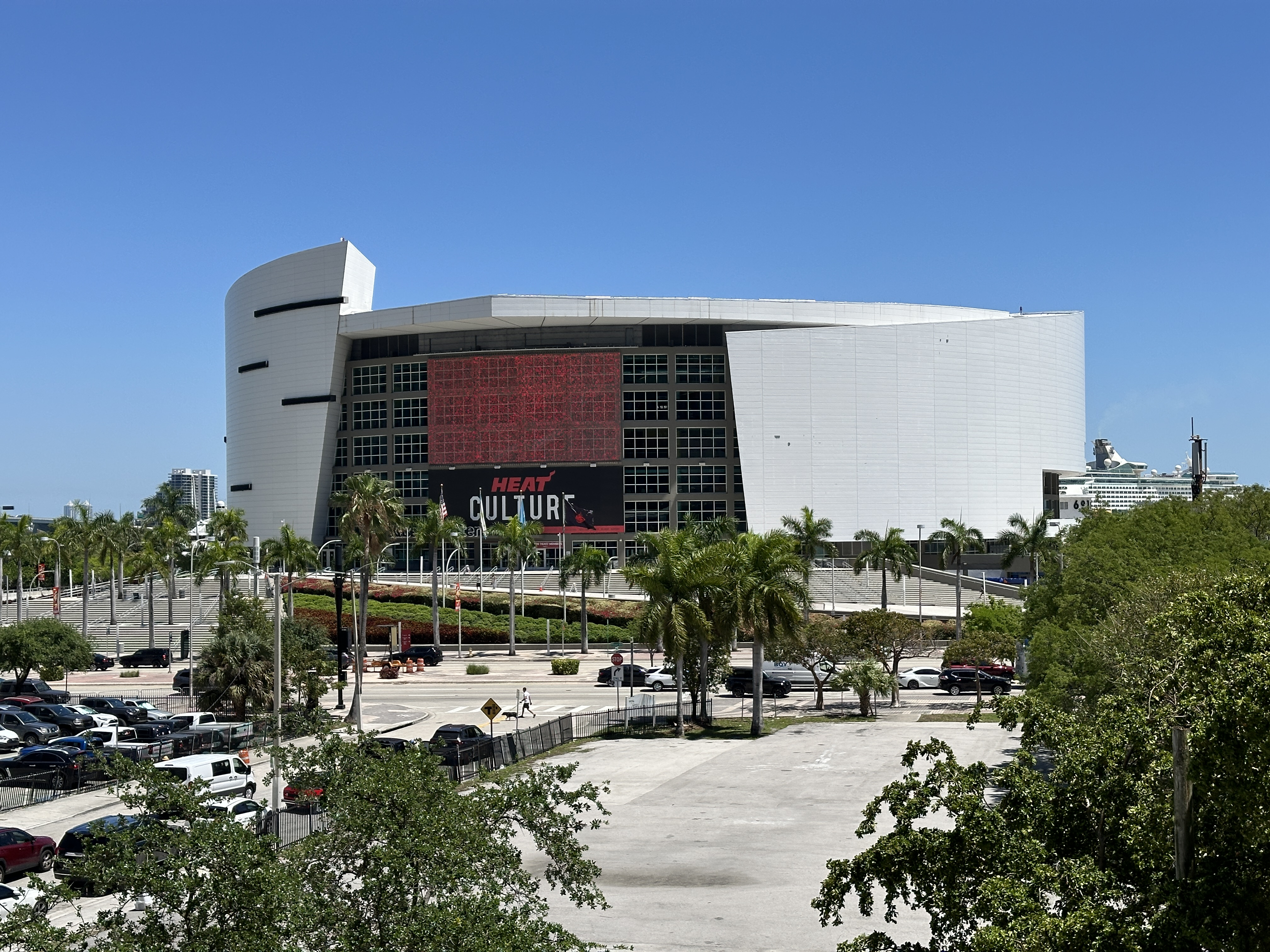
- The Kaseya Center in 2024.

- Location in Miami Location in Florida Location in the United States
- Former names: American Airlines Arena (1999–2021); FTX Arena (2021–2023); Miami-Dade Arena (2023)
- Address: 601 Biscayne Boulevard
- Location: Miami, Florida, U.S.
- Coordinates: 25°46′53″N 80°11′17″W
- Owner: Miami-Dade County
- Operator: Basketball Properties Ltd.
- Capacity: Basketball: 19,600; 16,500 (Without upper levels); Concerts: 5,000–20,021; Hockey: 14,447
- Surface: Multi-surface
- Public transit: Historic Overtown/Lyric Theatre; MiamiCentral; Freedom Tower; Miami Worldcenter
- Parking: 939 parking spaces

Construction
- Groundbreaking: February 6, 1998
- Opened: December 31, 1999
- Cost: US$213 million ($412 million in 2025 dollars)
- Architects: Arquitectonica; 360 Architecture (formerly Heinlein Schrock Stearns)
- Project manager: Parsons Brinckerhoff
- Structural engineer: Thornton Tomasetti
- Services engineer: Flack+Kurtz
- General contractor: Morse-Diesel/Odebrecht/Facchina
- Main contractors: John J. Kirlin, LLC; Simpson Constructors; Crown Corr Inc.

Tenants
- Miami Heat (NBA) (2000–present); Miami Sol (WNBA) (2000–2002)

Website
- kaseyacenter.com

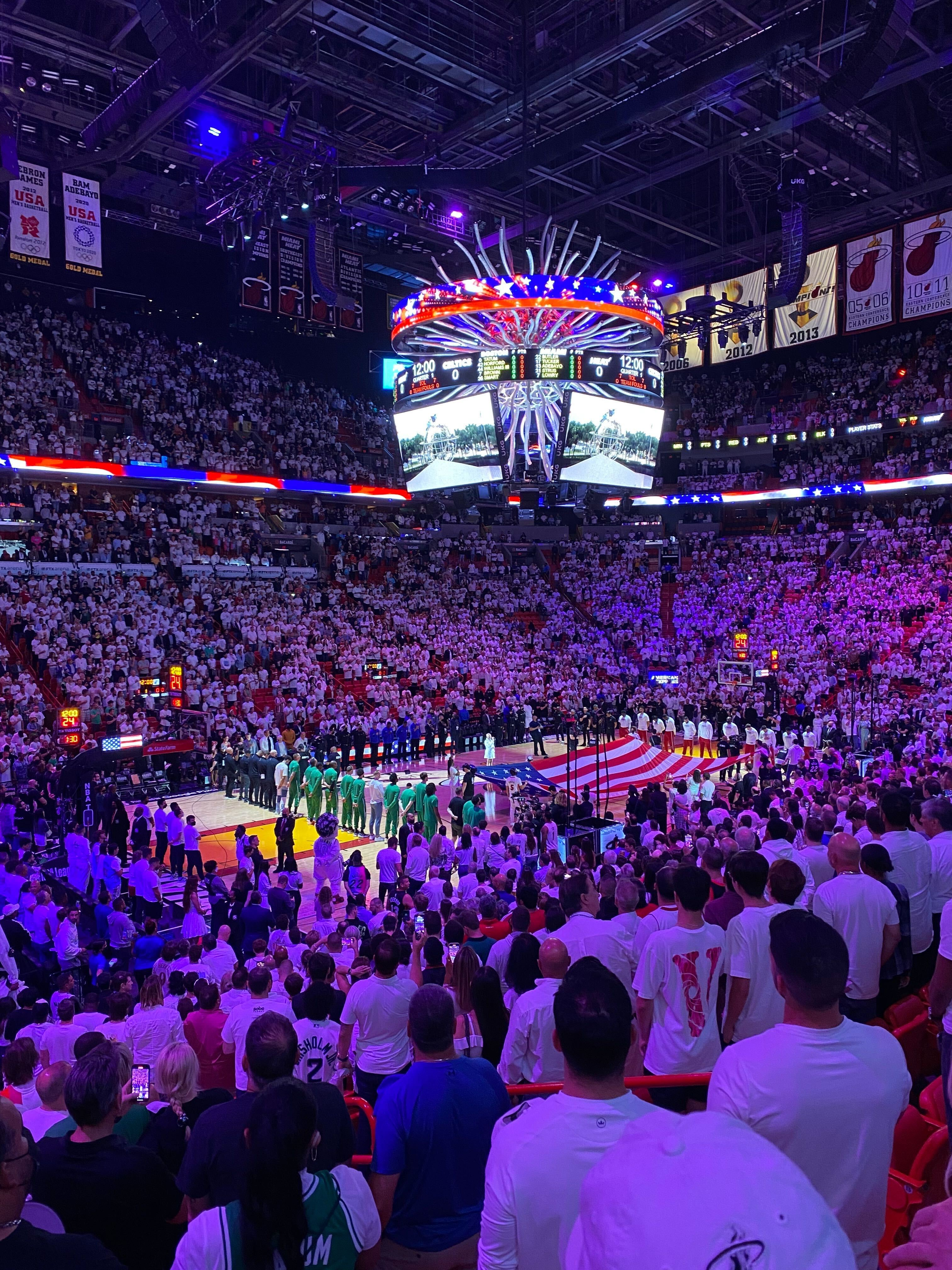
The arena interior during the opening ceremony of a 2022 playoff game between the Miami Heat and Boston Celtics

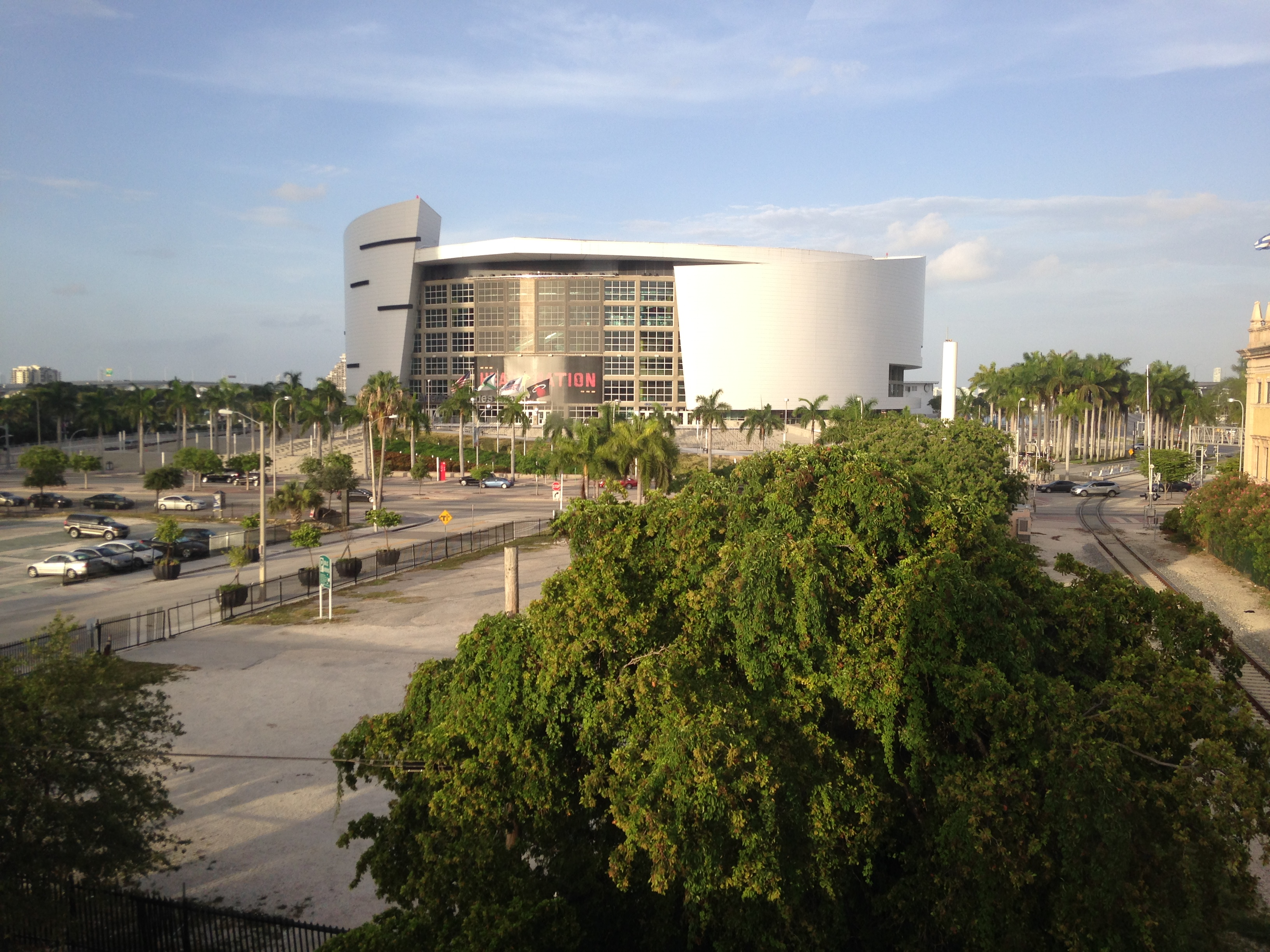
The arena as seen from Freedom Tower station

Kaseya Center is a multi-purpose arena on Biscayne Bay in Miami, Florida. The arena is home to the Miami Heat of the National Basketball Association (NBA). The arena was previously named American Airlines Arena from opening in 1999 until 2021, FTX Arena from 2021 until 2023, and Miami-Dade Arena during an interim period in 2023 after the bankruptcy of FTX. Since April 2023, the naming rights to the arena are owned by Kaseya under a 17-year, $117.4 million agreement. The official name of the arena's basketball court is the Pat Riley Court at Kaseya Center.

The arena has capacity for 19,500 people, including 2,105 club seats, 80 luxury suites, and 76 private boxes. Additionally, for more intimate performances, The Waterfront Theater, the largest indoor theater in Florida, is within the arena complex, seating between 3,000 and 5,800 patrons. The theater can be configured for concerts, worship events, family events, musical theatre shows and other stage productions. American Airlines, which has a hub at Miami International Airport, maintains a travel center at the venue.

The arena is directly served by the Miami Metrorail at Government Center station via free transfers to Metromover Omni Loop, providing direct service to Freedom Tower station and Park West station stations, within walking distance. It is also within walking distance from the Historic Overtown/Lyric Theatre station.

The arena has 939 parking spaces, with those spaces reserved for premium seat and Dewar's 12 Clubhouse ticket holders during Heat games. ParkJockey manages the arena's on-site parking.

== History ==
In 1997, the owners of the Miami Heat of the National Basketball Association, which then played in the eight-year-old, publicly financed Miami Arena, threatened to move to Broward County unless they were given the $38 million parcel of land for the new arena by Alex Penelas, then-mayor of Miami-Dade County. The agreement provided that the county receive 40% of annual profits of the arena, which was above $14 million.

Construction began on February 6, 1998. The arena was designed by Arquitectonica and 360 Architecture.

Kaseya Center opened as the American Airlines Arena on December 31, 1999, and its construction cost was $213 million. Architectural design team members included George Heinlein, Cristian Petschen, Reinaldo Borges, and Lance Simon. The arena's opening was inaugurated with a concert by Gloria Estefan. Two days later, on January 2, 2000, the Miami Heat played its first game in the new arena by defeating the Orlando Magic 111–103.

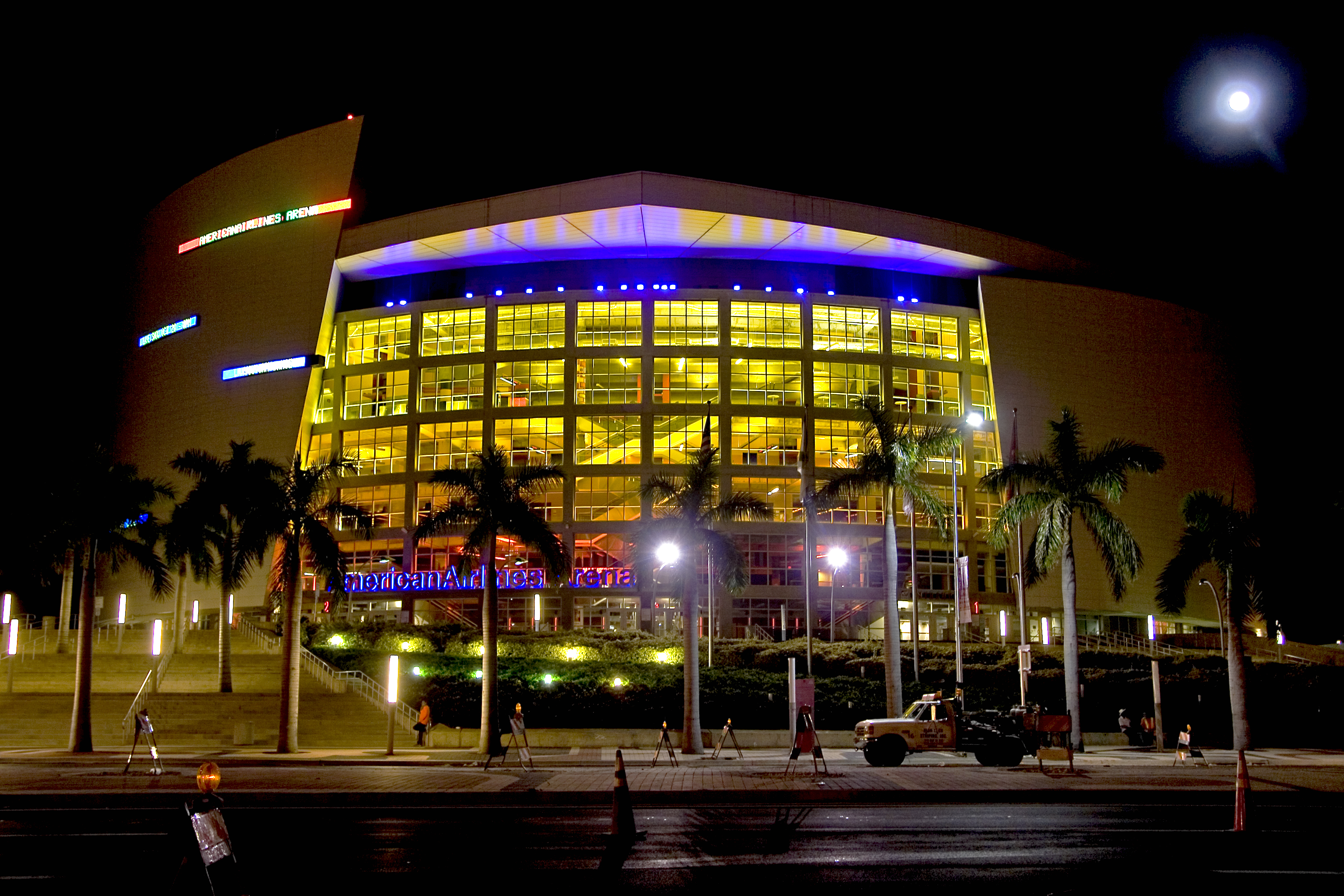
The main façade of the arena at night

As part of its sponsorship arrangement, American Airlines had a giant aircraft painted atop the arena's roof, with an American Airlines logo in the center. The design was visible from airplanes taking off and landing at Miami International Airport, where American has a hub. The arena also has luxury skyboxes called "Flagship Lounges", a trademark originally used for American's premium-class lounges at certain airports. Until the date that the arena was renamed in 2020–2021, the arena used the 1967-2013 logo of American Airlines.

The arena was sometimes referred to as "Triple-A" or "A^{3}" (A cubed).

The arena is known for its unusual scoreboard, designed by artist Christopher Janney and installed in 1998 as part of the original construction. Drawing on the underwater anemone forms, the scoreboard also changes colors depending on the atmosphere.

For concerts in an arena configuration, end stage capacity is 12,202 for 180° shows, 15,402 for 270° shows, and 18,309 for 360° shows. For center stage concerts the arena can seat 19,146.

WTVJ, the city's NBC-owned and operated station in Miami, had their Downtown Miami Studios in the back of the arena from 2001 until 2011.

In 2013, the Miami Heat paid rent on the arena for the first time pursuant to the percentage rent agreement with the county; the payment was $3.32 million.

On September 10, 2019, American Airlines said that it would not renew its naming rights upon expiration at the end of 2019. The American Airlines Arena court decals were removed from the Heat's floor before the 2020–21 season and replaced temporarily with the logo of team/league vehicle sponsor Kia Motors.

In March 2021, FTX acquired the naming rights to the arena in a $135 million, 19-year agreement. The NBA approved the deal in early April, and the arena was renamed FTX Arena in June 2021, just after the Miami Heat were defeated by the Milwaukee Bucks in the first round of the 2021 NBA playoffs.

As part of the bankruptcy of FTX, the naming rights agreement was terminated effective January 2023. After three months under the temporary name of Miami-Dade Arena, a 17-year naming rights agreement was reached with Miami-based software company Kaseya to name the arena Kaseya Center beginning April 2023. Under the terms of the contract, the county receives the majority of the naming rights revenue while the Heat receives $2 million annually.

In October 2024, it was announced that the court would be dedicated to longtime coach and executive Pat Riley, who led the Heat to three championships and helped the team acquire LeBron James and Chris Bosh in 2010.

== Notable events ==
=== Circus ===
In January 2017, the closing of the Ringling Bros. and Barnum & Bailey Circus was announced after shows at the arena.

=== Basketball ===
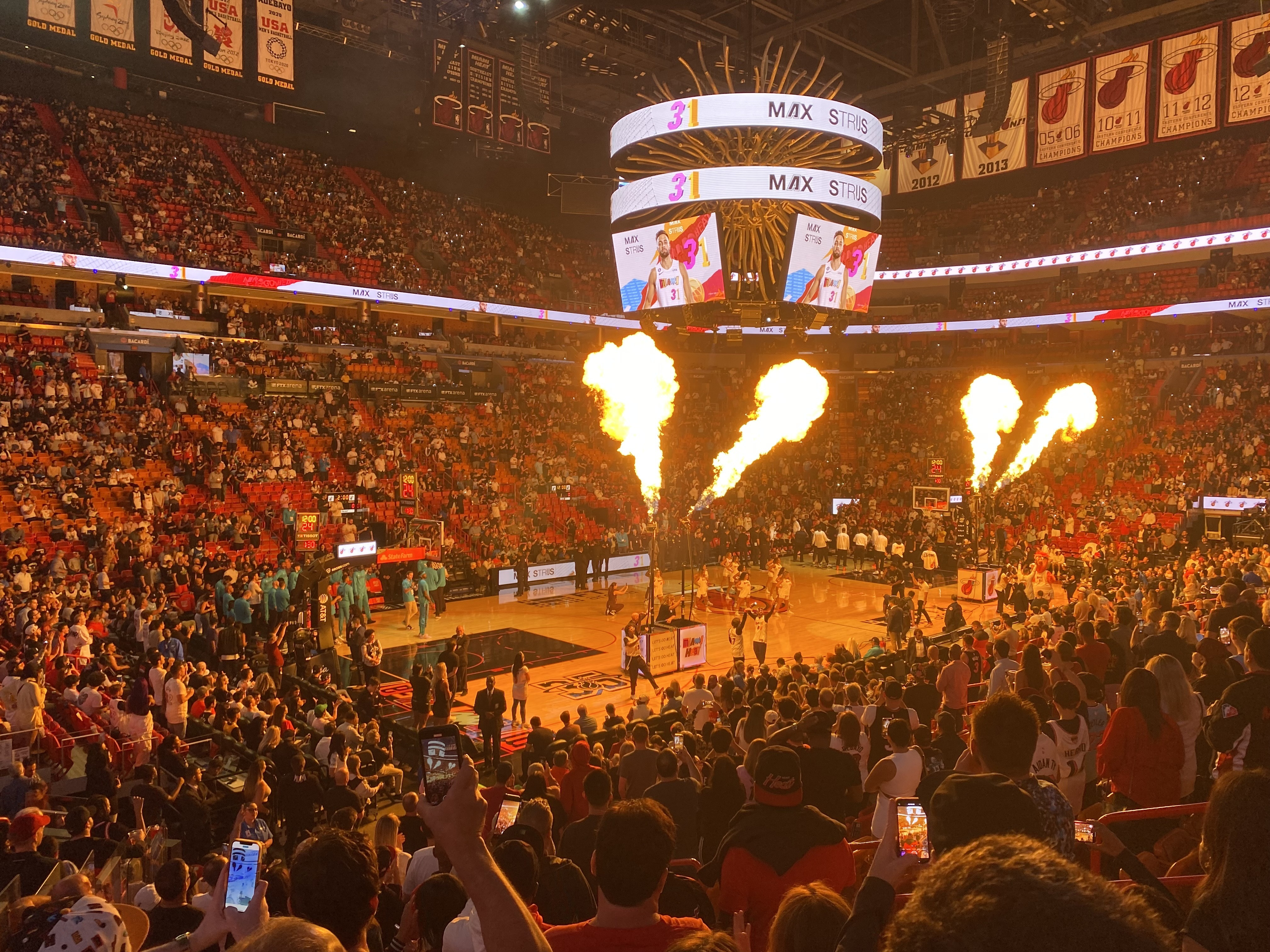
Player introductions before a Miami Heat game in 2022

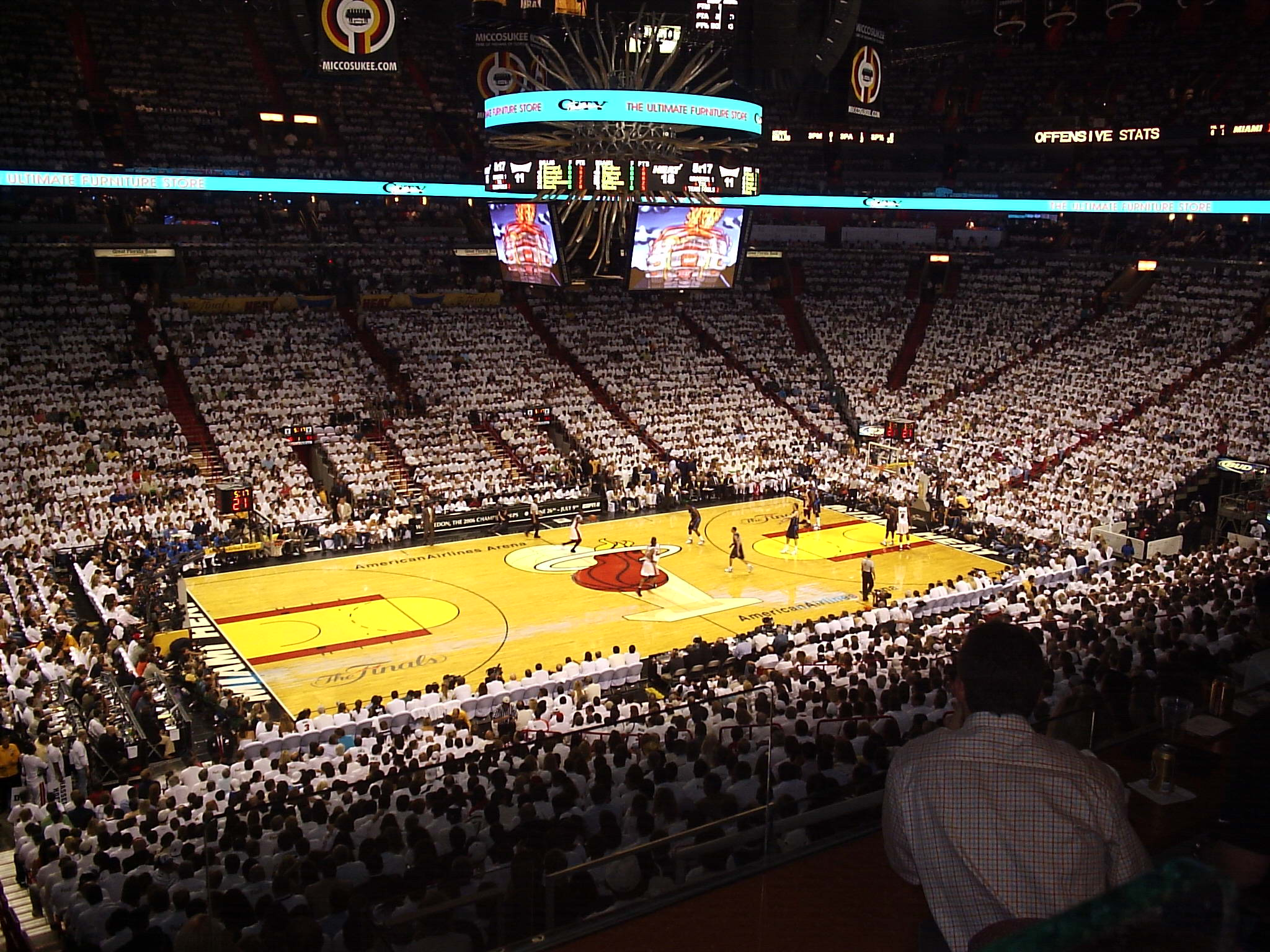
The arena during Game 3 of the 2006 NBA Finals

- The then-named American Airlines Arena, along with the American Airlines Center in Dallas, hosted the 2006 NBA Finals and the 2011 NBA Finals as the Miami Heat played the Dallas Mavericks. The Heat won the championship in 2006 in Dallas and the Mavericks won the 2011 rematch in Miami. These series were the first and second appearances in the NBA Finals for both franchises. As the airline held naming rights to both venues, people nicknamed the matchups as the "American Airlines series".
- The arena hosted the 2012, 2013 and 2014 NBA Finals along with the Chesapeake Energy Arena in Oklahoma City in 2012, and the AT&T Center in San Antonio in 2013 and 2014. In 2012, the Heat defeated the Oklahoma City Thunder in five games, winning the championship at home. In 2013, the Heat played the San Antonio Spurs. The Heat faced a 3–2 series deficit returning to Miami but won games 6 and 7 to defend their championship. In 2014, the Spurs defeated the Heat in five games in San Antonio and won the championship and the rematch.
- The arena hosted the 2023 NBA Finals under its current name of Kaseya Center, along with the Ball Arena in Denver as the Heat played the Denver Nuggets. The Nuggets defeated the Heat in five games to win their first championship.
- Since 2015, the arena has hosted the annual Hoophall Miami Invitational, an NCAA Division I college basketball showcase event.

=== Professional wrestling ===
The arena hosted Uncensored (2000), the World Championship Wrestling WCW Uncensored pay-per-view. Four major WWE pay-per-view events have been held at the arena: the Royal Rumble in 2006, Survivor Series in 2007 and 2010, and WWE Hell in a Cell in 2013. It has also hosted various episodes of WWE Raw and WWE SmackDown, most notably featuring the return of Brock Lesnar on April 2, 2012.

=== Mixed martial arts ===
On April 25, 2003, the arena hosted the first Ultimate Fighting Championship event in Florida, UFC 42: Sudden Impact. The UFC returned to the arena after twenty years on April 8, 2023, for UFC 287: Pereira vs. Adesanya 2. The promotion returned again on March 9, 2024, for UFC 299: O'Malley vs. Vera 2. The UFC returned a year later on April 12, 2025, for UFC 314: Volkanovski vs. Lopes. The promotion returned to the arena on April 11, 2026 to host UFC 327: Procházka vs. Ulberg.

=== Other sports ===
- The arena features a regulation NHL ice rink, though the arena has never hosted the sport, as the Florida Panthers have played in Sunrise at the Amerant Bank Arena since October 1998. The rink, lined with a smaller wall, instead accommodates ice shows such as Disney on Ice.
- The Waterfront Theatre at the arena hosted the 2020 NFL Honors on February 1, 2020, which was broadcast by Fox Broadcasting Company.
- The arena hosted the Jake Paul vs. Anthony Joshua heavyweight professional boxing match on December 19, 2025.

=== Music ===
Notable musicians to perform at the arena include Olivia Rodrigo, Doja Cat, Charli XCX, Troye Sivan, Gloria Estefan, Phish, Shakira, Dua Lipa, Kylie Minogue, Mariah Carey, Cher, Kelly Clarkson, Clay Aiken, Britney Spears, U2, Soda Stereo, Kanye West, Tina Turner, Celine Dion, Justin Bieber, Lady Gaga, Coldplay, Jennifer Lopez, SZA, Madonna, Miley Cyrus, Hillsong United, Justin Timberlake, One Direction, Katy Perry, Demi Lovato, Ariana Grande, Chris Brown, Janet Jackson, Billie Eilish, Taylor Swift, Twenty One Pilots, Tame Impala, The Weeknd, Benson Boone, Florence and the Machine, Rihanna, Selena Gomez, Maroon 5, Adele, Carrie Underwood, Jimmie Allen, Phoebe Bridgers, Lorde, Katseye, Rosalía, Ricardo Arjona, RBD, and Tini.

The 2004 and 2005 MTV Video Music Awards, Sensation, as well as the For Darfur benefit concert were held at the arena.

On August 28, 2026, coinciding with the awarding of the Miss Universe pageant to Puerto Rico, the 2026 Miss USA Pageant will be held at Kaseya Center.

== Awards ceremonies ==
The arena hosts the annual Premio Lo Nuestro Latin music awards since 2001. The awards are held on a Thursday night in late February. The Kaseya Center hosted the Latin Grammy Awards, with the 2003, the 2020 and in 2024 on November 14. Kaseya Center also hosted the 2004 and 2005 MTV Video Music Awards as well as the 2020 NFL Honors on February 1, 2020.

== In popular culture ==
The Sahara Arena in the 2026 video game Grand Theft Auto VI is based on the Kaseya Center.

== Gallery ==
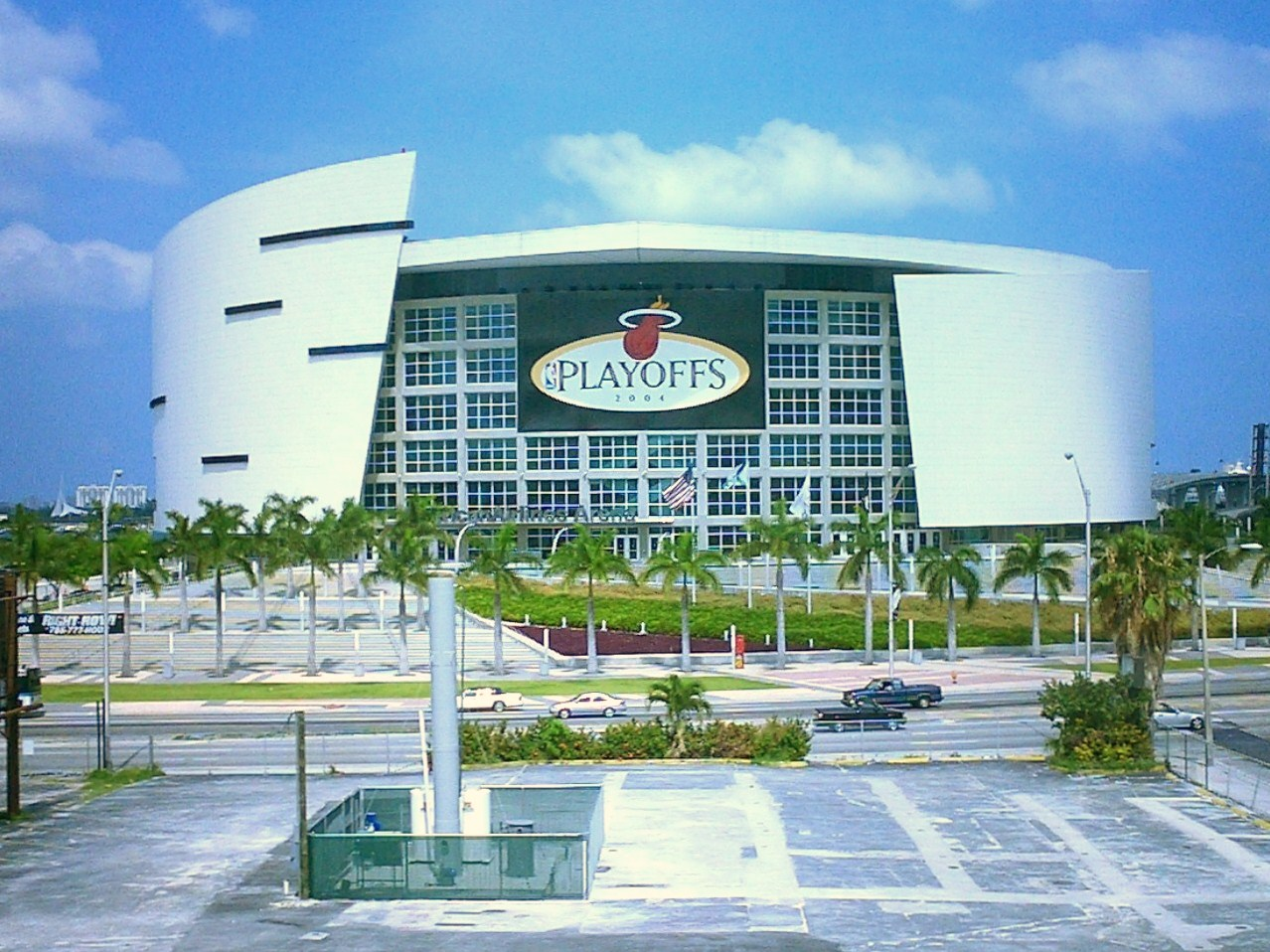
The arena during the 2004 NBA playoffs

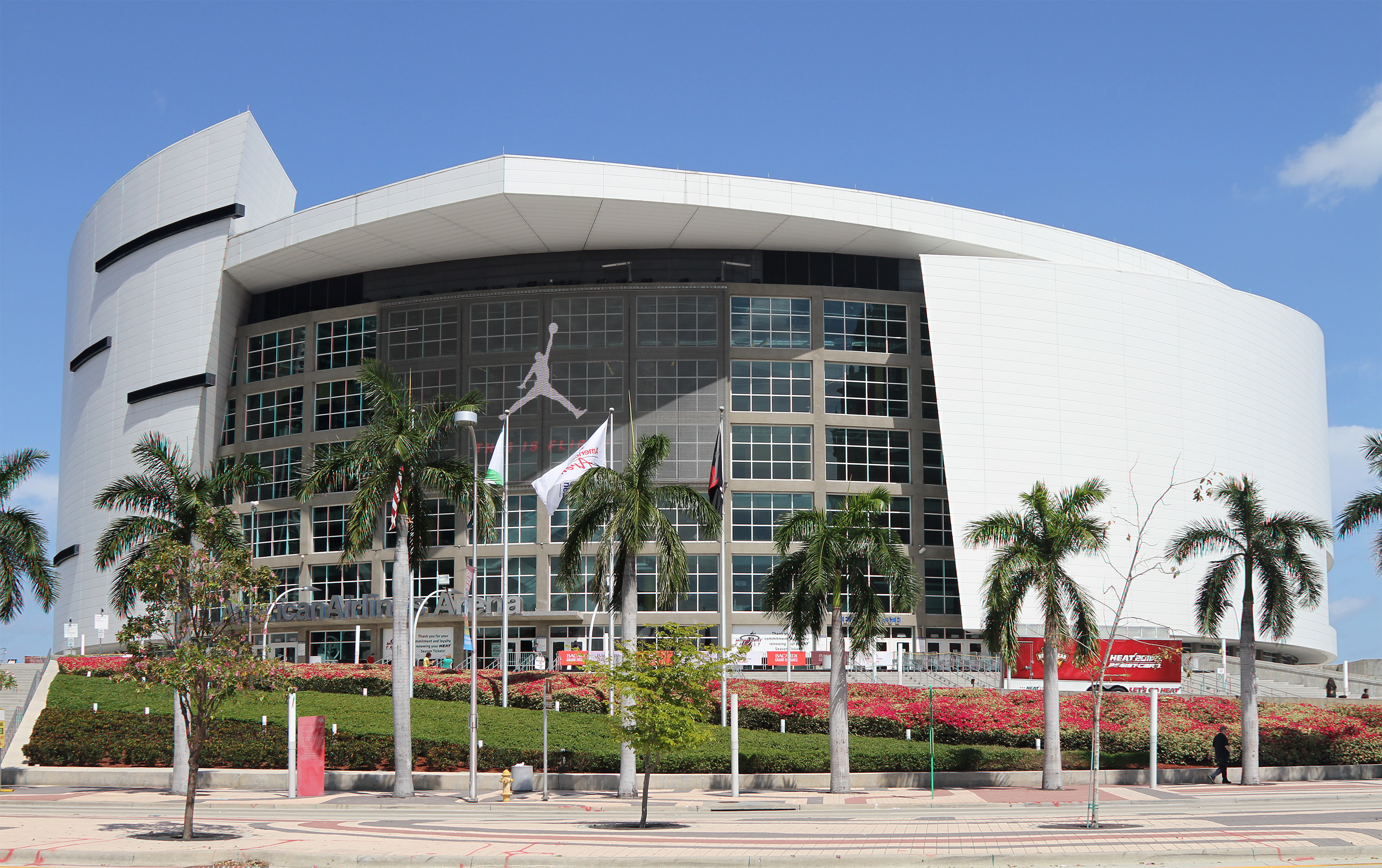
The arena in 2012

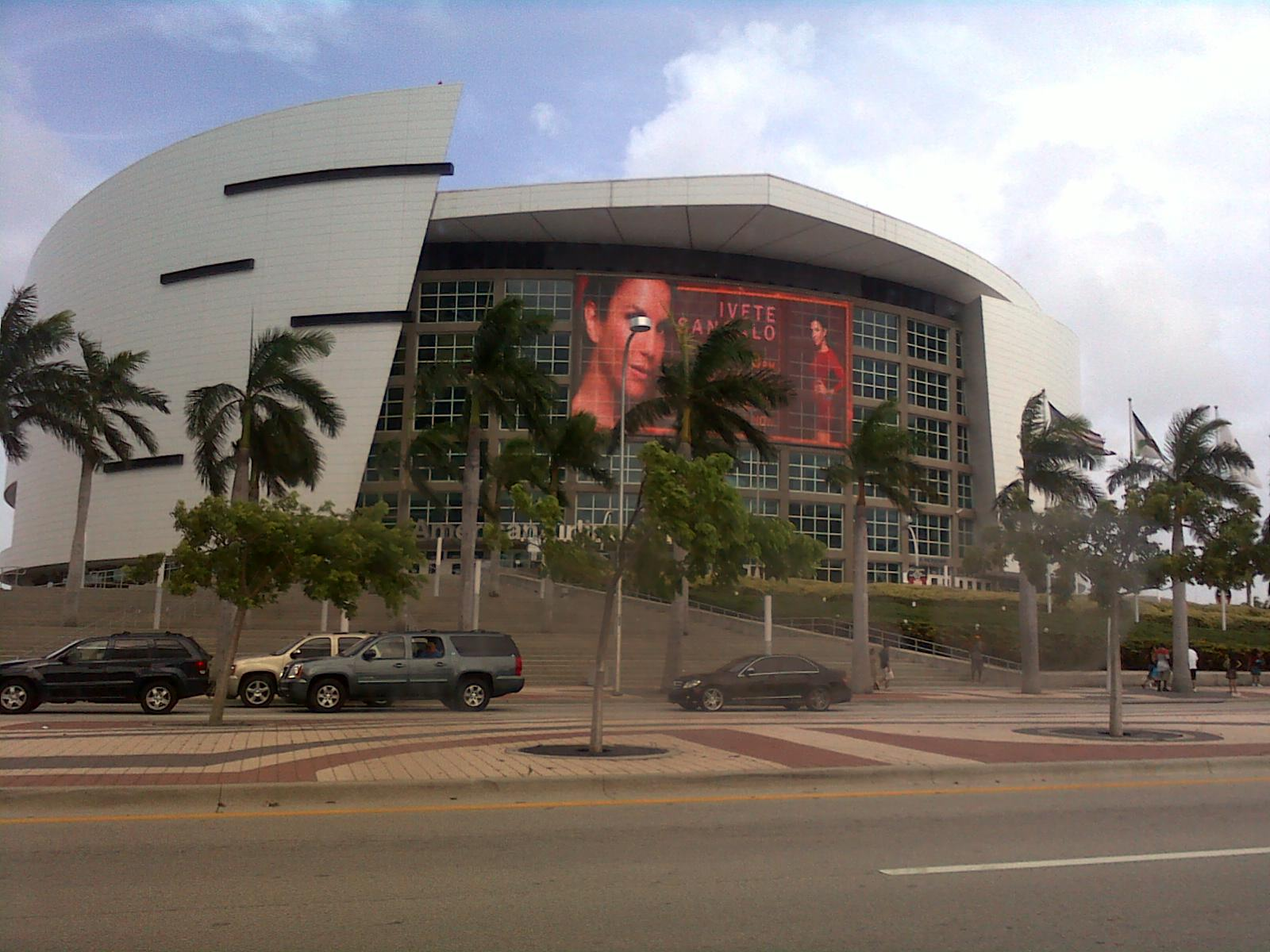
Front view of the arena in July 2010

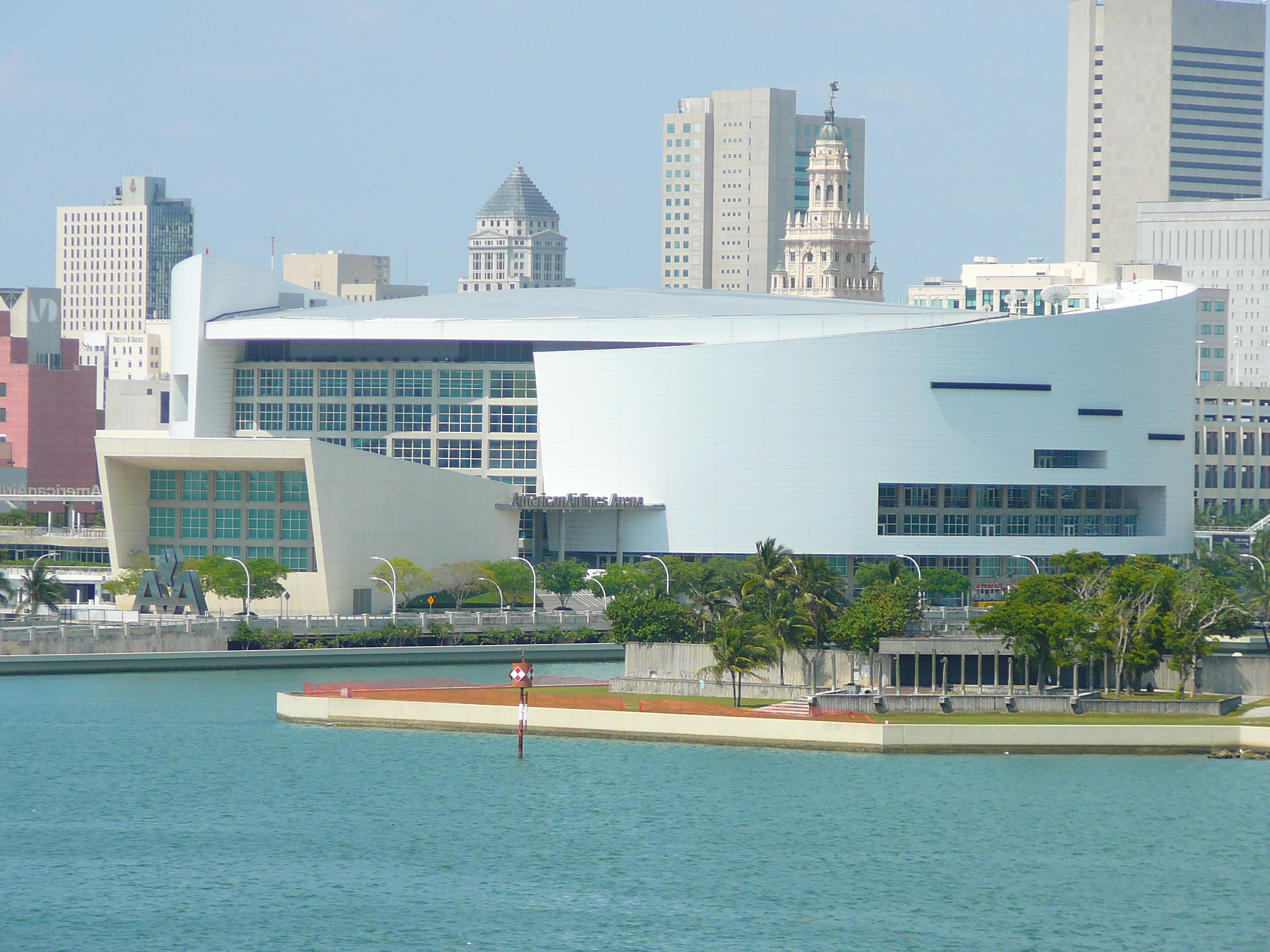
View from Biscayne Bay

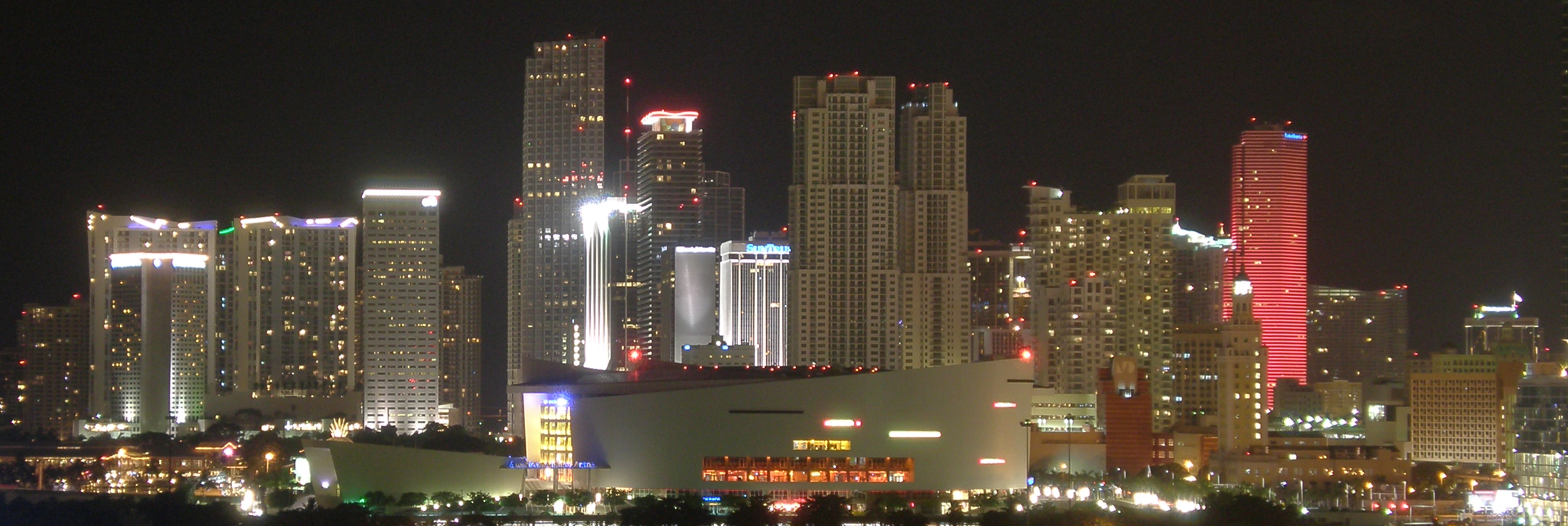
View from the north at night

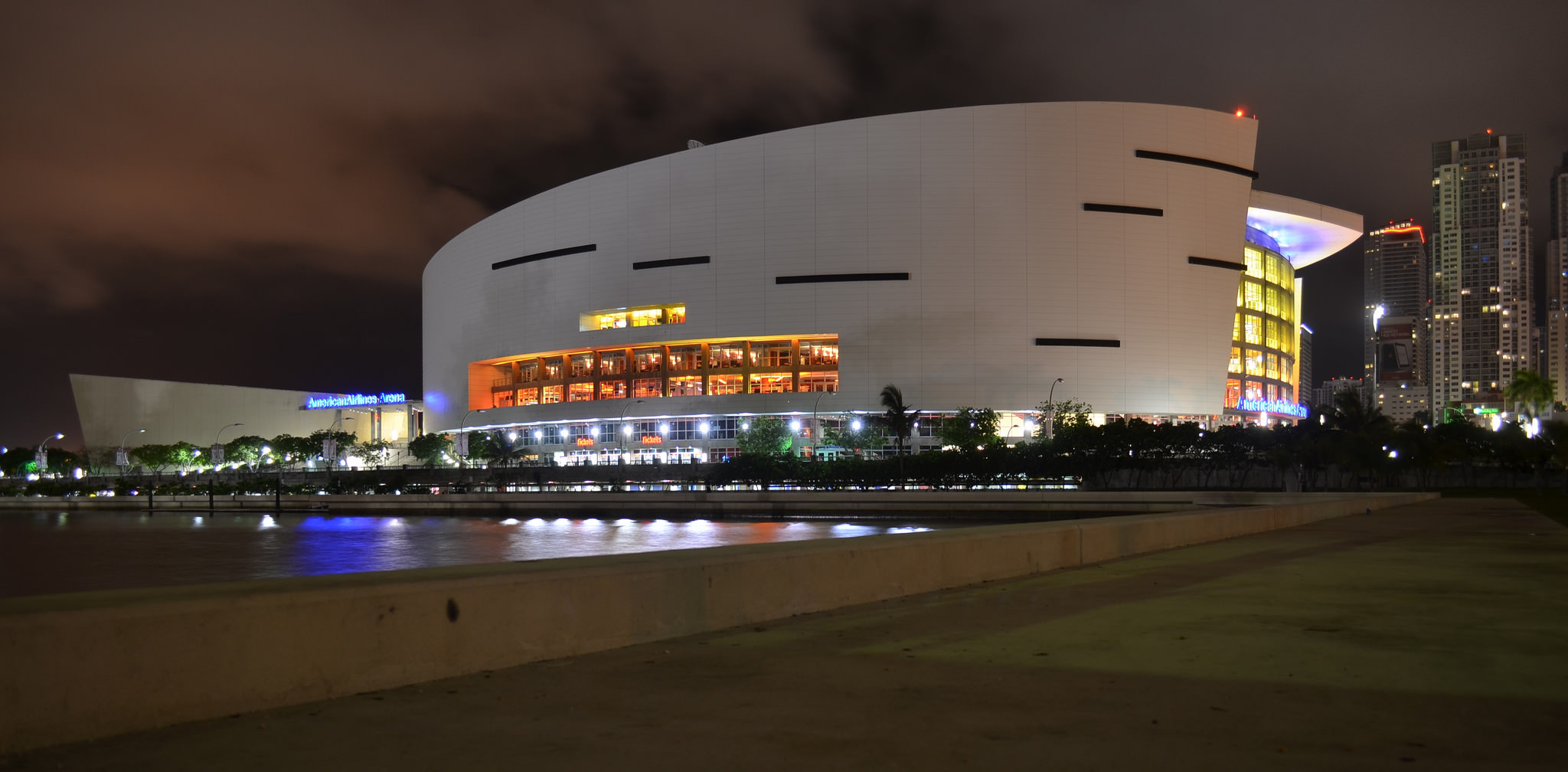
The arena at night

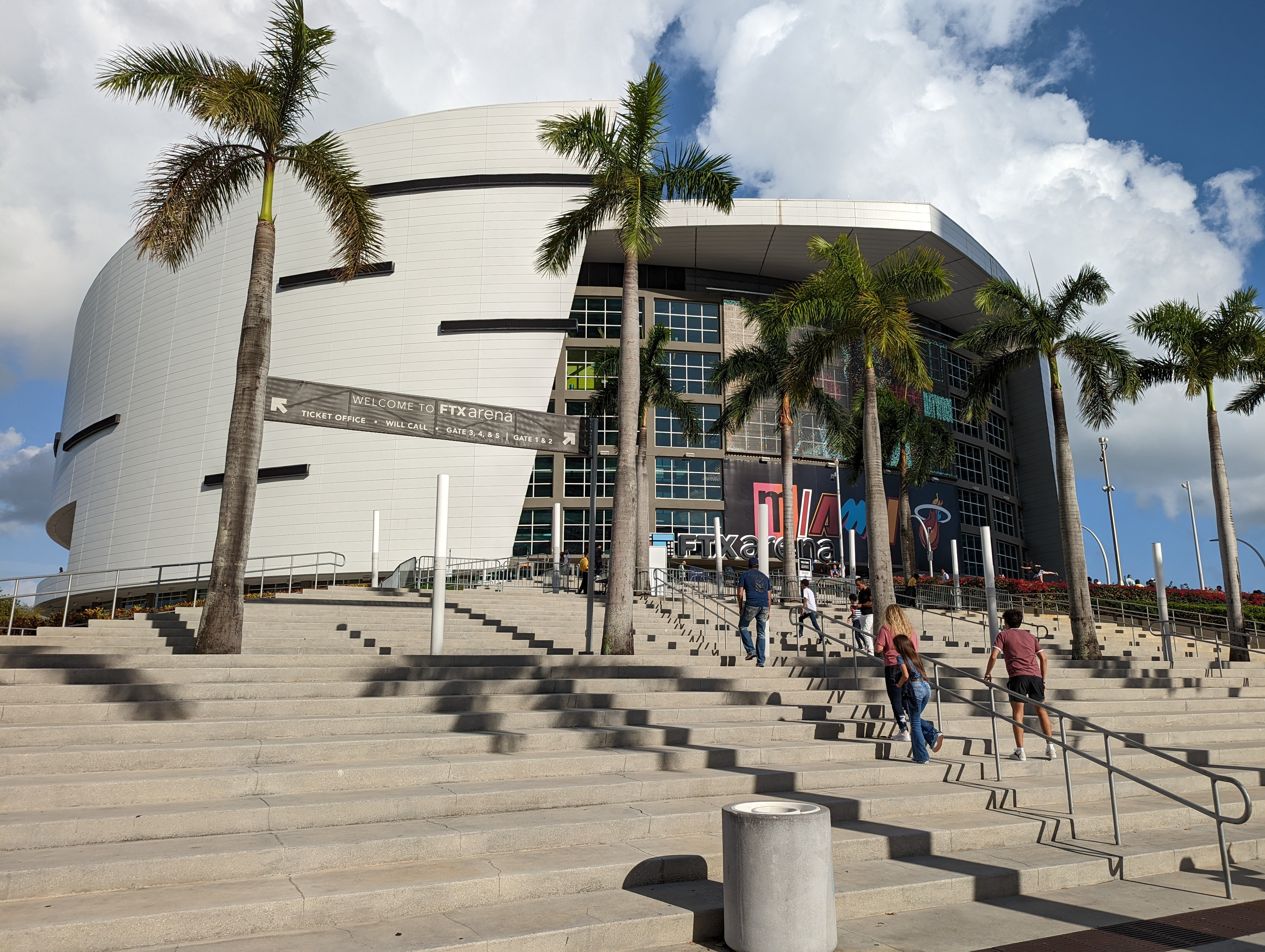
The arena in March 2022

== See also ==
- List of indoor arenas by capacity
- List of indoor arenas in the United States

| Preceded by Miami Arena | Home of the Miami Heat; 1999–present | Succeeded by current |
| Preceded by none | Home of the Miami Sol; 2000–2002 | Succeeded by none |
| Preceded by Save Mart Center | Home of the Royal Rumble; 2006 | Succeeded by AT&T Center |
