= Central Baptist Church (Miami) =

- U.S. National Register of Historic Places
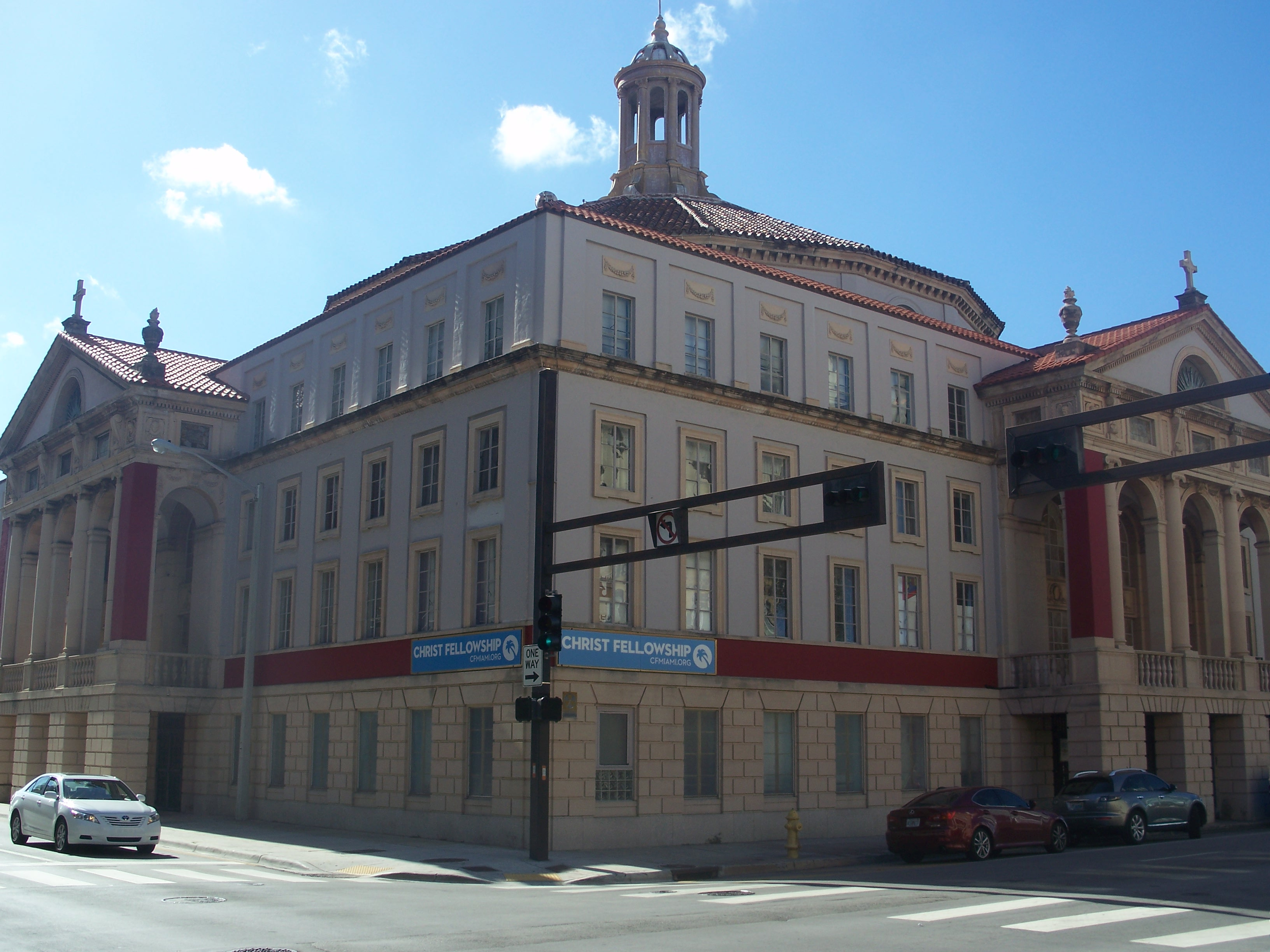

- Location within Miami Location within Florida Location within the United States
- Location: 500 N.E. 1st Ave., Miami, Florida
- Coordinates: 25°46′31″N 80°11′31″W
- Area: less than one acre
- Built: 1926
- Built by: Ley, Fred T., & Co.
- Architect: Dougherty & Gardner
- Architectural style: Classical Revival
- MPS: Downtown Miami MRA
- NRHP reference No.: 88002988
- Added to NRHP: 4 January 1989

The Central Baptist Church is a historic church in Miami, Florida. It is located at 500 Northeast 1st Avenue. On January 4, 1989, it was added to the U.S. National Register of Historic Places. On October 21, 2007, Central Baptist Church voted to merge with Christ Fellowship, originally named First Baptist Church of Perrine. The church was built in 1925.

The Central Baptist Church is directly served by the Miami Metrorail at Government Center via free transfers to the Metromover, which provides direct service to the College North station. The church is also within walking distance from the Historic Overtown/Lyric Theatre Metrorail station.
