= School Board station =

Miami Metromover station

School Board
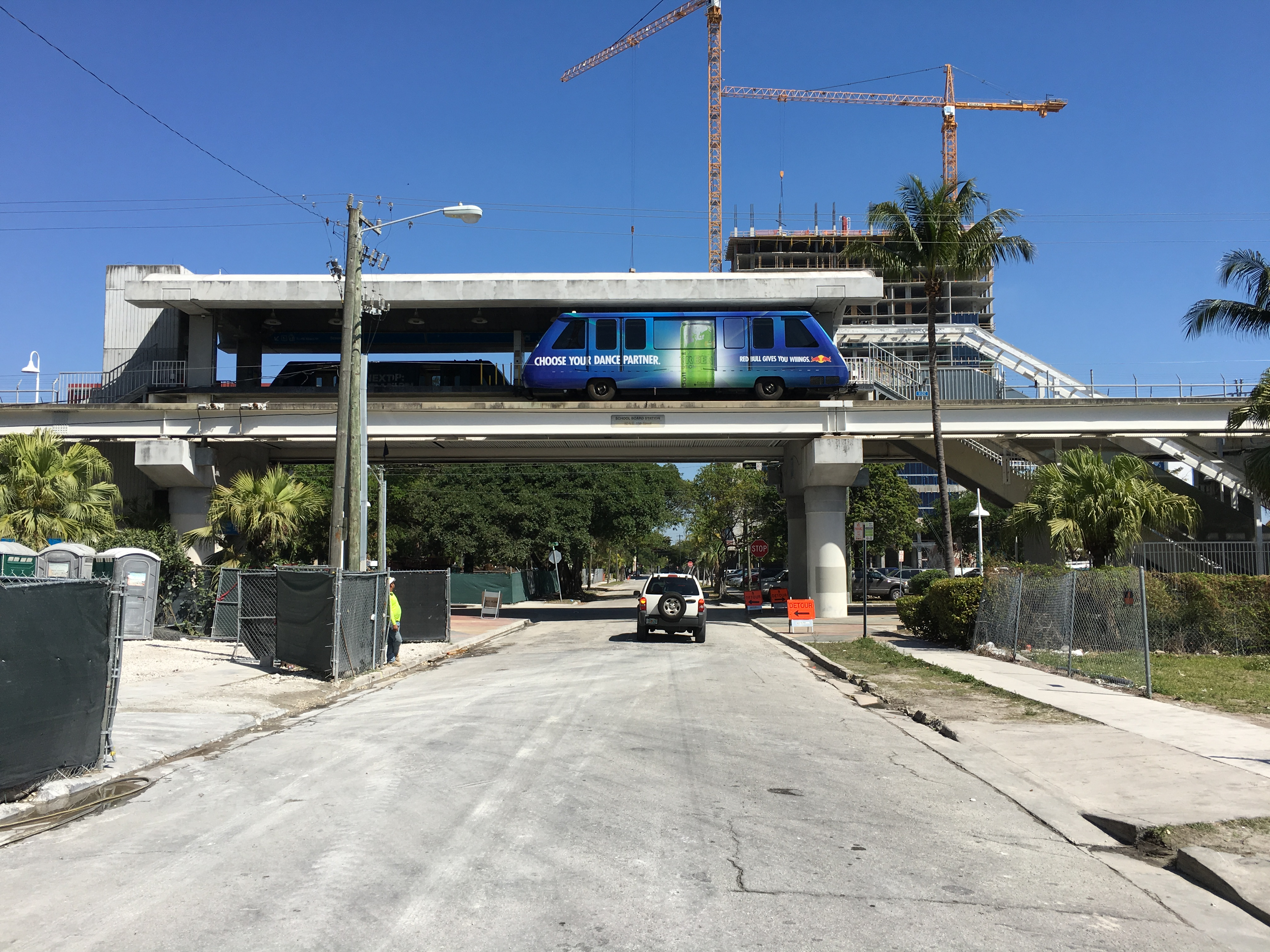
- Station in March 2017 with nearby construction underway (Canvas)

General information
- Location: 50 NE 15th Street; Miami, Florida 33132
- Coordinates: 25°47′21″N 80°11′37″W
- Owner: Miami-Dade County
- Platforms: 1 island platform
- Tracks: 2
- Connections: Metrobus: 9

Construction
- Accessible: Yes

History
- Opened: May 26, 1994

Services
Preceding station	Miami-Dade Transit	Following station
Adrienne Arsht Center toward Downtown	Omni Loop	Terminus
Location

School Board is a Metromover station near the northwestern end of Downtown, Miami, Florida, south of Midtown and west of the Arts & Entertainment District. It is the northern terminus of the people mover system.

This station is located near the intersection of Northeast 15th Avenue and Miami Place, about one block north of the Miami-Dade County Public Schools Administration Building. It opened to service May 26, 1994. School Board has consistently been one of the lowest used stations in the system, with well under 1,000 riders a day. As of 2017, two large apartment buildings totaling over 1,200 units were under construction nearby, such as Canvas and Square Station, Art Plaza, and Miami Plaza, with others planned. Prior to this, the station was surrounded by mostly empty lots.

== Places of interest ==
- Miami-Dade County Public Schools Administration Building
- Fisher Medical Building
- Overtown
