= Bayfront Park station =

Miami Metromover station

Bayfront Park
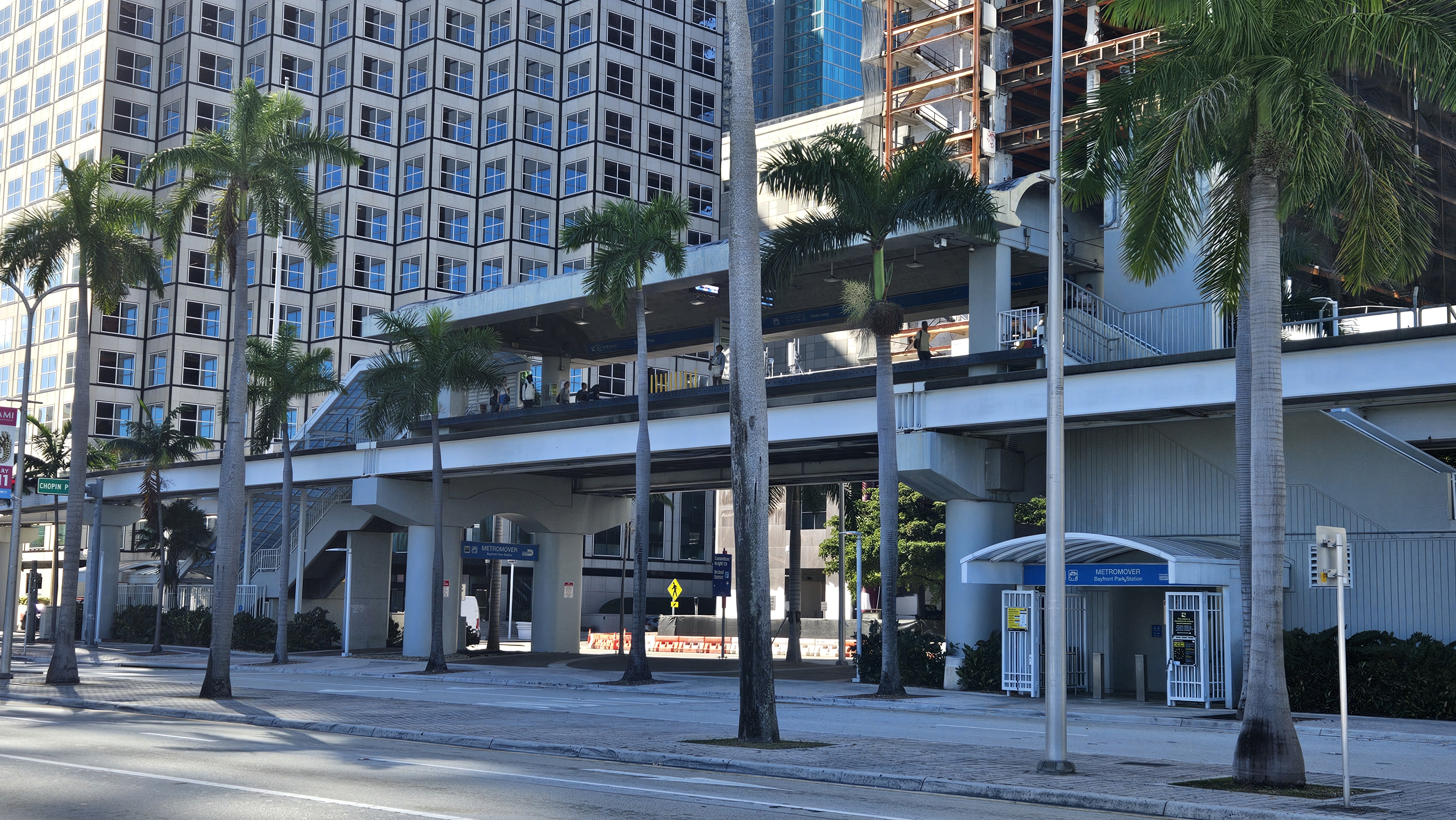
- Bayfront Park Station in 2026

General information
- Location: 150 Biscayne Boulevard; Miami, Florida 33132
- Coordinates: 25°46′23″N 80°11′14″W
- System: Metromover people mover station
- Owner: Miami-Dade County
- Platforms: 1 island platform
- Tracks: 2
- Connections: Metrobus: 3, 100, 203

Construction
- Accessible: Yes

History
- Opened: April 17, 1986

Services
Preceding station	Miami-Dade Transit	Following station
Knight Center One-way operation	Omni Loop	First Street toward School Board
Knight Center One-way operation	Brickell Loop	First Street toward Financial District
Knight Center Next clockwise	Inner Loop	First Street One-way operation
Location

Bayfront Park is a Metromover station in Downtown, Miami, Florida, adjacent to Bayfront Park.

This station is located at the intersection of Southeast Second Street and Biscayne Boulevard (US 1), opening to service April 17, 1986.

The station sees very heavy ridership during special events such as New Year's Eve, when service is extended to 2 a.m. In terms of average weekday traffic, Bayfront Park and Brickell stations are the busiest stations on the Metromover after Government Center.

== Places of interest ==
- Hotel Intercontinental
- Bayfront Park
- Miami Center
- One Bayfront Plaza
- One Biscayne Tower
- Southeast Financial Center
- One Miami
- 50 Biscayne
- Atrium Tower
- Met 3
- Met 1
- Edward Ball Center
- Met 2/JW Marriott
