= Knight Center =

Knight Center may refer to:

- Knight Center (Metromover station), a mass transit station in Miami, Florida, United States
- The Knight Center for Journalism in the Americas, a research unit at the University of Texas at Austin's Moody College of Communication which focuses on promoting journalism in Central America and South America
- The Knight Center for Specialized Journalism, a national program in the United States which offers free seminars for reporters, editors, and editorial writers
- The James L. Knight International Center, an entertainment and convention complex in Miami, Florida, United States
- The John S. Knight Center, a convocation center in Akron, Ohio, United States
