= Third Street station (Miami) =

Miami Metromover station

Third Street
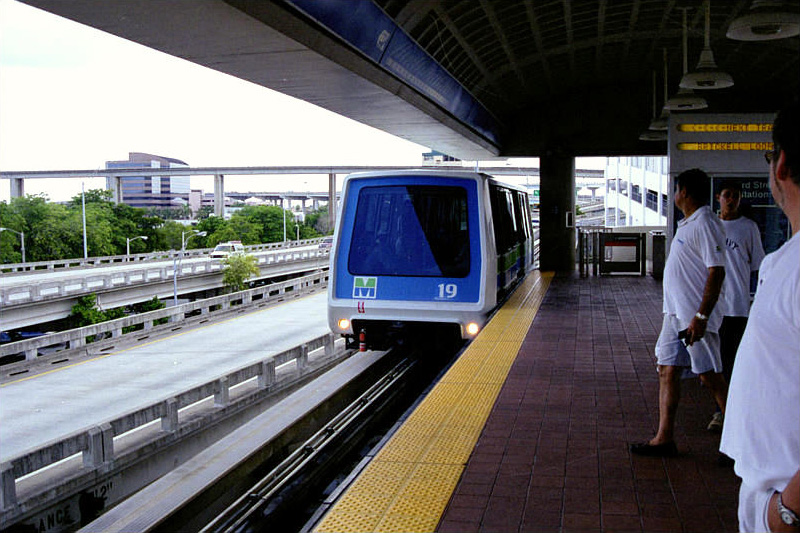
- Brickell Loop train arriving at Third Street, with Metrorail trackage visible in the background.

General information
- Location: 250 South Miami Avenue; Miami, Florida
- Coordinates: 25°46′19″N 80°11′36″W
- Owner: Miami-Dade County
- Platforms: 1 side platform
- Tracks: 1

Construction
- Accessible: Yes

History
- Opened: April 17, 1986
- Former names: Fort Dallas Park

Services
Preceding station	Miami-Dade Transit	Following station
Knight Center toward School Board	Omni Loop	Government Center One-way operation
Riverwalk toward Financial District	Brickell Loop	Government Center One-way operation
Location

Third Street station is a Metromover station in Downtown, Miami, Florida. It is located over South Miami Avenue south of Southwest 3rd Street adjacent to the Downtown Distributor freeway. The station opened as Fort Dallas Park on April 17, 1986, as part of the initial segment of the station.
