= Citigroup Center (Miami) =

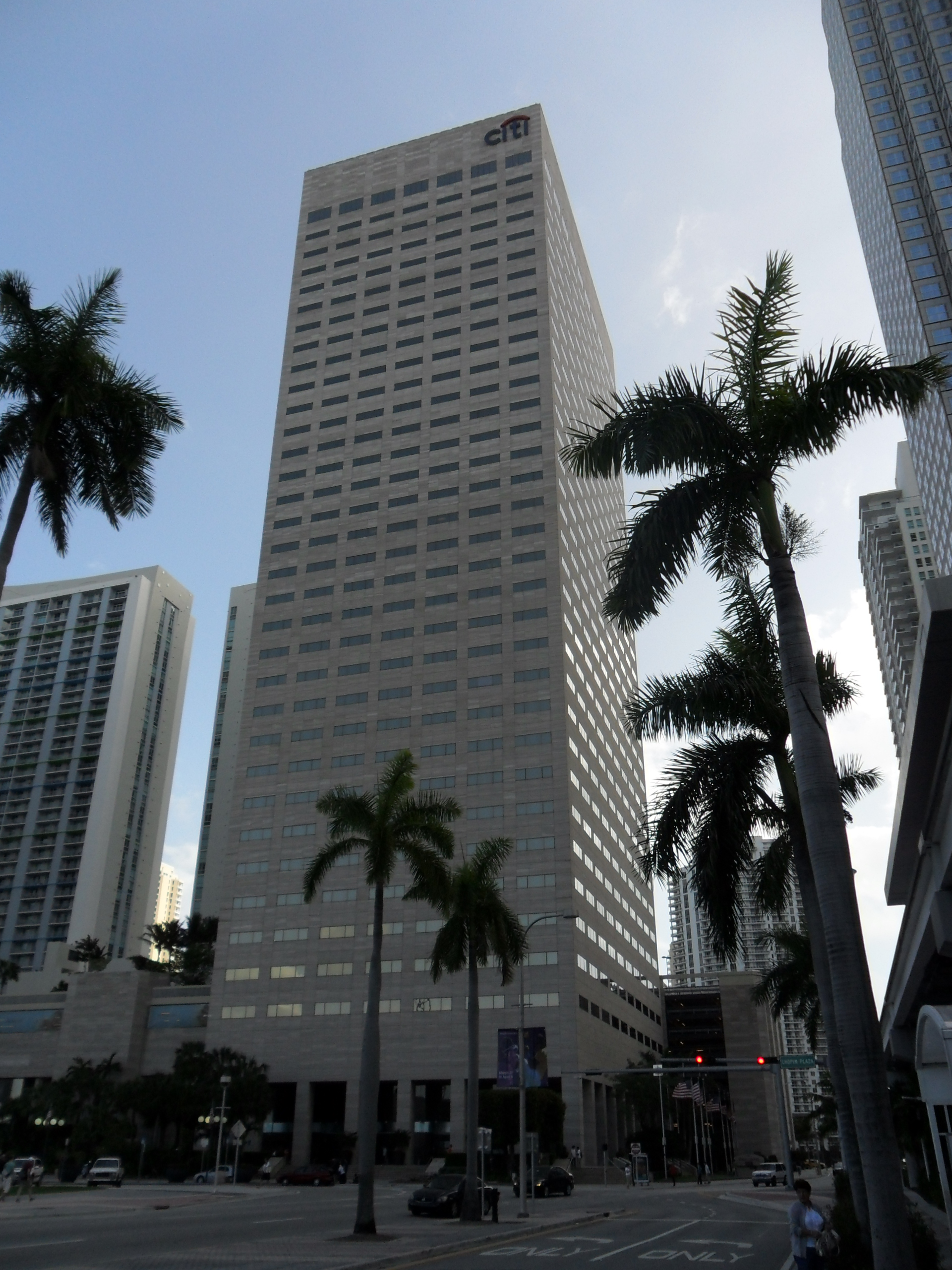
- As seen from Biscayne Boulevard.
- Interactive map of the Citigroup Center area
- Former names: Miami Center

General information
- Type: Office
- Location: 201 S. Biscayne Blvd, Miami, Florida, United States
- Coordinates: 25.77222°N 80.186748°W
- Construction started: 1980
- Completed: 1983
- Opening: 1983

Height
- Roof: 484 ft (148 m)

Technical details
- Floor count: 34
- Floor area: 782,676 sq ft (72,713.0 m^{2})
- Lifts/elevators: 16

Design and construction
- Architect: Pietro Belluschi

Citigroup Center (formerly Miami Center) is an office skyscraper located at 201 South Biscayne Boulevard in Downtown Miami, Florida. Although Miami Center is not the city's tallest building, it is a symbol of an earlier downtown. Built in 1983, it is older than most of the taller buildings in Miami, which were built in the last decade. In addition, the Miami Center is immediately adjacent to Bayfront Park, and is unobstructed when looking at the skyline from Miami Beach to the east. The building is 484 ft (148 m) tall and has 34 floors. It is located in Miami's Central Business District on Biscayne Boulevard and Southeast 3rd Street, adjacent to the Southeast Financial Center and the Hotel Intercontinental. The Bayfront Park Metro Station is also located close to the building. The tower consists of 100% office space.

== Notable Tenants ==
- Black Srebnick Kornspan and Stumpf, PA - Roy Black, Esq., and his firm were one of the first tenants of The Miami Center, relocating their office from another Downtown Miami office building to the brand-new Miami Center in 1983. Roy Black, Esq. is an attorney, known for representing such high-profile clients as William Kennedy Smith, Rush Limbaugh, Kelsey Grammer and Indy 500 and Dancing With the Stars champion Hélio Castroneves.
- Stanford Financial Group (Floors 21, 26, and 27) - It was the site of R. Allen Stanford's first office.
- VITAS Healthcare leased 23,500 square feet (2,180 m^{2}) of space in the Miami Center in 2013. VITAS was the long-time anchor tenant of the neighboring Bayfront Plaza, which will be demolished to make room for One Bayfront Plaza.

== Gallery ==
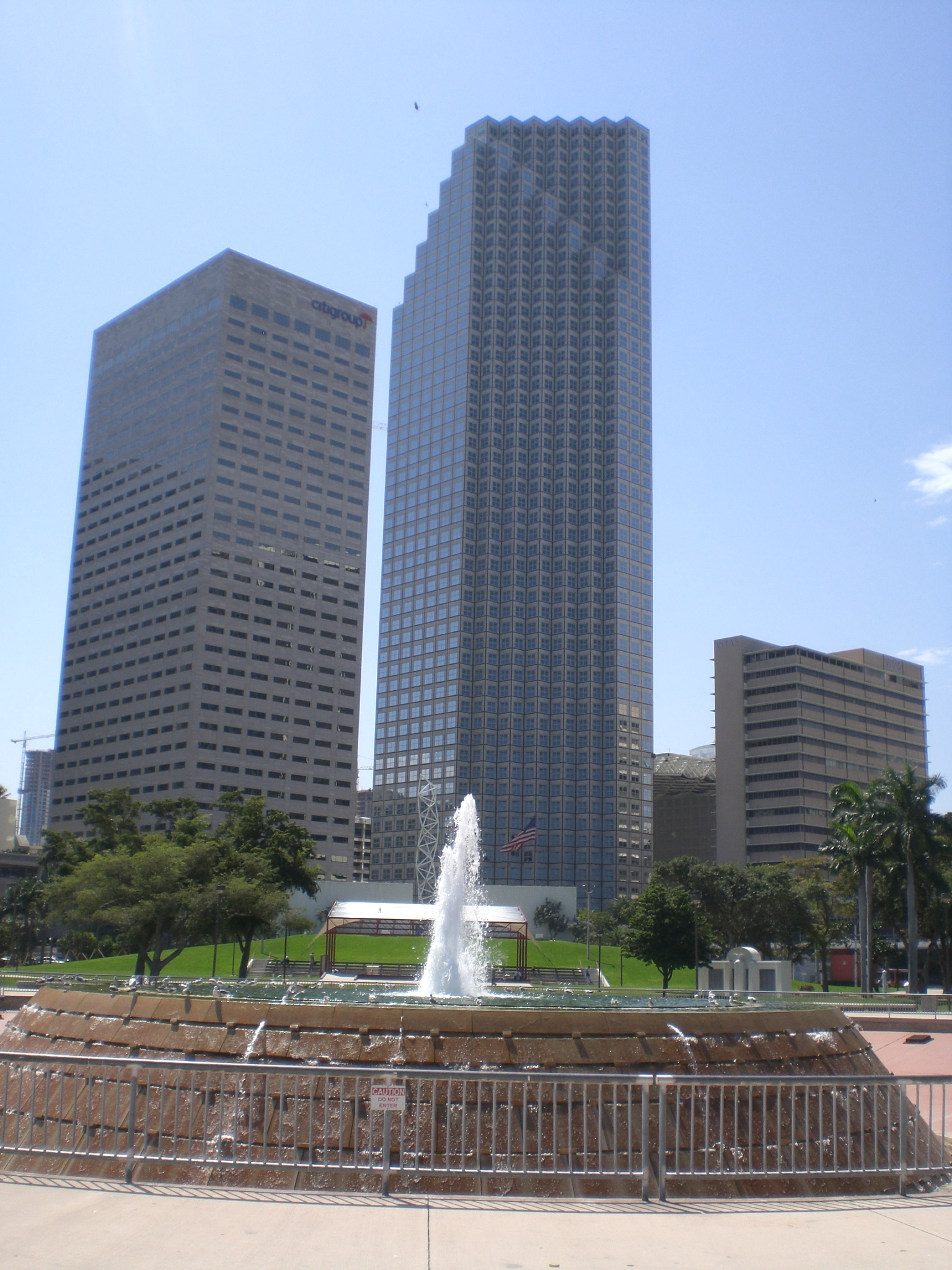
Miami Center (building on the left) next to the Southeast Financial Center from Bayfront Park

== See also ==
- List of tallest buildings in Miami
