= Riverwalk station =

Miami Metromover station

Riverwalk
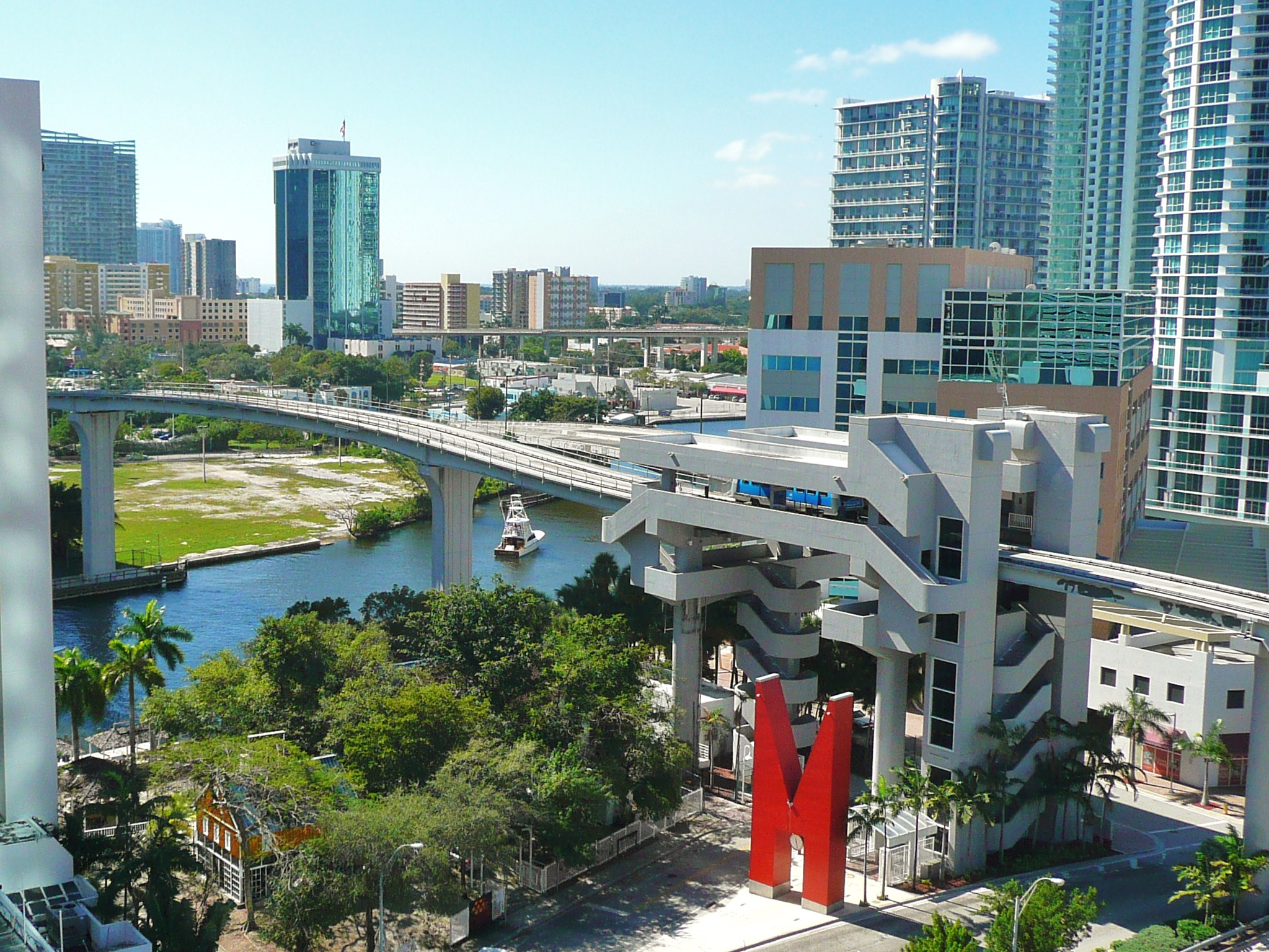
- The station, as seen from the Southeast Financial Center tower

General information
- Location: 88 SE Fourth Street; Miami, Florida 33131
- Coordinates: 25°46′15″N 80°11′33″W
- Owner: Miami-Dade County
- Platforms: 2 side platforms
- Tracks: 2

Construction
- Accessible: Yes

History
- Opened: May 26, 1994

Services
Preceding station	Miami-Dade Transit	Following station
Fifth Street toward Financial District	Brickell Loop	Third Street One-way operation
Fifth Street toward Financial District	Brickell Loop	Knight Center toward Downtown
Location

Riverwalk is a Metromover station in Downtown, Miami, Florida near the northern banks of the Miami River and adjacent to the Miami Riverwalk.

This station is located on Southeast Fourth Street just east of First Avenue. It opened to service May 26, 1994. The red "M" placed as an entranceway to the station was designed by Roberto Behar and Rosario Marquardt.
