= Knight Center Complex =

Venue in Miami, Florida, United States

James L. Knight Center
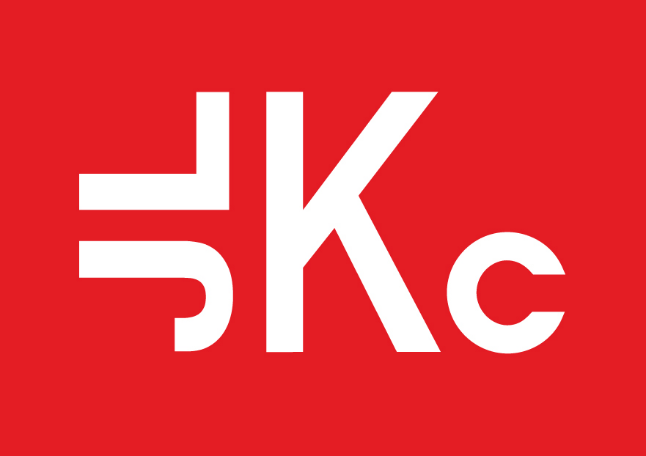
- Interactive map of James L. Knight Center
- Former names: James L. Knight Convention Center (1982–86); James L. Knight International Center (1986–2013)
- Address: 400 SE Second Avenue
- Location: Miami, Florida, U.S.
- Coordinates: 25°46′15″N 80°11′28″W
- Owner: City of Miami
- Operator: Legends Global

Construction
- Opened: October 2, 1982; 44 years ago
- Renovated: 1997, 2005
- Expanded: 1986
- Cost: ~$10 million

Tenants
- Miami Hurricanes (NCAA) (1985–88); FIU Panthers (NCAA) (1983–86)

Website
- jlkc.com

The James L. Knight Center is a contemporary entertainment and convention complex located in Downtown Miami, Florida. Located within the Miami Central Business District, the venue opened in 1982. The complex is named after famed newspaper publisher, James L. Knight. Since its opening, the complex has hosted many business, entertainment and political events. Annually, it hosts Miami Dade College graduation ceremonies. It also hosted Miss Universe in 1984 and 1985, Miss USA in 1986 and Miss Teen USA in 1985 and the OTI Festival 1989. CONMEBOL Copa America 2024™ Final Draw. Latin Billboards in 2025 and 2026.

== History ==
The complex originally was built to be an exhibition hall for the downtown Miami area, to attract business conferences, trade shows and conventions. Previous conventions were held at the Miami Beach Convention Center. However, the business atmosphere for Miami Beach began to decline. City officials saw this as an opportunity to claim the market for the blossoming downtown business district. The space, known as James L. Knight Convention Center, was the project of the City of Miami. During its construction, the University of Miami sought a sports arena for its revitalized basketball program. Newspaper publisher James L. Knight donated over one million dollars towards the cost of the arena. The space became known as the University of Miami Auditorium.

Along with the Hyatt Regency Hotel, the complex opened October 2, 1982, to the public. Although this venture was promising for the city government, it proved to be very costly. Although the center hosted many events, it was not able to draw large convention crowds due to its limited size. The venue began to accumulate debt for the county and city officials were unsure of how to solve the problem. Taxes were increased to handle the $5 million annual operating costs and debt for the venue. In 1983, the FIU Sunblazers men's and women's basketball team used the UM Auditorium until the completion of the Sunblazer Arena in 1986. Shortly after, the newly reestablished Miami Hurricanes men's basketball team occupied the auditorium and the center was revitalized.

To meet demand, the city looked to expand the Knight Center to be used for large conventions, which would not only gain higher revenue for the city, but also solve the city's growing unemployment issue. Concurrently, the University of Miami were also looking to build upon the athletic success of the auditorium by adding a public meeting space and lecture hall. During this time, the auditorium hosted many events, including the NWA Wrestling's Clash of the Champions televised event in June 1988 and two concert appearances for the band R.E.M.

The Knight Center became used primarily for concerts when the Hurricanes moved into Miami Arena in 1988, and became the original home of the annual Premios Lo Nuestro ceremony in the 1990s, remaining until the ceremony moved into the newly completed Waterfront Theater at American Airlines Arena in 2000.

In February 1994 the game show Wheel of Fortune taped episodes at the Knight Center. 7 years later in November 2001 Wheel of Fortune would again tape at the Knight Center; however, the audience size was reduced following the September 11 attacks.

On July 7, 2021, professional wrestling promotion All Elite Wrestling (AEW) hosted a special episode of their weekly television show AEW Dynamite called Road Rager at the arena. AEW would return to the Knight Center in October 2021 to tape another episode of Dynamite and two episodes of its other weekly television show, AEW Rampage.

== Facilities ==
- James L. Knight Center Theater (formerly the James L. Knight Center from 1982 to 2013)
  - Miami Convention Center
    - Riverfront Exhibition Hall
      - North Hall
        - Central Hall
        - South Hall
  - Riverwalk & Dockage
- Miami Conference Center
  - Ashe Auditorium
  - Miami Lecture Hall
- Hyatt Regency Hotel
  - Regency Ballroom
  - Riverwalk Cafe
  - Riverwalk Deli
  - Pure Verde

== Location ==
The complex is located along the Miami River near Bayfront Park. Also in the area is Mary Brickell Village, Gusman Center for the Performing Arts and New World School of the Arts. The complex is serviced by the Knight Center station for the Metromover.

== Venue Gallery ==
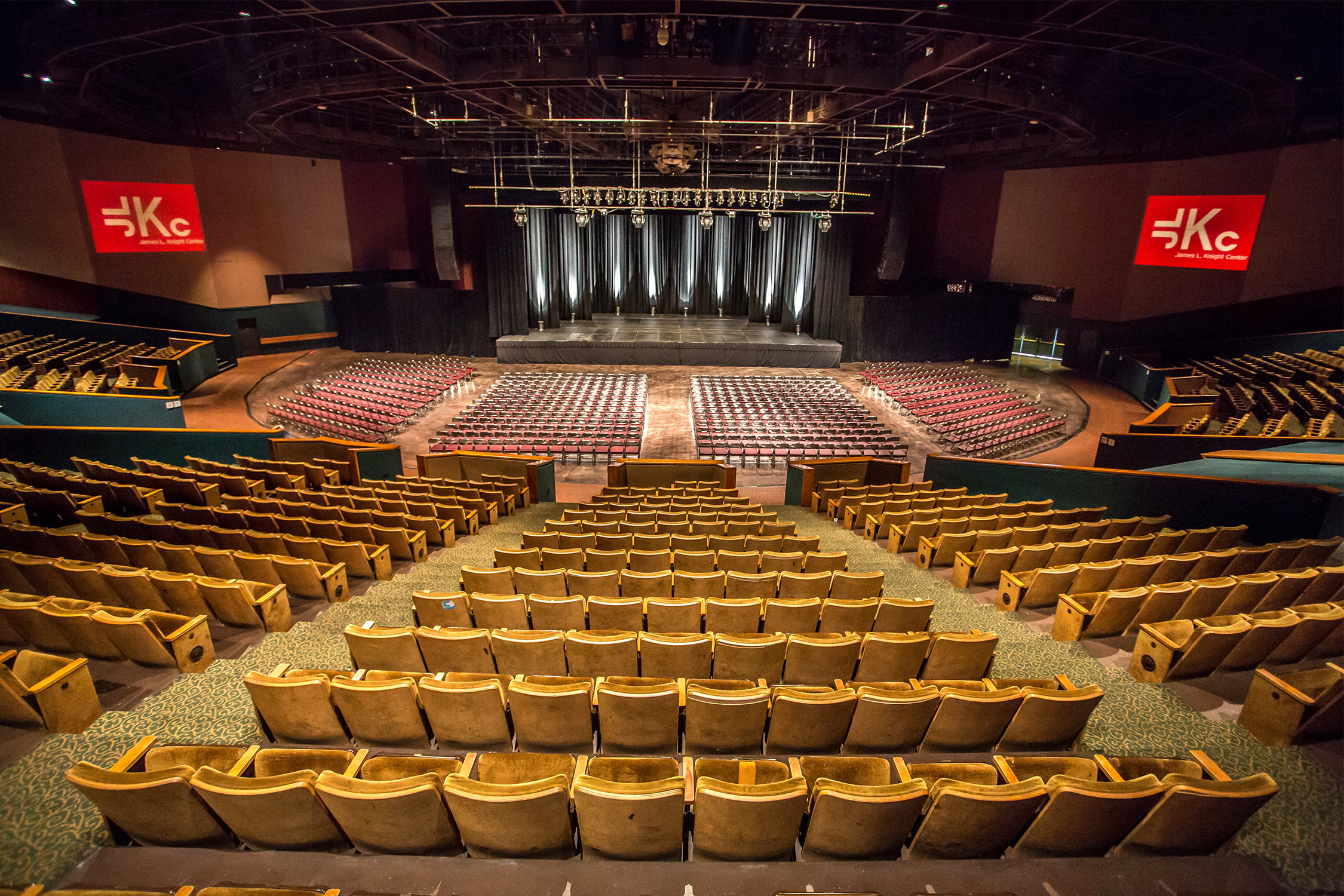
James L. Knight Center Theater - Front View

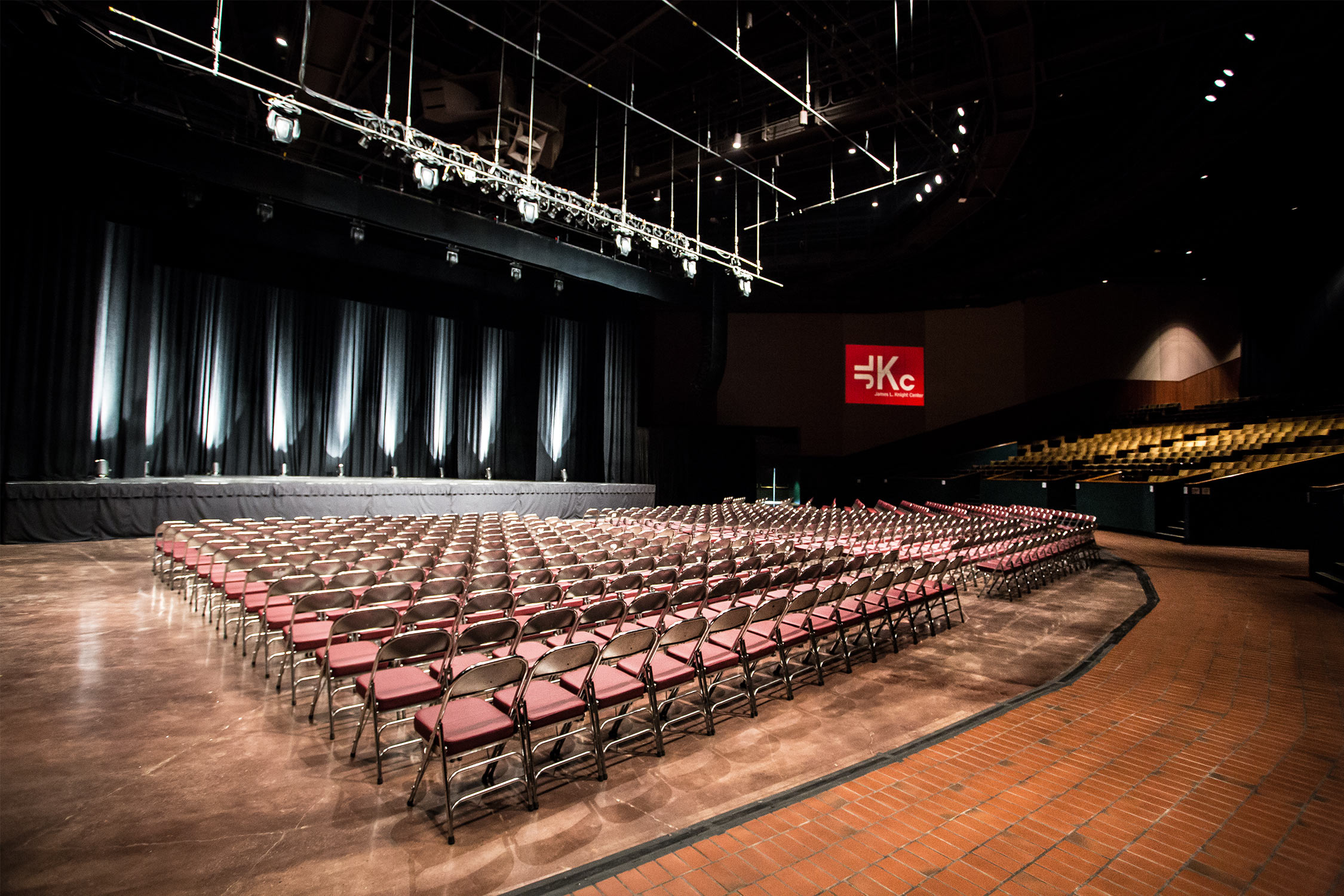
James L. Knight Center Theater - Floor View

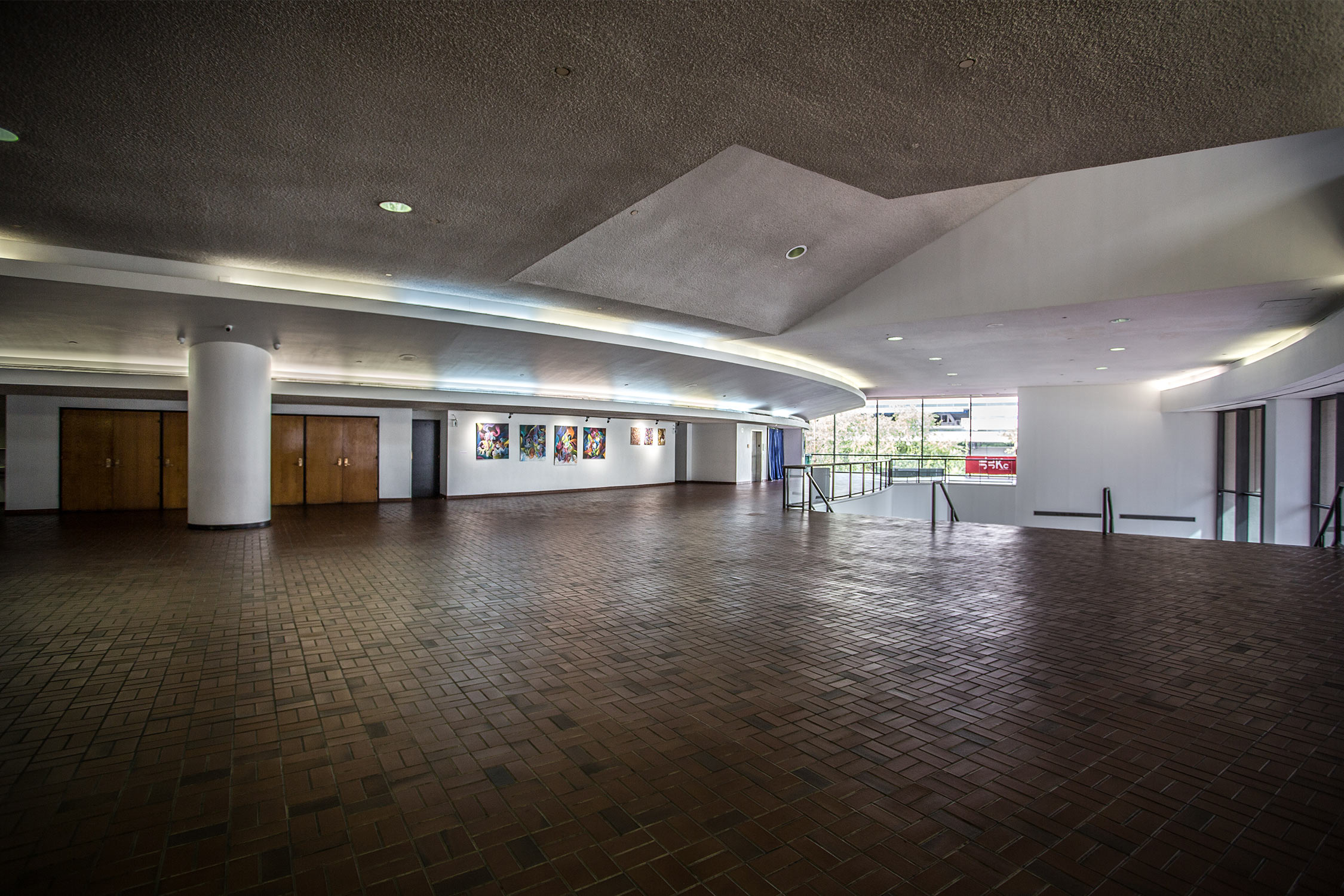
James L. Knight Center Theater Lobby

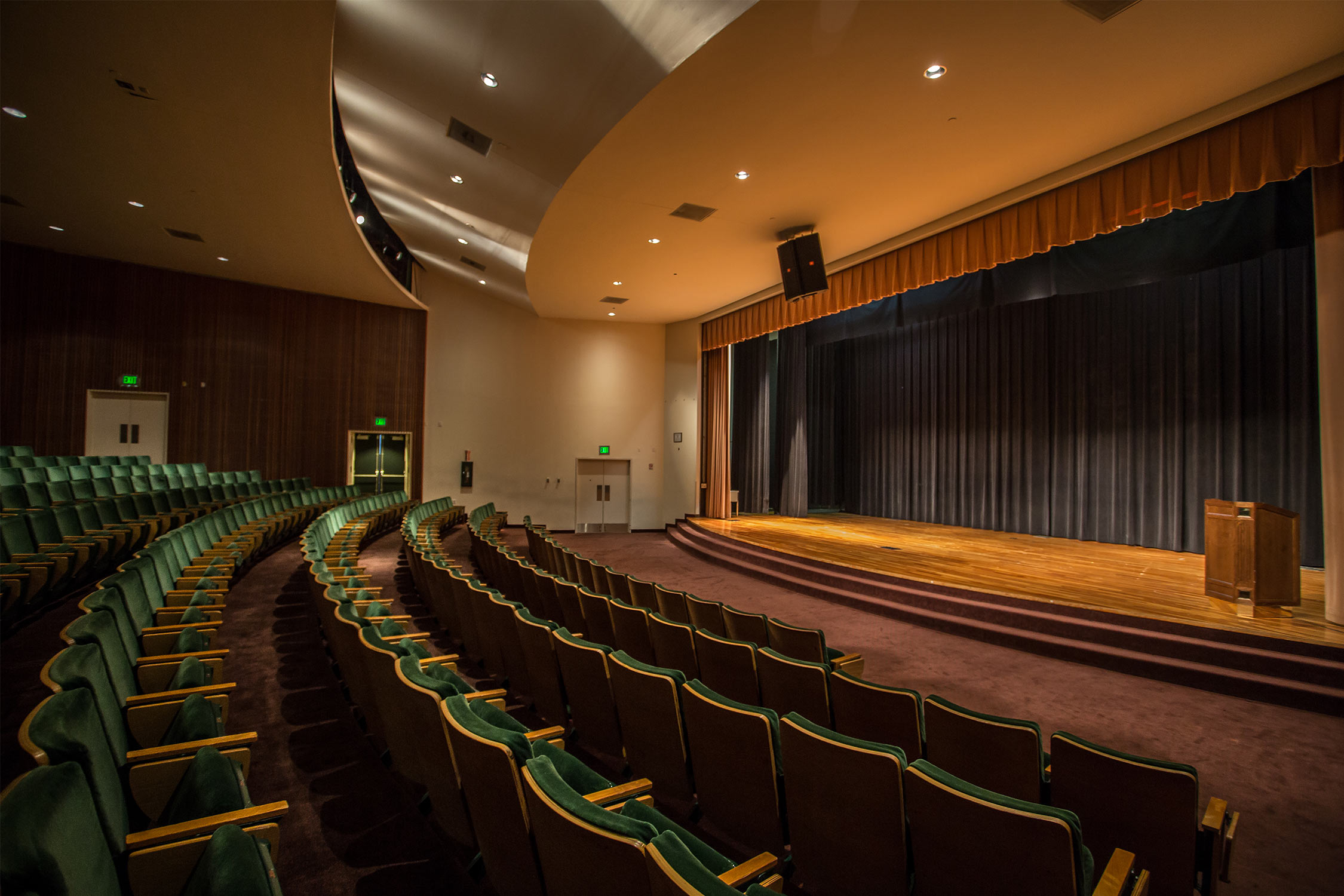
Ashe Auditorium at the James L. Knight Center

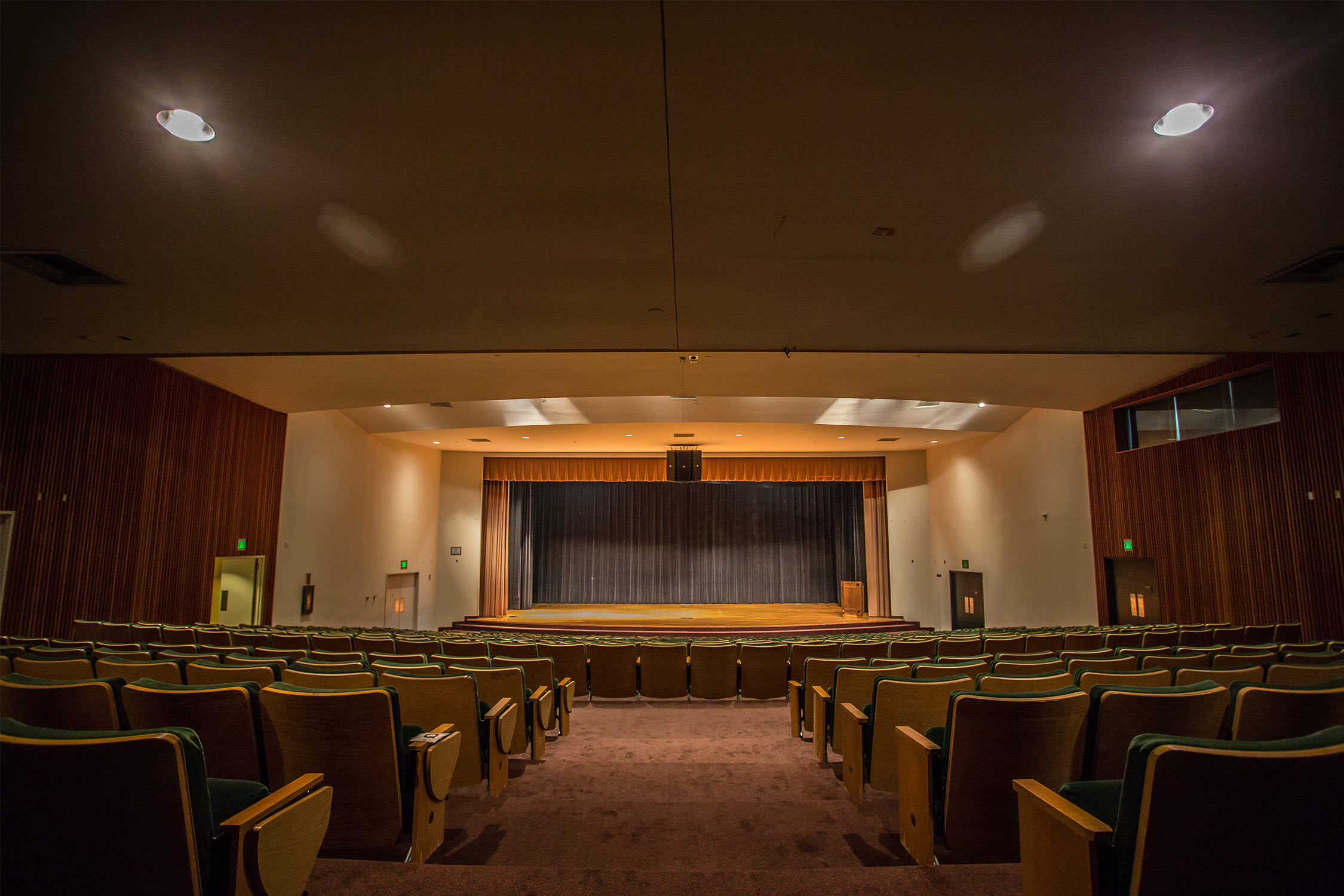
Ashe Auditorium at the James L. Knight Center

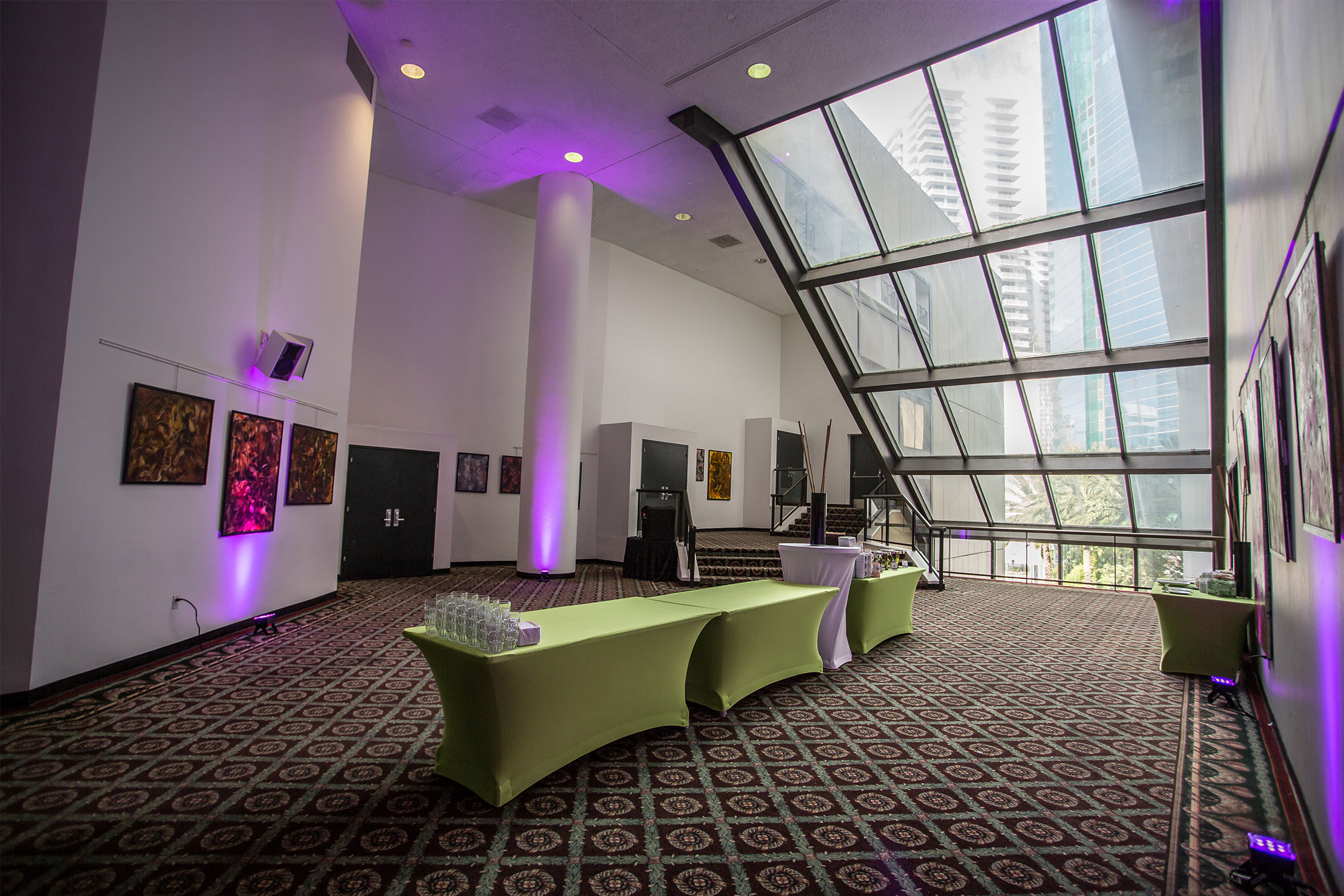
Ashe Auditorium Lobby at the James L. Knight Center

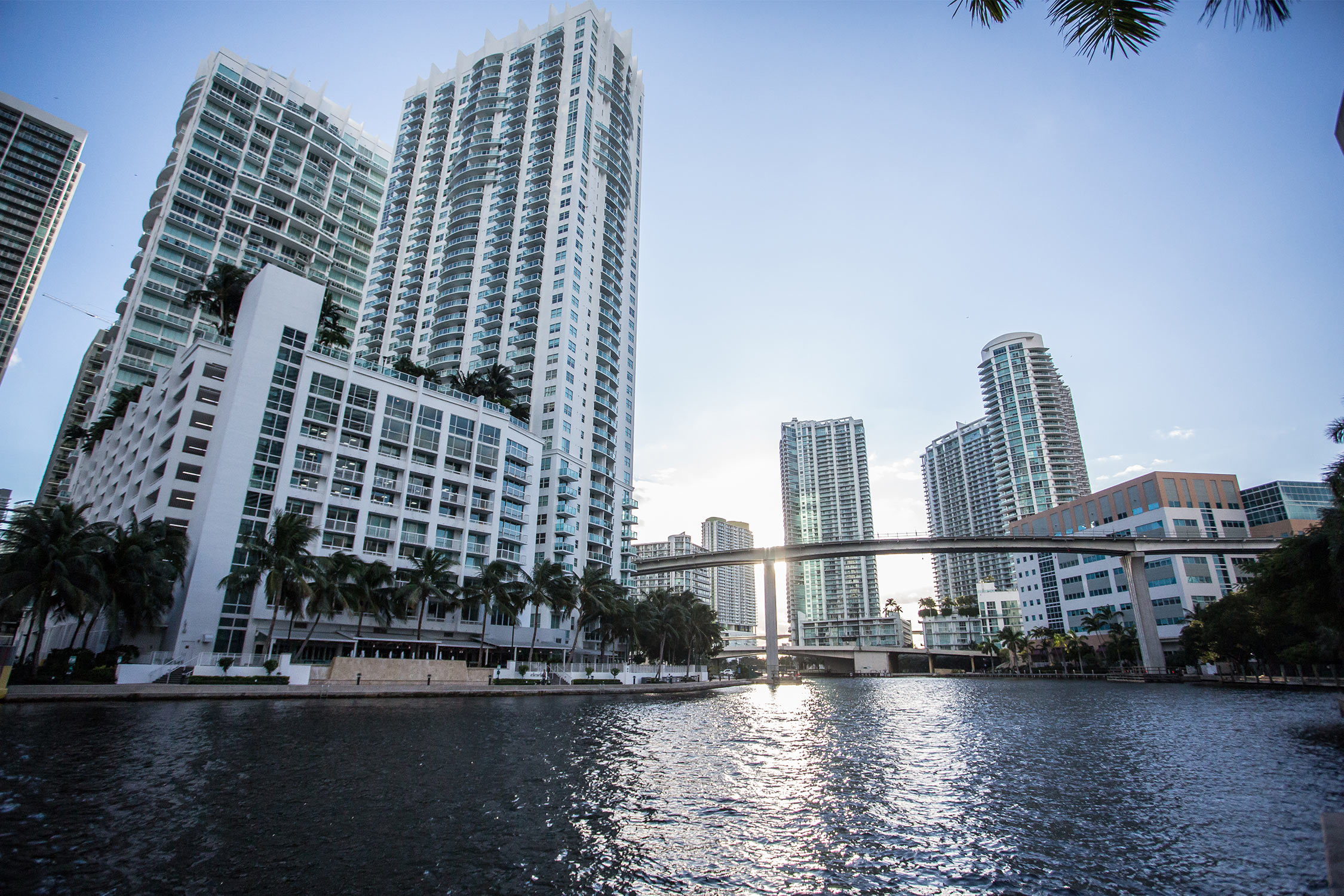
Riverwalk & Dockage View at the James L. Knight Center

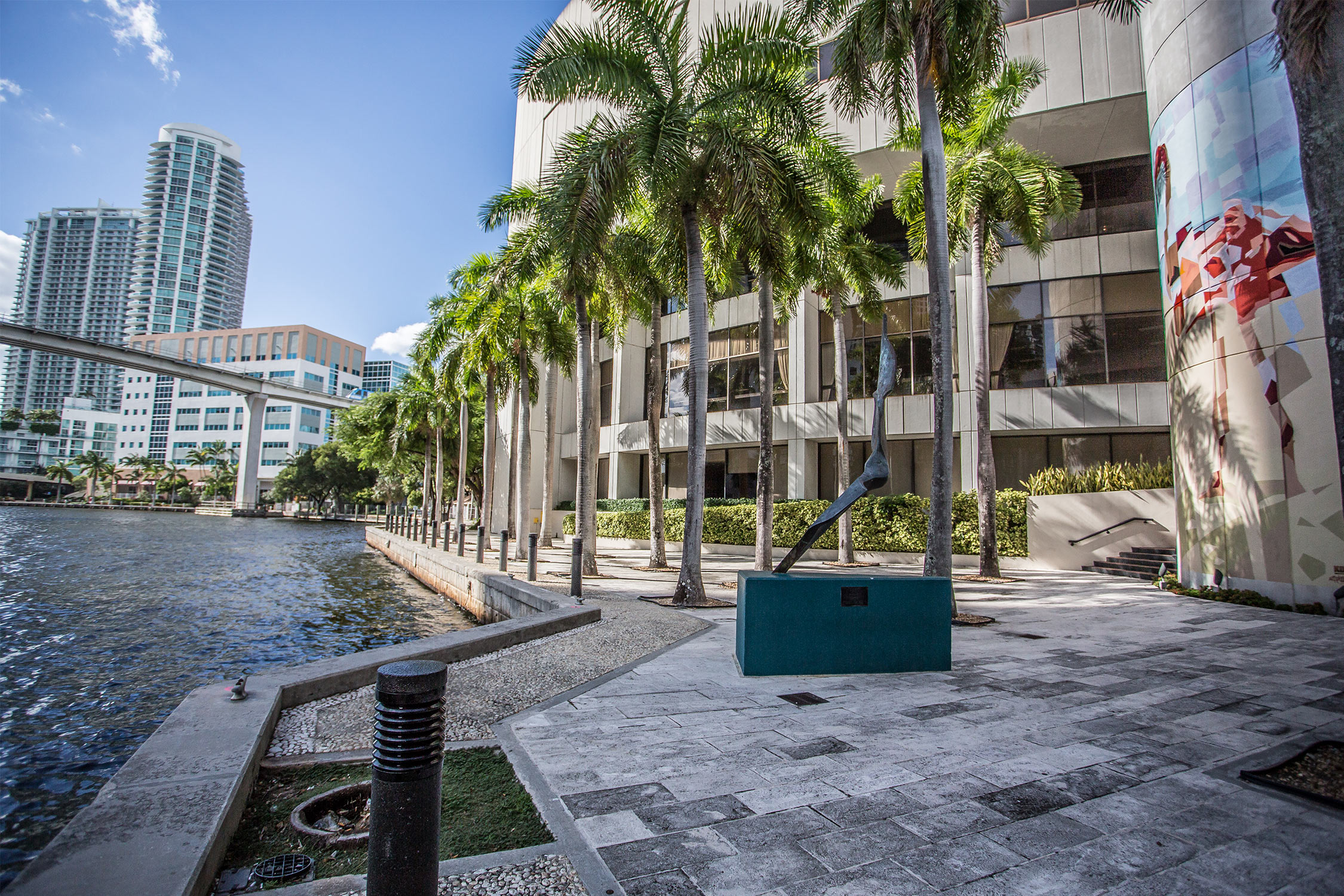
Riverwalk & Dockage View at the James L. Knight Center

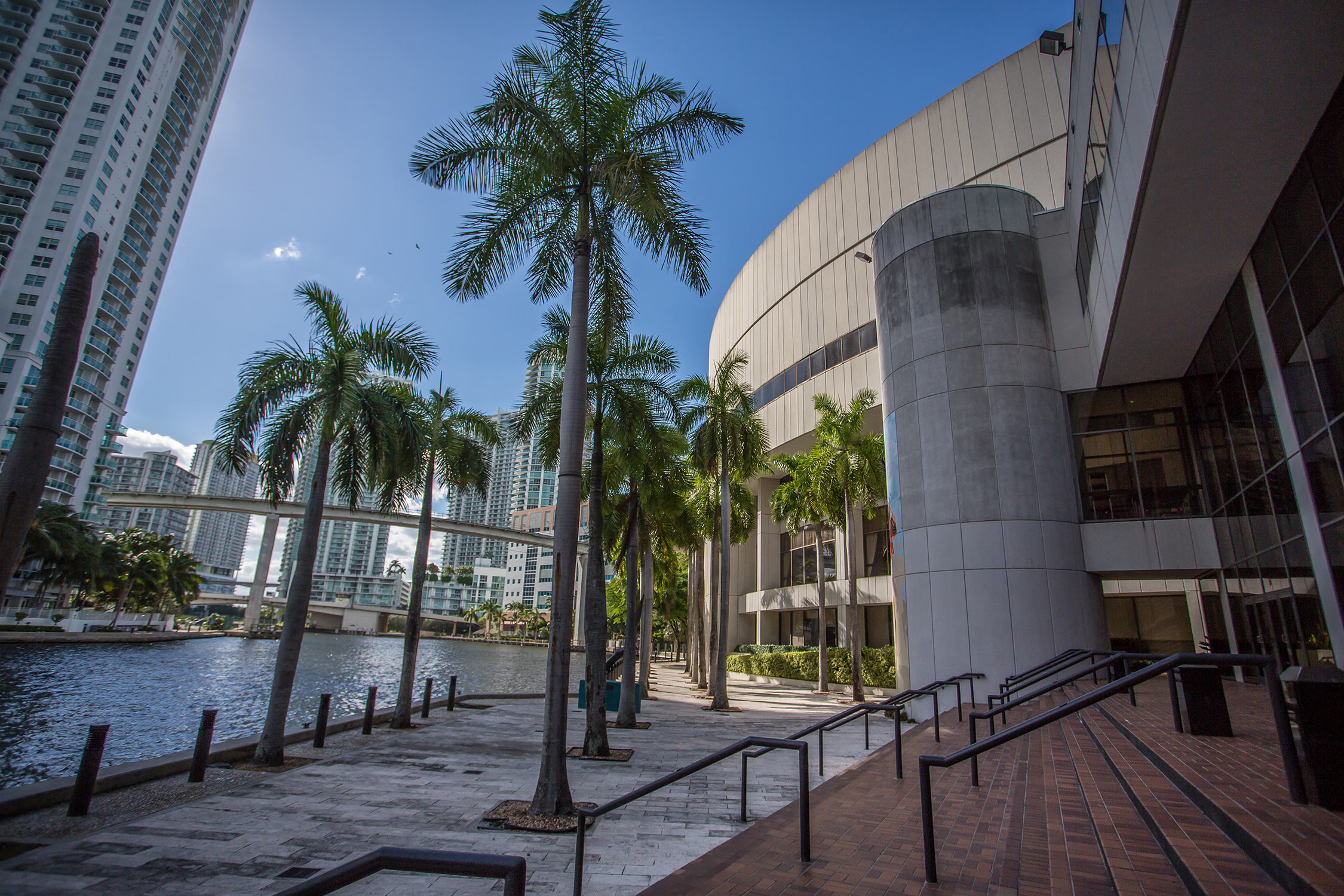
Riverwalk & Dockage at the James L. Knight Center

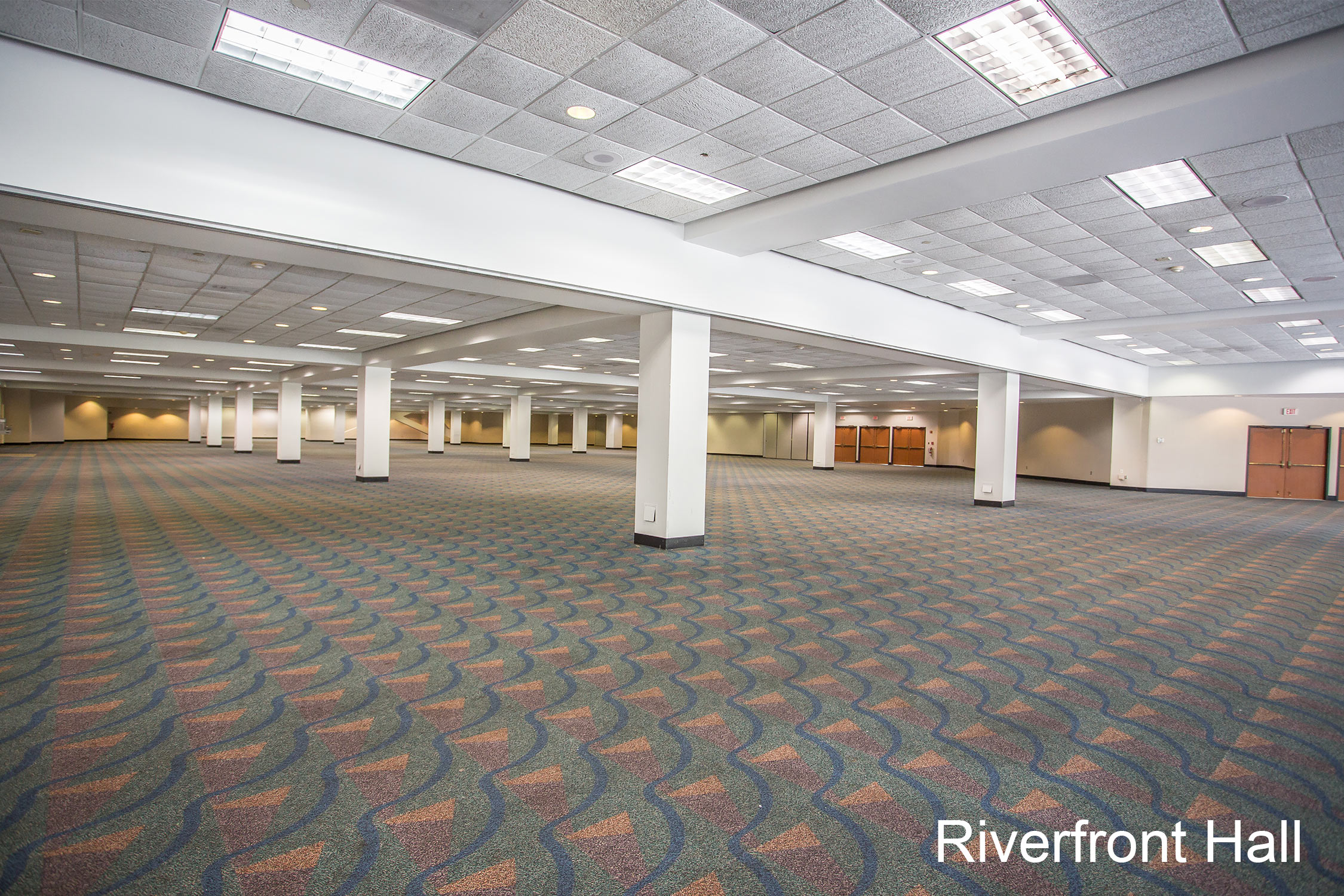
Riverfront Hall at James L. Knight Center - Miami Convention Center

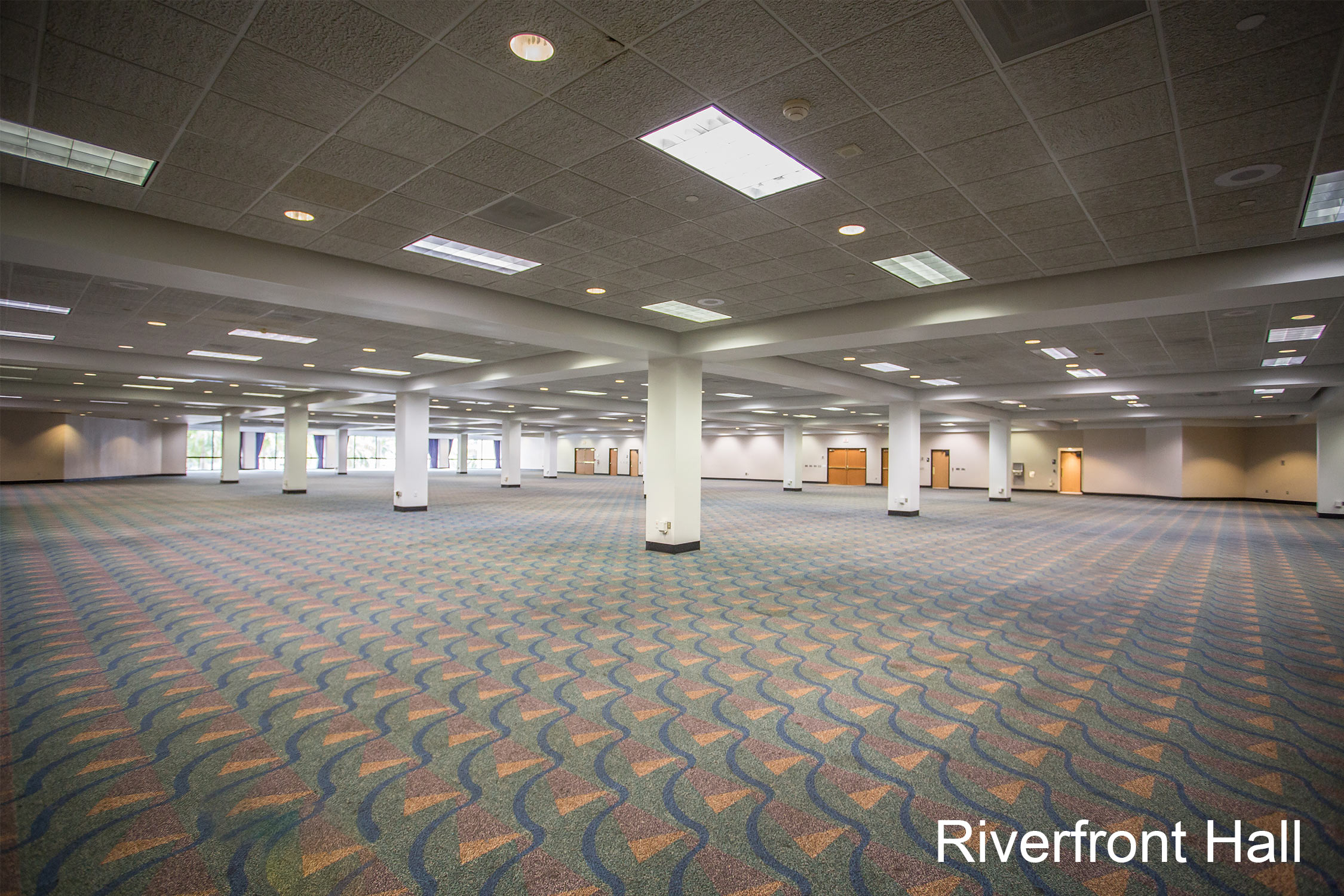
Riverfront Hall at James L. Knight Center - Miami Convention Center

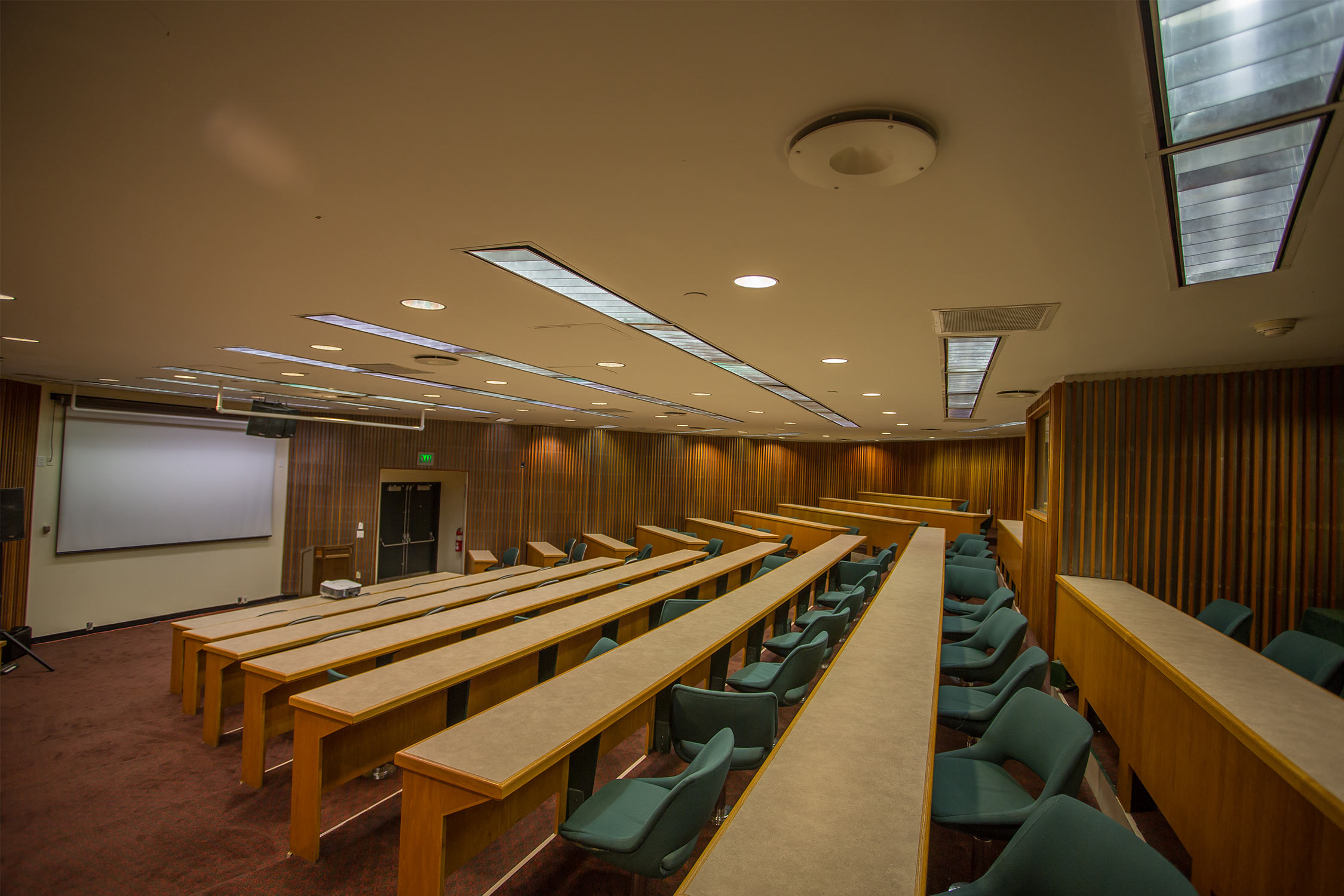
Miami Lecture Hall at the James L. Knight Center

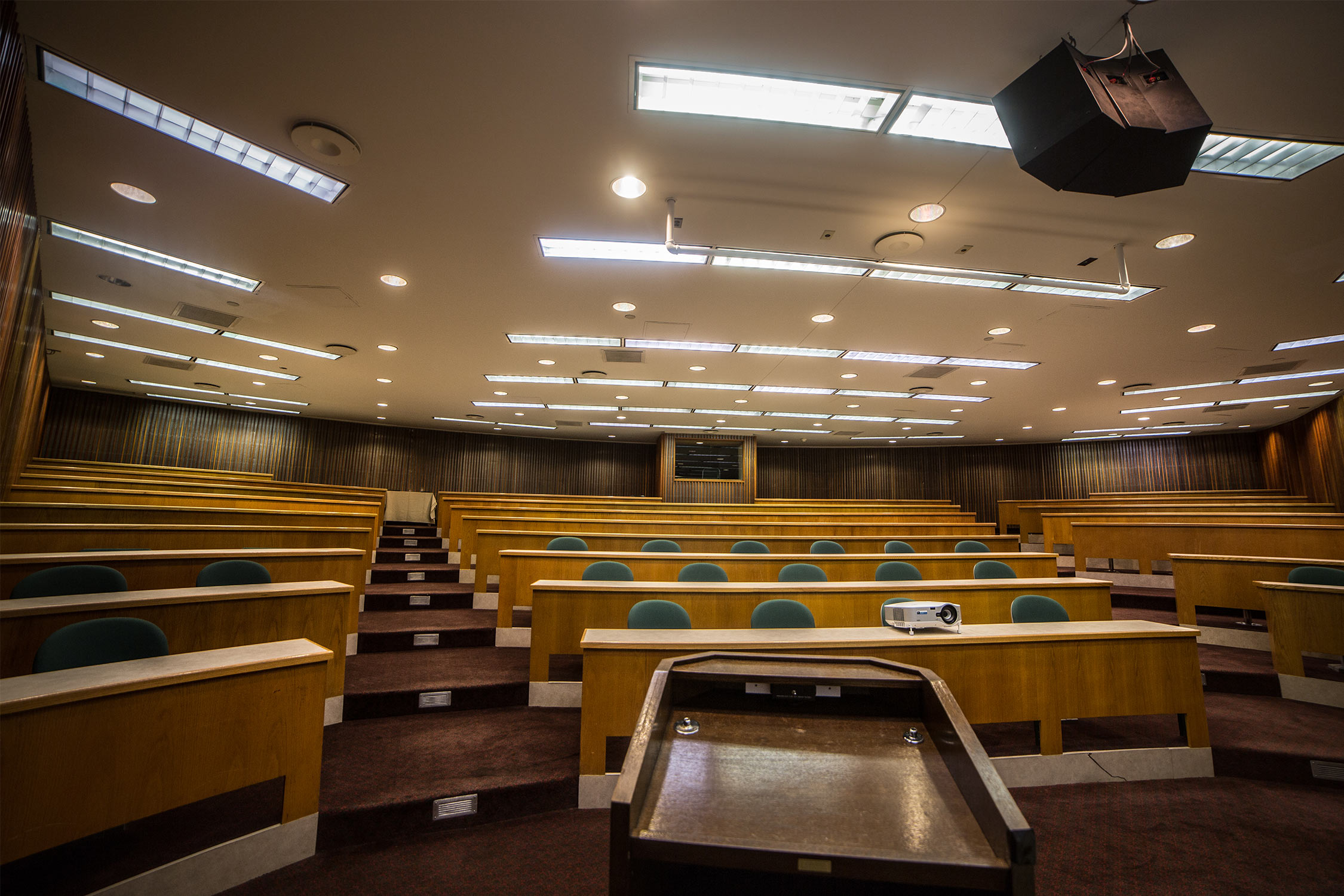
Miami Lecture Hall at the James L. Knight Center

== See also ==
- List of convention centers in the United States

Preceded by Kiel Auditorium (United States) St. Louis, MO	Miss Universe venue 1984–1985	Succeeded by Atlapa Convention Centre; Panama City
