= Tenth Street Promenade station =

Miami Metromover station

Tenth Street Promenade
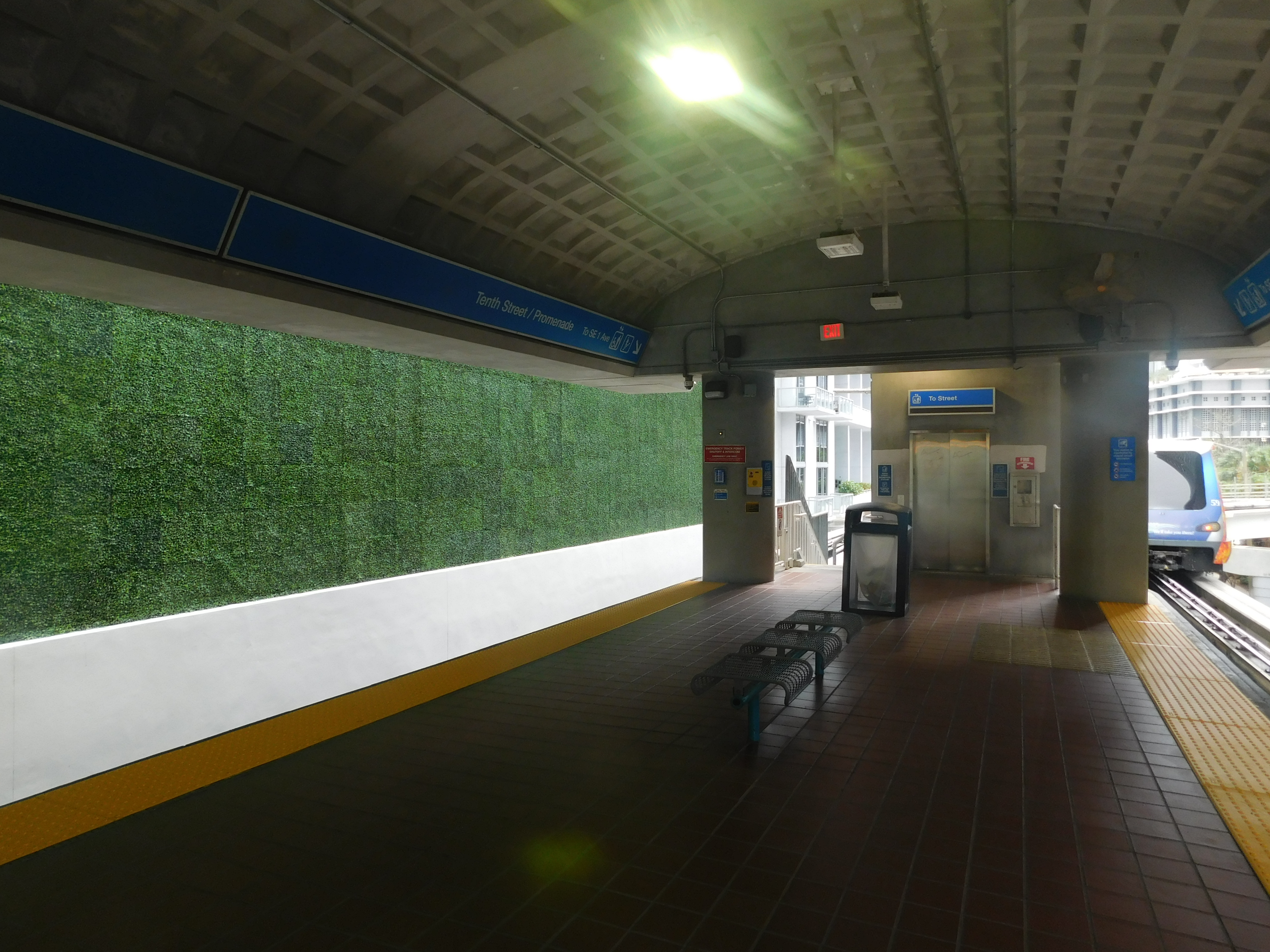
- Tenth Street Promenade station in 2020

General information
- Location: 1011 SW First Avenue; Miami, Florida
- Coordinates: 25°45′50″N 80°11′33″W
- Owner: Miami-Dade County
- Platforms: 1 island platform
- Tracks: 2

Construction
- Accessible: Yes

History
- Opened: May 26, 1994

Services
| Preceding station | Miami-Dade Transit | Following station |
|---|---|---|
| Brickell toward Financial District | Brickell Loop | Brickell City Centre toward Downtown |
Location

Tenth Street Promenade station is a Metromover station in the Brickell district of Miami, Florida. The station is located over Southwest First Avenue (Brickell Plaza) and between Southeast 10th Street and Southeast 11th Street. It opened on May 26, 1994, as part of the Omni extension.
