= Bayfront Park =

Urban park in Miami, Florida, US

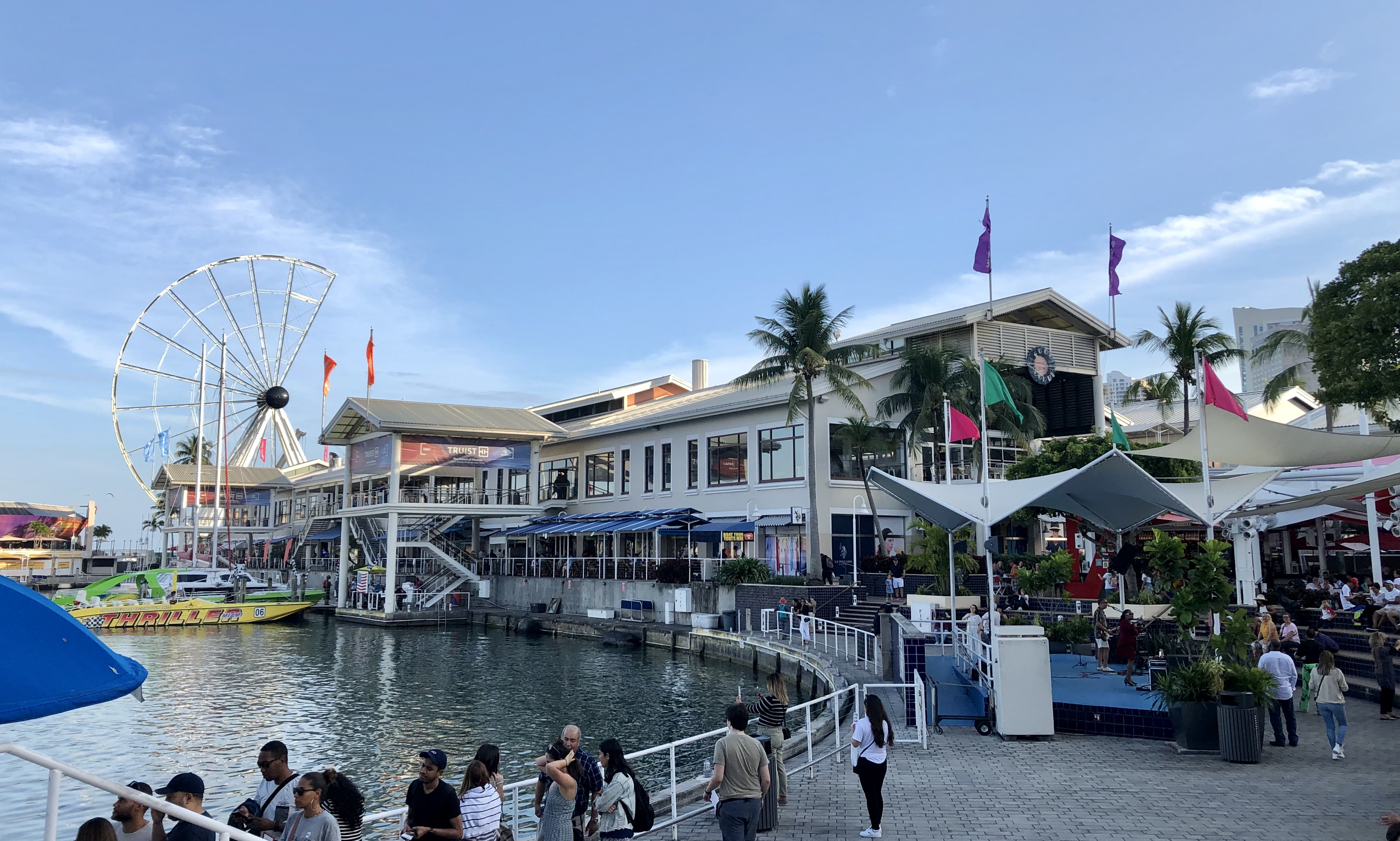
- Bayfront Park and Plaza in February 2020, with the Ferris wheel under construction
- Interactive map of Bayfront Park
- Type: Municipal
- Location: Downtown, Miami, Florida, United States
- Coordinates: 25.775°N 80.186°W
- Area: 32 acres (13 ha)
- Created: 1925
- Operator: Bayfront Park Management Trust
- Status: Completed
- Public transit: Bayfront Park (Metromover station)

Bayfront Park is a 32-acre (13 ha) public, urban park in the Central Business District of Downtown Miami, Florida on Biscayne Bay.

== History ==
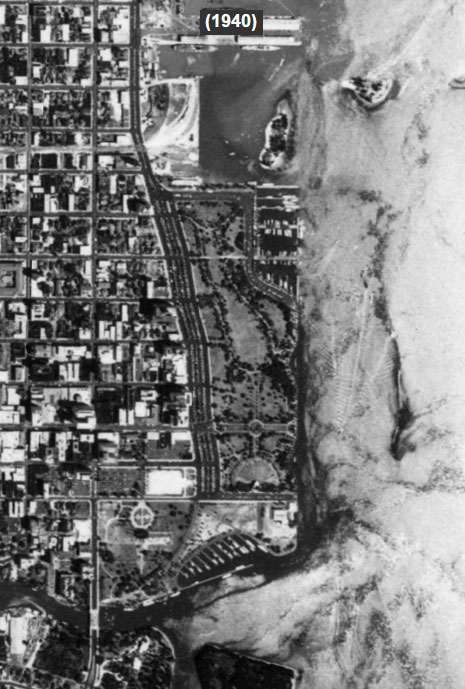
Historic aerial photograph of Bayfront Park in 1940

The park began construction in 1924 under the design plans of Warren Henry Manning and officially opened in March 1925. Beginning in 1980, it underwent a major redesign by Japanese-American modernist artist and landscape architect, Isamu Noguchi. Today, Bayfront Park is maintained by the Bayfront Park Management Trust, a limited agency of the city of Miami, Florida.

Bayfront Park is bordered on the north by Bayside Marketplace and the Kaseya Center, on the south by Chopin Plaza, on the west by Biscayne Boulevard and on the east by Biscayne Bay. Bayfront Park is host to many large events such as the New Year's ball drop at the InterContinental Miami, Christmas celebrations, concerts, the Bayfront Park Amphitheater, and the Tina Hills Pavilion, as well as boat tours around Biscayne Bay.

Seven blocks north is Bayfront Park's partner park, the 30-acre (0.12 km^{2}) Museum Park, location of the Pérez Art Museum Miami and Phillip and Patricia Frost Museum of Science.

In June 2020, the park's Ponce de Leon and Christopher Columbus statues were vandalized, though it was announced that they would not be removed.

=== Site of assassination of Anton Cermak ===
On February 15, 1933, Chicago mayor Anton Cermak was shot three times in the chest and mortally wounded while shaking hands with President-elect Franklin D. Roosevelt in front of Bayfront Park by assassin Giuseppe Zangara. Along with Cermak, who died of his wounds 19 days later on March 6, 1933 (two days after the inauguration of FDR), four other people were hit by the gunman. A serious debate has ensued as to whether Zangara had been actually trying to assassinate Cermak, presumed to have been killed by accident, instead of Roosevelt, however no firm evidence has been found to prove this theory.

=== Columbus statue ===
A bronze statue of Christopher Columbus was placed in the park in 1952, donated by the city's Italian-American community. The statue itself was sculpted by Count Vittorio di Colbertaldo of Verona, one of Benito Mussolini’s hand picked ceremonial bodyguards known as the “Black Musketeers.” Colbertaldo doubled as the Musketeers' sculptor, producing statues which commemorated the organization. On June 10, 2020 the Columbus statue at Bayfront Park was vandalized with red paint, attempting to symbolize spilt blood. The action was carried out by individuals protesting the murder of George Floyd and police brutality.

A second Columbus statue by Colbertaldo was installed at Coit Tower in Pioneer Park in San Francisco, in 1957, and removed in June, 2020.

=== Challenger Memorial ===
The Challenger Memorial is a monument located on the southwest corner of Bayfront Park dedicated to the crew of the Space Shuttle Challenger, which exploded shortly after takeoff on January 28, 1986 in Cape Canaveral, Florida. The memorial was created by the Japanese-American artist Isamu Noguchi, and was dedicated on the second anniversary of the disaster, January 28, 1988. The 100-foot-tall spiraling steel sculpture is shaped as a towering double-helix.

The triangle-shaped plaque at the base, made of granite, has an engraved poem by Michael McClure inscribed, as well as the last names of the seven crew members who died.

=== The torch of Friendship ===
The Torch of Friendship is a monument located on Biscayne Boulevard in at the northwest corner of Bayfront Park.

Built in 1960, the Torch of Friendship was built to signify the passageway for immigrants coming from Latin America and the Caribbean. The gas fed flame was meant to act as a welcoming beacon for all new and old immigrants to the nation. In 1964 it was re-dedicated to the memory of President John F. Kennedy.

=== Mildred and Claude Pepper Fountain ===
The Mildred and Claude Pepper Fountain is a musical fountain on the eastern side of Bayfront Park. The fountain, which opened in 1990, was an integral component of Noguchi’s redevelopment concept for Bayfront Park. His plan incorporated the fountain alongside an open-air amphitheater and a series of sculptural installations, with the elements intended to establish a tranquil focal point within downtown Miami.

During the following decade, the city reduced the fountain’s operating schedule because of increasing maintenance costs. By 1999, the fountain was operating at approximately half of its original capacity. It subsequently fell into disuse and was briefly adapted in the mid-2000s as a launch site for a privately operated hot-air balloon business. Following this temporary use, the fountain remained inactive for nearly two decades.

A $5.5 million renovation project commenced in July 2024 to restore and modernize the fountain. The upgraded installation incorporates more than 800 synchronized water jets, approximately 500 lights, and a central water screen capable of displaying projected images and video. The original system produced water streams reaching approximately 50 feet (15 m), while the renovated fountain can propel water to heights of up to 150 feet (46 m). The renovated fountain was opened to the public in February 2025.

== Events ==
Bayfront Park holds the city's annual "America's Birthday Bash" on Independence Day, which attracted over 60,000 visitors in 2011. The park also hosts the city's official New Year's Eve party that annually hosts over 70,000 visitors. Visitors are encouraged to take public transport for events at Bayfront Park as parking can be scarce and expensive. The nearest Metrorail station is Government Center. From there a connection to the Metromover is available with three stops near the park, Bayfront Park, First Street, and College/Bayside.

It has been the site of the Ultra Music Festival, an electronic dance music event. In 2018, Miami's commissioners barred the festival from being held downtown, citing complaints surrounding noise and the behavior of attendees, resulting in a relocation to Virginia Key. The festival returned to the park in March 2022.

The park hosted the hip-hop music festival Rolling Loud in 2017. Performers included Kendrick Lamar, Future, Lil Wayne, ASAP Rocky, Travis Scott, Young Thug, and Mac Miller.

Bayfront Park includes an amphitheater with capacity of 10,000 people, in where several cultural events have been held. On pop culture, notably, the Bayfront Park amphitheater was stage for country pop singer Shania Twain during her Come On Over Tour in early 1999, with two shows featuring guests Backstreet Boys, Elton John and Canadian dance group Leahy. A CBS television special was filmed throughout the concerts.

The Miami FIFA Fan Festival for the 2026 FIFA World Cup was held at the park.

== Notable people ==
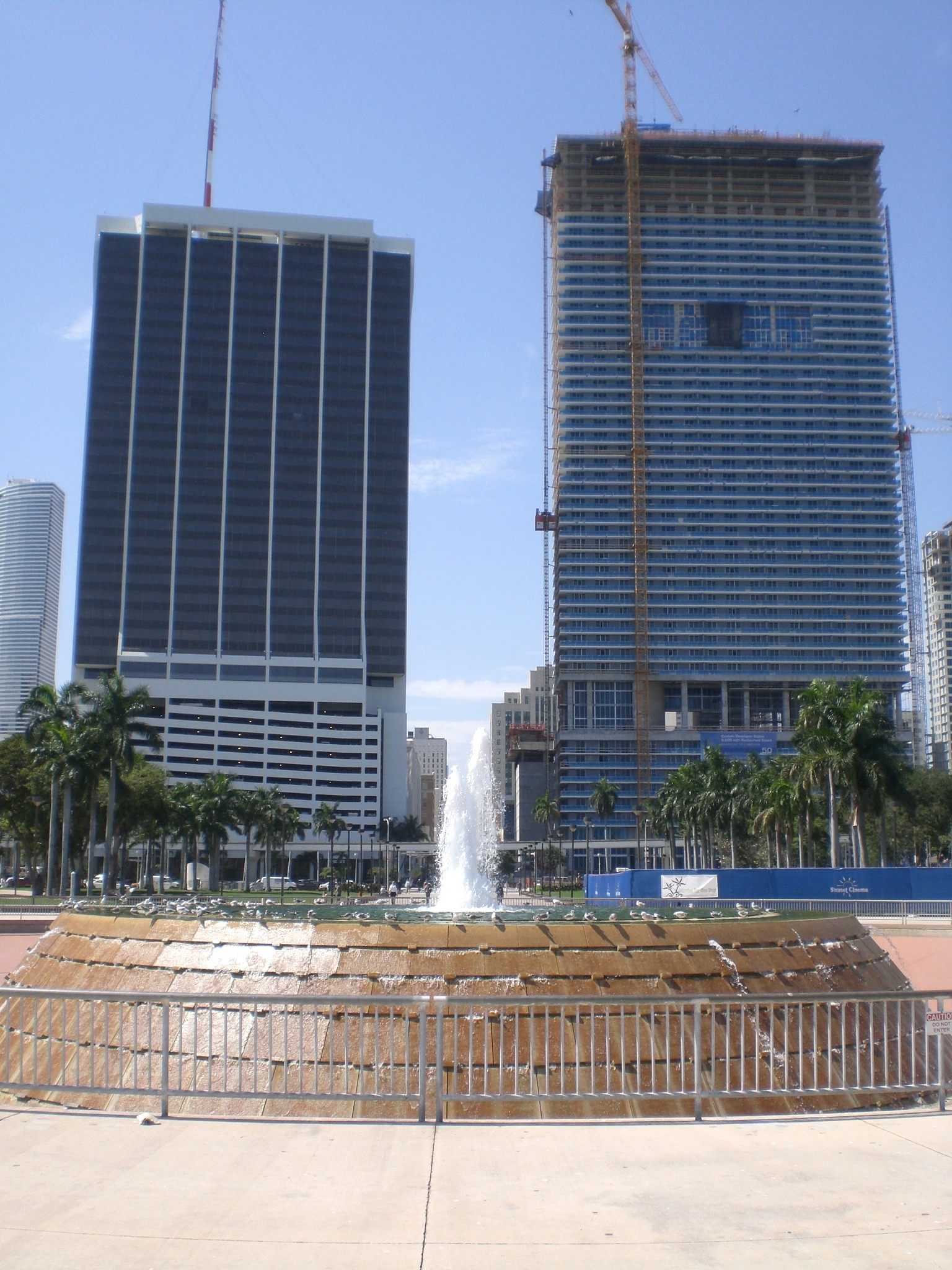
The large fountain on Biscayne Bay is a landmark in the park.

- Caesar LaMonaca, composer and band leader

== Facilities ==
- The FPL Solar Amphitheater has a seating capacity of 10,000 people: 2,672 fixed benches and 7,328 in the lawn.
- The Tina Hills Pavilion is an open-air pavilion with a seating capacity of 1,000 people: 200 fixed seats and 800 in the lawn.

=== Auto racing ===
A temporary street circuit at Bayfront Park hosted the CART and American Le Mans Series auto races in 2002 and 2003.
