= First Street station (Miami) =

Miami Metromover station

First Street
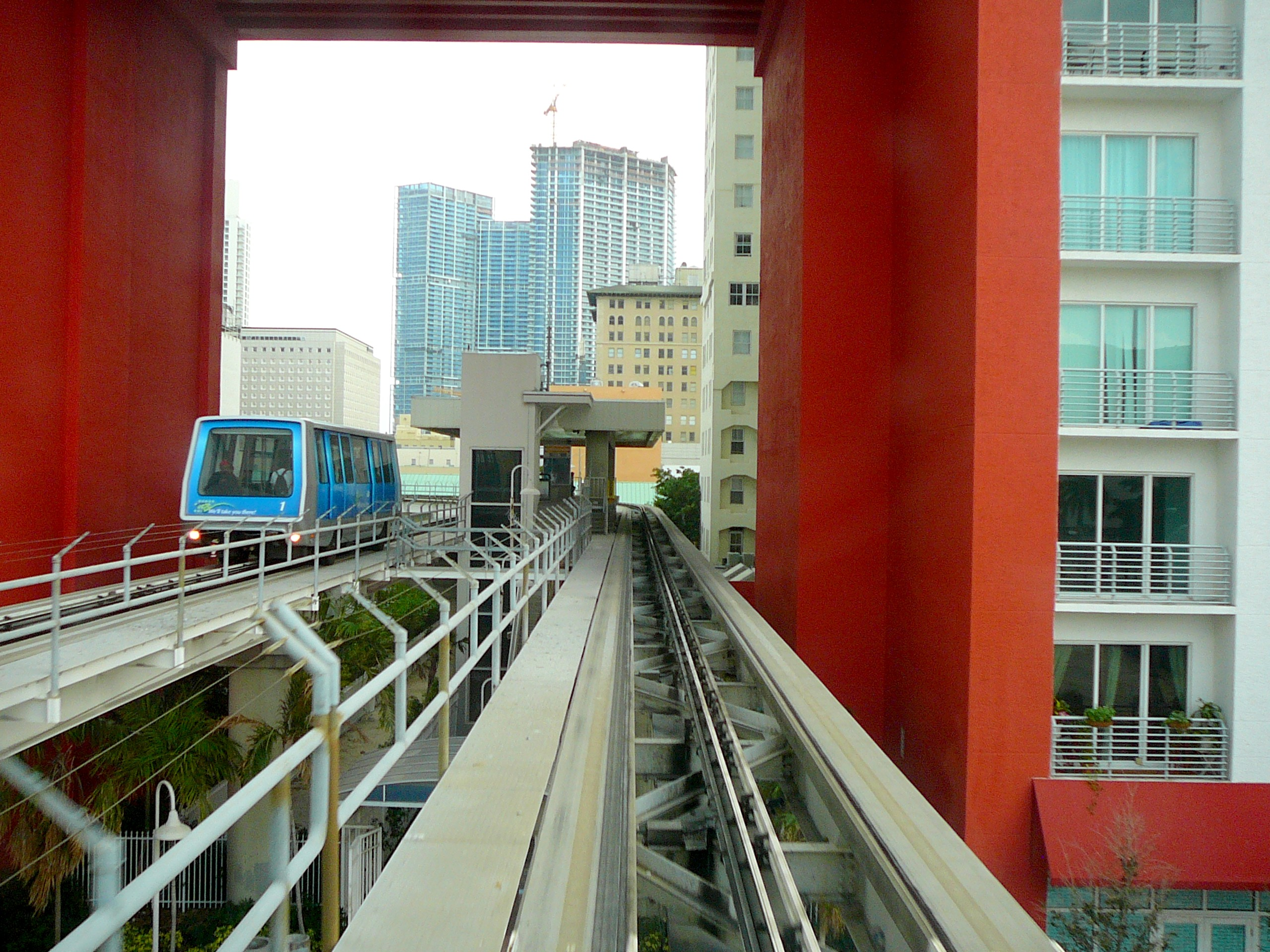
- View of the station under The Loft 2 tower

General information
- Location: 225 NE First Street; Miami, Florida
- Coordinates: 25°46′32″N 80°11′23″W
- Owner: Miami-Dade County
- Platforms: 1 island platform
- Tracks: 2
- Connections: Metrobus: 3, 9, 100, 203

Construction
- Accessible: Yes

History
- Opened: April 17, 1986

Services
Preceding station	Miami-Dade Transit	Following station
Bayfront Park One-way operation	Omni Loop	College Bayside toward School Board
Bayfront Park One-way operation	Brickell Loop	College Bayside toward Financial District
Bayfront Park Next clockwise	Inner Loop	College Bayside One-way operation
Location

First Street station is a Metromover station in Downtown, Miami, Florida. The station is located northeast of the intersection of Northeast First Street and Second Avenue, underneath The Loft 2 residential tower. It opened on April 17, 1986, as part of the first segment of the system. The station has a single island platform.
