= Miami Avenue station =

Miami Metromover station

Miami Avenue
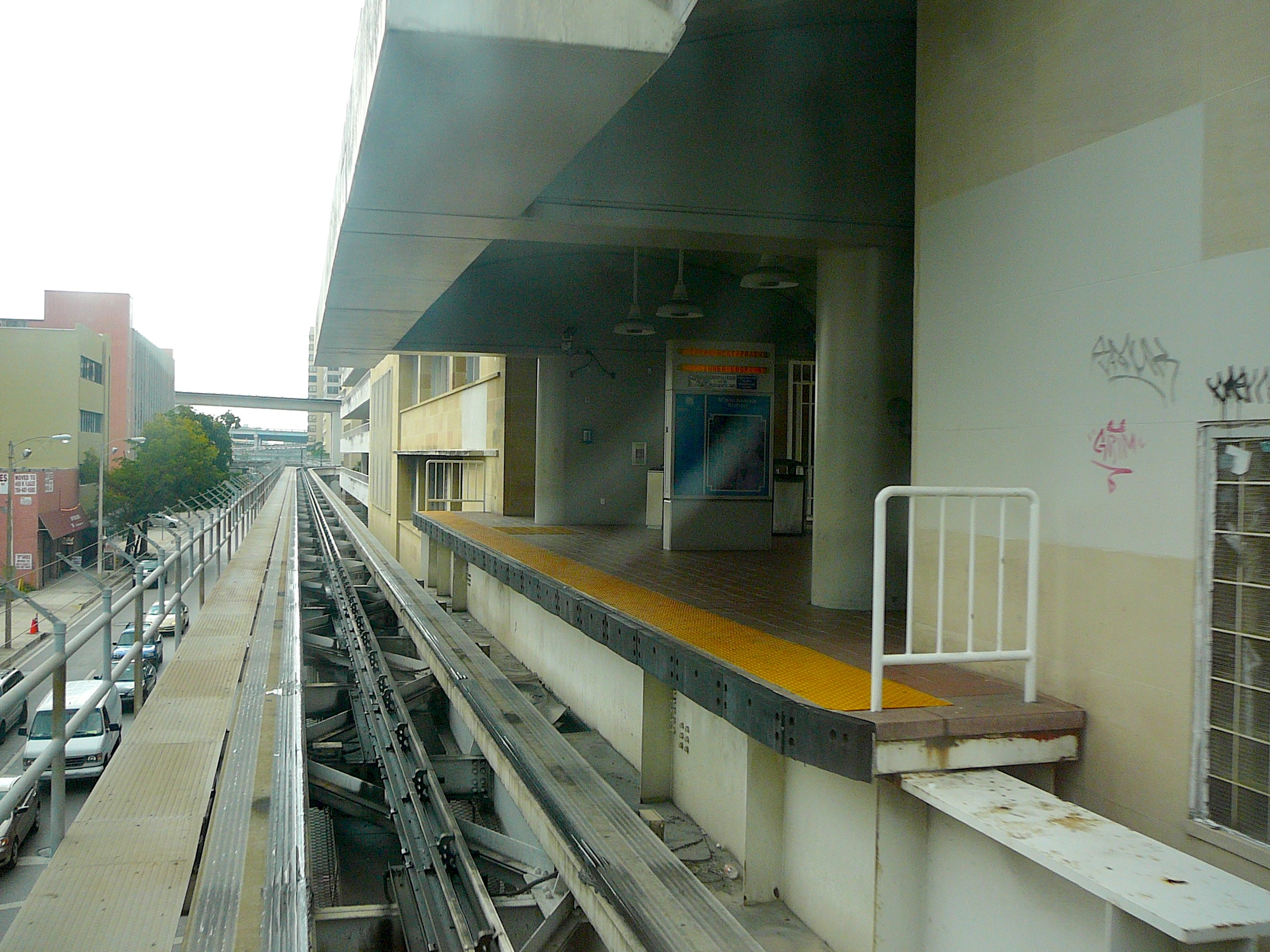

General information
- Location: 90 South Miami Avenue; Miami, Florida
- Coordinates: 25°46′24″N 80°11′36″W
- Owner: Miami-Dade County
- Platforms: 1 side platform
- Tracks: 1
- Connections: Metrobus: 2, 3, 7, 9, 11, 21, 77, 95, 100, 203, 207, 208, 400, 401, 836, 837

Construction
- Accessible: Yes

History
- Opened: April 17, 1986

Services
Preceding station	Miami-Dade Transit	Following station
Government Center Next clockwise	Inner Loop	Knight Center One-way operation
Location

Miami Avenue is a Metromover station in Downtown, Miami, Florida. The elevated station is located over South Miami Avenue on the north side of First Street. It opened on April 17, 1986, as part of the initial segment of the system.
