= Knight Center station =

Miami Metromover station

Knight Center
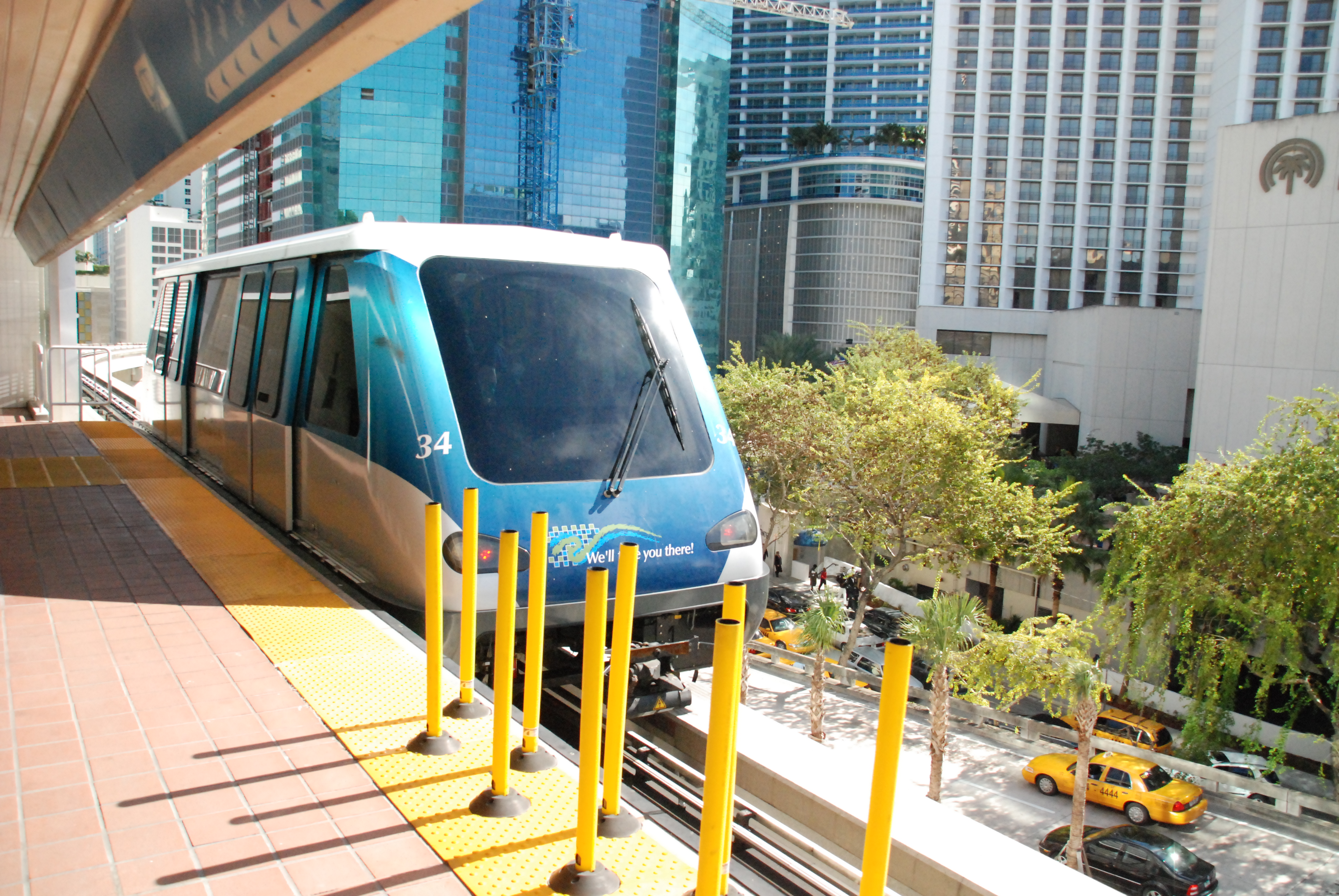
- Outer Loop train departing the station

General information
- Location: 100 SE Second Street; Miami, Florida
- Coordinates: 25°46′18″N 80°11′28″W
- Owner: Miami-Dade County
- Platforms: 1 island platform
- Tracks: 2

Construction
- Accessible: Yes

History
- Opened: April 17, 1986
- Former names: World Trade Center

Services
Preceding station	Miami-Dade Transit	Following station
Third Street One-way operation	Omni Loop	Bayfront Park toward School Board
Riverwalk One-way operation	Brickell Loop	Bayfront Park toward Financial District
Miami Avenue Next clockwise	Inner Loop	Bayfront Park One-way operation
Location

Knight Center station is an elevated Metromover station in Downtown, Miami, Florida. The station is located Miami Tower at the intersection of Southwest Second Street and Second Avenue. It is connected to the namesake James L. Knight Center by a glass-enclosed walkway underneath the Downtown Distributor freeway. The station has an island platform serving two tracks. It is served by the Inner Loop, Omni Loop, and Brickell Loop services.

World Trade Center station opened on April 17, 1986, as part of the initial segment of the system. (The name arose because the CenTrust Tower, now the Miami Tower, was originally planned to house the World Trade Center Miami.) By 1994, the station was called Knight Center.
