= One Miami =

Residential buildings in Florida, United States

One Miami West Tower
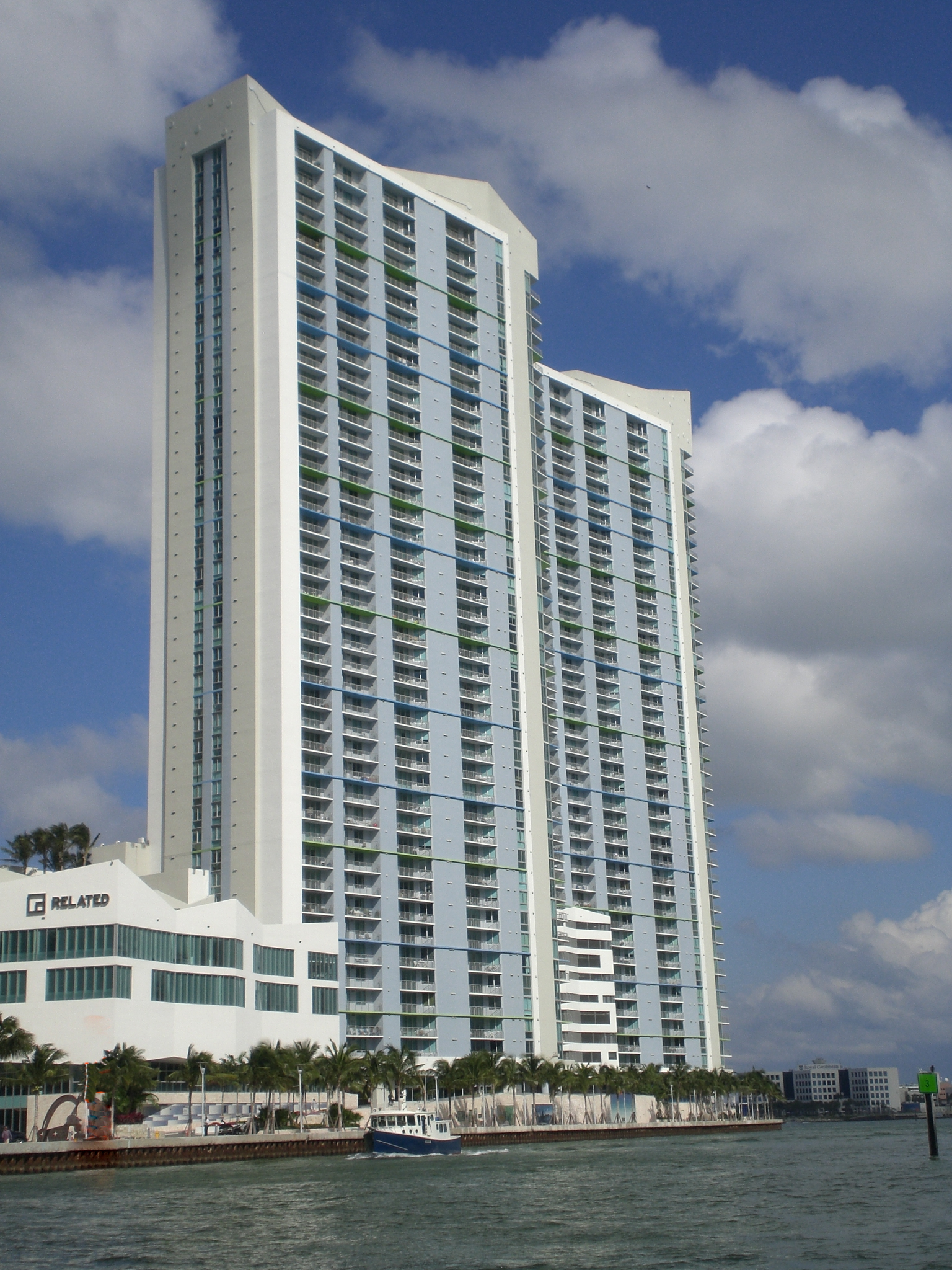
- One Miami towers in Downtown Miami at the mouth of the Miami River.

General information
- Type: Residential
- Location: 325 South Biscayne Boulevard, Miami, Florida, United States
- Construction started: 2001
- Completed: 2005
- Opening: 2005

Height
- Roof: 449 ft (137 m)

Technical details
- Floor count: 45

One Miami East Tower

General information
- Type: Residential
- Location: 335 South Biscayne Boulevard, Miami, Florida, United States
- Construction started: 2001
- Completed: 2005
- Opening: 2005

Height
- Roof: 460 ft (140 m)

Technical details
- Floor count: 44

One Miami is a complex of two adjacent skyscrapers in downtown Miami, Florida named One Miami East Tower and One Miami West Tower. It consists of two towers located at the Miami River delta, where the river empties into Biscayne Bay. The East Tower is the taller of the two, at 460 ft (140 m). It contains 44 floors, and was completed in 2005. The West Tower is 449 ft (137 m) tall, and contains 45 floors. It too was completed in 2005.

The development was one of the first announced in the recent Miami building boom. However, due to a slow construction phase, the buildings took over five years to be completed. The complex is located on South Biscayne Boulevard and Southeast 3rd Street. The buildings are entirely residential, consisting of condominiums. However, the complex does contain commercial elements too. A restaurant is featured on the ground floor at the entrance to the towers.

== See also ==
- List of tallest buildings in Miami
