= Metromover =

People mover system in downtown Miami, Florida

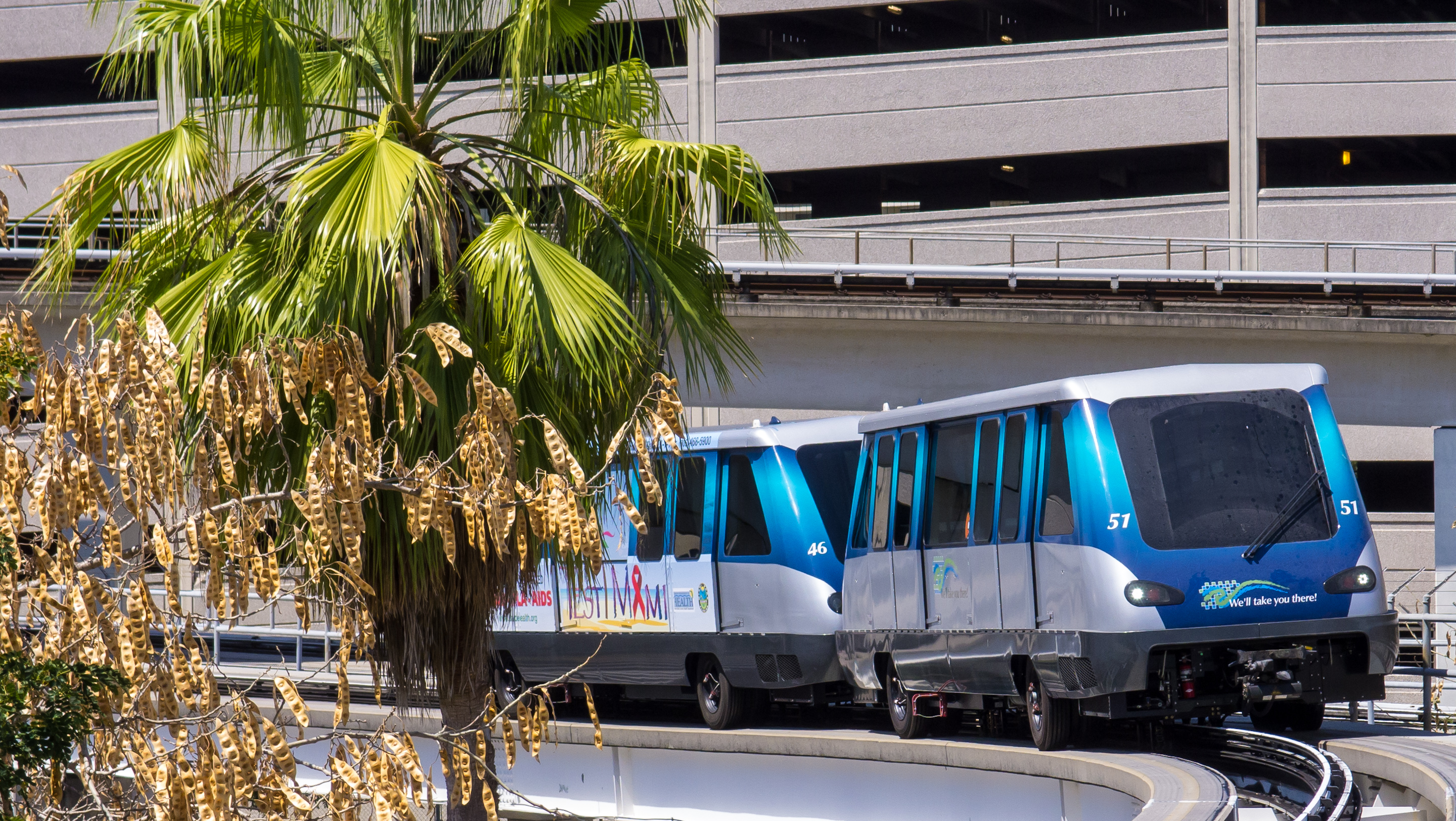
- A double-unit Metromover train in the Arts & Entertainment District

Overview
- Locale: Greater Downtown Miami, Florida, U.S.
- Transit type: Automated people mover
- Number of lines: 3
- Number of stations: 21
- Daily ridership: 25,800 (weekdays, Q2 2026)
- Annual ridership: 7,683,800 (2025)
- Chief executive: Stacy L. Miller, P.E.
- Website: miamidade.gov/transit

Operation
- Began operation: April 17, 1986 (Inner Loop); May 26, 1994 (Outer Loops)
- Operator: Miami-Dade Transit (MDT)

Technical
- System length: 4.4 miles (7.1 km)
- Electrification: Third rail
- Average speed: 9 mph (14 km/h)
- Top speed: 31 mph (50 km/h)
System map
Metromover highlighted in blue

The Metromover is a fare-free automated people mover system operated by Miami-Dade Transit in Miami, Florida, United States. Metromover serves the Downtown Miami, Brickell, Park West and Arts & Entertainment District neighborhoods. Metromover connects directly with Metrorail at Government Center and Brickell stations. It also connects to Metrobus with dedicated bus loops at Government Center and Adrienne Arsht Center station. It originally began service to the Downtown/Inner Loop on April 17, 1986, and was later expanded with the Omni and Brickell Loop extensions on May 26, 1994.

The Metromover serves primarily as an alternative way to travel within the greater Downtown Miami neighborhoods. The system is composed of three loops and 21 stations. The stations are located approximately two blocks away from each other, and connect near all major buildings and places in the Downtown area. As of 2025, the system has 7,683,800 rides per year, or about 25,800 per day in the second quarter of 2026.

Out of three downtown people movers in the United States, the other two being the former Jacksonville Skyway and the Detroit People Mover, the Metromover is by far the busiest in terms of ridership, the only completed system of the three, and considered to be a catalyst for downtown development.

== History ==
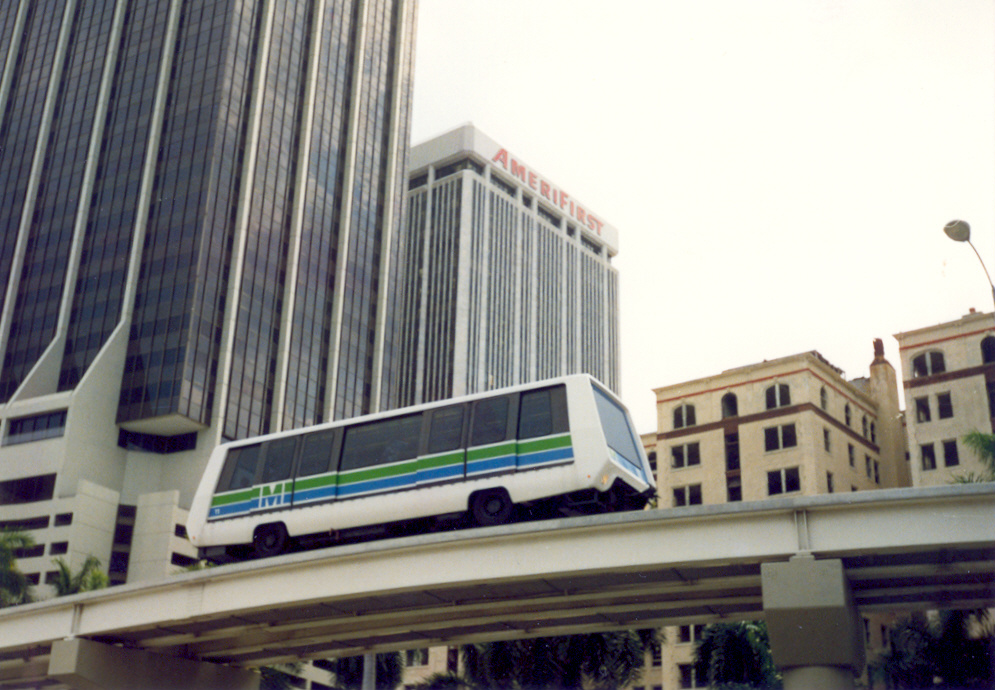
An Adtranz C-100 Metromover train in its original livery

In 1987, the then-one-year-old people mover system set a record in daily ridership of 33,053 on a Saturday, attributed to the new Bayside Marketplace. That same year was when the planning began to extend the system to Brickell and Arts & Entertainment District (then Omni), which would not be completed until 1994. Until November 2002 when the half-penny transit tax was approved, the Metromover had a fare of 25 cents. The fare was lifted because it was realized that the cost of collecting the fare nearly exceeded the revenue generated from the fare, as well as the fact that the eliminated fare would likely lead to more Metrorail ridership. After becoming free, from 2002 to 2005, along with a large increase in population, rising gas prices and booming downtown development, Metromover ridership nearly doubled from 4.7 million in 2002 to about 9 million in 2005. However, ridership fell with the subsequent economic downturn and high unemployment in the latter half of the decade. By 2012, ridership had once again increased with downtown population, high gas prices and a recovering economy. In early 2011, Metromover saw an increase in ridership during a sharp peak in gas prices, at the same time as there was a decrease in Metrorail and Metrobus ridership as well as a decrease in employment. However, from January 2010 to January 2011, Metrorail saw a 7% increase in ridership, and both Metrorail and Metromover were expected to see additional ridership increases throughout 2011 due to rising fuel prices. When the Omni and Brickell extensions were first planned, it was estimated that ridership on the fared system would reach 43,000 daily by 2000, a number the now free system has yet to reach.

== Operations ==
There are 21 accessible Metromover stations located throughout Downtown Miami and Brickell roughly every two blocks. The Metromover links all of Downtown and Brickell's major office buildings, residential buildings, hotels, and retail centers. Major attractions such as the Stephen P. Clark Government Center, American Airlines Arena, Arsht Performing Arts Center, the Cultural Plaza (Miami Art Museum, Historical Museum of Southern Florida, Miami Main Library), Bayside Marketplace, Mary Brickell Village, Miami-Dade College, Museum Park (which services Perez Art Museum Miami as well as the Frost Science Museum) and the Brickell Financial District can all be reached by the Metromover.

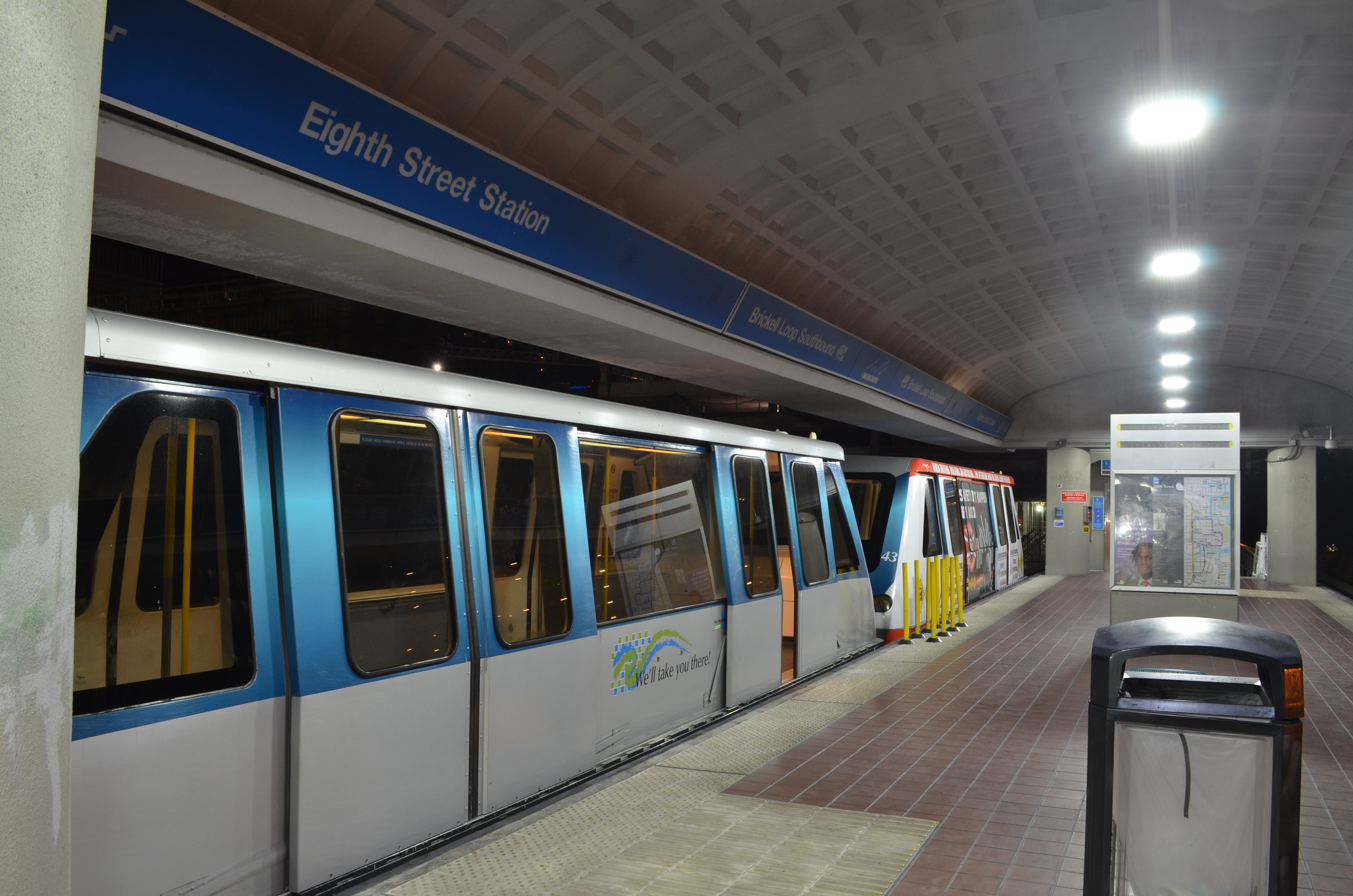
Rare double cars on the Brickell loop late at night.

Running clockwise, the Downtown (Inner) Loop serves all Downtown stations except Third Street station. The Outer Loop (Brickell and Omni Loops) runs counterclockwise and share tracks around the downtown area, serving all stations except for Miami Avenue Station. The Brickell loop runs a line into the Brickell area to the south of downtown, while the Omni Loop contains a line with stations in the Arts & Entertainment District neighborhood north of Downtown. This unusual pattern, a circular central loop where the trains running counterclockwise are those running from and back to destinations outside the loop, whereas trains in the opposite clockwise direction are only running a tight inner circular route, is also followed by the New York JFK Airport AirTrain system. The inner loop generally runs tandem two car trains while the outer loops only run with single cars. Each car can carry over 90 passengers.

The Metromover car maintenance base, unusual for a maintenance yard, is a building located downtown, at SW 1st Ave and SW 1st St, which lies between Government Center and 3rd St stations on the outer counterclockwise loop, at the point where the two loops split to run in adjacent parallel streets.

All loops run from 5 am to midnight, seven days a week. This schedule is adjusted during events. Trains on the Inner Loop run in tandem and arrive every 90 seconds during rush hours and every three minutes otherwise. Outer Loop trains arrive every 5 to 6 minutes; every 2.5 to 3 minutes where the track is shared.

The cost of building the system was about $153.3 million. The operating budget for the Inner and Outer (Brickell and Omni) loops in FY 2007 was $8,888,794. Ridership total for FY 2007 was 8.7 million. Not including capital costs, this gives an approximate cost of $1.02 per ride. Metromover does not charge for rides; however, a $2.25/1.1 fee is charged if transferring to Metrorail or Metrobus.

== Stations ==
The Metromover currently operates 21 stations, all within the Miami city limits.

Station	Lines	Connections	Opened
Government Center		Metrorail: Green Line, Orange Line; Metrobus: 2, 7, 7A, 9, 11, 51, 77, 93, 95, 119 (S), 120, 207, 208, 246, 277, 500, 836 Express; Miami Trolley: Coral Way; Broward County Transit: 95, 595	May 20, 1984
Wilkie D. Ferguson Jr.		Metrobus: 7, 7A, 836 Express; Brightline (at MiamiCentral)	April 17, 1986
College North		Metrobus: 7, 7A, 9, 120	April 17, 1986
College/Bayside		Metrobus: 9, 93, 119 (S), 120	April 17, 1986
First Street		None	April 17, 1986
Bayfront Park		Metrobus: 3, 93, 119 (S), 120	April 17, 1986
Knight Center		Metrobus: 119 (S), 120, 836 Express	April 17, 1986
Third Street		None	April 17, 1986
Miami Avenue		Metrobus: 7, 7A, 9, 11, 77, 93, 119 (S), 120, 836 Express	April 17, 1986
School Board		Metrobus: 9, 10	May 26, 1994
Adrienne Arsht Center		Metrobus: 3, 10, 16, 32, 93, 101 (A), 113 (M), 119 (S), 120	May 26, 1994
Museum Park		Metrobus: 3, 93, 95, 119 (S), 120	May 26, 1994
Eleventh Street		Metrobus: 9, 119 (S)	May 26, 1994
Park West		Metrobus: 9, 119 (S), 120	May 26, 1994
Freedom Tower		Metrobus: 7, 9, 119 (S), 120	May 26, 1994
Riverwalk		None	May 26, 1994
Fifth Street		None	May 26, 1994
Brickell City Centre		Metrobus: 95; Miami Trolley: Brickell Key & Mercy Hospital	May 26, 1994
Tenth Street Promenade		Metrobus: 95, 595; Miami Trolley: Brickell Key & Mercy Hospital	May 26, 1994
Brickell		Metrorail: Green Line, Orange Line; Metrobus: 8, 8A, 24, 102 (B), 207, 208, 500; Miami Trolley: Biscayne, Brickell, Coral Way	May 20, 1984
Financial District		Metrobus: 102 (B)	May 26, 1994

== Rolling stock ==
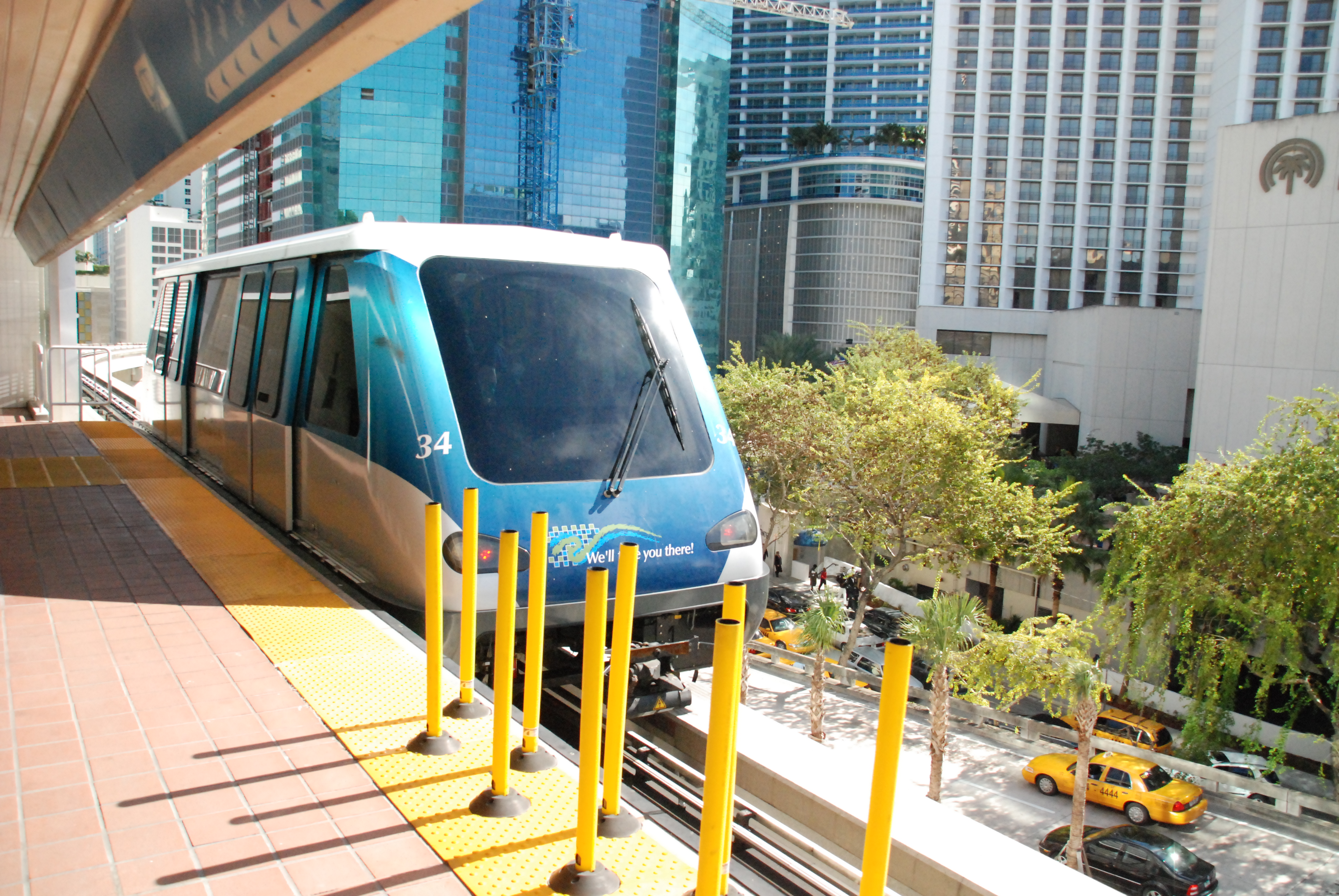
A Bombardier Innovia APM 100 Metromover train at Knight Center

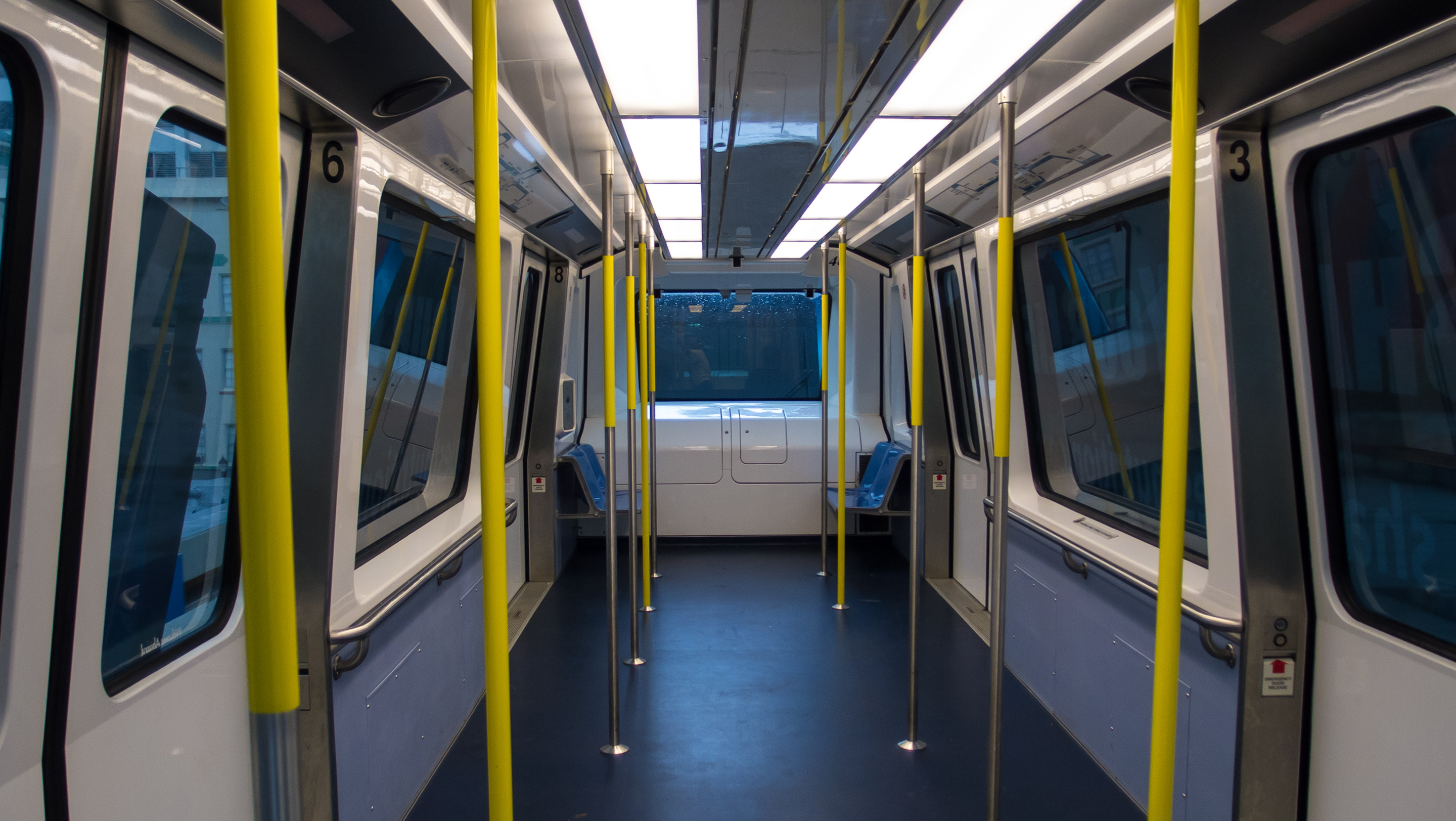
Bombardier Innovia APM 100 interior

Metromover mainly uses 29 Bombardier Innovia APM 100 vehicles, the first 12 of which were delivered during the summer and fall of 2008. These newer vehicles replaced the first 12 Westinghouse C-100 cars which were built by Westinghouse Electric in 1984, and include a more aerodynamic design, as well as an onboard CCTV system. Deliveries of an additional 17 cars from Bombardier Transportation began in July 2010, and as of early 2014 have largely replaced the second order of 17 Adtranz C-100 vehicles, built by Adtranz predecessor AEG-Westinghouse in 1992.

== Ridership ==
Sortable chart detailing monthly weekday ridership averages by Calendar Year; right hand chart giving annual averages may use "fiscal year" without disclosure, where the FY begins in October and has 75% of its time in the next year with only 25% in the starting year. Note the large jump in ridership in 2002 when the fare was removed after the passing of the half-penny tax. Yearly averages are rounded to the nearest 500, and the highest month is also in bold. After years of growth, Metromover ridership began falling in 2017, following years of sharp declines in Metrobus and Metrorail ridership. Ridership peaked again in early 2020 at over 30,000 per weekday before crashing during the years long covid pandemic.

#	Month	2010	2011	2012	2013	2014	2015	2016	2017	2018
1	January	27,900	29,700	28,000	31,800	32,200	32,800	34,400	32,600	28,700
2	February	25,600	30,700	31,000	32,700	34,700	33,200	35,300	32,900	30,100
3	March	25,600	30,500	32,400	32,500	35,300	35,000	**36,400**	34,100	31,100
4	April	26,300	30,700	29,700	30,400	31,100	32,400	34,700	31,700	
5	May	26,800	29,200	28,900	28,900	30,300	29,700	32,200	29,300	
6	June	25,800	29,600	29,500	32,500	30,200	30,100	31,300	28,100	
7	July	25,500	29,400	29,000	29,100	30,400	30,600	32,100	29,800	
8	August	26,800	29,000	27,200	28,700	31,100	31,100	30,600	28,900	
9	September	28,100	30,100	29,900	31,400	31,800	32,000	32,000	24,700	
10	October	30,000	31,100	31,100	33,000	33,900	35,000	31,500	29,300	
11	November	30,000	30,100	32,200	33,900	32,900	35,200	34,100	30,000	
12	December	27,700	27,200	29,600	31,400	32,300	33,200	32,000	29,200	
**13**	**Year Average**	**27,000**	**30,000**	**30,000**	**31,000**	**32,000**	**32,500**	**33,000**	**30,000**	

Average Weekday Passengers (Metromover loops only)
Fiscal Year	Ridership	%±
1995	12,700
1996	12,000	-0.6%
1997	13,500	+12.5%
1998	13,269	-1.7%
1999	13,880	+4.6%
2000	14,383	+3.6%
2001	16,849	+17.1%
2002	16,444	0.0%
2003	25,521	+55.2%
2004	28,192	+10.5%
2005	28,473	+1.0%
2006	27,042	-5.0%
2007	28,058	+3.8%
2008	26,682	-4.9%
2009	25,883	-3.0%
2010	27,175	+5.0%
2011	29,775	+9.6%
2012	31,000	+4.1%
2013	32,800	+5.8%

=== Average weekday passengers ===
This table includes Metrorail ridership as the two systems were built together and are mutually reliant on the thousands of daily transfers at Government Center and Brickell stations.

Year	Annual passengers (with Green & Orange lines)	Average weekday passengers (with Green & Orange lines)
1995	18,614,000	63,100
1996	18,092,400	60,100
1997	18,098,900	60,800
1998	17,363,800	58,140
1999	17,839,100	60,654
2000	18,280,100	61,639
2001	18,629,800	63,514
2002	19,103,800	63,508
2003	21,297,400	76,769
2004	24,673,900	83,486
2005	25,538,500	88,173
2006	25,777,600	85,400
2007	26,510,800	87,767
2008	27,799,600	90,392
2009	25,778,200	85,875
2010	25,559,400	87,075
2011	27,515,100	92,334
2012	28,498,500	104,000
2013	30,531,100*	105,500*

*Record high

== Incidents ==
- On September 10, 2008, a man was trying to reach his hat that was blown off his head by a gust of wind. While doing so he was struck and killed by a Metromover car.
- On July 21, 2010, two northbound cars collided, causing minor injuries to 16 passengers.
- On February 5, 2014, a man was struck and killed at the Riverwalk Station. Witnesses reported that the man jumped in front of the approaching Metromover car.

== Expansion ==
=== Port of Miami ===
In May 2011, a study was proposed to analyze the idea of extending the Metromover to the PortMiami. This, with Metrorail and the new MIA Mover would create a direct rail transit link from the airport to the seaport. However, the study, which would take at least a year and cost about $120,000, was only a proposal to be voted on and the idea has not been reported on since 2014.

=== South Beach ===
There have been multiple proposals for a Metromover service to southern Miami Beach. One was as part of the proposed Resorts World Miami megaproject in Miami's Arts & Entertainment District neighborhood, announced in mid-2011, a Metromover expansion from Downtown Miami to South Beach was being pushed as recompense for building a casino. The line could potentially run from the Arts & Entertainment District across the Venetian Causeway to 17th Street in South Beach ending at the Miami Beach Convention Center. The line could have three stations in South Beach along 17th Street- Alton Road, Meridian Avenue and Washington Avenue. This would connect Miami Beach to rail mass transit for the first time, and provide a direct rail connection into one of the Miami area's most visited neighborhoods. The line would also allow for future expansions later across South Beach. More recently, proposals for a separate, most likely at-grade, light-rail system known as BayLink have been revived.

Miami-Dade originally planned to have a monorail along the southern edge of MacArthur Causeway from Downtown Miami to South Beach. However, in November 2022, the original plan would be changed to Metromover because the budget did not allow for the proposed monorail and it would not provide a one-seat ride from Downtown Miami to South Beach.

=== Northward expansion ===
A county plan unveiled in March 2021 shows an extension north from the current School Board station along North Miami Avenue, connecting the system to Midtown, Wynwood, and The Design District. An infill station called Herald Plaza would also be added on the site of the former Miami Herald building, eventually connecting the Metromover system to Miami Beach.

== See also ==
- Transportation in Miami
- Metrorail (Miami-Dade County)
- Tri-Rail
- MIA Mover
- Bukit Panjang LRT
