= Financial District station (Miami) =

Miami Metromover station

Financial District
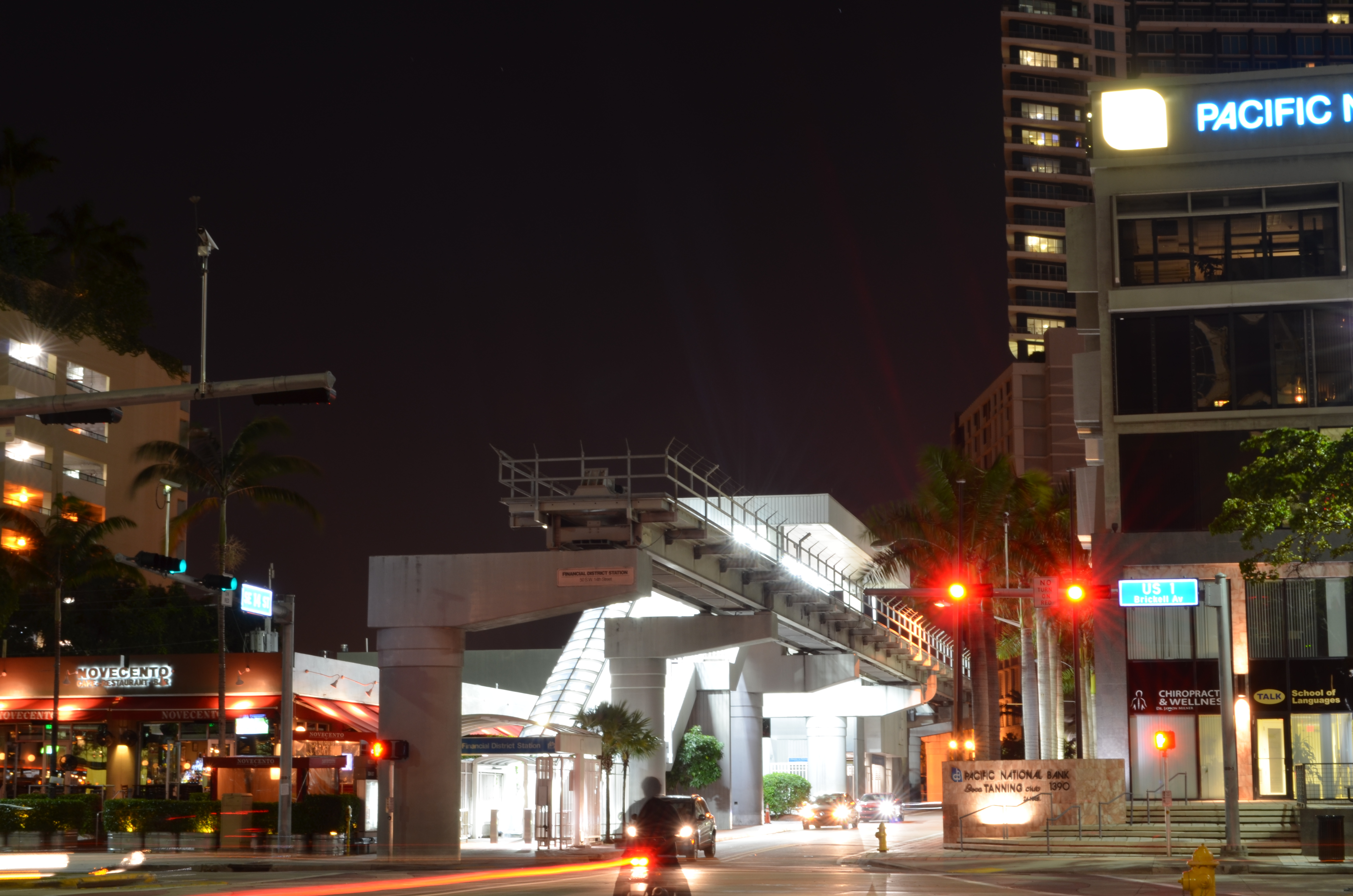
- Financial District station in 2013

General information
- Location: 50 SE 14th Street; Miami, Florida
- Coordinates: 25°45′37″N 80°11′34″W
- Owner: Miami-Dade County
- Platforms: 1 side platform
- Tracks: 1
- Connections: Metrobus: 26

Construction
- Accessible: Yes

History
- Opened: May 26, 1994

Services
Preceding station	Miami-Dade Transit	Following station
Terminus	Brickell Loop	Brickell toward Downtown
Location

Financial District station is an elevated Metromover station in the Brickell neighborhood of Miami, Florida. It is located on the south side of Southwest 14th Street between South Miami Avenue and Brickell Avenue. The station is the southern terminus of the Brickell Loop. It has a single side platform with a single track. The station opened on May 26, 1994, as part of the Bricknell extension.
