= Government Center =

Government Center may refer to:

== United States ==
- Government Center, Boston, a city square in Massachusetts
- Government Center, Miami, a district in Miami, Florida
  - Stephen P. Clark Government Center, the county hall of Miami-Dade County, Florida
- Government Center, Newark, an area in downtown Newark, New Jersey
- The headquarters building (or complex of buildings) of certain county governments:
  - Burnett County, Wisconsin
  - Clark County, Nevada
  - Delaware County, Pennsylvania
  - Fairfax County, Virginia
  - Hennepin County Government Center, Minnesota
  - Kings County, California
  - Salt Lake County, Utah
  - San Luis Obispo County, California
  - San Mateo County, California
  - Santa Clara County, California
  - Solano County, California
  - Ventura County, California
- The headquarters building (or complex of buildings) of certain city governments:
  - Bremerton, Washington
  - Columbus, Georgia
  - Florence, Kentucky
  - Stamford, Connecticut

== Canada ==
- Government Centre, an area in Downtown Edmonton, Alberta

== See also ==
- Government Center station (disambiguation)
- Government Plaza (disambiguation)
