= Government Center (Miami) =

Neighborhood in Miami, Florida

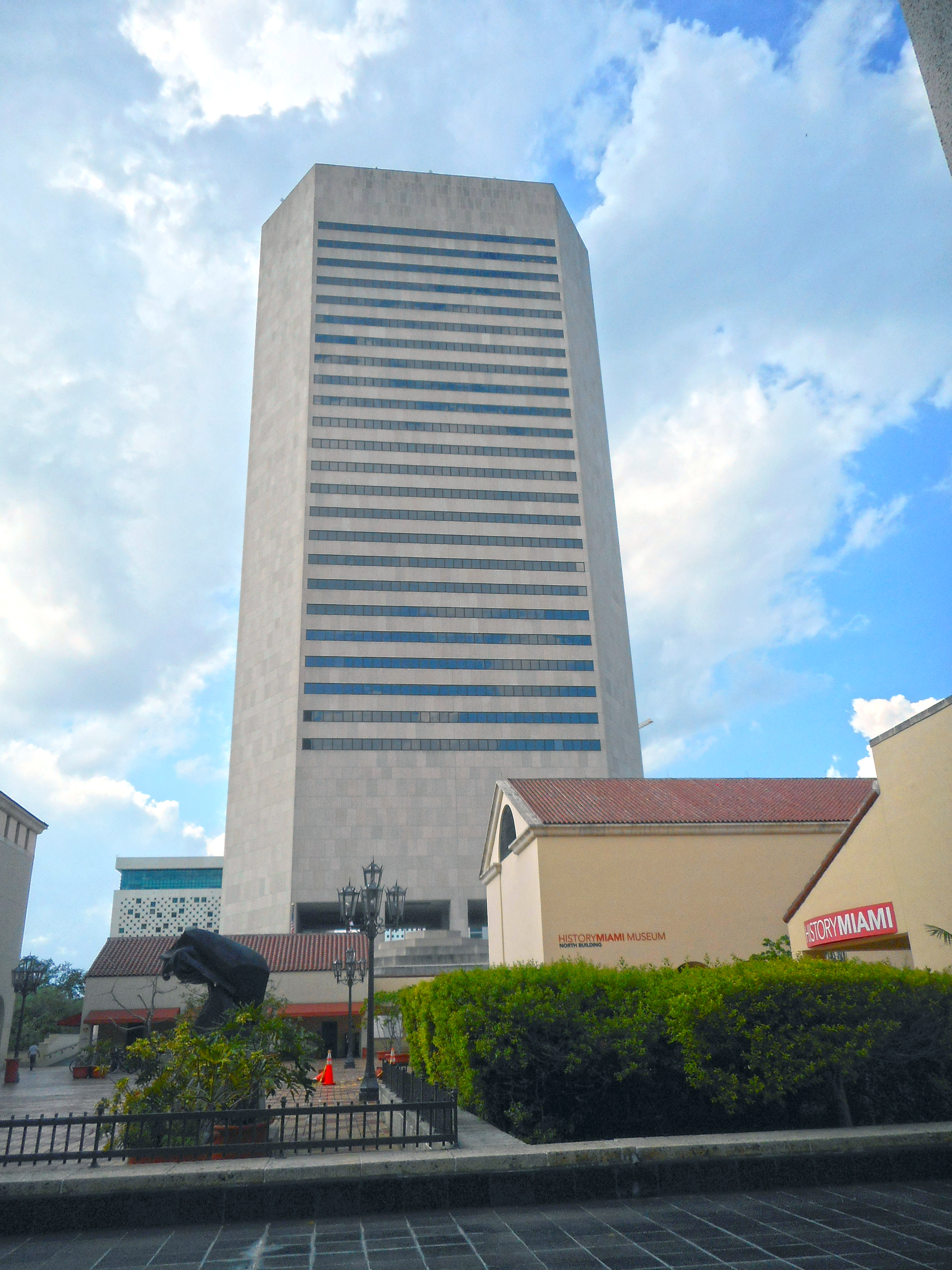
A Government Center district sign with the Stephen P. Clark Government Center and Miami-Dade County Courthouse in the background

Government Center is a district in the western portion of downtown Miami, Florida, bound roughly by I-95 and West (NW/SW) 3rd Avenue to the west, South (SW/SE) 1st Street to the south, North (NE/NW) 5th Street to the north, and East (NE/SE) 1st Avenue to the east.

The area includes several courthouses, including the historic Miami-Dade County Courthouse and a US district court, the City of Miami police headquarters, city, county, and state offices. The eponymous and most used county transit station, Government Center, serving Metrorail, Metromover, and Metrobus, is located in the bottom of the Stephen P. Clark Government Center building. Directly south of this is the main branch of the Miami-Dade Public Library System, as well as the HistoryMiami museum. Henry Flagler's Florida East Coast Railroad owns roughly nine acres in the middle of Government Center, the site of its former Miami station, which spans several blocks. While the station was destroyed in 1963 and the site had been used as surface parking lots in the decades following, the railroad never gave up ownership of the property. In mid 2014, the lots were closed down for construction of the MiamiCentral intercity rail station, as part of the Brightline system.

Besides governmental office and public buildings, there are many street level retail shops and some private office space in Government Center. The New World School of the Arts is located on the east side of Government Center, adjacent to Miami-Dade College's Wolfson Campus. Additionally, there is much historic architecture dating as far back as the late 19th century in Government Center, which overlaps largely with the Downtown Miami Historic District.

== Notable locations ==
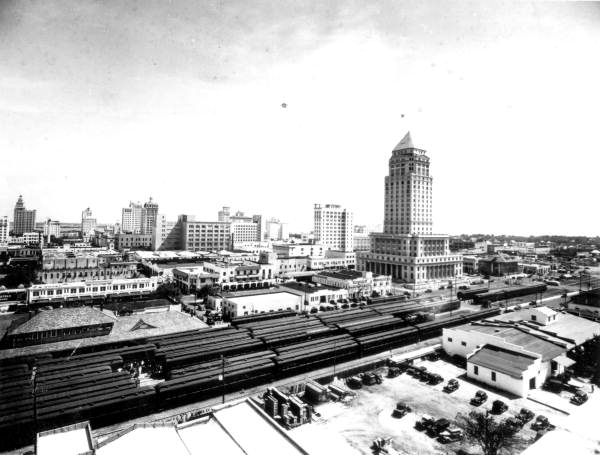
1930s photo of Downtown Miami with Government Center in foreground with Florida East Coast Railway station

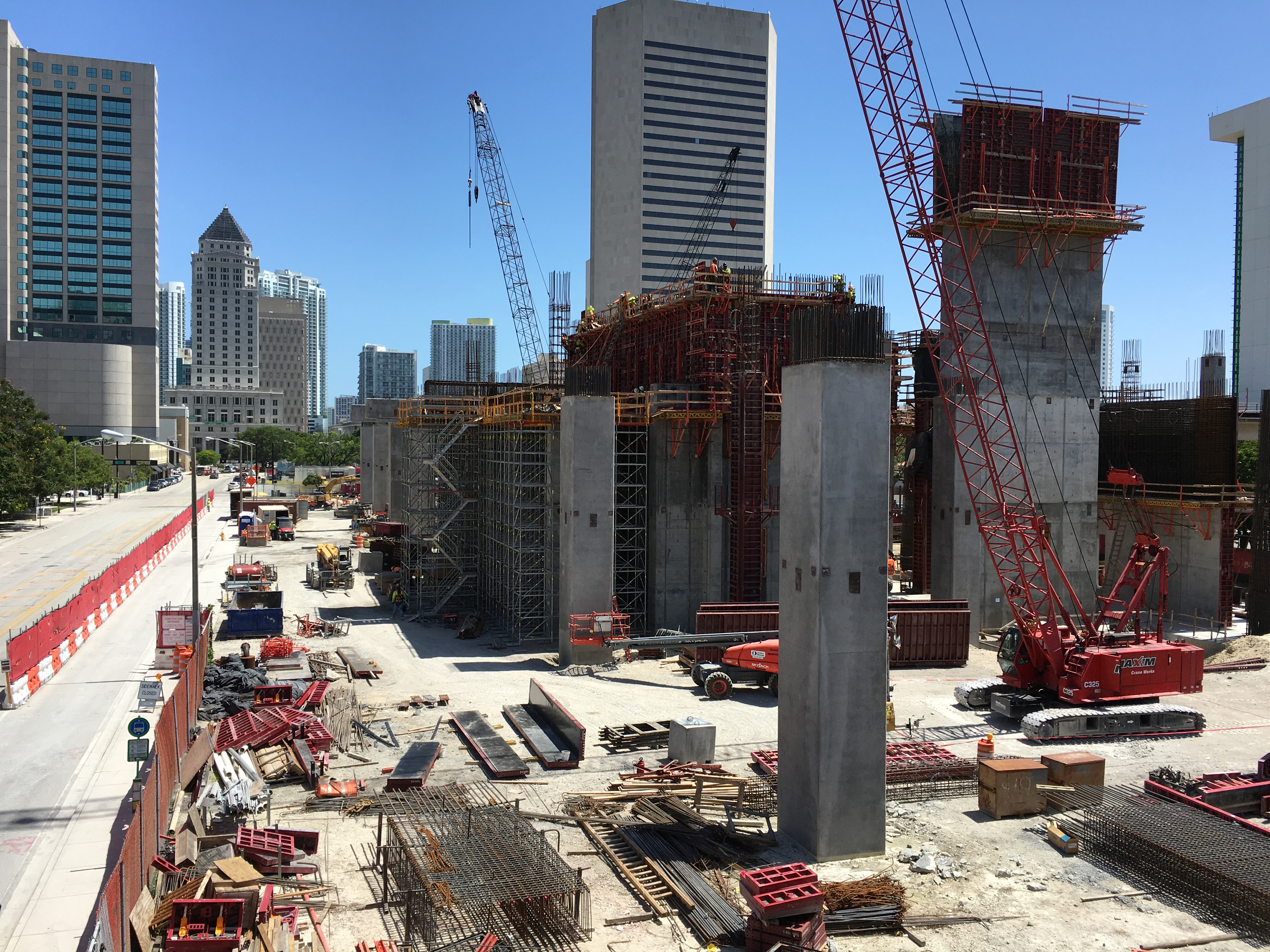
July 2016 photo with new MiamiCentral station under construction by subsidiary of FEC railway.

- Stephen P. Clark Government Center
- Government Center (MDT station)
- MiamiCentral railroad station
- Courthouse Center (Miami)
- Courthouse Tower
- Miami-Dade County Courthouse
- Wilkie D. Ferguson Jr US Courthouse
- David W. Dyer Federal Building and United States Courthouse
- Old United States Post Office and Courthouse (Miami, Florida)
- Miami-Dade Public Library System
- HistoryMiami
- Museum Tower (Miami)
- Law Enforcement Officers' Memorial High School
- City of Miami Police headquarters building
- Rhode state office building
- Claude Pepper Federal Building
- New World School of the Arts

== Gallery ==
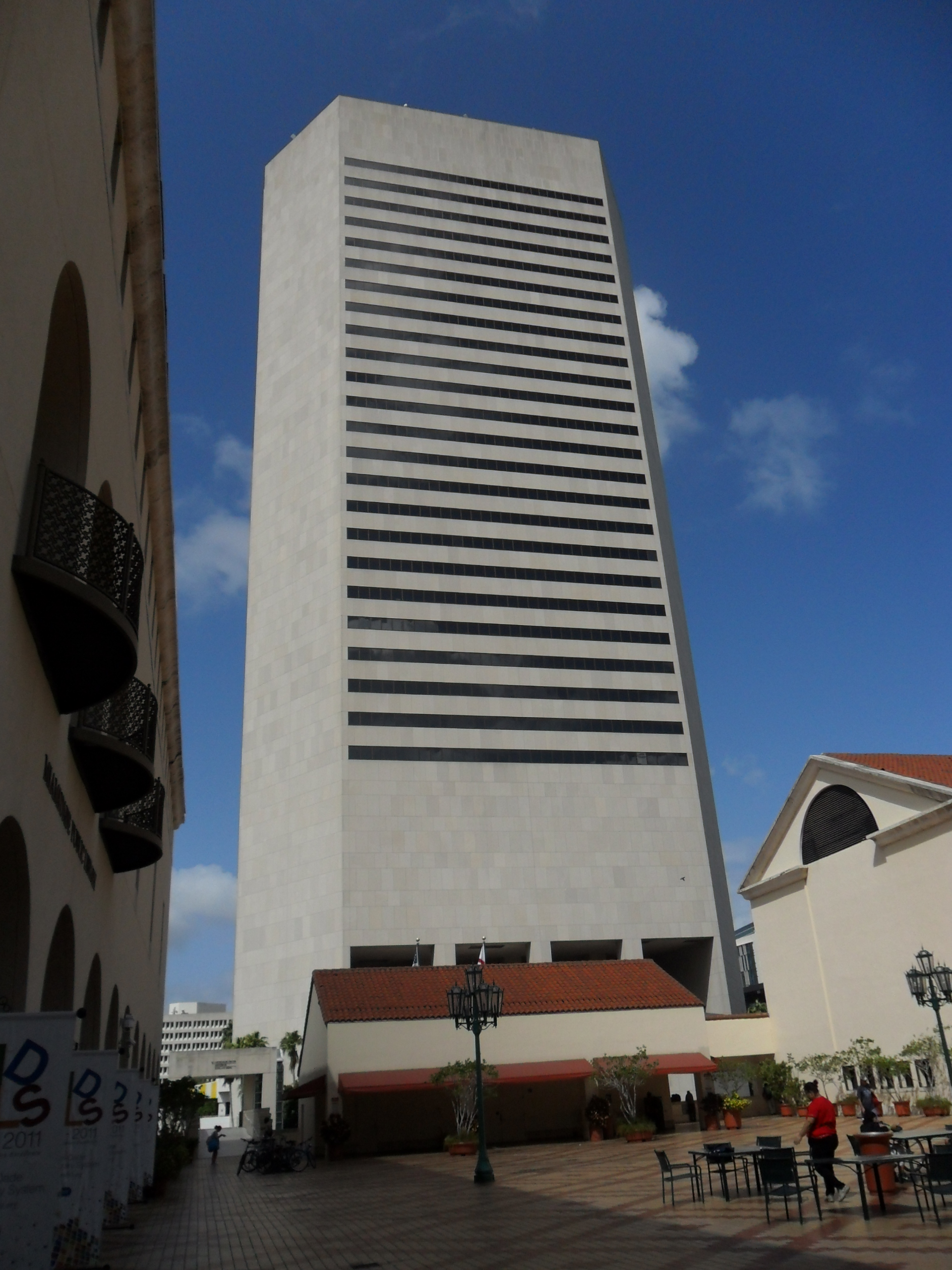
The Stephen P. Clark Government Center building viewed from the Main Library and HistoryMiami courtyard

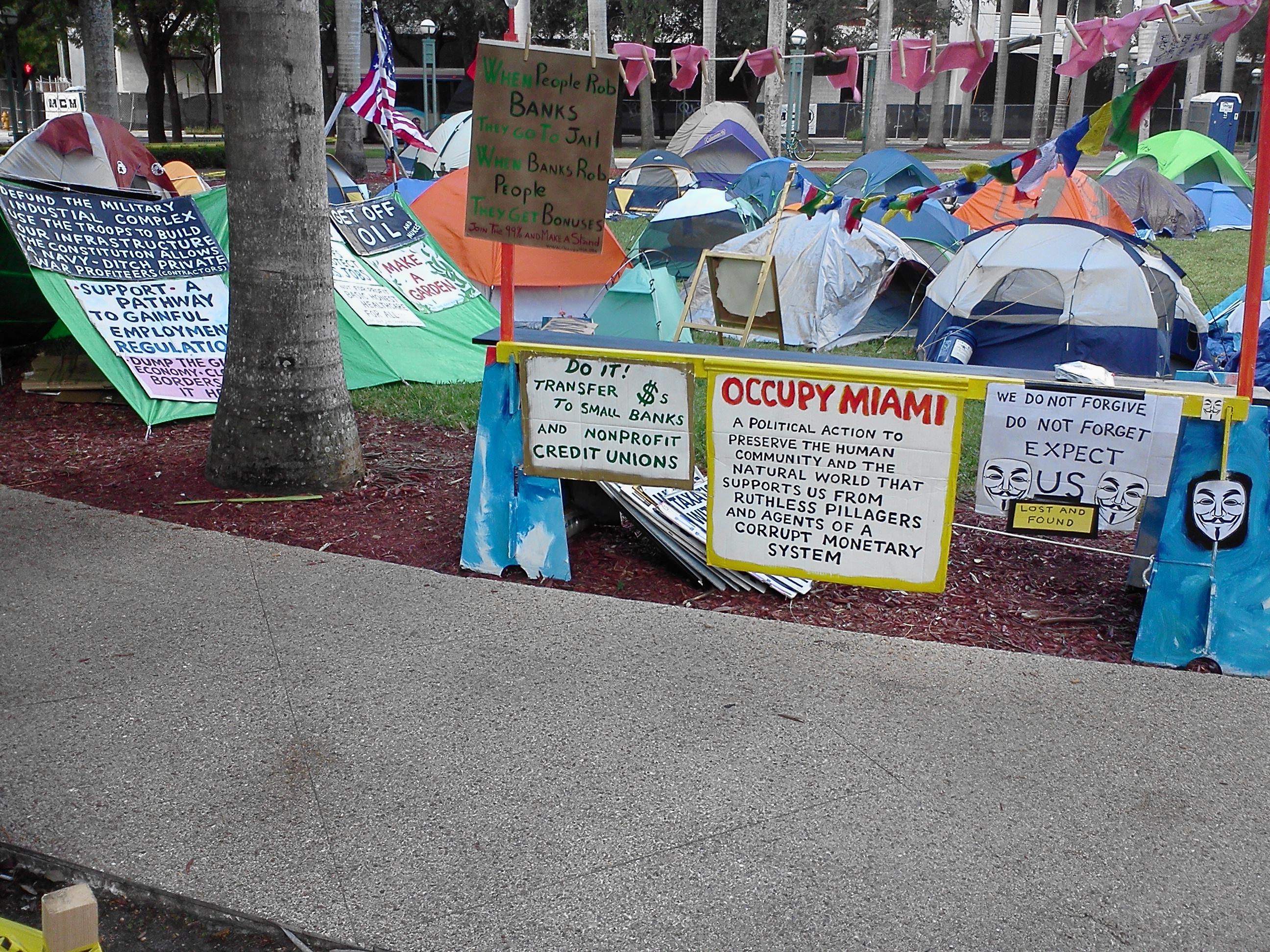
Occupy Miami in Government Center

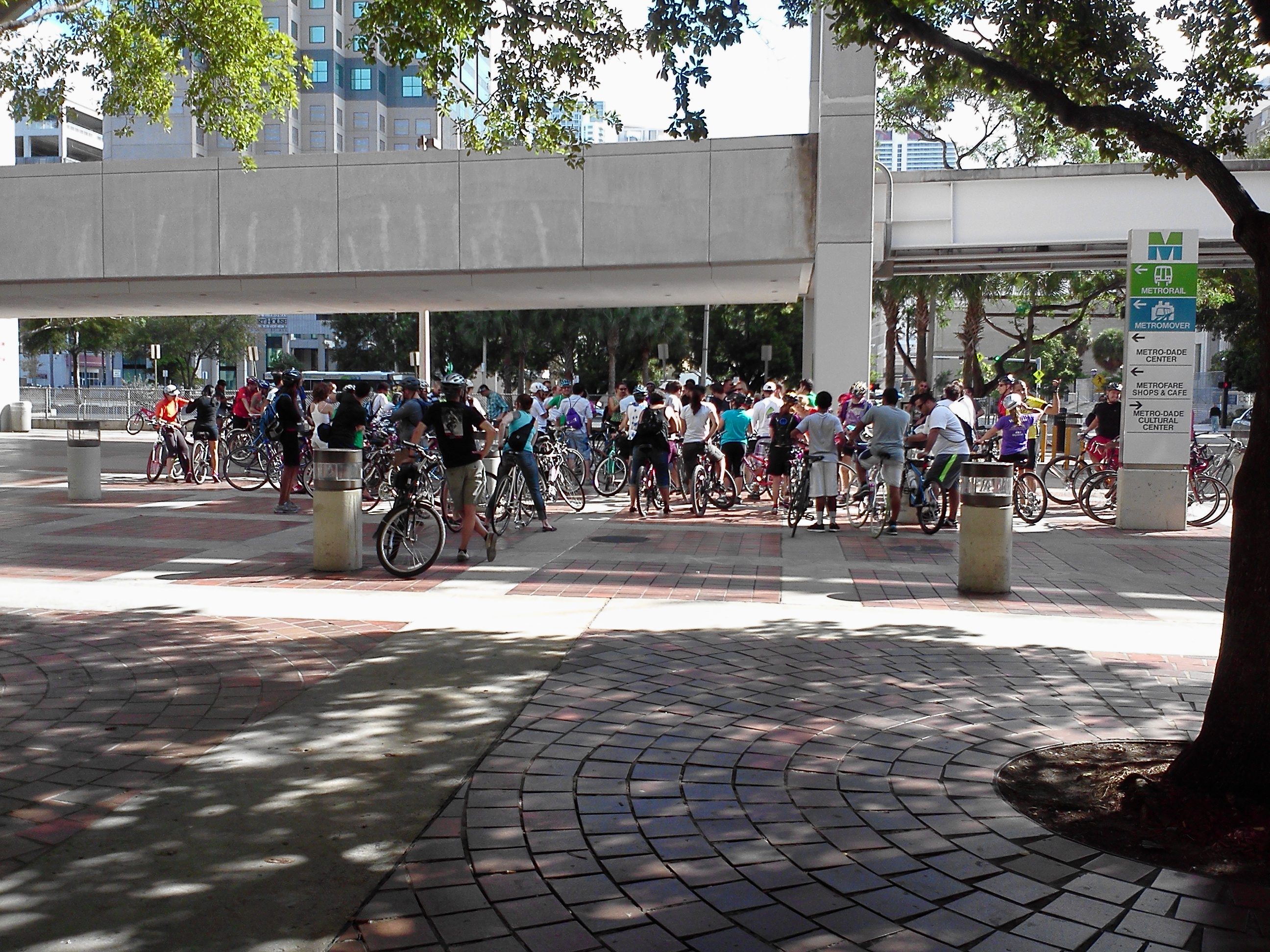
Critical Mass Miami assembles in Government Center

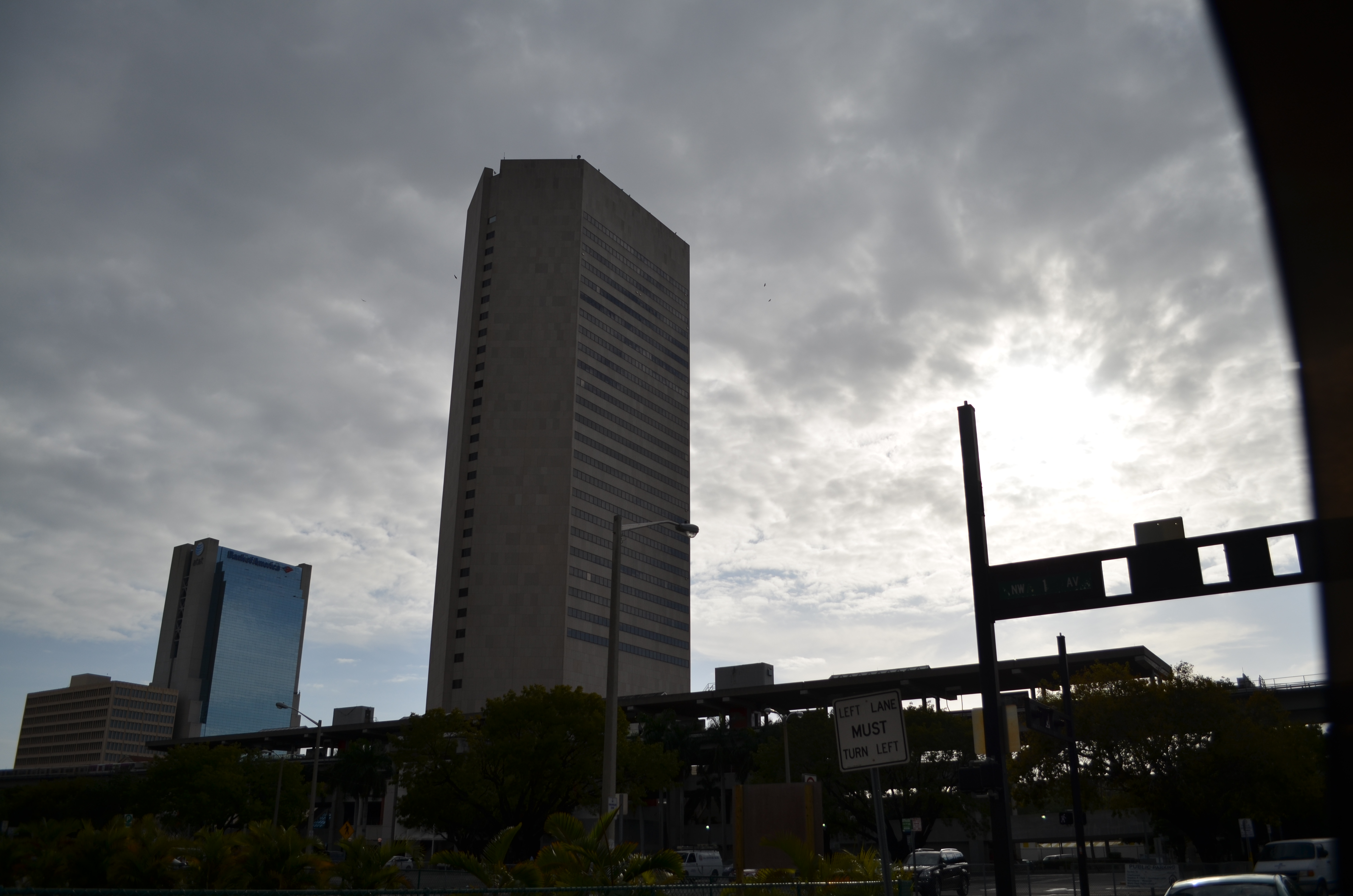
Government Center Metrorail and Metromover station is located at the bottom of the Stephen P. Clark Government Center building. Government Center Metrobus hub is two blocks north.
