= Government Center station (Miami) =

Miami-Dade Transit metro station

●● Government Center
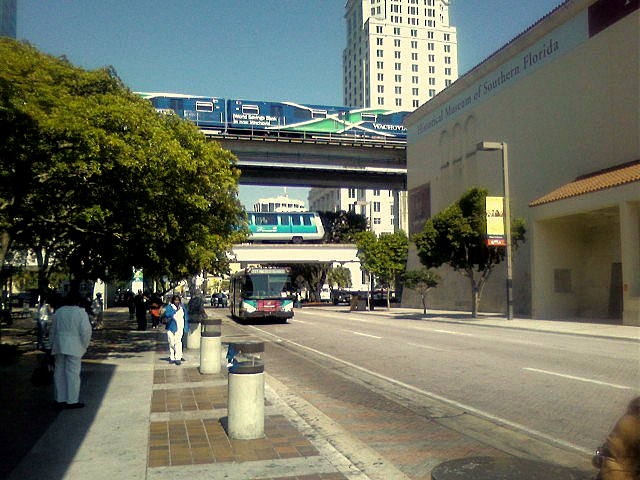
- Three modes of transit operating simultaneously at Government Center station

General information
- Location: 101 NW 1st Street (Metrorail); 138 NW 3rd Street (Metromover); Miami, Florida
- Coordinates: 25°46′33″N 80°11′45″W
- Owner: Miami-Dade County
- Platforms: 1 island platform (Metrorail); 2 side platforms (Metromover)
- Tracks: 2 (Metrorail); 2 (Metromover)
- Connections: Brightline (at MiamiCentral); Tri-Rail (at MiamiCentral); Metrobus: 2, 3, 7, 7A, 9, 11, 21, 77, 95, 95A, 95B, 100, 101, 203, 207, 208, 211, 400, 401, 836, 837; Broward County Transit: 109, 110; Miami Trolley: Coral Way

Construction
- Structure type: Elevated
- Platform levels: 4
- Accessible: Yes

Other information
- Station code: GVT

History
- Opened: May 20, 1984 (Metrorail); April 17, 1986 (Metromover)

Passengers
- 2011: 3.2 million (Metrorail) ▲3%
- Feb 2014: 299,806 (Metrorail)
- Feb 2014: 210,134 (Metromover)

Services
Preceding station	Miami-Dade Transit	Following station
Brickell toward Dadeland South	Green Line	Historic Overtown/Lyric Theatre toward Palmetto
Brickell toward Dadeland South	Orange Line	Historic Overtown/Lyric Theatre toward Miami Int'l Airport
Third Street toward School Board	Omni Loop	Wilkie D. Ferguson Jr. One-way operation
Third Street toward Financial District	Brickell Loop	Wilkie D. Ferguson Jr. One-way operation
Miami Avenue One-way operation	Inner Loop	Wilkie D. Ferguson Jr. Next clockwise
Former services
Preceding station	Miami-Dade Transit	Following station
Brickell toward Dadeland South	Downtown Express	Terminus
Location

Government Center station is an intermodal transit hub in the Government Center district of Downtown Miami, Florida. Operated by Miami-Dade Transit, it serves as a transfer station for the Metrorail rapid transit and Metromover people mover systems, and as a bus station for Miami's Metrobus and, during weekday rush hours, Broward County Transit buses. The station is connected via a pedestrian bridge over NW 3rd Street to the southern end of MiamiCentral and is directly linked to the Stephen P. Clark Government Center Building. It opened on May 20, 1984, adjacent to the site of a former Florida East Coast Railway station. It also serves as a free connection to MiamiCentral, which connects to Brightline and South Florida's Commuter Rail, which is called Tri-Rail. These two train operators are in MiamiCentral.

== History ==
=== Metrorail and Metromover station ===
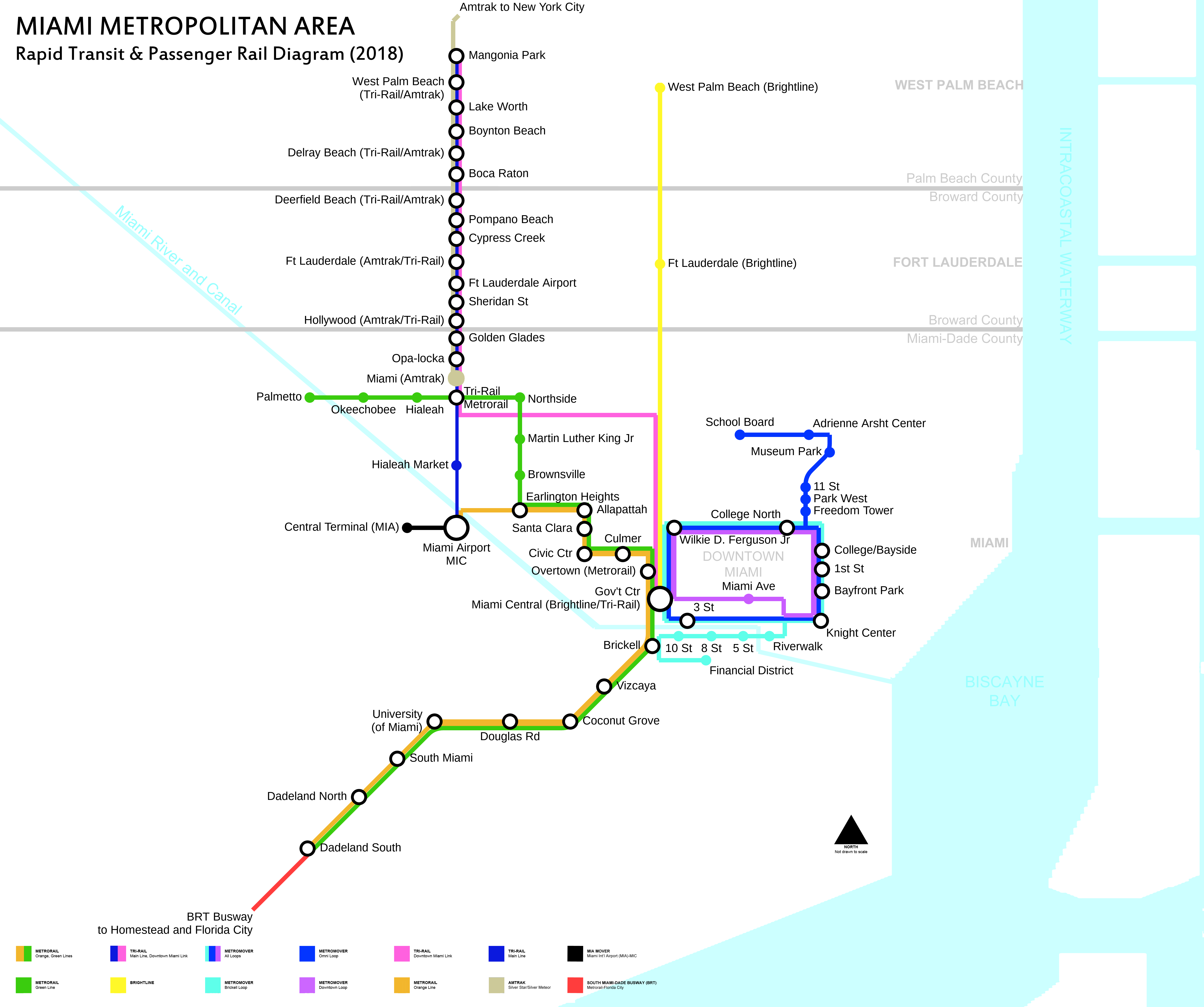
Schematic of 2018 rapid transit and passenger rail service in the Miami metropolitan area

Development of the civic center was reinvigorated during the 1970s and early 1980s amid a Downtown building boom, which led to the construction of the Stephen P. Clark Government Center, Metrorail, Metromover, and the Miami-Dade Cultural Plaza, home to HistoryMiami and the Miami-Dade Public Library System Main Library.

Construction on the present-day Government Center station began in June 1982. The station was designed by Cambridge Seven Associates in collaboration with Edward D. Stone and built by the Frank J. Rooney Construction Company. Metrorail service between Overtown and Kendall commenced in May 1984, following the former Florida East Coast Railway route.

An unused, partially completed "ghost platform" for a future East-West Metrorail line is located on the mezzanine level below the current Metrorail platform, visible to passengers transferring from Metromover. This platform was part of the original design concept interfacing with the atrium of the Miami-Dade County Administration Building and the Metromover station.

=== Florida East Coast Railroad station ===
The station is adjacent to the former site of a railroad station built in April 1896 as the southern terminus of Henry Flagler's Florida East Coast Railway (FEC). The terminal was demolished by November 1963. The FEC retained ownership of the site, which was used as parking lots until 2014. It is now MiamiCentral, an intermodal hub served by Brightline higher-speed inter-city trains since 2018 and Tri-Rail commuter trains since 2024.

== Station layout ==
The second floor contains the main Metrorail fare control area, Metromover platforms, and the Metrofare Shops retail area.

The third floor serves as a mezzanine for transfers between Metrorail and Metromover, includes the unused east–west "ghost platform," and features a pedestrian bridge connecting directly to the southern end of MiamiCentral for Brightline and Tri-Rail passengers.

The fourth floor houses the Metrorail platform, the highest in the Miami-Dade Transit system, capable of accommodating up to eight-car trains.

== Transit connections ==
=== Metrobus ===
Route	Description	Map	Notes
2	The Mall at 163rd Street via NW 2 Ave and North Miami Avenue	Map	
3	Aventura Mall via Biscayne Boulevard	Map	24-hour service
7	Dolphin Mall via NW 7 St	Map	
7A	Miami Airport Station via NW 7 ST/ NW 42nd AVE	Map	
9	Aventura Mall via NE 2 Ave	Map	
11	Downtown Miami ↔ Florida International University (FIU) Modesto Maidique Campus via Flagler Street and West 107 Ave (SR 985)	Map	24-hour service
21	Northside station via West 12 Ave	Map	
77	Downtown Miami ↔ Miami Gardens at Miami Gardens Drive/North 183 St or 199 St via NW 7 and NW 2 Ave. (US 441)	Map	24-hour service
95/95A/95B	95 Express (Golden Glades Tri-Rail station and Park and Ride Lot via I-95)	Map	Afternoon rush hours only
100	Aventura Mall via Miami Beach and Collins Avenue	Map	24-hour service
101	Miami Beach Mt. Sinai Medical Center via Alton Rd, MacArthur Causeway and Biscayne Blvd.	Map	
203	Biscayne MAX (Aventura via Biscayne Boulevard)	Map	Rush hours only; limited-stop
207	Little Havana Connection (Downtown Miami ↔ Little Havana via SW 7 St & 1 St)	Map	
208	Little Havana Connection (Downtown Miami ↔ Little Havana via Flagler Street & SW 8 St)	Map	
211	Flagler MAX (Downtown Miami ↔ Sweetwater via Flagler St)	Map	Rush hours only; limited-stop
400	South OWL (Downtown Miami ↔ Dadeland South station)	Map	Overnight only
401	North OWL (Downtown Miami ↔ 163 St Mall Terminal)	Map	Overnight only
836	Express (Downtown Miami ↔ Dolphin Station Park and Ride)	Map	Weekday rush hour only; limited-stop
837	Express (Downtown Miami ↔ Tamiami Station Park and Ride)	Map	Weekday rush hour only; limited-stop

=== Broward County Transit ===
Route	Description	Map	Notes
109	95 Express (Downtown Miami ↔ Pines Boulevard (SR 820) at Flamingo Road (SR 823) via I-95 and Pines Blvd)	Map	Weekday rush hour only; limited-stop
110	595 Express (Sunrise BB&T Center ↔ Downtown Miami and Brickell via I-95)	Map	Weekday rush hour only; limited stop

=== Miami Trolley ===
Route	Map
Coral Way	Map

== Places of interest ==
- Downtown Miami
  - Neighborhoods: Arts & Entertainment District, Park West, and Miami Jewelry District
- Adrienne Arsht Center for the Performing Arts
- Kaseya Center
- Bayfront Park
- Bayside Marketplace
- The Congress Building
- Courthouse Center
- David W. Dyer Federal Building and United States Courthouse
- Flagler Street
- Freedom Tower
- Historical Museum of Southern Florida
- Miami Art Museum
- Miami Dade College (Wolfson Campus)
- Miami-Dade County Courthouse
- Miami Main Library
- Museum Park
- Museum Tower
- New World School of the Arts
- Olympia Theater
- Stephen P. Clark Government Center

== Gallery ==
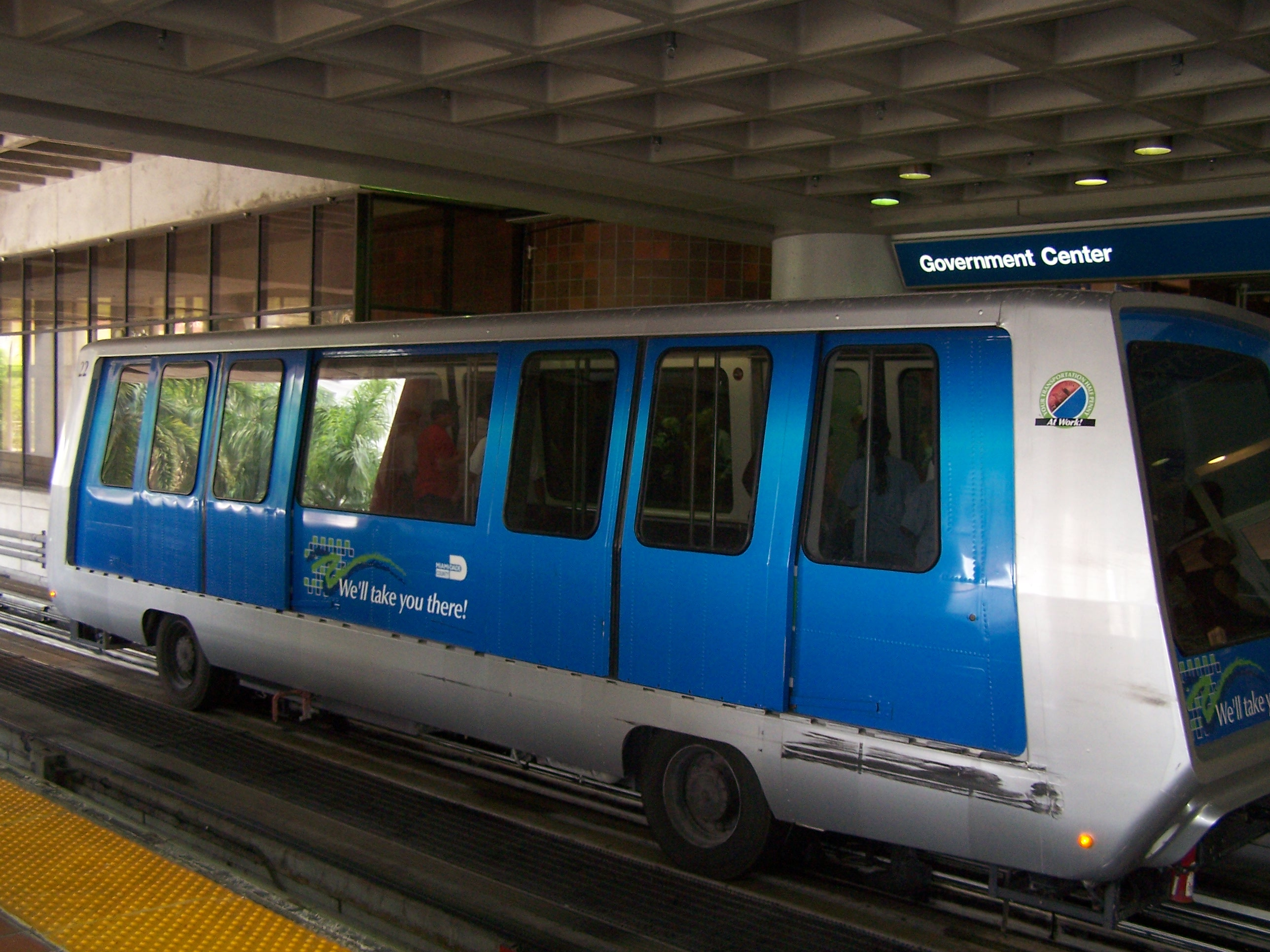
A Metromover car waiting on the lower level of the Government Center station.

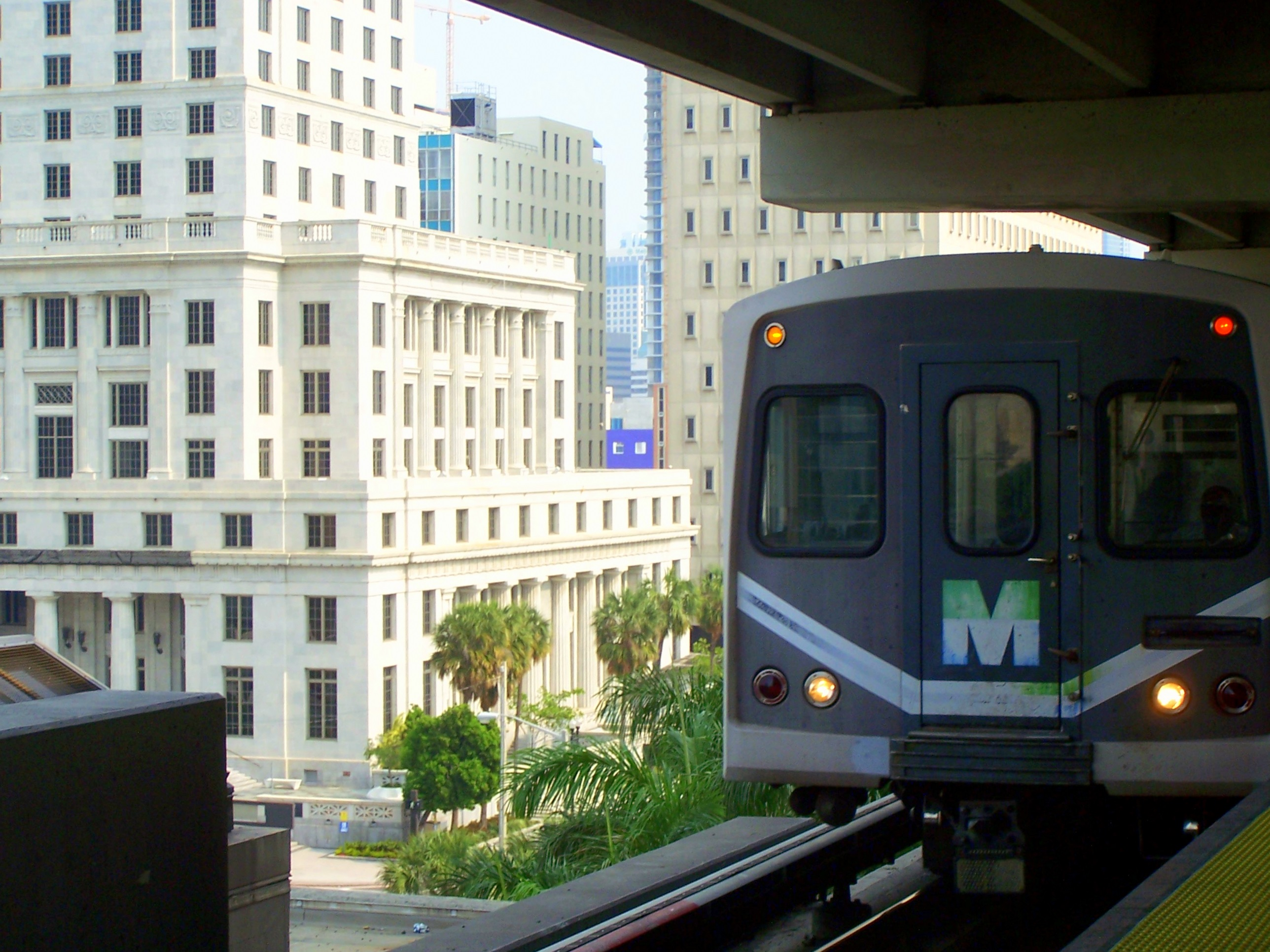
A Metrorail train is approaching the upper level of the Government Center station with the Dade County Courthouse in the background.

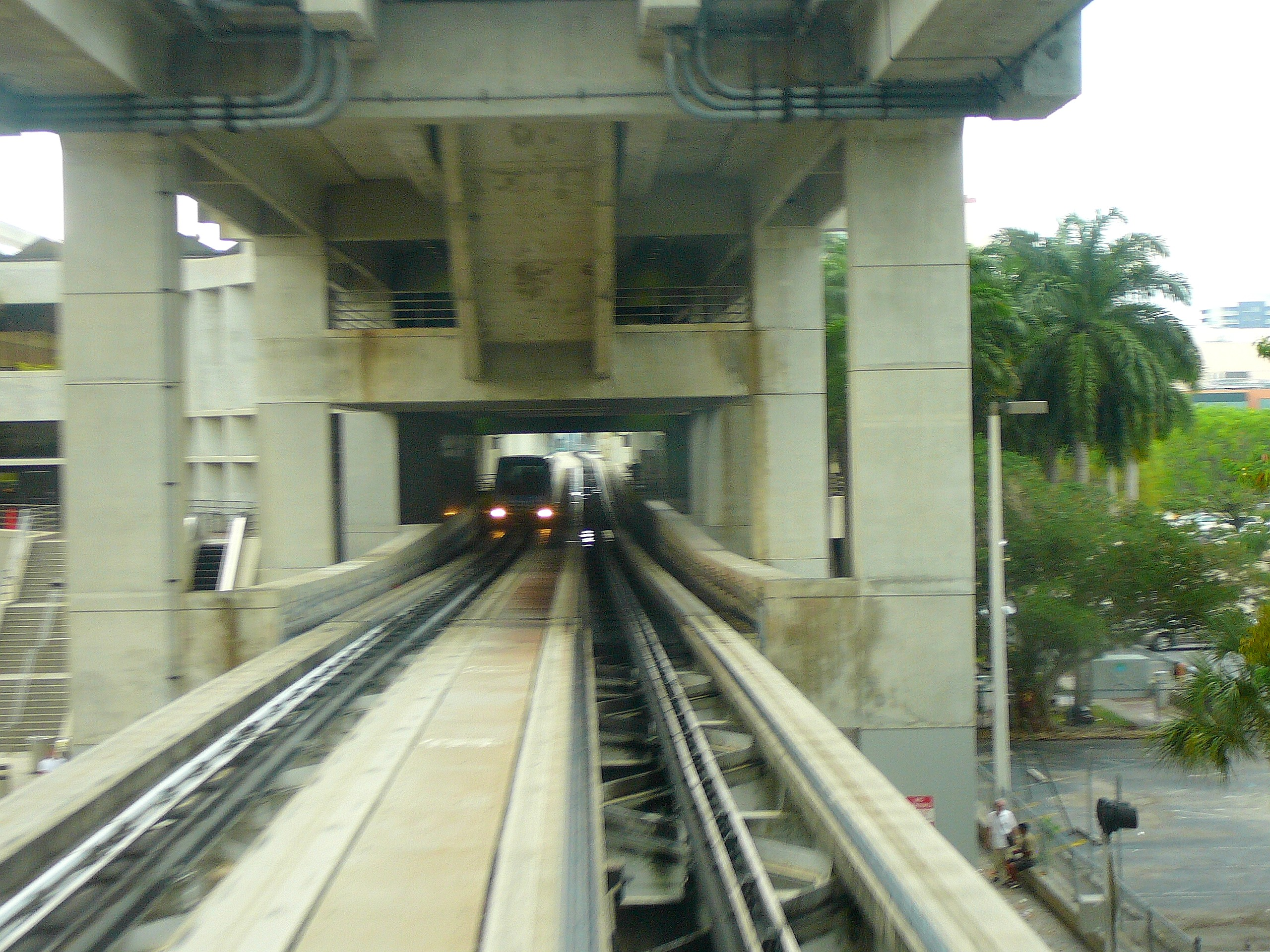
The Government Center Metromover transfer station

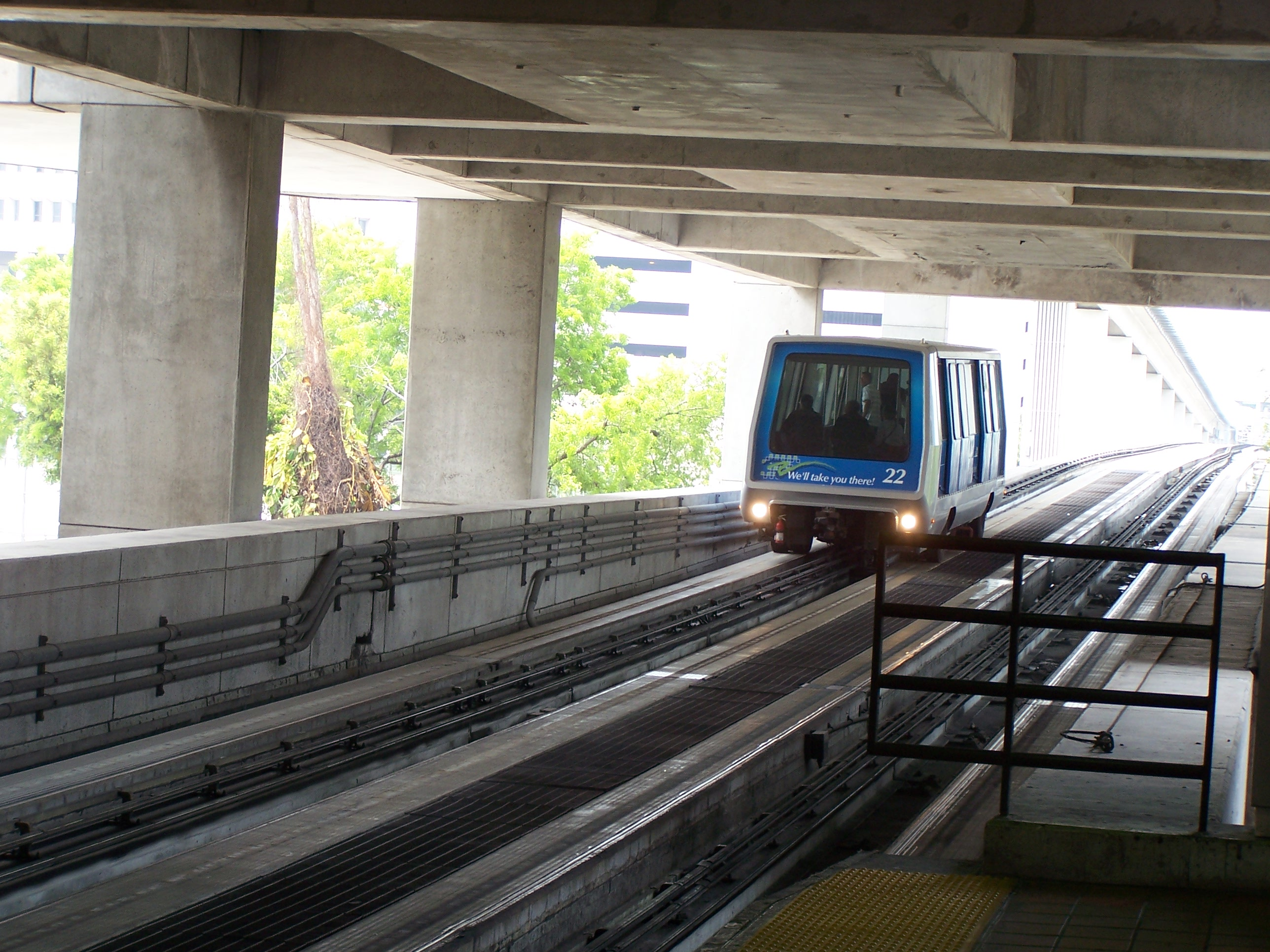
A Metromover train is approaching Government Center station

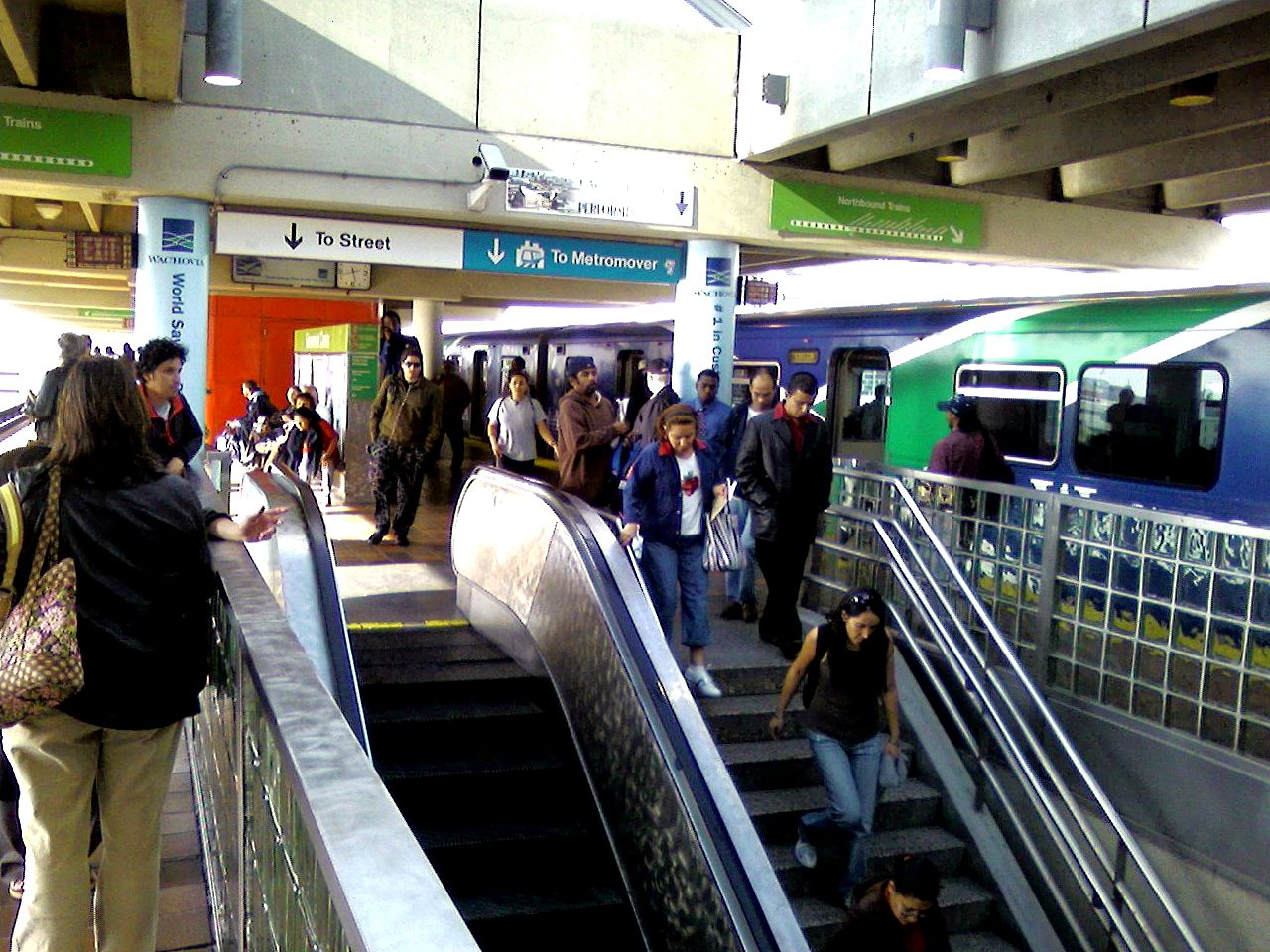
Passengers exit a northbound Metrorail train during rush hour

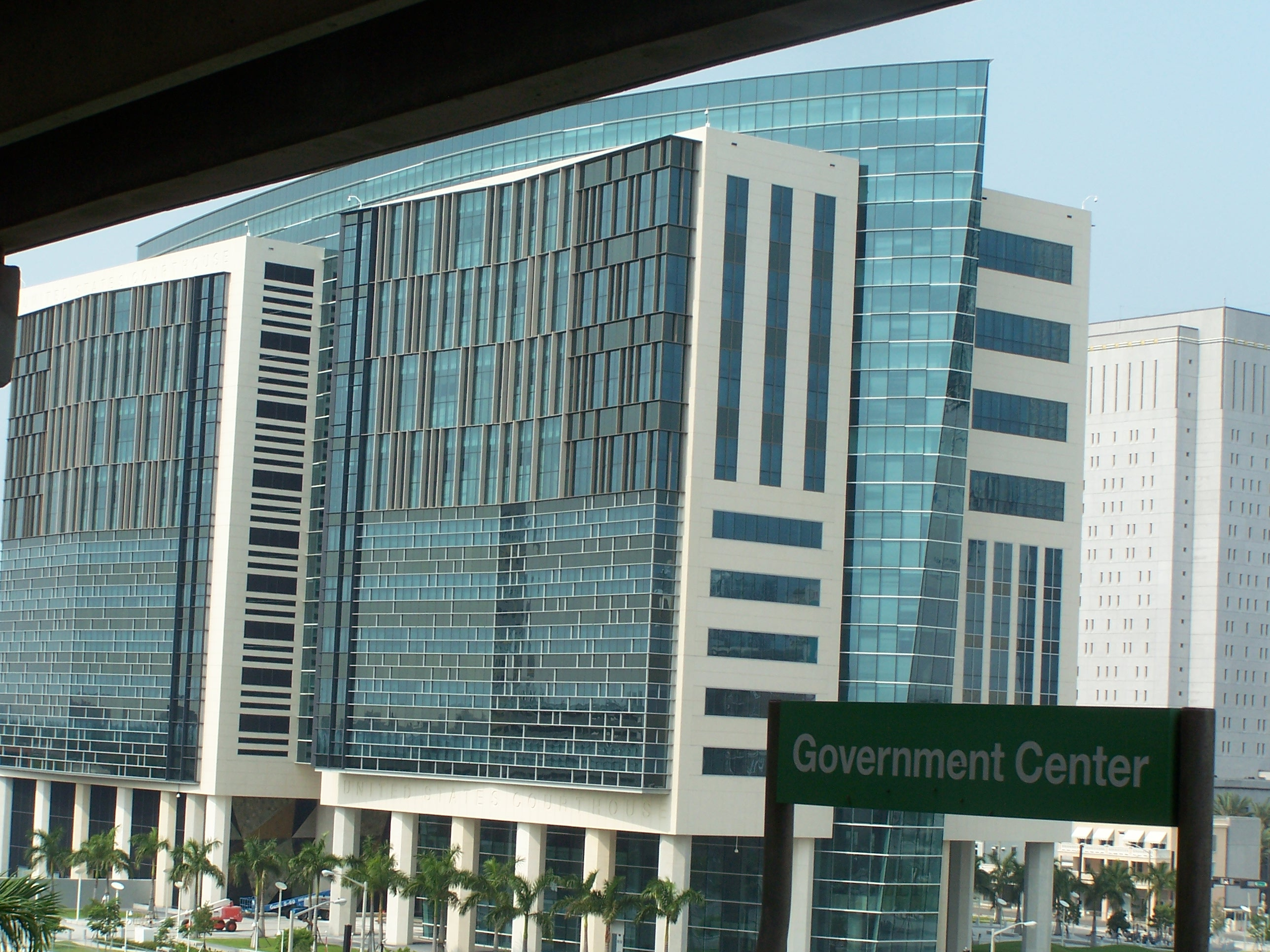
Platforms overlooking the contemporary US Courthouse building.

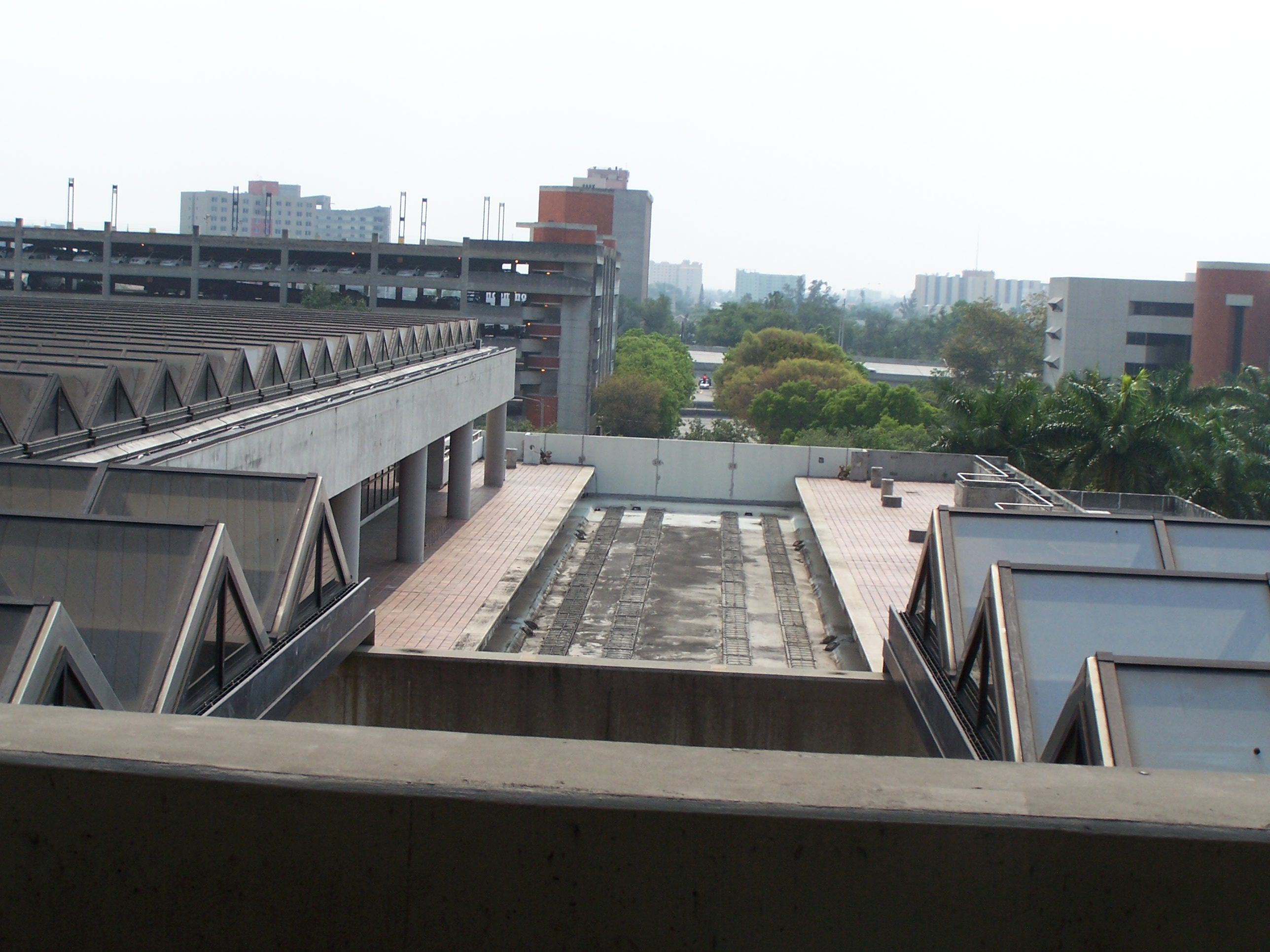
The ghost platform that is on the mezzanine level

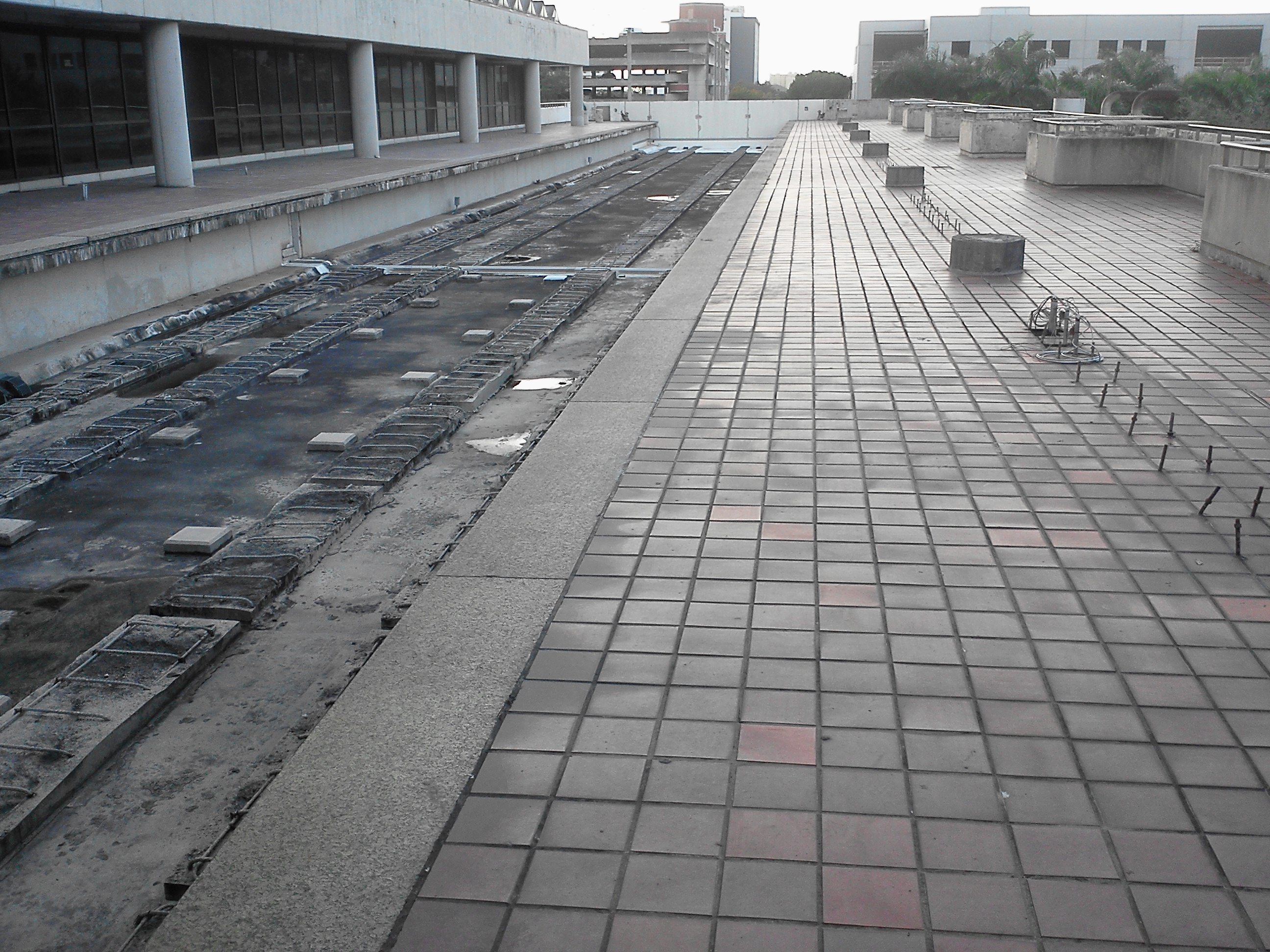
A closer view of the ghost platform

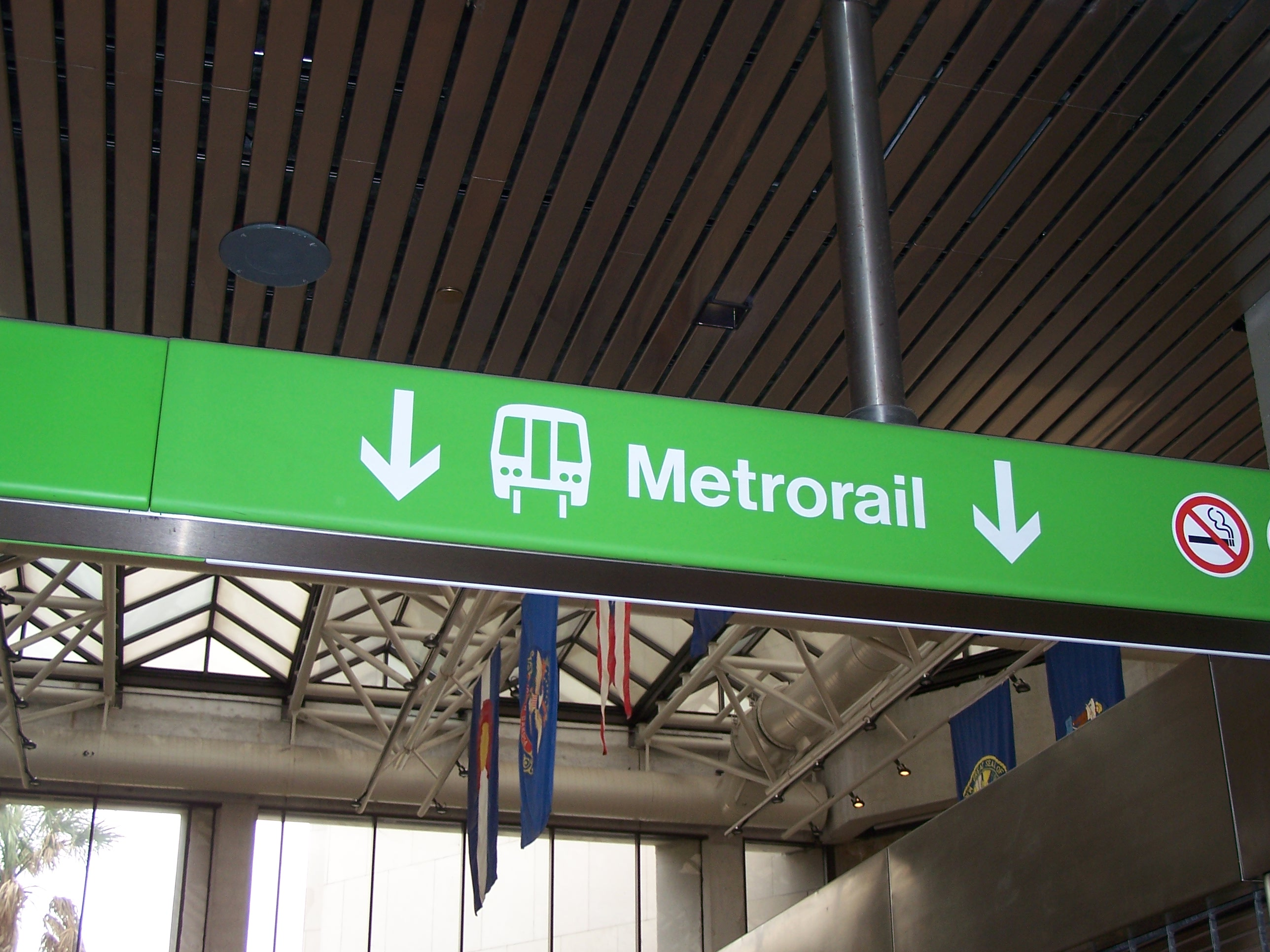
A Metrorail sign in the plaza

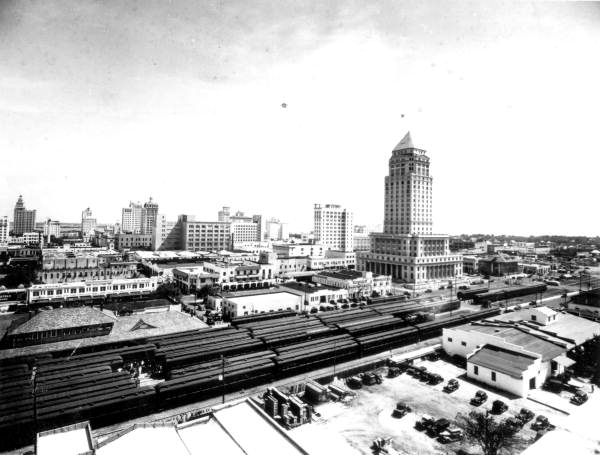
View toward the southeast of the city center, with the FEC passenger trains and the Dade County Courthouse foreground, circa 1930s

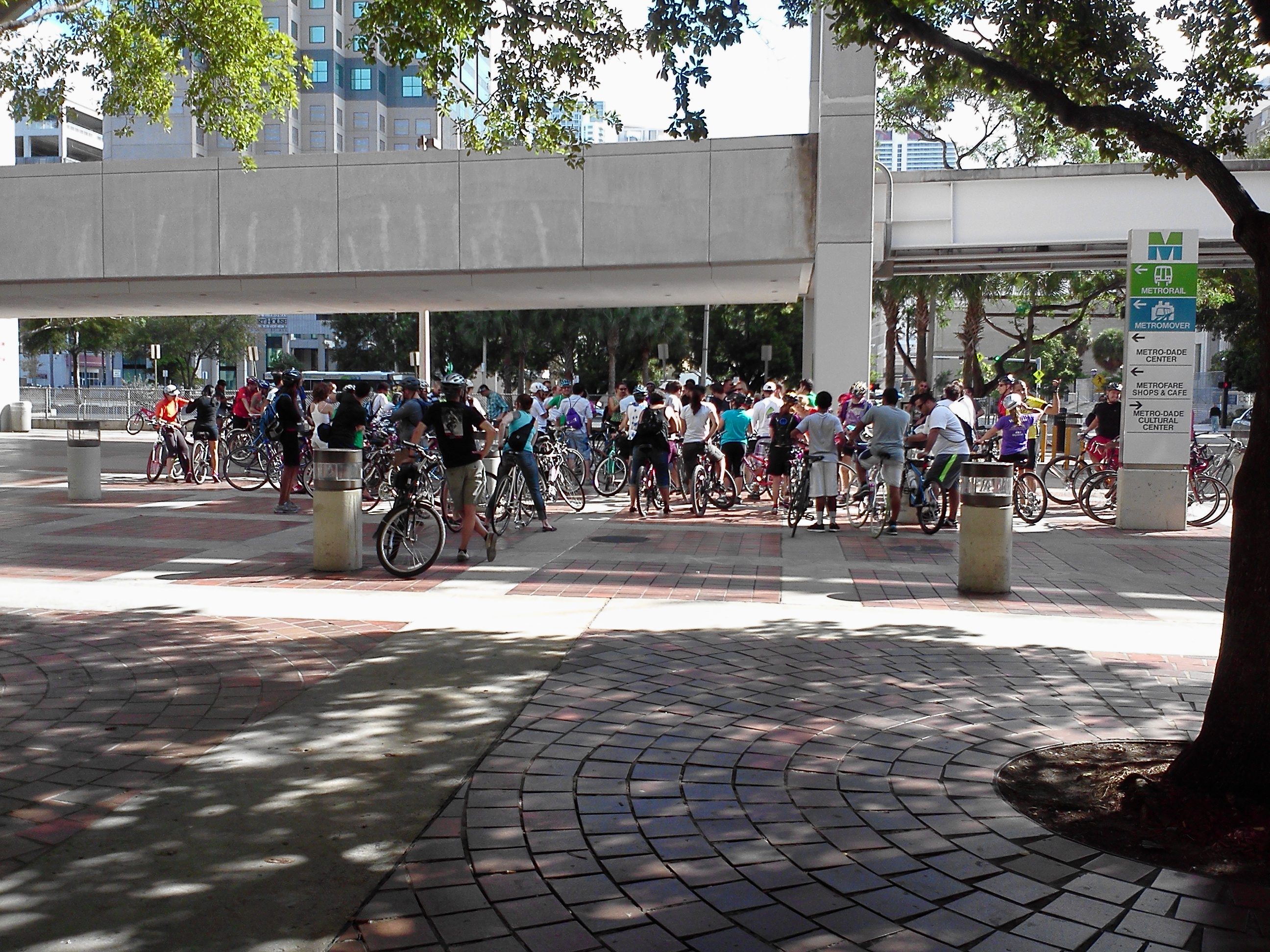
Critical Mass Miami assembling at Government Center

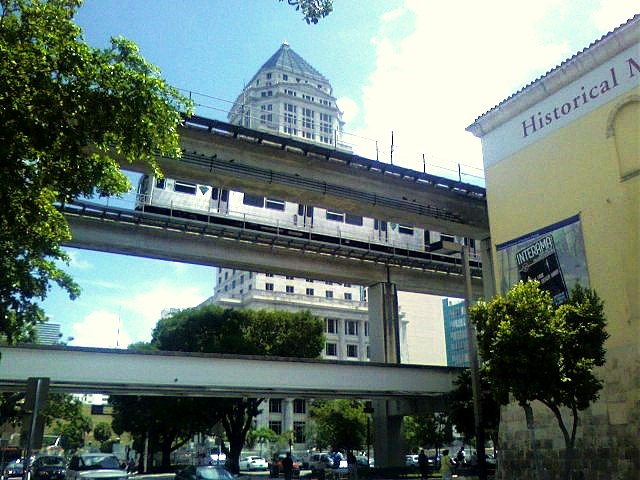
Government Center with the Dade County Courthouse in the background and HistoryMiami in the foreground on the right

== See also ==
- Transportation in South Florida
