= Government Plaza =

Government Plaza can refer to:

- Government Plaza, Binghamton, a government office complex in Binghamton, New York, USA.
- Government Plaza station, a light rail station in Minneapolis, Minnesota, USA.
- Government Campus Plaza, a government complex in Port of Spain, Trinidad and Tobago.
- Mobile Government Plaza, a government complex in Mobile, Alabama, USA.

== See also ==
- Government Center (disambiguation)
