= Courthouse Center =

Courthouse Center can refer to:

== United States ==
On the National Register of Historic Places:

- Courthouse Center (Newark, Ohio)

Others:

- Courthouse Center (Miami, Florida)
