= Museum Tower (Miami) =

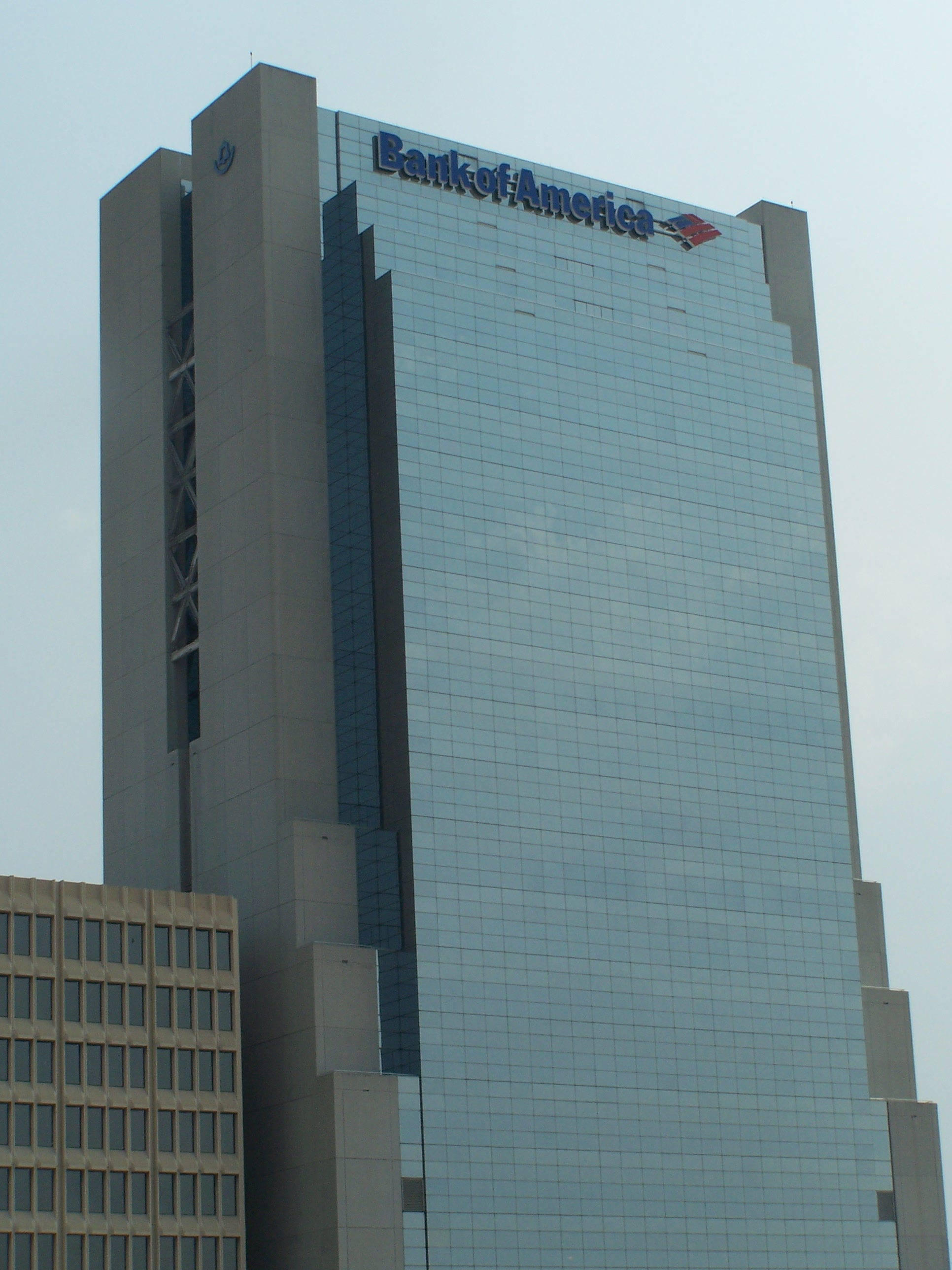
- Museum Tower from the Government Center Station
- Interactive map of the Museum Tower area

General information
- Type: Office
- Location: 150 West Flagler Street, Government Center, Downtown Miami, Florida; United States
- Coordinates: 25.77362°N 80.19707°W
- Construction started: 1983
- Completed: 1986
- Opening: April, 1987
- Operator: Bridge Investment Group

Height
- Roof: 377 ft (114.9 m)

Technical details
- Floor count: 29

Design and construction
- Architects: Spillis Candela & Partners, Inc.
- Developer: Codina Group and Prudential Financial, Inc.
- Main contractor: Southeast Banking Corp.

The Museum Tower is a high-rise office building located in the Government Center district of Downtown Miami, Florida, United States. As its name implies, the building is situated across the street from HistoryMiami (and the former Miami Art Museum), which are both part of the Miami Cultural Plaza. The visibility of Museum Tower from I-95 provides it a valuable location.

The building has 29 stories and stands at a height of 377 feet (115 m). The Museum Tower is used completely as class A office space.

The building, still under construction, appears in a scene (at 00:45:42) from the 1986 film Aladdin, starring Bud Spencer.
