= Government Center station =

Government Center station may refer to:

- Government Center station (GRTC), a BRT stop in Richmond, Virginia, United States
- Government Center station (MBTA), a subway station in Boston, Massachusetts, United States
- Government Center station (Miami), an intermodal transit station in Miami, Florida, United States
- Government Centre station, a light rail station in Edmonton, Alberta, Canada
