= Miami-Dade County Courthouse =

- U.S. National Register of Historic Places
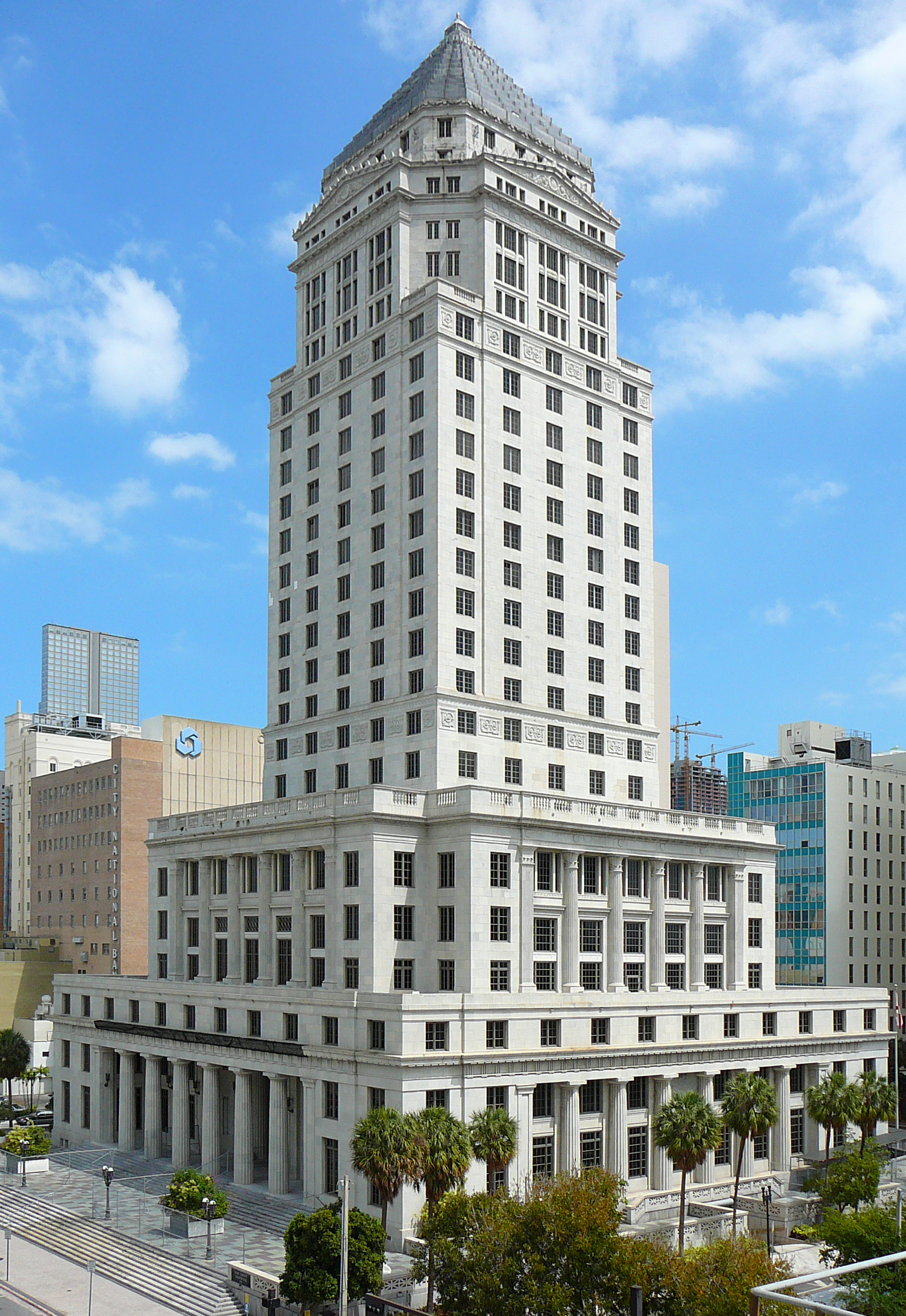
- Miami-Dade County Courthouse

- Location within Miami Location within Florida Location within the United States
- Interactive map showing the location for Miami-Dade County Courthouse
- Location: Miami, Florida
- Coordinates: 25°46′28.6″N 80°11′42.5″W
- Built: 1928; 98 years ago
- Architect: A. Ten Eyck Brown and August Geiger
- Architectural style: Classical Revival
- MPS: Downtown Miami MRA
- NRHP reference No.: 88002983
- Added to NRHP: January 4, 1989

The Miami-Dade County Courthouse, formerly known as the Dade County Courthouse, is a historic courthouse and skyscraper located at 73 West Flagler Street in Miami, Florida. Constructed over four years (1925–28), it was added to the U.S. National Register of Historic Places on January 4, 1989. The building is 361 feet (110 m) tall with 28 floors. When it was built, it was the tallest building the city of Miami, state of Florida, and tallest south of the Mason-Dixon line.

It is still in use as the main civil courthouse of Miami-Dade County, though a new courthouse is being built nearby to be completed by 2025.

== History ==
When county government was established following the Civil War, public records were sparse. Thus, whichever location the county's chief office holder decided to do business was the de facto courthouse.

In 1890, Dade County's first courthouse stood in the town of Juno, Florida some 10 mi (16 km) north of West Palm Beach. At the time, Dade County covered more territory than it does today, stretching from Bahia Honda Key, in the middle Keys, up to the St. Lucie River, near present-day Port St. Lucie.

Juno was chosen as the county seat because of its strategic location at the southern terminus of the Jupiter-Juno railroad. Juno also held the northern terminus of the boat and connecting stagecoach line to Miami. The courthouse remained in Juno (now no longer in existence) until 1899, when it was moved to Miami down the inland waterway on a barge and was placed on the banks of the Miami River, east of the old Miami Avenue bridge.

The building was a two-story wooden-frame construction, housing offices and jail cells on the ground floor and a courtroom on the second floor. It has a Neoclassical design, in 1904 this building was replaced by a new courthouse building situated on Flagler Street (then known as Twelfth Street). It was a magnificent building constructed of limestone, having an elegant red-domed top, at the cost of $47,000. It was anticipated that this courthouse would serve the city for at least 50 years; however, no one was prepared for the rapid growth Miami experienced during this period, and by 1924, only twenty years later, there was serious talk of the need for a larger courthouse.

In the early 1920s, architect A. Ten Eyck Brown entered a design competition for Atlanta City Hall, which was rejected. He then made the plans available to Dade County, and City and County officials readily approved them. It was decided by the officials to build the new courthouse at the same location as the existing one on Flagler Street. Construction began in 1925, with workers erecting the new building around the existing structure, which was then dismantled. Community leaders and citizens alike voiced excitement over the new 28-story skyscraper that would soon dominate the skyline.

Unexpectedly, construction was halted when the building reached ten stories. It was discovered that the high-rise was sinking into the spongy ground. Engineers consulted with an architect from Mexico City, who had encountered a similar problem while building the Palacio de Bellas Artes opera house. The consultant determined that the foundation pilings were not set deep enough. To correct the problem, cement supports were poured, which take up much of the space in the building's basement file room even to this day.

The courthouse was finally completed in 1928 at the cost of $4 million (USD 2013 $54.5 million). Initially, it served as the Dade County Courthouse and Jail, and the Miami City Hall. The jail occupied the top nine floors as it was thought that prisoners would not risk escaping from such a height, either directly down or through multiple guarded staircases and elevators. This theory was disproven in 1934, when a 21st floor prisoner picked the lock of his jail cell window and used a fire hose to lower himself to freedom. In the years following, more than 70 prisoners escaped from what was thought to be a secure and escape-proof jail.

For many years, the courthouse, at an elevation of 360 feet, was reputed to be the tallest building south of Baltimore. It was the county's first high-rise and is in the National Register of Historic Places. Efforts to refurbish this magnificent structure and restore it to its original grandeur have been underway since 1981 by Architect James W. Piersol, AIA of M.C Harry Associates Architects of Miami. The restoration and renovations initially stabilized the terra cotta facade, and installed new life safety systems. In 1982, the idea of restoring the lobby to its original distinction was the passion of both Architect James Piersol and engineer Don Youatt, of the Miami-Dade Planning and Development Department. With a little less than half of the funding necessary for the lobby restoration project in hand ($300,000 grant approved by the Legislature in 1996), the Dade County Bar Association acted as the fund-raising umbrella and initiated a drive to raise the remainder needed from lawyers and the general public. A few years later, the same team restored Courtroom 6-1, which had been the site of many infamous trials over the years.

== Recent history and 2024 replacement ==
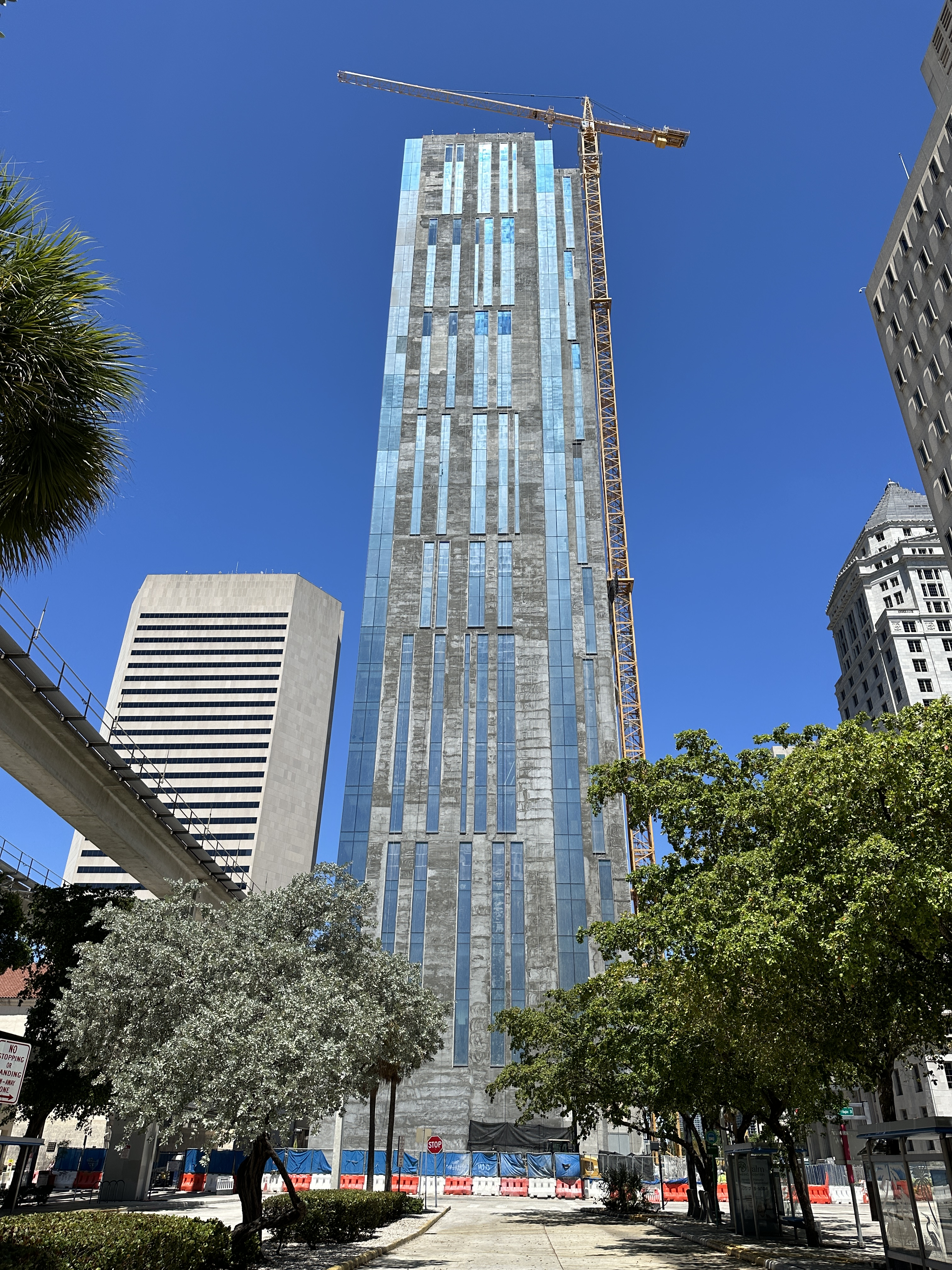
Southern façade of the new county courthouse under construction in 2024. The old courthouse is to the right and the Stephen P. Clark Government Center building is to the left.

Today, the courthouse provides offices, chambers, and courtrooms for the clerks and judiciary assigned to both the Circuit and County Civil Court.

On July 9, 2021, the courthouse was closed down after an engineer reported "safety concerns with various floors", and staff members were directed to work remotely. The inspection report was made in the wake of the deadly collapse of a condominium building in nearby Surfside. In the years prior to the closure, the structural safety of the courthouse building had been the center of complaints by resident judges and lawyers, even as county administrators consistently declared it safe following various "spot repairs". At the time of the closure, Miami-Dade County was planning the construction of a replacement building and the selling of the original courthouse.

A new county courthouse tower was completed adjacent to the historic building in 2025. It has over 600,000 square feet (56,000 square meters) of floor space in a 478-foot (146 m) tower with 25 storeys.

== Gallery ==
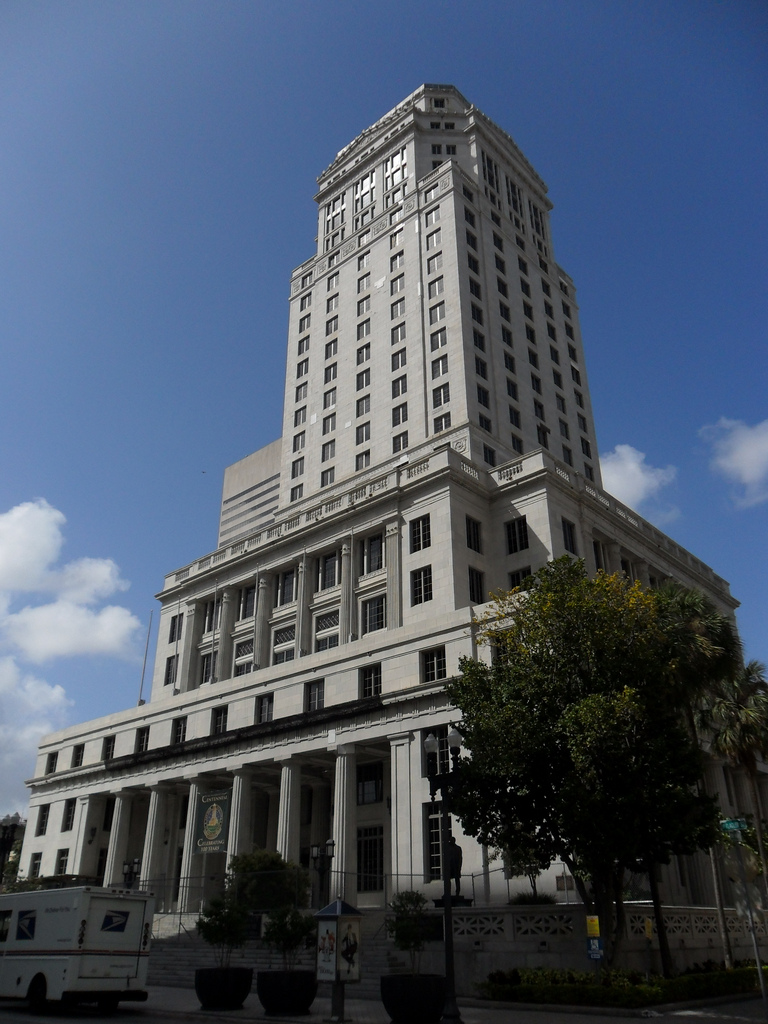
Southwest view of the Miami-Dade courthouse in 2011

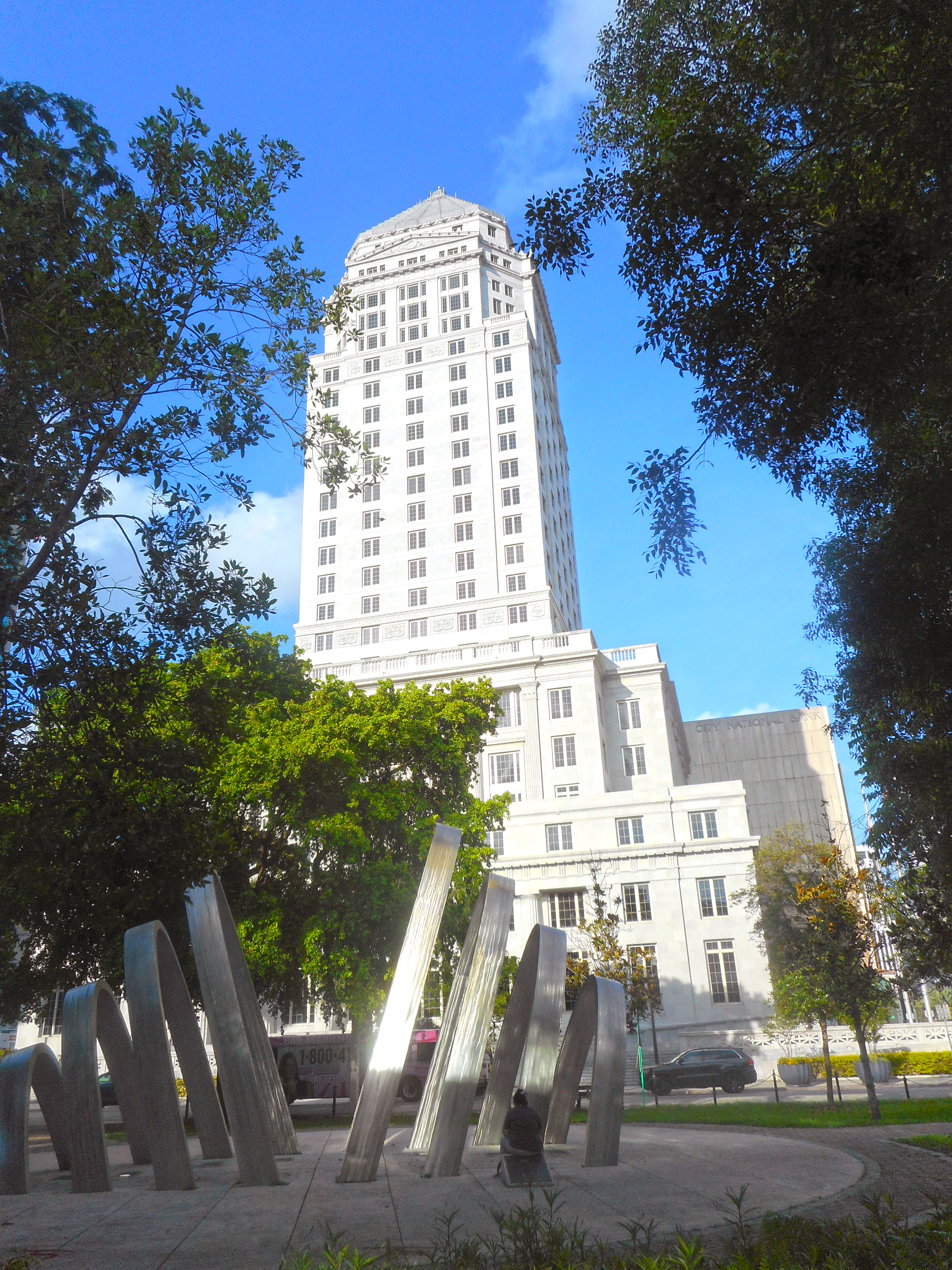
Seen from the east

== See also ==
- List of tallest buildings in Miami

Records
Preceded by Freedom Tower	Tallest Building in Miami; 1928–1972; 110m	Succeeded by One Biscayne Tower
Preceded by Coral Gables Biltmore Hotel	Tallest Building in Florida; 1928–1965; 110m	Succeeded by Vehicle Assembly Building
