= Law Enforcement Officers' Memorial High School =

Coordinates: 25°46′39″N 80°11′54″W

Location
- 300 N.W. 2nd Avenue; Downtown Miami, Florida 33128; United States

Information
- School type: Public, Magnet
- Established: 2009
- School district: Miami-Dade County Public Schools
- Principal: Tony Ullivarri
- Grades: 9-12
- Enrollment: 412 (2016-17)
- Average class size: 18
- Hours in school day: 7:20 A.M. - 2:20 P.M.
- Campus type: Urban
- Colors: Dark Blue,
- Mascot: Warriors
- Newspaper: The Warrior Chronicle
- Website: schoolofjustice.org

Law Enforcement Officers' Memorial High School is a secondary school in Downtown Miami, Florida that opened in 2009 with a class of new freshmen. The school has three magnet academies: Homeland Security, Forensic Science, & Law Studies. The school offers many advanced programs such as Advanced Placement and Dual enrollment with some freshmen already being enrolled in Chemistry and Algebra II. Law Enforcement was named a Magnet School of Excellence by Magnet Schools of America for its commitment to high academic standards, curriculum innovation and the delivery of a high quality education. Law Enforcement Officers' Memorial High School is nationally ranked by U.S. News & World as one of the best schools in America. It has been consecutively ranked an A school and is part of the Miami Dade County Public Schools magnet program.

== Admissions ==
As a school of choice, Law Enforcement requires a minimum GPA of 2.0 in core academic classes, a 2.0 GPA in conduct, and effort grades of 2 or higher on a 3-point scale. Applicants who wish to enter the Forensic Science strand must have taken and successfully completed Algebra I prior to their freshman year. No more than 10 unexcused absences will be permissible for admissions.

== Academics ==
Law Enforcement has an alternating four-block schedule, with a total of eight class periods. Two of these periods must be a course from the student's respective academy, and two must consist of one mathematics and one science course. Students may select either one or two elective courses, depending on whether they are taking a social studies class that year.

More than 10 Advanced Placement classes are offered across a variety of subjects, including Spanish Language/Spanish Literature, Chemistry, Environmental Science, World History, United States History, Psychology, United States Government and Politics etc.

=== Dual Enrollment ===
Students who qualify may participate in the Dual enrollment Program where they take college courses at Miami Dade College (Wolfson Campus). The college courses are created specifically for LEOMHS students and are respective to their academy. Students may graduate with a certification in Crime Scene Technology, Paralegal Studies or Homeland Security from Miami Dade College if they successfully pass the required courses needed for the certificate. Students may also participate in the early admissions program their senior year where student enroll at Miami Dade College on a full-time basis and take courses that are creditable towards a high school diploma and an Associate of Arts degree.

=== Internships ===
Students who qualify may choose to gain real world experience by participating in an executive internship during their senior year. Students intern in several employers related to their academy such as Baptist Hospital of Miami, City of Coral Gables Police Department, the State Attorney's Office Investigations Department, etc.

== Demographics ==
Law Enforcement is 26% Black, 66% Hispanic (of any race), and 6% White non-Hispanic.
