= Government Campus Plaza =

Coordinates: 10.6521°N 61.5140°W

The Government Campus Plaza is a government complex on Richmond Street and Wrightson Road in Port of Spain, Trinidad and Tobago. Completed in May 2017, the Government Campus Plaza provides public access to the services of four major government ministries and agencies.

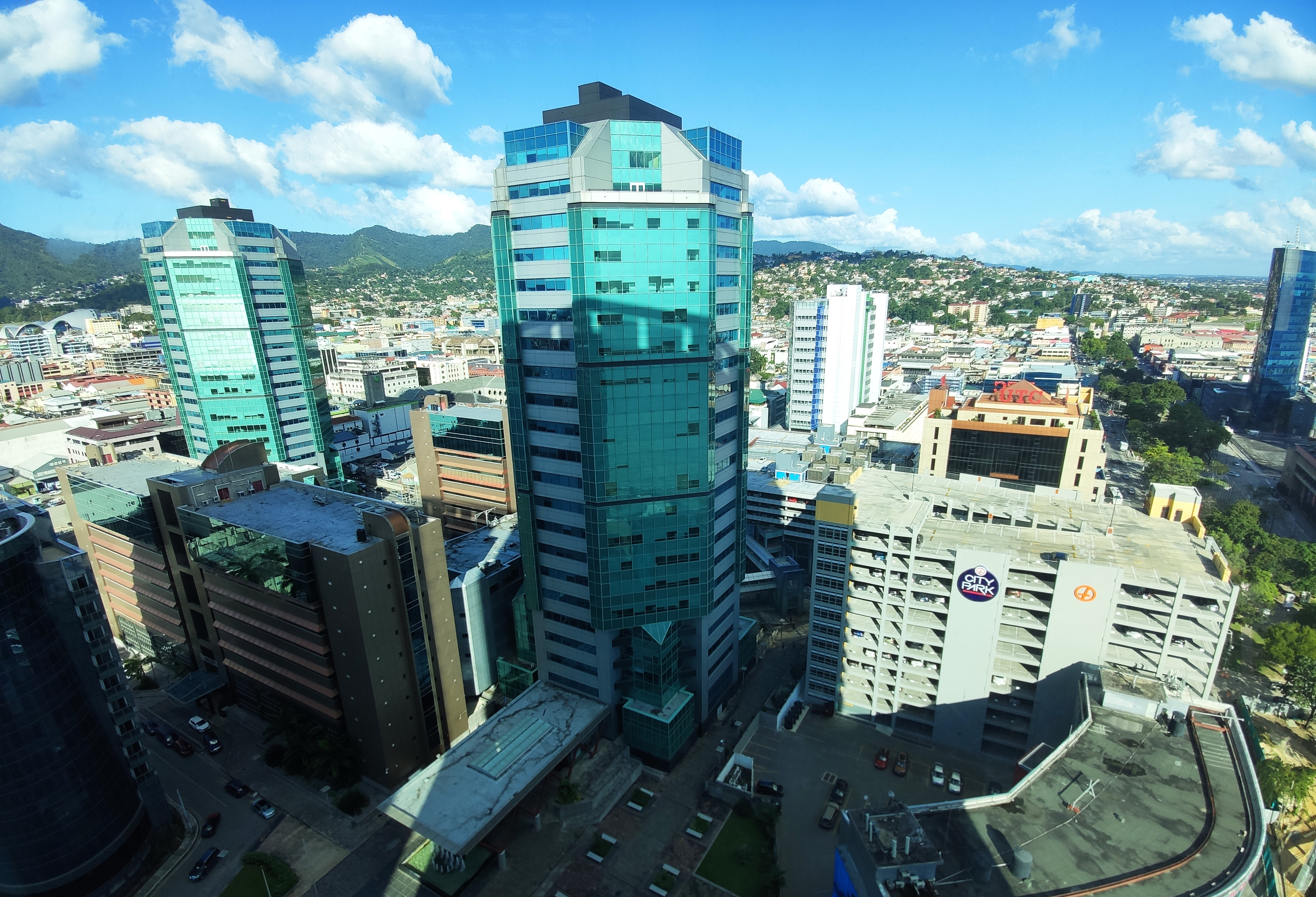

Across from the POS International Waterfront Centre on Wrightson Road on a 1,154,000 sq ft (107,200 m^{2}) quadrangular piazza, the Government Campus Plaza provides office accommodation, parking, and a public plaza with manicured gardens and entertainment space. In the plaza, just below the outdoor 40 ft × 70 ft (12 m × 21 m) screen mounted on one of the plaza's two 23-storey towers, is an outdoor performance area for cultural festivals and performances.

== Facilities ==
The complex consists of:

- The Inland Revenue Division (IRD) Tower (23-storeys)
- The Customs and Excise Headquarters Building (10-storeys)
- Ministry of National Security Immigration Division Building (10-storeys)
- The Ministry of the Attorney General and Legal Affairs (AGLA) Tower (23-storeys)
- The Government Campus Plaza Parkade

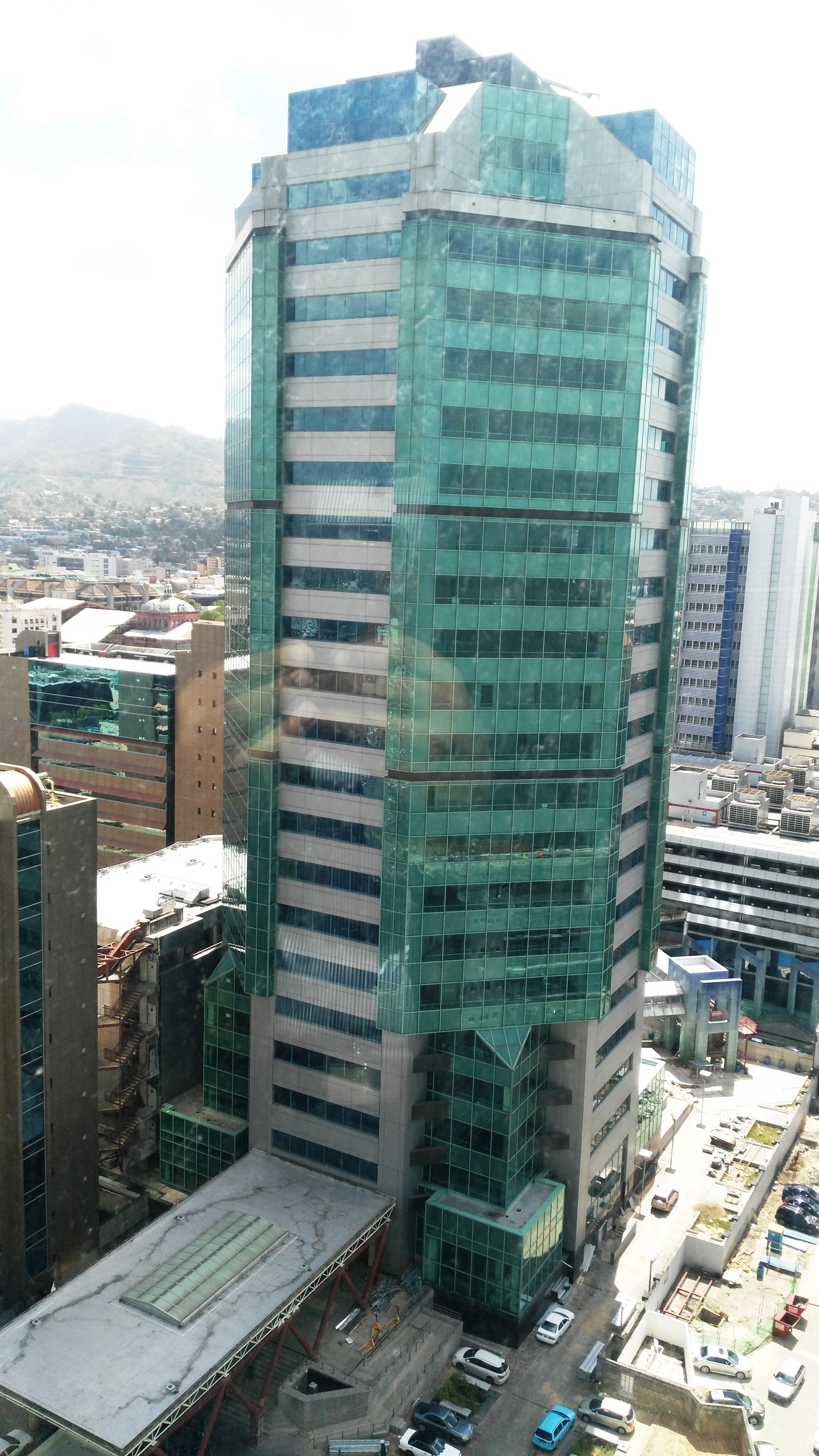
BIR Tower
