= Museum of Miami =

Museum in Miami, Florida

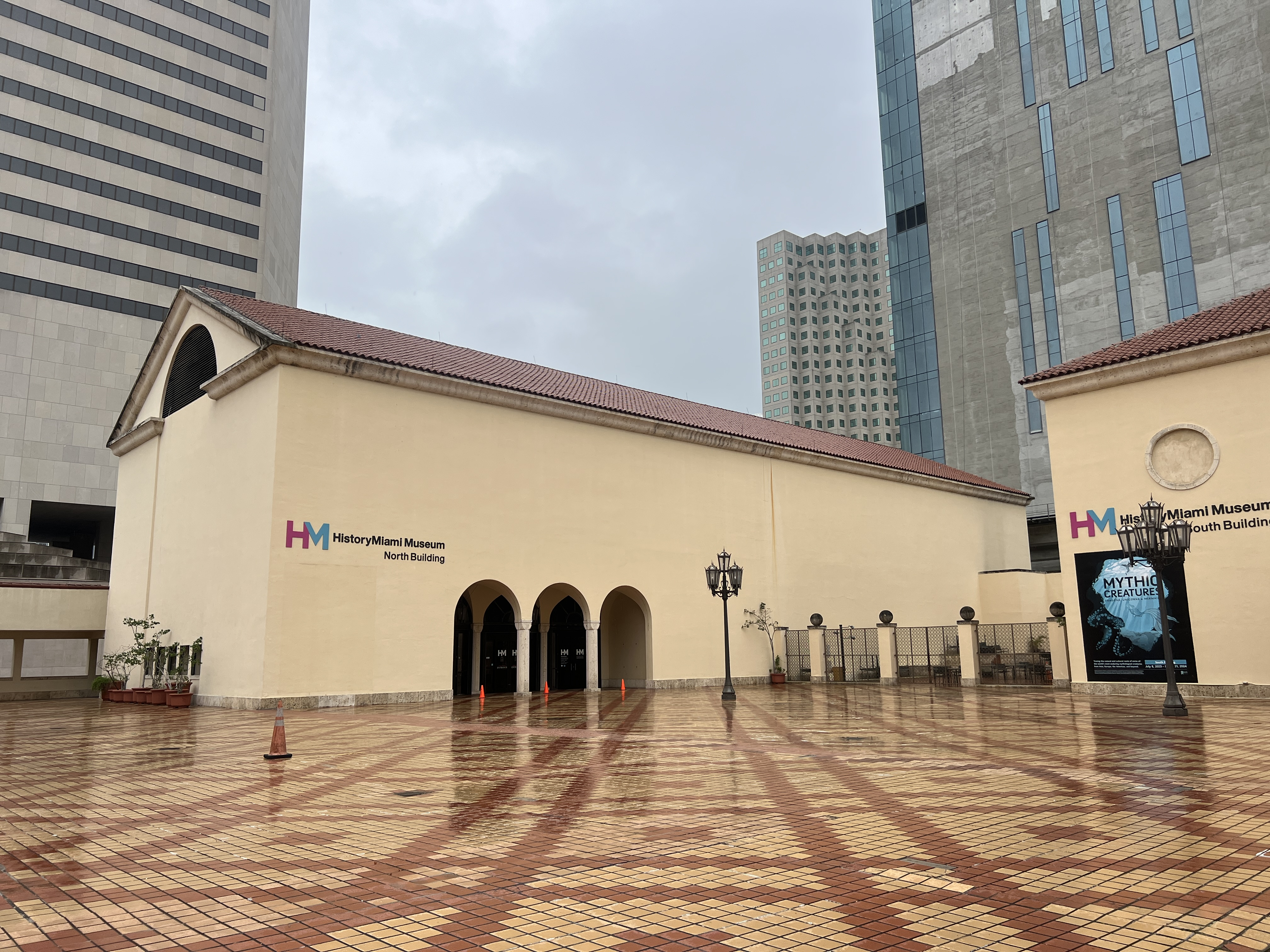

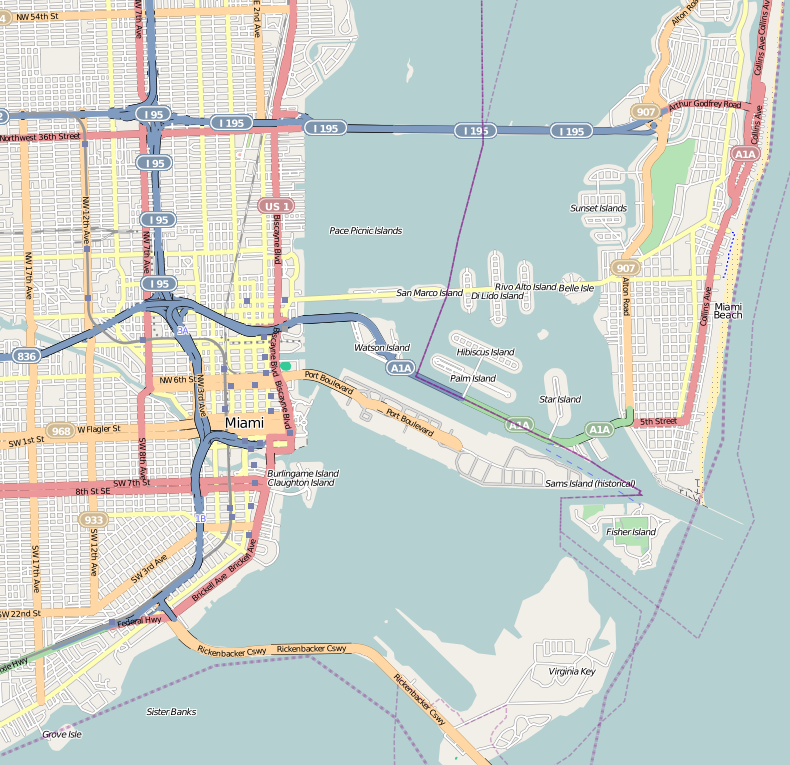
- Location in Downtown Miami Museum of Miami (Florida)
- Former name: HistoryMiami
- Established: 1940
- Location: 101 W Flagler St; Miami, FL 33130
- Coordinates: 25.7747°N 80.1963°W
- Public transit access: Government Center
- Website: www.museumofmiami.org

Museum of Miami, formerly known as HistoryMiami Museum, is a museum located in Downtown Miami, Florida, United States. Museum of Museum is the largest museum for history, culture, and community in the State of Florida. Museum of Miami houses four permanent galleries and up to three traveling exhibits, Archives and Research Center, the South Florida Folklife Center, the Education Center, and City Tours program.

Founded as the Historical Museum of Southern Florida in 1940, Museum of Miami is the oldest continuously running cultural institution in South Florida, and is a Smithsonian affiliate. It was accredited by the American Alliance of Museums in 1979.

The Society opened its first museum in 1962. After moving twice, the museum has been located in the Miami-Dade Cultural Center since 1984. The Society and Museum were renamed in HistoryMiami in 2010. In 2014 the museum more than doubled its space when took over the space formerly occupied by the Miami Art Museum in the cultural center. The museum operates a non-circulating library, conducts city tours, and has educated more than 500,000 students in the area's rich history. In 2026, the Museum rebranded to Museum of Miami.

Museum of Miami programs include exhibitions, city tours, education, research, collections and publications on the importance of the past in shaping Miami's future.

== Description ==
Located in the Miami-Dade Cultural Plaza in Miami, Florida, the museum is a 70,000 ft^{2} (6,500 m^{2}) facility and home to more than one million historic images and 30,000 three-dimensional artifacts, including a 1920s trolley car, gold and silver recovered from 17th- and 18th-century shipwrecks, artifacts from Pan American World Airways, and rafts that brought refugees to Miami.

One of the museum's permanent exhibitions, Tropical Dreams: A People’s History of South Florida, covers 12,000 years of history and examines the development of the region and its people against key historic events, including early Native American settlement, the Spanish Exploration period, and World War II up to the present. A world-class temporary exhibit was on display from June 5, 2015 to January 17 2016, Operation Pedro Pan: The Cuban Children’s Exodus, which explores the largest recorded child refuge in the Western Hemisphere through historic images, oral histories and personal items, such as letters and photographs. Museum of Miami also includes the Archives and Research Center, which contains historic photos and documents useful to scholars, distant learners, industry professionals. The lower level has classrooms used for educational programming and lectures, administrative offices, and part of the museum's object collection.

The museum is also the official repository for all archaeological material recovered in Miami-Dade County.

Museum of Miami has published Tequesta, an annual scholarly journal, since 1941. The journal covers topics about the history of South Florida. Subjects span from pre-Columbian to late 20th-century history. The journal features scholarly studies as well as personal narratives.

== Notable staff ==
- Jorge Zamanillo (born 1969), executive director from 2016 to 2022

== See also ==
- Downtown Miami Historic District
- Lummus Park Historic District
- National Register of Historic Places listings in Miami, Florida
- Timeline of Miami, Florida history
