= Stephen P. Clark Government Center =

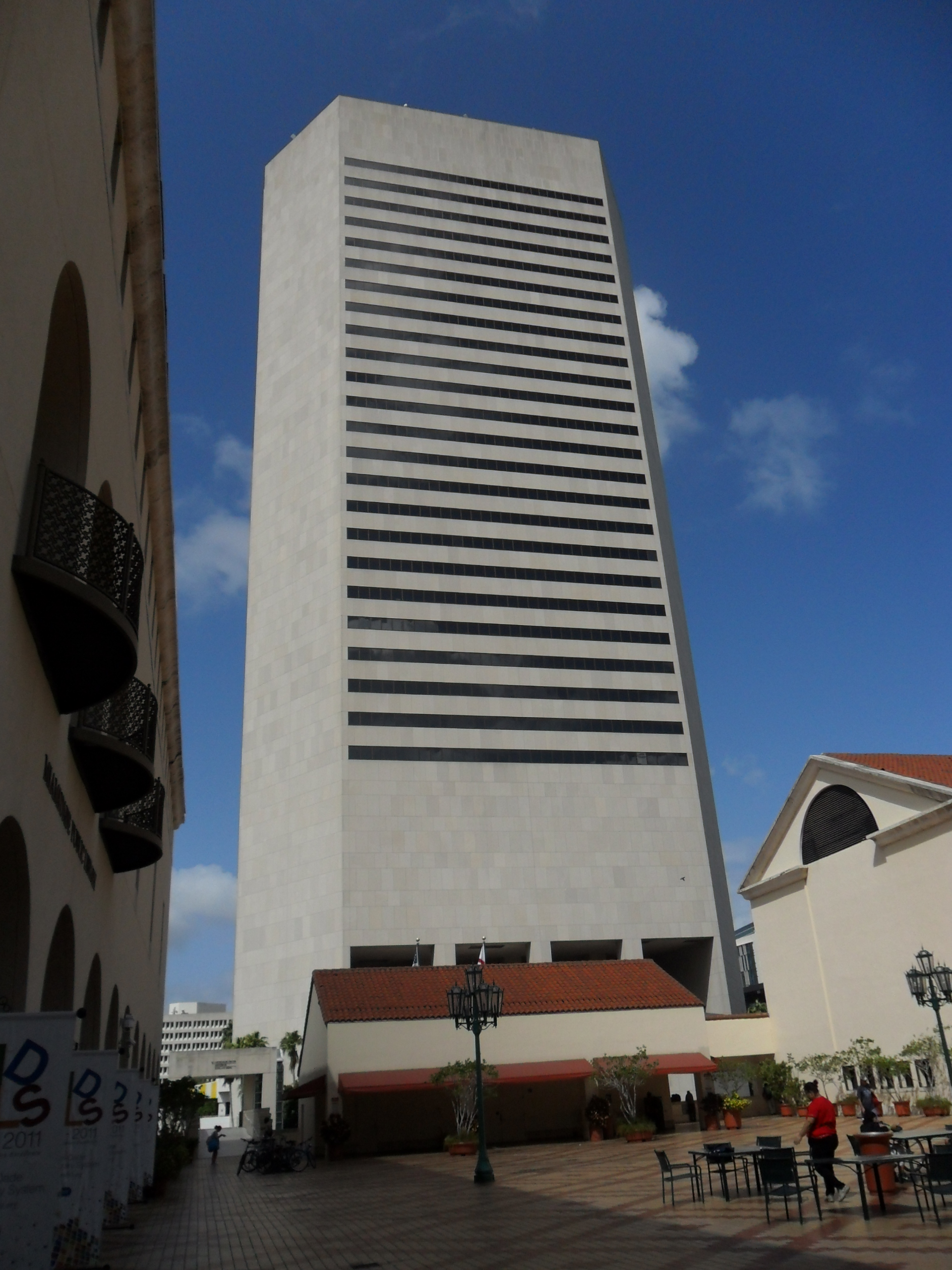
- Stephen P. Clark Government Center in Downtown Miami
- Interactive map of the Stephen P. Clark Government Center area

General information
- Type: Government
- Location: 111 Northwest 1st Street, Miami, Florida, United States
- Coordinates: 25.775558°N 80.196712°W
- Construction started: 1982
- Completed: 1985
- Opening: 1985

Height
- Roof: 510 ft (160 m)

Technical details
- Floor count: 28

Design and construction
- Architects: Hugh Stubbins and Associates
- Structural engineer: LeMessurier Consultants

The Stephen P. Clark Government Center, known also as Government Center, Miami-Dade Center, or County Hall, is a skyscraper in the Government Center district of Downtown Miami, Florida, United States. It is the headquarters building of the Miami-Dade County government. Many county offices are located in or near the building. The local and federal courthouses are located within five blocks of the building. The tower is 510 ft (155 m) tall, and has 28 stories. It has one of the highest height-to-floor ratios of any skyscraper, at 18.2 feet (5.5 m) per floor. The Government Center Metrorail station is located inside the building, giving it easy access to public transit. It is located in western downtown, on North First Street between West First and West Second Avenue. The building was completed in 1985. It is named after the former Mayor of Miami-Dade County and Mayor of Miami, Stephen P. Clark (1923-1996).

== See also ==
- Government of Miami-Dade County
- Government Center (MDT station)
- List of tallest buildings in Miami
