= Courthouse Center (Miami) =

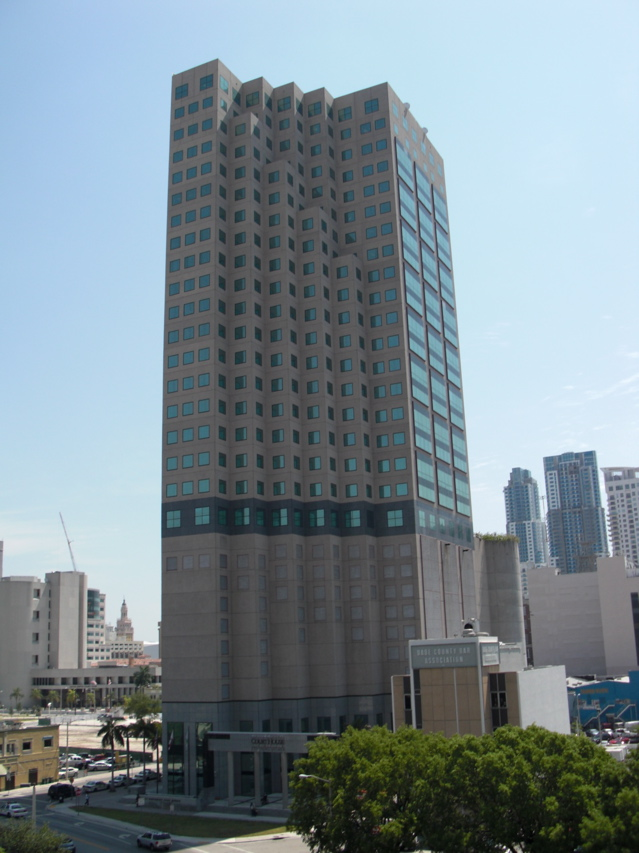
- Interactive map of the Courthouse Center area

General information
- Type: Government
- Location: Northwest 1st Avenue, Miami, Florida, United States
- Coordinates: 25°46′33″N 80°11′41″W
- Construction started: 1982
- Completed: 1986
- Opening: 1986

Height
- Roof: 405 ft (123 m)

Technical details
- Floor count: 30

Courthouse Center is a government office tower in Downtown Miami, Florida, United States. The Courthouse Center was built in 1986 and contains 100% office space. It has 30 floors, and is 405 ft (123 m) tall. The building's architecture is distinctly similar to Southeast Financial Center. The building is located in the Government Center district, on Northwest 1st Avenue. It is located in the western edge of Downtown.

== See also ==
- List of tallest buildings in Miami
