= Paramount Miami Worldcenter =

Residential skyscraper in Miami

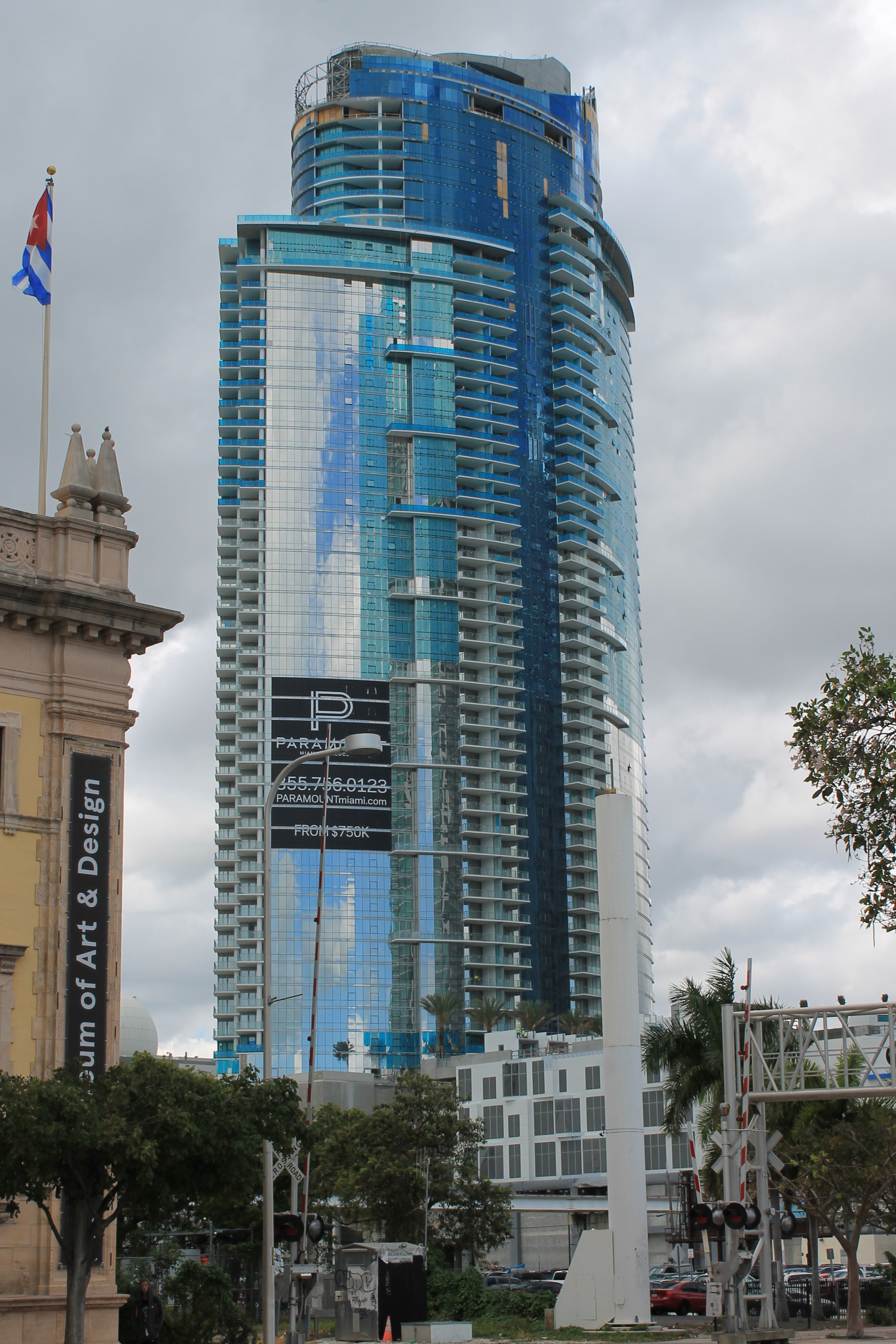
- Paramount Miami Worldcenter seen in March 2019, on the left is the freedom tower
- Interactive map of the Paramount Miami Worldcenter area

General information
- Status: Completed
- Type: Residential & Hotel
- Location: 851 NE 1st Avenue; Miami, FL 33132; United States
- Coordinates: 25°46′57″N 80°11′31″W
- Construction started: Spring 2016
- Completed: Aug 2019

Height
- Roof: 700 ft (210 m)

Technical details
- Floor count: 58

Design and construction
- Architect: Elkus Manfredi
- Developer: Paramount Ventures and Elkus Manfredi Architects

Paramount Miami Worldcenter is a 58-story condominium tower in the Miami Worldcenter complex. The building contains 569 residential units, as well as an extensive amenities deck, containing an outdoor soccer field, two tennis courts, bungalows, gardens, a rooftop observatory, resort-style pools, walking paths, a game room, an indoor basketball court, a boxing studio, a golf simulator, 26 pool-side cabanas, and a "skyport", a landing area for flying cars.

== History ==
Ground was broken on the $500 million project in early March 2016, as part of the wider Miami Worldcenter development. The building was designed by architecture firm Elkus Manfredi in collaboration with interior design firm IDDI and landscape architect DS Boca. By December 13, 2017 the building had reached the halfway point, at which time the structure had been 70% sold to buyers of over 48 nationalities. The building was topped out, at 700 feet, in early August 2018, with the milestone celebrated with over 50 flags adorning the top of the structure, representing the nationalities of those who had bought units in the building. In late July 2019, the building received a temporary certificate of occupancy, for units up to the 38th floor, allowing occupants to make preparations and begin moving into the structure. At this time, the building was 90% sold, with buyers from 56 countries.

== See also ==
- List of tallest buildings in Miami
- Downtown Miami
- List of tallest buildings in Florida
