= Park West (Miami) =

- Neighborhood of Miami
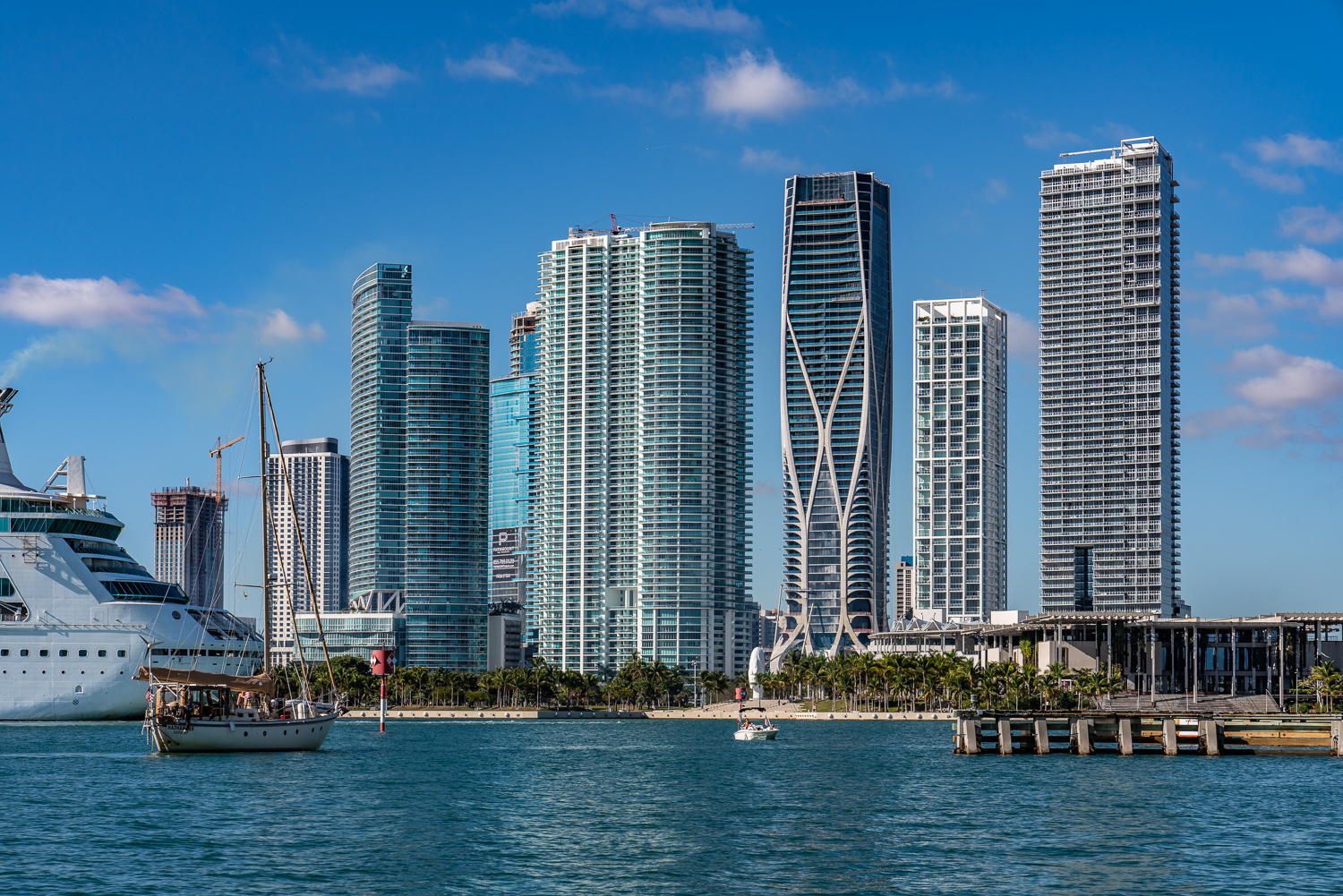
- Park West skyline, January 2019

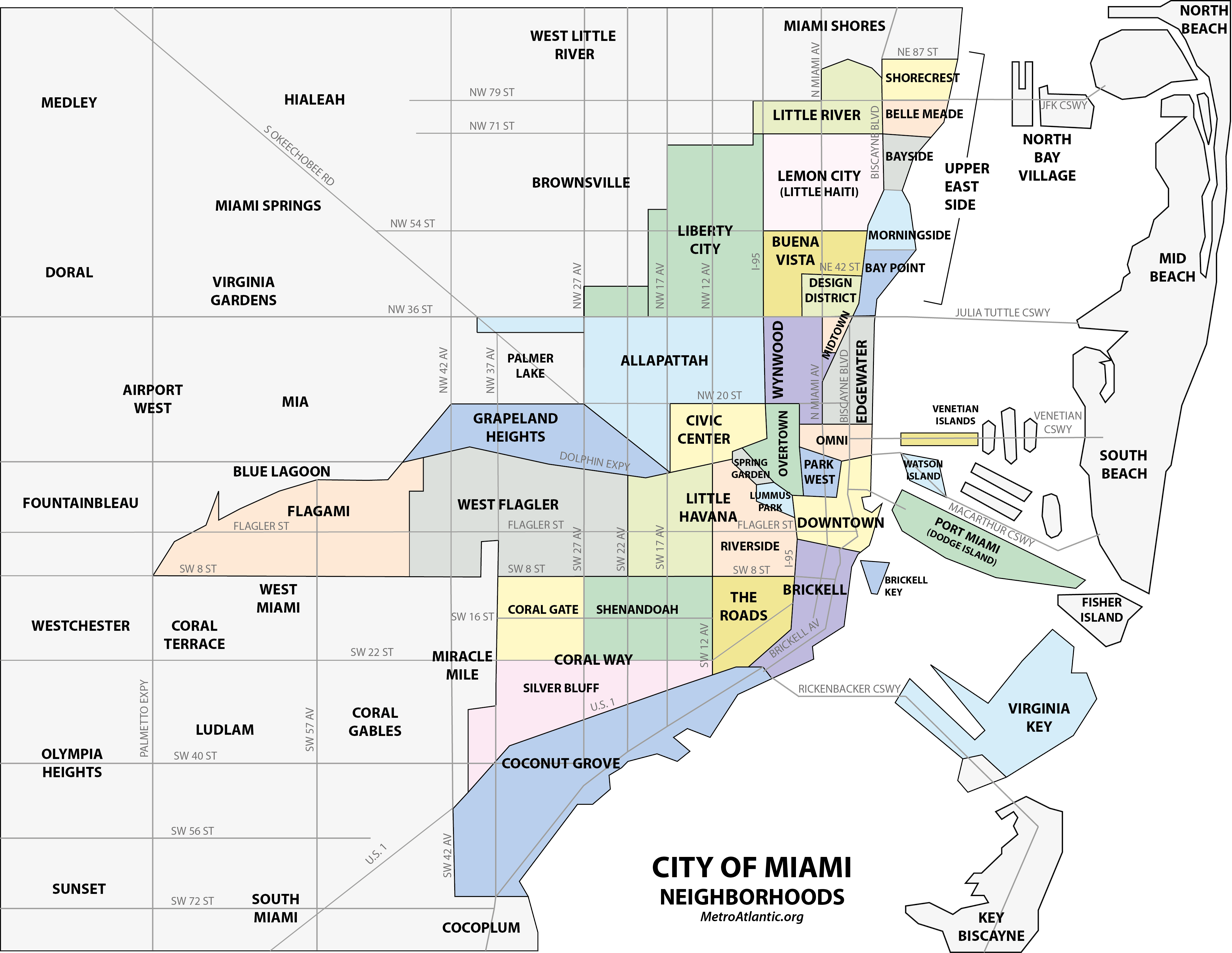
- Park West neighborhood within the City of Miami
- Coordinates: 25.784609°N 80.1929°W
- Country: United States
- State: Florida
- County: Miami-Dade County
- City: Miami

Government
  - City of Miami Commissioner: Damian Pardo
  - Miami-Dade Commissioners: Keon Hardemon - District 3
  - State House of Representatives: Cynthia A. Stafford (D)
  - State Senate: Gwen Margolis (D)
  - U.S. House: Maria Elvira Salazar (R)

Population (2010)
  - Total: 4,655(Park West population only); 71,000(Greater Downtown population)
  - Density: 9,414/sq mi (3,635/km^{2})
- Time zone: UTC-05 (EST)
- ZIP Code: 33132
- Area codes: 305, 786
- Website: Miami Downtown Development Authority

Park West is a neighborhood of Greater Downtown, Miami, Florida. It is roughly bound by Biscayne Boulevard to the east, West (NW) First Avenue to the west, North (NE/NW) 7th Street to the south and Interstate 395 to the north. As of 2010, about 4,655 residents live in Park West. The neighborhood is named 'Park West' due to its location just west of Museum Park.

== Future development ==
Much of the neighborhood west of the Metromover will be developed into Miami World Center, a major urban center containing a convention center, hotel, residential condo towers, and 765,000 square feet of retail. Plans for an enclosed Mall at Miami WorldCenter anchored by Bloomingdales and Macy's, have been replaced in favor of an open air promenade shopping district. Demolition of buildings making up the former "club row" began in 2015 clearing the way for construction to begin.

== Transportation ==
Park West is one of the best connected neighborhoods in Miami by mass transit. It is served by Miami-Dade Transit via Metrobus, Miami Metrorail and Metromover. The neighborhood is also served by Miami's Trolley System and by the Brightline.

Metrorail:

- Government Center (Northwest First Street and First Avenue)
- Historic Overtown/Lyric Theatre (Northwest Eighth Street and First Avenue)

Metromover:

- Downtown/Inner Loop
  - Stations: Wilkie D Ferguson, Jr.; College North
- Omni Loop
  - Stations: Wilkie D Ferguson, Jr.; College North; Freedom Tower; Park West; Eleventh Street; Museum Park

Metrobus:

- 3 : Downtown - Aventura (via Biscayne Blvd)
  - Northbound Bus Stops: Biscayne Blvd & NE 9th St (#6718); Biscayne Blvd & NE 11th St (#10530)
  - Southbound Bus Stops: Biscayne Blvd & NE 11th St (#6714); Biscayne Blvd & NE 9th St (#6715)
- 100 : Downtown - Aventura Mall (via Miami Beach)
  - Northbound Bus Stops: Biscayne Blvd & NE 9th St (#6718); Biscayne Blvd & NE 11th St (#10530)
  - Southbound Bus Stops: Biscayne Blvd & NE 9th St (#6715)
- 7 : Downtown - Dolphin Mall - Airport (via 7th St)
  - Westbound Bus Stops: NE 6th St & NE 1st Ave (#6670); NW 6th St & 1st Ave (#24)
- 9 : Downtown - Aventura (via NE 2 Ave)
  - Northbound Bus Stops: NE 1st Ave & NE 6th St (#6638); NE 1st Ave & NE 10th St (#6840)
  - Southbound Bus Stops: NE 2nd Ave & NE 10th St (#6785); Freedom Tower Metromover Station (#826)

Miami Trolley:

- Biscayne Route (Design District <-> Brickell Station)
- Coral Way (Port Miami <-> Coral Gables)

Brightline:

- Miami Central (Northwest Sixth Street and First Ave)
  - Provides service to Aventura, Ft Lauderdale, West Palm Beach & Orlando
