= Greater Downtown Miami =

Neighborhood in Florida, United States

- Neighborhood
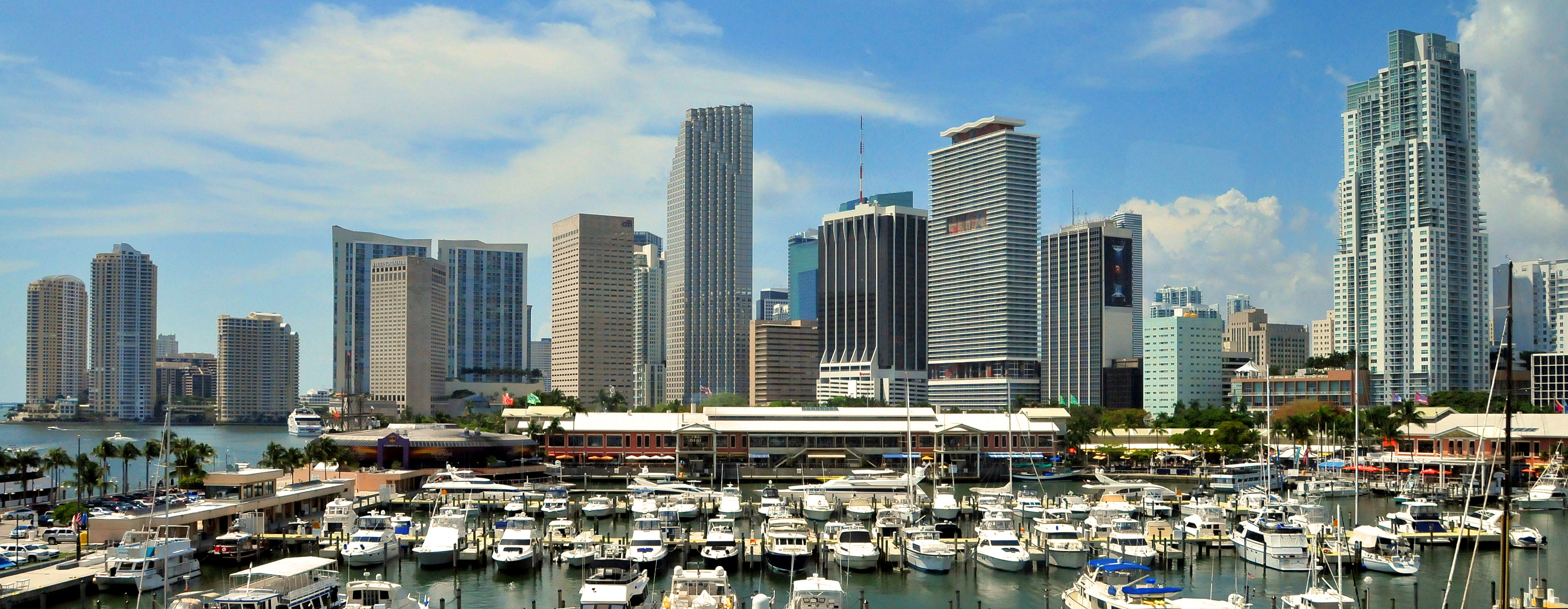
- View from Biscayne Bay
- Nicknames: Downtown, Central Business District
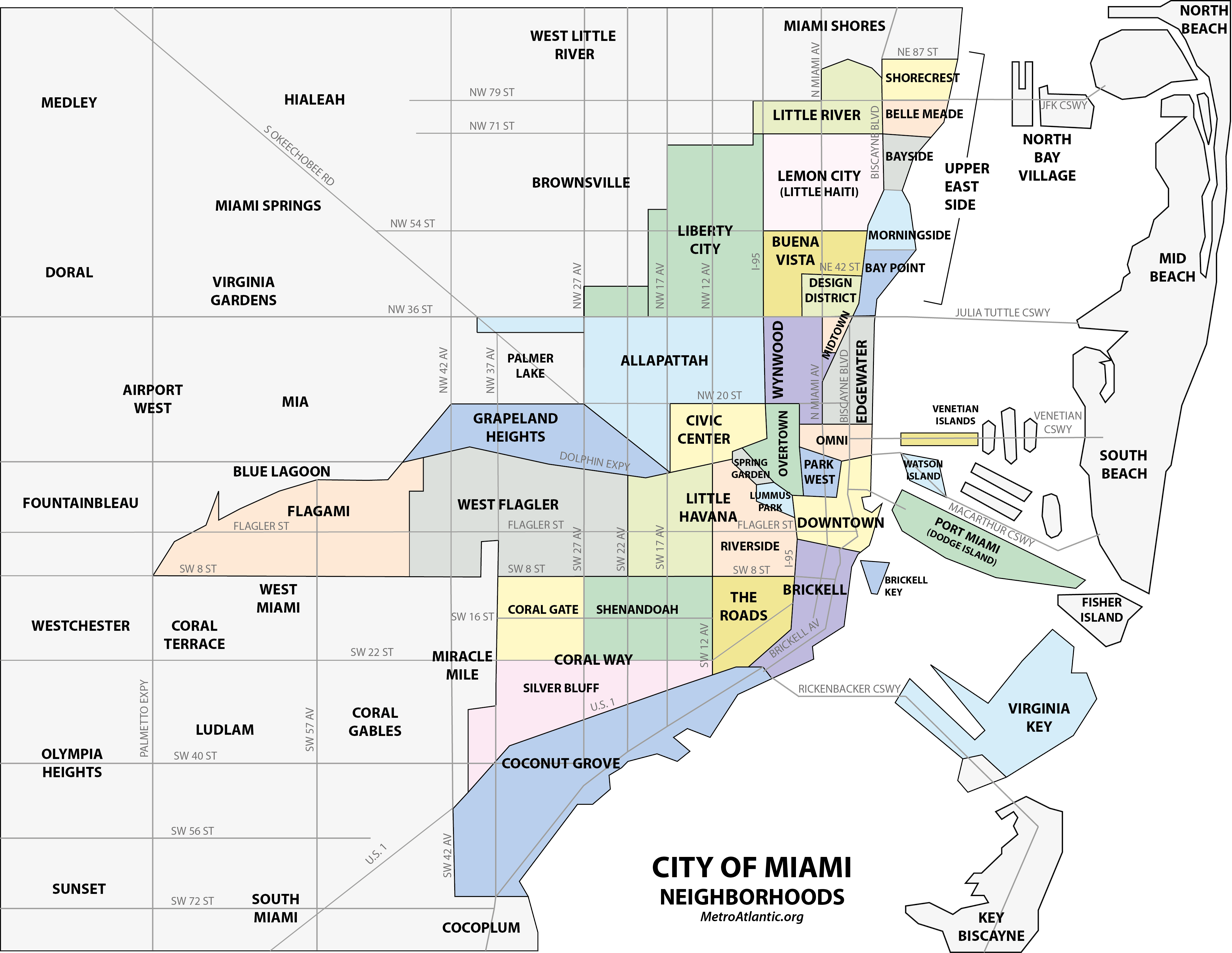
- Downtown neighborhoods within the City of Miami
- Coordinates: 25.774°N 80.190°W
- Country: United States
- State: Florida
- County: Miami-Dade County
- City: Miami
- Settled: 1830s
- Incorporated into the City of Miami: 1896
- Subdistricts of Downtown: Neighborhoods: Brickell; Central Business District (CBD); Downtown Miami Historic District; Edgewater; Jewelry District; Midtown; Arts & Entertainment District; Overtown; Park West; Wynwood

Government
  - City of Miami Commissioner: Ken Russell (D)
  - Miami-Dade Commissioners: Vacant
  - House of Representatives: Ashley Ganett (D) and Vicki Lopez (R)
  - State Senate: Shervin Jones (D), Ileana Garcia (R), and Alexis Calatayud (R)
  - U.S. House: Maria Elvira Salazar (R)

Area
  - All Downtown neighborhoods: 3.80 sq mi (9.84 km^{2})

Population (2010)
  - All Downtown neighborhoods: 66,769
  - Density: 17,570/sq mi (6,780/km^{2})
  - CBD population only: 13,856
  - Daytime population: 250,757
- Demonym: Downtowner
- Time zone: UTC-05 (EST)
- ZIP Code: 33128, 33129, 33130, 33131, 33132, 33136
- Area codes: 305, 786
- Website: miamidda.com

Greater Downtown Miami is the urban core of Miami, Florida, United States. The city's greater downtown region consists of the Central Business District, Brickell, the Historic District, Government Center, the Arts & Entertainment District, and Park West. It is divided by the Miami River and is bordered by Midtown Miami's Edgewater, and Wynwood sections to its north, Biscayne Bay to its east, the Health District and Overtown to its west, and Coconut Grove to its south.

It serves as the core of the Miami metropolitan area, the nation's sixth-largest and world's 65th-largest metropolitan area with a population of 6.158 million people.

Brickell Avenue and Biscayne Boulevard are the main north–south roads, and Flagler Street is the main east–west road. The areas perimeters are defined by the Miami Downtown Development Authority as the 3.8-square-mile (9.8 km^{2}) area east of Interstate 95 between Rickenbacker Causeway to the south and the Julia Tuttle Causeway, which connects Miami and Miami Beach, to the north.

The area is a cultural, financial, and commercial center of the Miami metropolitan area, tracing its present-day history back to the 19th century. It currently has the third greatest concentration of high-rises in the United States and is home to many major museums, parks, education centers, banks, company headquarters, courthouses, government offices, theaters, shops and many of the oldest buildings in the city.

== History ==
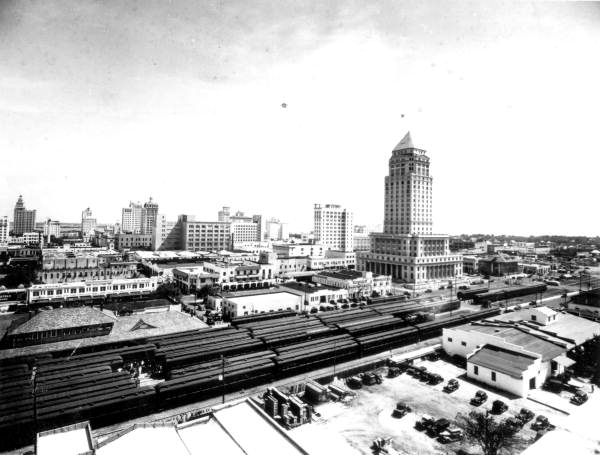
The skyline of Downtown Miami with the Florida East Coast Railway passenger train station and the Dade County Courthouse in the foreground, c. 1930s

Downtown Miami is the historic heart of Miami. Along with Coconut Grove, Downtown Miami is the oldest settled area of Miami, with early pioneer settlement dating to the early 19th century. Urban development began in the 1890s with the construction of the Florida East Coast Railway by Standard Oil industrialist Henry Flagler down to Miami at the insistence of Julia Tuttle. Flagler, along with developers such as William Brickell and George E. Merrick helped bring developer interest to the city with the construction of hotels, resorts, homes, and the extension of Flagler's rail line. Flagler Street, originating in Downtown, is a major east–west road in Miami named after the tycoon; the Julia Tuttle Causeway, crossing Biscayne Bay just north of Downtown in Edgewater, is named in honor of Tuttle.

As of 2009, there are approximately 71,000 year-round residents in Greater Downtown (including Downtown's Brickell, Park West, and Arts & Entertainment District neighborhoods), with close to 200,000 populating the Downtown area during the daytime, making Downtown Miami one of the most populous downtowns in the U.S. after New York City and Chicago. With recent mass construction of high-rise residential buildings and office towers, Downtown has experienced large growth, with new shops, bars, parks, and restaurants opening up, attracting many new residents.

Along with Brickell, Downtown has grown from 40,000 residents in 2000, to over 70,000 in 2009, making it one of the fastest-growing areas in Florida. It was estimated in February 2010, that about 550 new residents move to the Downtown area every month. As of 2009, over 190,000 office employees work in Downtown and Brickell.

Downtown is served by the Miami Metrorail at Historic Overtown/Lyric Theatre, Government Center, and Brickell stations, accessible from Broward and Palm Beach counties via Tri-Rail transfer station. The Metro connects to the Downtown Metromover, which encompasses 22 stations on the clockwise Inner (or Downtown) loop and counterclockwise Brickell and Omni branch loops. Government Center station is Downtown's main station and allows for transfers to all Metromover loops, Metrorail trains, and Metrobus lines at the Stephen P. Clark Government Center.

== Neighborhoods ==
Downtown Miami is centered on the Central Business District (CBD), best known by locals as simply "Downtown". Although distinct neighborhoods with different characters, all the following neighborhoods are often labeled under the umbrella term of "Downtown Miami":

=== Central business district ("downtown") ===
The Central Business District (CBD), often referred to locally as simply "Downtown", is the historic center of Miami. The CBD is bound by Northeast Sixth Street to the north, Biscayne Bay to the east, and the Miami River to the west and south. The majority of Miami's historic buildings are located in this district, including Flagler Street, museums, libraries, offices, schools, the vast majority of local, county, state and federal government offices and courthouses, and Miami's Historic District and Government Center.

The CBD is directly served by the Miami Metrorail at Government Center Station and by 13 Metromover stations on the Downtown, Brickell, and Omni Loops.

==== Miami Jewelry District ====
The Miami Jewelry District is a sub-neighborhood within the Central Business District historically known for its numerous jewelry stores, jewelers and gem dealers. It is where a variety of jeweled products are sold and is one of the three jewelry districts in the United States. It comprises four city blocks, bounded by North Miami Avenue, Northeast Second Avenue, East Flagler Street and Northeast Second Streets. Shoppers can find designer jewelry, precious stones, and gold and silver items at street level in various retail jewelry stores. The Jewelry District can be accessed by public transportation through the Metromover and Metrorail.

=== Brickell ===
Brickell is south of the Miami River, and is a mixed upper-class residential neighborhood as well as Miami's major financial district along Brickell Avenue. The Shops at Mary Brickell Village, Brickell City Center, and Simpson Park are located within Brickell. Brickell is directly served by the Miami Metrorail at Brickell Station, and by five Metromover stations on the Brickell Loop.

=== Arts and Entertainment District ===
The Arts & Entertainment District is an urban neighborhood with numerous hotels, and high-rise residential buildings. The neighborhood's former name Omni comes from the Omni International Mall on Biscayne Boulevard. The district borders Biscayne Bay the east, NE 2nd Ave to the west, NE 21st St to the north and I-395 to the south. Pace Park, Adrienne Arsht Center for the Performing Arts, and the (former) Miami Herald headquarters are located within the district. The Arts & Entertainment District is served by the Miami Metrorail at: Government Center Station, and by two Metromover stations on the Omni Loop.

=== Park West ===
Park West is the neighborhood just west of Museum Park, east of NW 1st Ave, south of I-195, and north of NE 6th St. Park West was primarily known for its nightclubs, and in recent years has been the talk of much revitalization and project proposals for the revitalization of the area. By the end of 2015 most of the nightclubs along the former club row west of the MetroMover from the Freedom Tower station to the Eleventh Street Station have been demolished to make way for planned construction of Miami World Center. Park West is directly served by the Miami Metrorail at: Historic Overtown/Lyric Theatre Station, and by three Metromover stations on the Omni Loop.

== Demographics ==
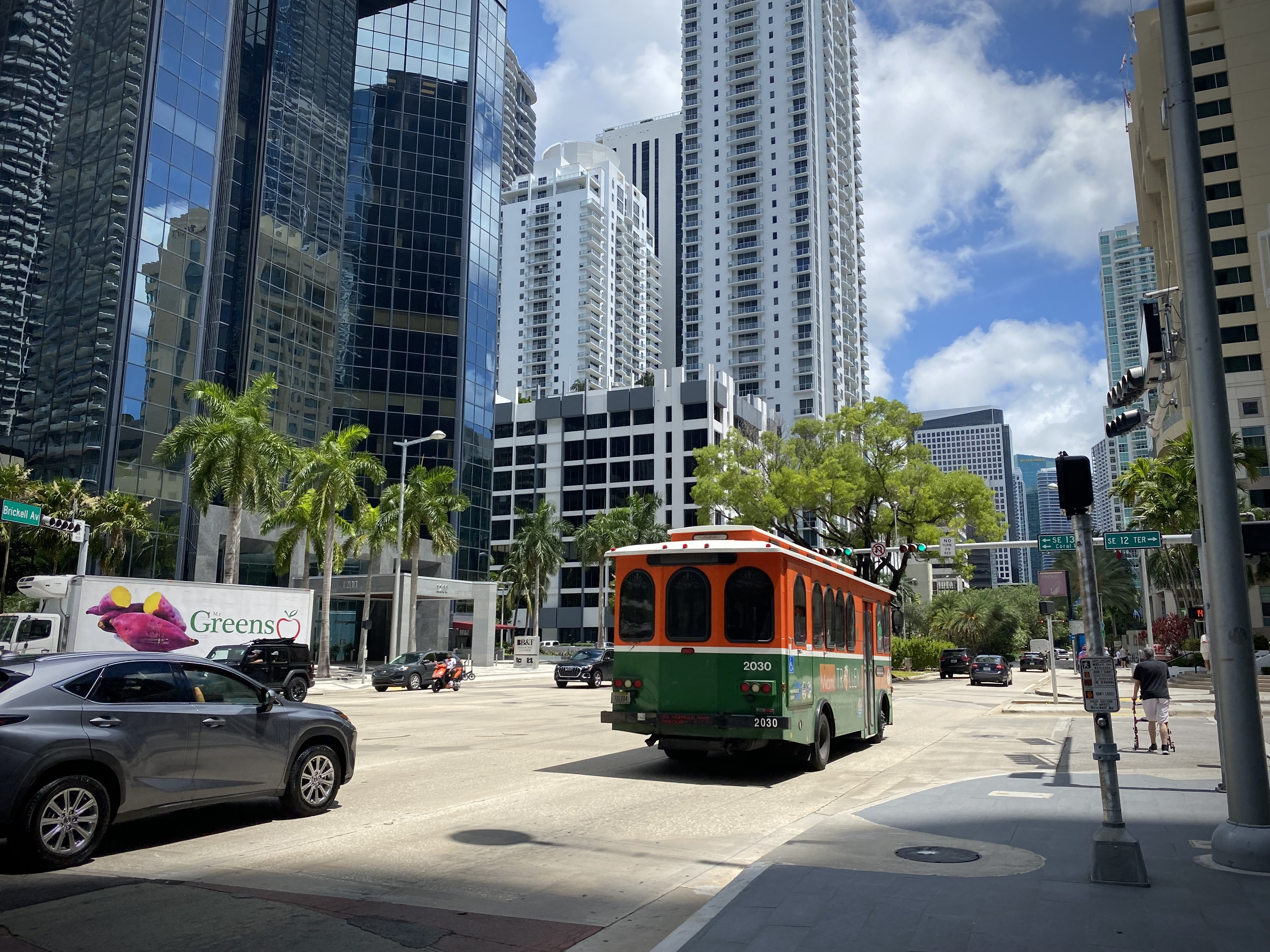
Brickell, the fastest-growing neighborhood in Miami, has one of the highest population densities in the United States outside of New York City.

Historical population
Census	Pop.	Note	%±
1990	36,140		—
2000	40,556		12.2%
2010	66,769		64.6%
2020	110,006		64.8%
2022 (est.)	113,649		3.3%

As of 2010, the population of Downtown Miami was 65,696 people, with a population density of 27,487 per square mile. In the 2010 US Census, the racial makeup of Downtown was 57.6% Hispanic of any race, 30.8% White (non-Hispanic), 7.2% Black, and 2.9% Asian. The zip codes for Brickell include 33129, 33130, and 33131. The area covers 1.084 square miles (2.81 km^{2}).

In 2000, Downtown had a population of 39,176 residents, with 15,333 households in 1990 with an average of 2.2 residents per household, 17,130 households in 2000 with a household average of 2.1, and 33,600 households in 2009 with a household average of 2.0 residents. By 2014, the population of Downtown is expected to grow to 85,000 with 42,400 households. The median household income was $29,396 in 2000 and $40,180 in 2009.

The zip codes for Downtown include 33128, 33130, 33131, and 33132. The area covers 2.117 square miles (5.48 km^{2}). As of 2000, there were 6,451 males and 4,792 females. The median age for males were 34.5 years old, while the median age for females were 35.8 years old. The average household size had 1.9 people, while the average family size had 2.8 members. The percentage of married-couple families among all households was 25.5%, while the percentage of married-couple families with children (among all households) was 8.5%, and the percentage of single-mother households among all households was 5.8%. 15.3% of the population was in correctional institutions. 1.6% of the population was in other group homes. The percentage of never-married males 15 years old and over was 27.6%, while the percentage of never-married females 15 years old and over was 13.9%.

As of 2000, the percentage of people that speak English not well or not at all made up 23.1% of the population. The percentage of residents born in Florida was 26.9%, the percentage of people born in another U.S. state was 25.0%, and the percentage of native residents but born outside the U.S. was 6.4%, while the percentage of foreign born residents was 41.7%.

2009 Census projections indicate that the area's residential base has increased from 40,000 to 71,000 since 2000, with an expected Downtown population of 85,000 by 2014. As of 2006, 189,164 residents live in the immediate Downtown/Brickell area.

== Transportation ==
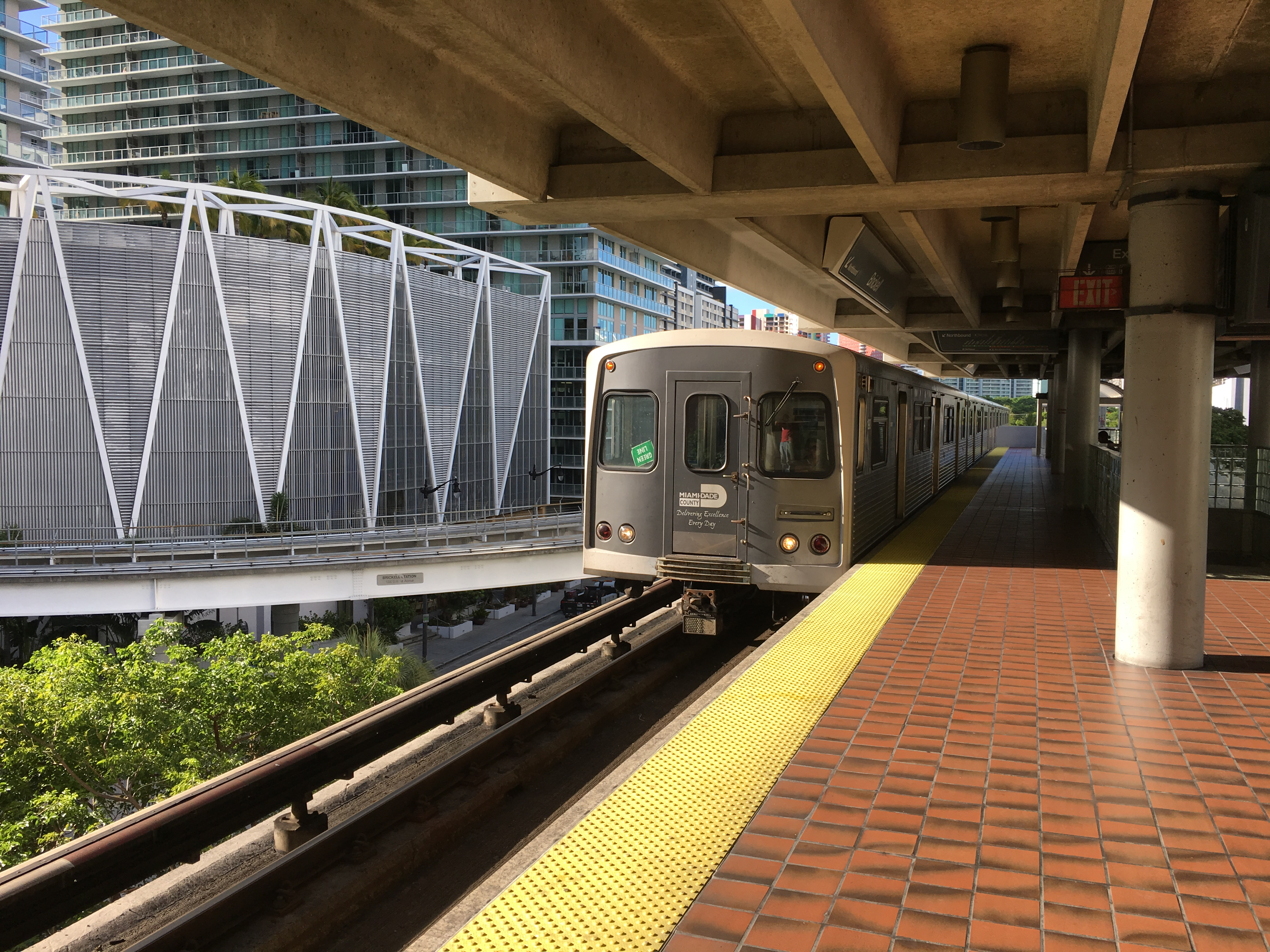
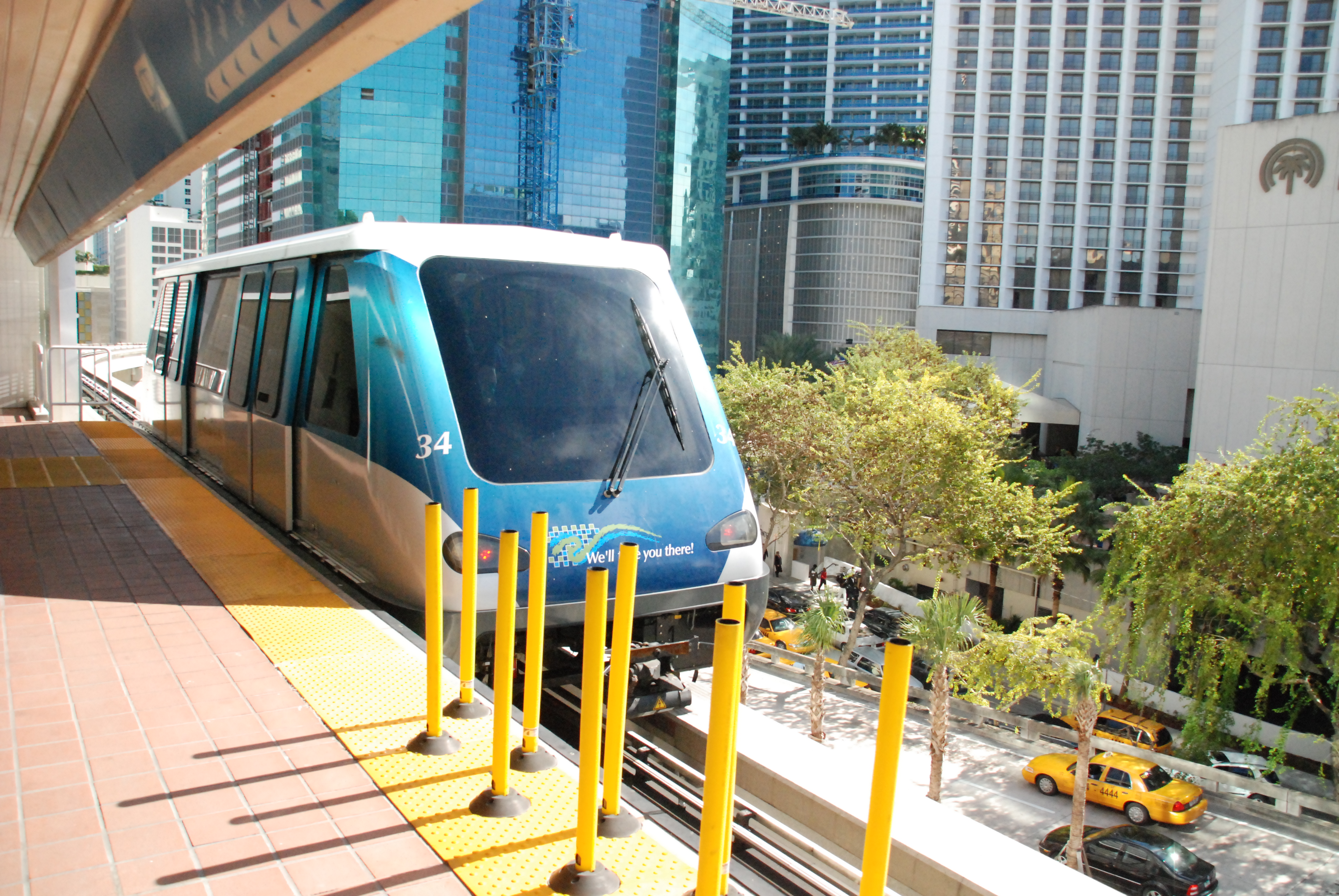
Metrorail (top) and Metromover are elevated modes of public transportation in Downtown Miami.

Public transportation in the Downtown area is used more than in any other part of Miami and is a vital part of Downtown life. Metrorail, Miami's heavy rail system, makes three stops in Downtown on both the green and orange lines at the Historic Overtown/Lyric Theatre Station, Government Center Station, and the Brickell Station. In addition to Metrorail, the automated Metromover train system runs three lines (the Downtown Loop, the Omni Loop, and the Brickell Loop) with 22 stations throughout Downtown. The Metromover is a free service and stations can be found at roughly every two blocks in Downtown and Brickell.

Downtown Miami is served by Metrobus throughout the area, the Miami Metrorail, and the Metromover:

Metrorail:

- Government Center (NW 1st Street and 1st Avenue)
- Brickell (SW 11th Street and 1st Avenue)
- Historic Overtown/Lyric Theatre (NW 8th Street and 1st Avenue)

Metromover:

- Downtown/Inner Loop
- Omni Loop
- Brickell Loop

Metrorail has stops throughout Miami with connections to Miami International Airport, all Metrobus lines, Tri-Rail and Amtrak. The main bus station in Downtown is located next to the Arsht Center at the Adrienne Arsht Center Station.

As an urban and pedestrian-friendly area with an extensive public transit network, Downtown (along with Brickell, the Arts & Entertainment District, and South Beach) is one of the areas in Miami where a car-free lifestyle is commonplace. Many Downtown residents get around by foot, bicycle, Metromover or by taxi. The Metromover is a popular alternative to walking in the area, especially on rainy, hot or cold days, as the Metromover is free, and stations are located roughly every two blocks throughout the area.

Recently, the City of Miami, along with the Downtown Development Authority, has begun bicycle initiatives promoting citywide bike parking and bike lanes, that have made bicycling much more popular for residents. Bike lanes and bike sharrows are currently planned for the majority of Downtown streets to be painted by the end of 2010. Venetian Causeway is a popular bicycle commuter route that connects South Beach to Downtown. The Rickenbacker Causeway is very popular on weekends for recreational bicyclists, and often, bicycles can outnumber cars on the causeway.

=== Tri-Rail expansion ===
In the 2025 and 2030 long range transportation plans, Miami's commuter rail system, Tri-Rail, has envisioned moving to or adding service on the Florida East Coast Railway (FEC) corridor, which runs along the region's densest neighborhoods, parallel to Biscayne Boulevard in Miami, and Federal Highway in Broward and Palm Beach counties.

Tri-Rail service on the FEC line would bring Tri-Rail to Downtown's transit hub, Government Center Station, connecting Downtown directly to Midtown Miami/Miami Design District, Upper East Side/Miami Shores, North Miami, North Miami Beach/Aventura, Downtown Hollywood, and Downtown Fort Lauderdale. Currently, rail commuters must transfer onto the Metrorail in Hialeah to get to Downtown. Miami's Downtown Development Authority along with Miami-area politicians are actively lobbying to bring Tri-Rail to the city core.

=== Taxis ===
Taxis are popular in Downtown, especially from Downtown to South Beach, Design District or to Coconut Grove. Since many Downtown residents choose to not have cars, taxis are also popular for rides within Downtown neighborhoods, especially after midnight when the Metromover stops running. Taxis can be hailed on the street, or phoned.

== Economy ==
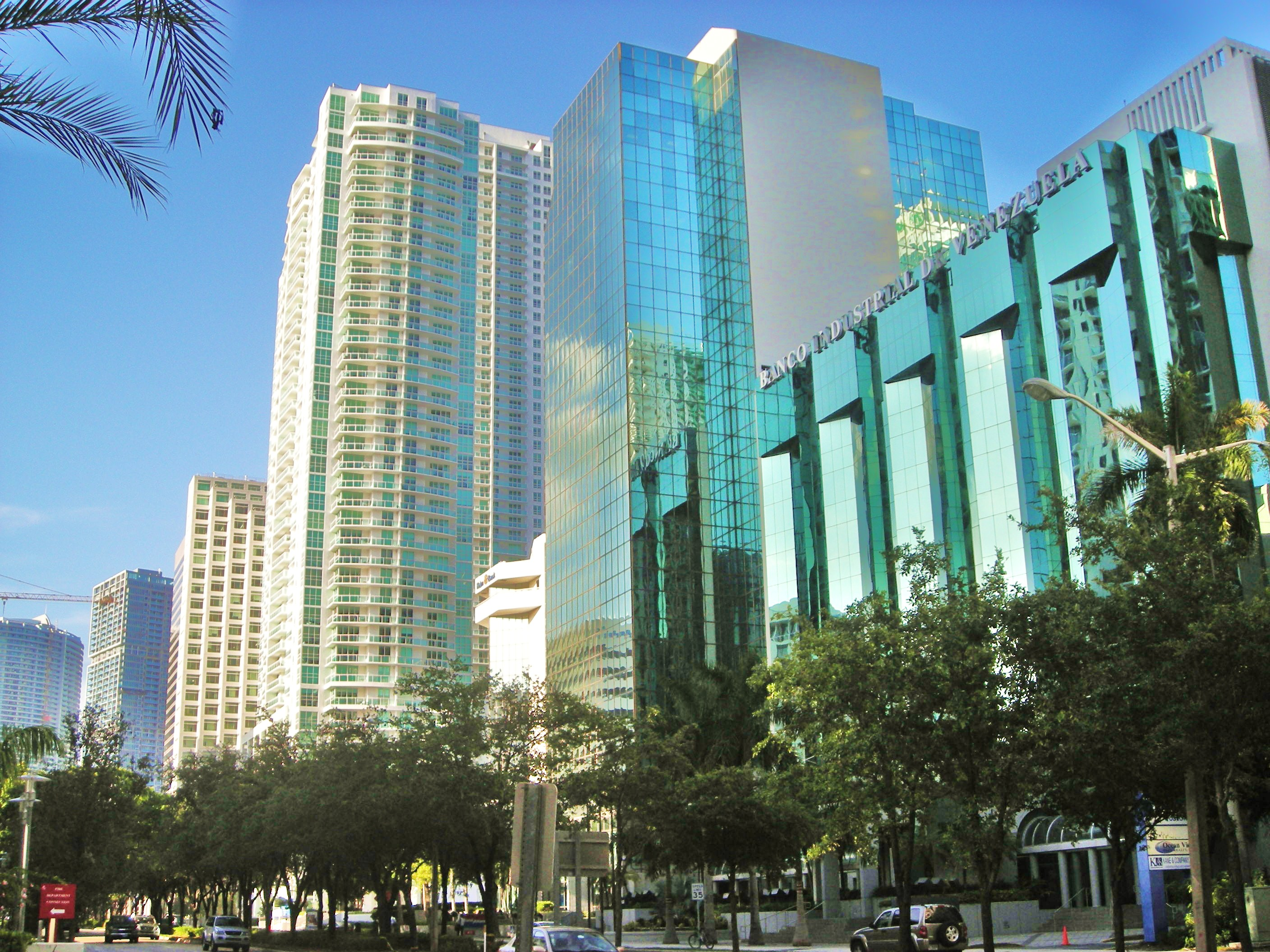
Brickell Avenue has the largest concentration of international banks in the United States.

Downtown is home to many companies, corporations and organizations. Downtown has about 20 million square feet (1,900,000 m^{2}) of office space, and is the central financial and business hub of South Florida. Some private companies with headquarters in Downtown are Akerman LLP, Arquitectonica, Espírito Santo Financial Group, Florida Justice Institute, Greenberg Traurig, Holland & Knight, Macy's Florida, Miami Herald, Miami Today, Shutts & Bowen, Terremark Worldwide, Vector Group, World Property Channel, and Zyscovich Architects. Sanford Group Company and Sanford Fiduciary Investor Services, Inc., and LTU International had headquarters in Downtown.

Public organizations with their main offices in Downtown include, the central offices of the Beacon Council, the Downtown Development Authority, Miami-Dade County government, Miami-Dade County Public Schools, Miami Police Department, Miami-Dade Parks and Recreation], and other City of Miami departments despite city hall's location in Coconut Grove.

=== Consulates ===
Several countries have consulates based in Downtown, most of which are located along Biscayne Boulevard and Brickell Avenue. These include:

- Argentina
- (The Bahamas) Bahamas
- Bolivia
- Brazil
- Chile
- Colombia
- Dominican Republic
- Ecuador
- France
- Germany
- Guatemala
- Haiti
- Israel (Consulate-General of Israel to Florida & Puerto Rico)
- Jamaica
- Japan
- Mexico
- Netherlands
- Paraguay
- Peru
- Spain
- Suriname
- Turkey
- Trinidad and Tobago
- United Kingdom
- Uruguay

Japan first opened its consulate in Miami in 1992. As of 1992, this consulate gives logistical support to Japanese embassies in the Caribbean and Latin America. Japan opened a consulate in Miami after Japanese investors purchased several major real estate properties in Florida.

=== Chambers of commerce ===
Downtown is also home to many international chambers of commerce, these include:

- British American Business Council
- Italy-America Chamber of Commerce
- Spain-United States Chamber of Commerce
- German American Business Chamber
- Chilean-American Chamber of Commerce
- French American Chamber of Commerce.

== Historic districts ==
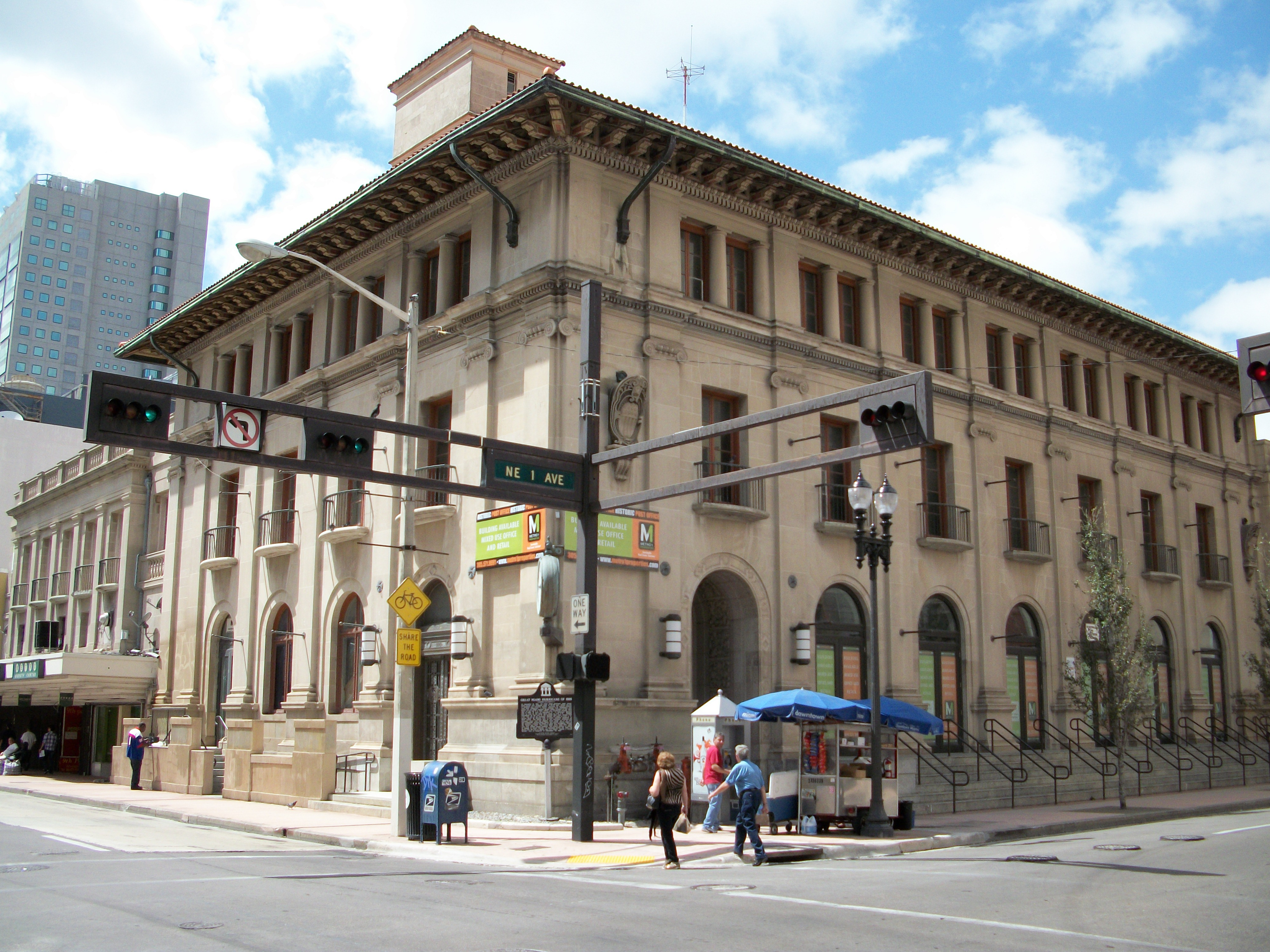
The Downtown Miami Historic District has over 60 buildings built between and 1896 and 1939 in the heart of the Central Business District

Downtown has three U.S. historic districts. The Downtown Miami Commercial Historic District, the Downtown Miami Historic District, and the Lummus Park Historic District.

The Downtown Miami Historic District comprises 380 acres (1.5 km^{2}) in the heart of Downtown with over 60 buildings within its jurisdiction. Many of the buildings within the area are of the Moderne style and Classical Revival style with uses for government, residential, and commercial. Periods of significance within this area are from 1900 to 1924, 1925 to 1949, and 1950 to 1974. The Downtown Miami Commercial Historic District was designated a historic district in 1988 and comprises 20 buildings on the east side of Downtown with 19th and early 20th-century revival styles.

The Lummus Park Historic District is west of Downtown in the neighborhood of Lummus Park. It is west of I-95 surrounding Lummus Park along the Miami River. The historic district was designated historic in 1988 and then expanded in 2006. The area is 260 acres (1.1 km^{2}) large with 43 different buildings mostly owned by private entities and the local government. Prominent styles include late 19th and early 20th-century revival styles, Art Deco, and Bungalow style, with prominent periods of 1900–1924 and 1925–1949.

== Parks ==
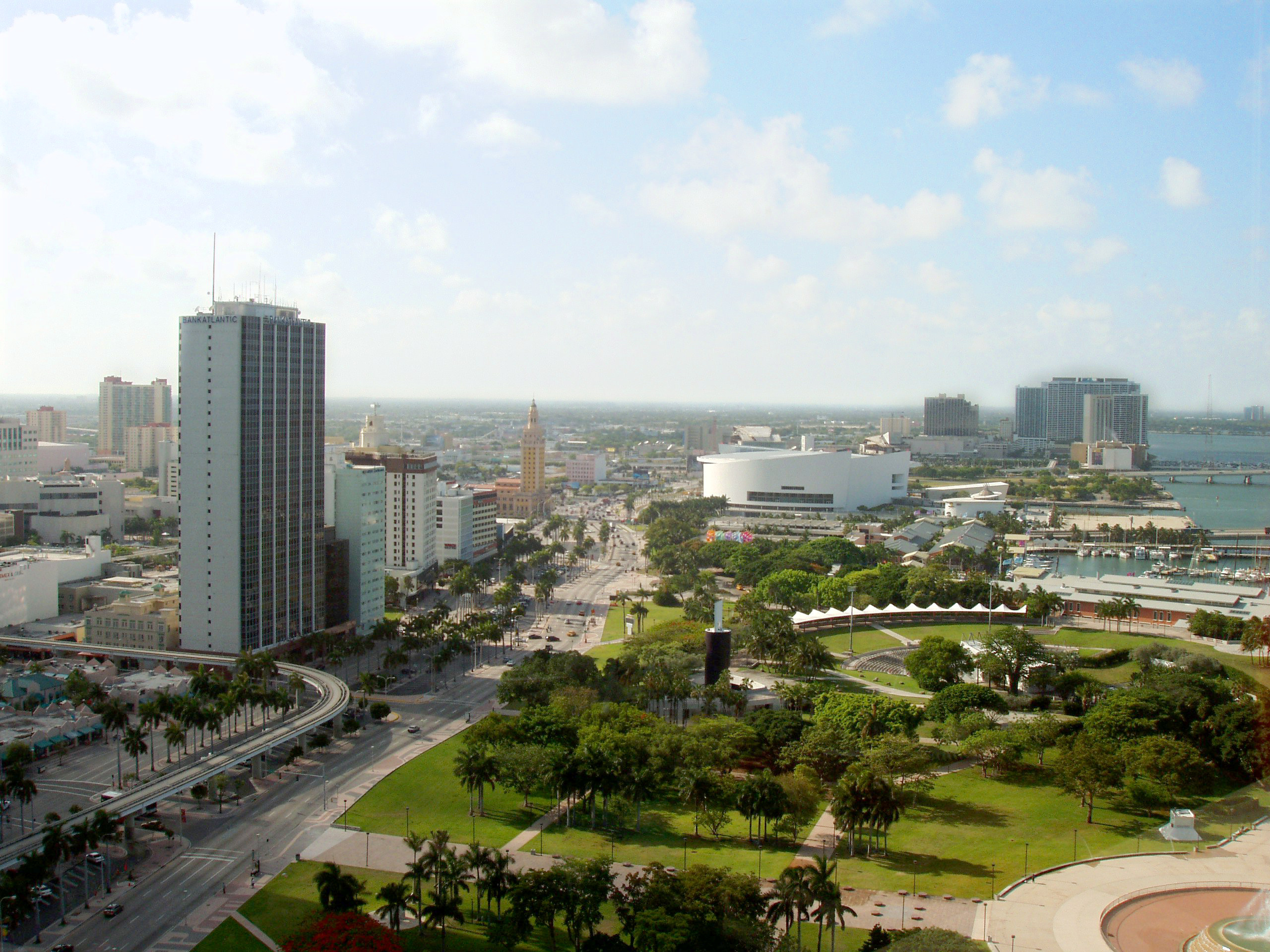
Bayfront Park, Downtown's Miami's largest and most visited park

Downtown's largest and most popular parks are Bayfront Park, Museum Park, and Pace Park. Bayfront Park is host to the free DWTWN Concert Series, put on weekly in the park's amphitheater, as well as various other annual events such as the Orange Drop for New Year's, Bike Miami, and the "America's Birthday Bash at Bayfront Park" for Independence Day. Bayfront Park hosts many large outdoor concerts such as Warped Tour and Ultra Music Festival. Formerly Bicentennial Park, Museum Park has been redone, and is now the site for new buildings for the Miami Art Museum and the Miami Science Museum.

Other parks in the Downtown area include:

- Fort Dallas Park, Central Business District
- Lummus Park, Central Business District
- Paul S. Walker Park, Central Business District
- Joan Lehman Sculpture Plaza, Central Business District
- Robert F. Clark Plaza, Central Business District
- Southside Park, Brickell
- Simpson Park, Brickell
- Alice Wainwright Park, Brickell
- Brickell Park, Brickell
- Miami Circle, Brickell
- Brickell Key Park, Brickell
- Brickell Plaza Mini Park, Brickell

== Government and infrastructure ==
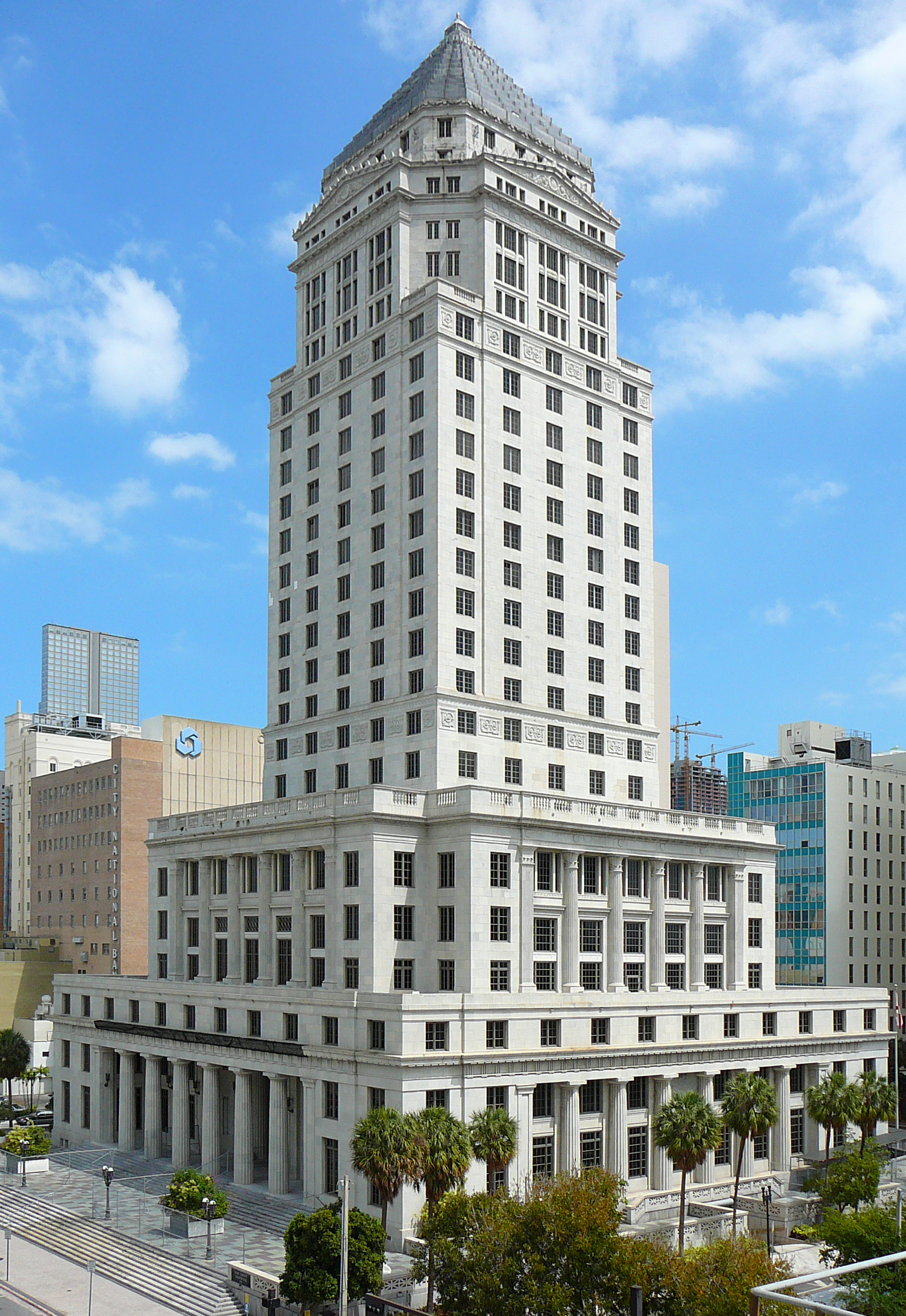
Dade County Courthouse, built in 1925, is one of many local, state and federal courthouses in Downtown Miami, including the Stephen P. Clark Government Center

As the county seat of Miami-Dade County, Downtown is home to the central offices and departments of the Miami-Dade County government, mainly located in the Government Center area. The Stephen P. Clark Government Center is the central headquarters of Miami-Dade government with the offices of the Miami-Dade Mayor. Although city hall for the City of Miami is in Coconut Grove, many offices of Miami's city government are in Downtown, including the city's Planning Department. The Miami Police Department also has its central offices in Downtown.

Downtown is home to many city, county, state, and federal courthouses, jails, judge offices, and law firms. Some of the courthouses in Downtown are the Dade County Family Court, U.S. Court of Appeals Judge, U.S. District Court Clerk, Miami-Dade County Courthouse, Federal Courthouse, U.S. Magistrate Judge, City of Miami courthouses and many others.

The United States Postal Service operates two post offices in Downtown. They are the Brickell Post Office and the Flagler Miami Post Office. The Federal Detention Center, Miami, operated by the Federal Bureau of Prisons, is located in Downtown.

=== Fire stations ===
The City of Miami Fire and Rescue Department operates 4 of its 14 fire stations within the Downtown area. Each are listed below.

- Fire Station # 1 – 144 NE 5th Street – Midtown/Overtown (Downtown)
- Fire Station # 2 – 1901 N Miami Avenue – Wynwood/Edgewater
- Fire Station # 3 – 1103 NW 7th Street – Little Havana/Overtown
- Fire Station # 4 – 1105 SW 2nd Avenue – Brickell/The Roads (Downtown)

== Cost of living ==
The average apartment sale price was $347,729 in 2010, up 15% from 2009, with the average apartment price at $300 per square foot. During the Miami building boom of the first decade of the 21st century, 23,628 condominium and apartments were built in numerous high-rise towers that quickly transformed the city. Over 85% of these apartments are now occupied as of early 2011. It is estimated that about 550 new residents move to Downtown every month. Renters make up 56% of the residents in Downtown.

In July 2011, Downtown's office vacancy rate was reported at 21% dropping from a high of 26% in mid-2010. Downtown also reported an average commercial asking rate of $36.33, making it the eighth-highest in the nation after Manhattan, Washington DC, Fairfield County, Connecticut, San Francisco, and Boston.

Downtown has over 6,000 hotel rooms in numerous hotels. Downtown has Miami's largest concentration of hotel rooms, and is the city's hub for business travellers. Many of these hotels are geared for business travellers, mostly along Brickell Avenue, some for luxury leisure stays, and others as bargain tourist hotels.

== Retail ==
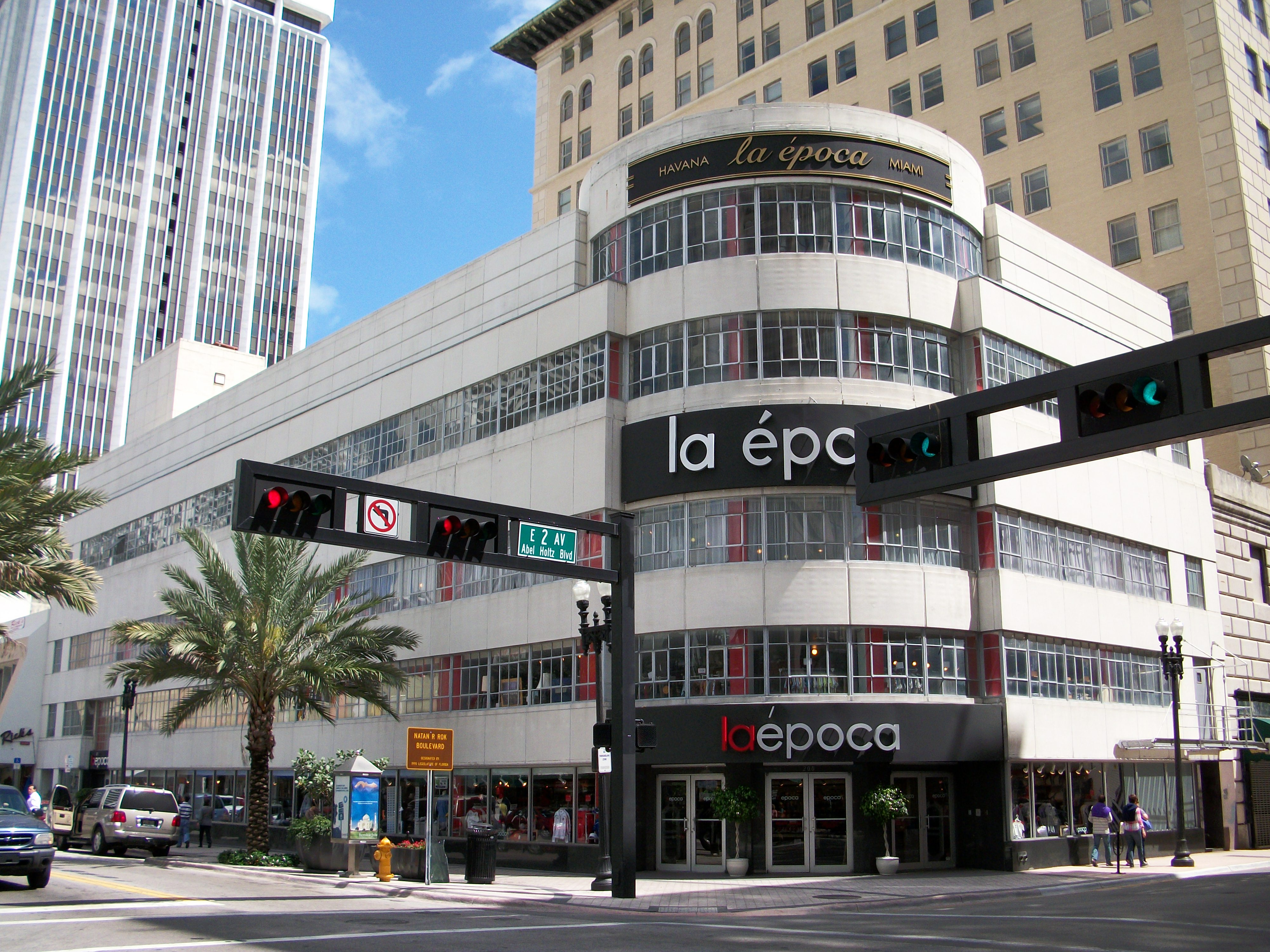
La Época, a local Miami store, is one of the department stores on Flagler Street, Downtown's main shopping street since the 1800s

Historically, Flagler Street has been Downtown's major shopping street dating back to the 19th century. Today, it is still Downtown's major shopping street, with Florida's flagship Macy's (formerly Burdines) on Flagler Street and Miami Avenue from 1912 to 2018, as well as Miami's own local department stores: La Época, on Flagler and SE 2nd Av; Alberto Cortes, on Flagler and SE 3rd Av. Flagler Street is also home to many well-known and established jewelers, many of whom have been in Downtown since the early 20th century (i.e.: Morays Jewelers, founded in 1900). This area is called the Miami Jewelry District and comprises four Downtown blocks from Miami Avenue to SE 2nd Av on Flagler Street and NE 1st St.

After many years of decay, recently, much focus has been placed on revitalizing Flagler Street to its former grandeur. In recent years, a renewed investment interest has been placed on Flagler Street, and many new restaurants and stores have opened up, new landscaping and pavers have been placed, as well as enforced security and tourist guides. Three new pocket parks opened on Flagler St in 2009, Paul S. Walker Park, Robert F. Clark Plaza, and the Joan Lehman Sculpture Plaza. These new parks have brought more green space, benches, art, and rest areas to the street.

Besides Flagler Street, Downtown has two other major shopping areas, Bayside Marketplace and Mary Brickell Village in Brickell. Bayside Marketplace was built in 1987, and is one of Miami's most visited tourist attractions averaging over 15 million visitors a year. It is an outdoor shopping mall overlooking Biscayne Bay at Bayfront Park. Bayside Marketplace has many national retail chains, as well as local Miami stores. Mary Brickell Village is on Miami Avenue and SE 10th Street in Brickell. Mary Brickell Village is a major nightlife area and has many of Miami's upscale bars and restaurants that stretch along Miami Avenue from around SE 6th Street to Broadway (SE 15th Road).

== Education ==
=== Public schools ===
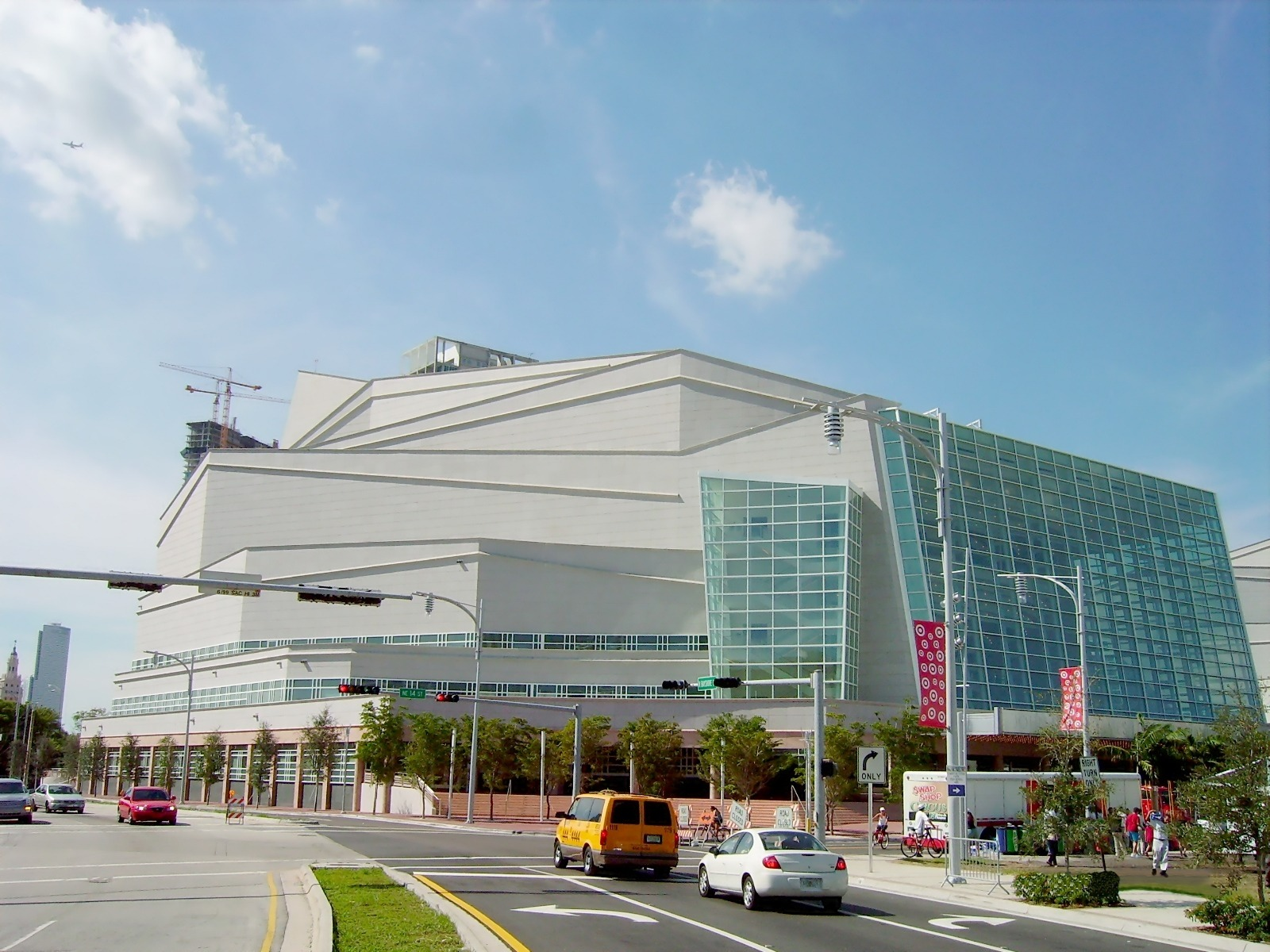
Adrienne Arsht Center for the Performing Arts, the second-largest performing arts center in the U.S.

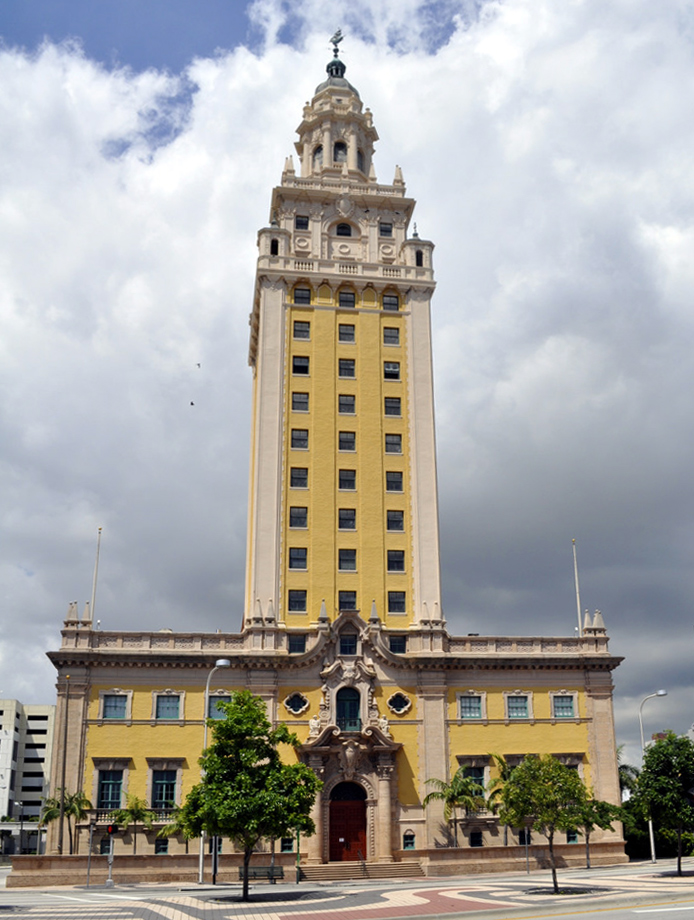
Freedom Tower, built in 1925, a local historic landmark and a symbol of the city

Miami-Dade County Public Schools operates Downtown Miami's public schools, which include:

==== Elementary schools ====
- Downtown Miami Charter School
- Southside Elementary School
- Miami Children's Museum School
- Bridgepoint Academy of Greater Miami (Charter)

==== High schools ====
- Law Enforcement Officers' Memorial High School, a magnet school
- New World School of the Arts, an arts magnet school

==== Public school zoning ====
Downtown children are zoned based on the neighborhood they live in within Downtown, roughly split into Brickell, Central Business District (CBD), and Arts & Entertainment District/Edgewater.

- Elementary schools:
  - Southside Elementary School, for Brickell children
  - Riverside Elementary School, for CBD children
  - Frederick Douglass Elementary School, for CBD children
  - Phillis Wheatley Elementary School, for Arts & Entertainment District and Edgewater children
- Middle schools:
  - Shenandoah Middle School, for Brickell children
  - José de Diego Middle School, for CBD, Arts & Entertainment District and Edgewater children
- High schools (open to all Downtown residents):
  - Young Women's Preparatory School, all-girls
  - Young Men's Preparatory School, all-boys
  - Booker T. Washington High School

=== Private schools ===
Plans are currently underway for a 1,700-student preparatory school in Brickell at 1742 SW 2nd Avenue, named "Brickell Preparatory Academy". Other private schools in Downtown are:

- First Presbyterian International Christian School
- Gordon Day School (Jewish)
- Prima Casa Montessori School

=== Colleges and universities ===
- Florida International University (Downtown Center), a public university at 1101 Brickell Avenue
- Miami Dade College (Wolfson Campus), a public college
- Miami International University of Art & Design, a private university
- Miami Culinary Institute, a public college
- University of Miami, highly ranked private research university in neighboring Coral Gables

== Cultural institutions ==
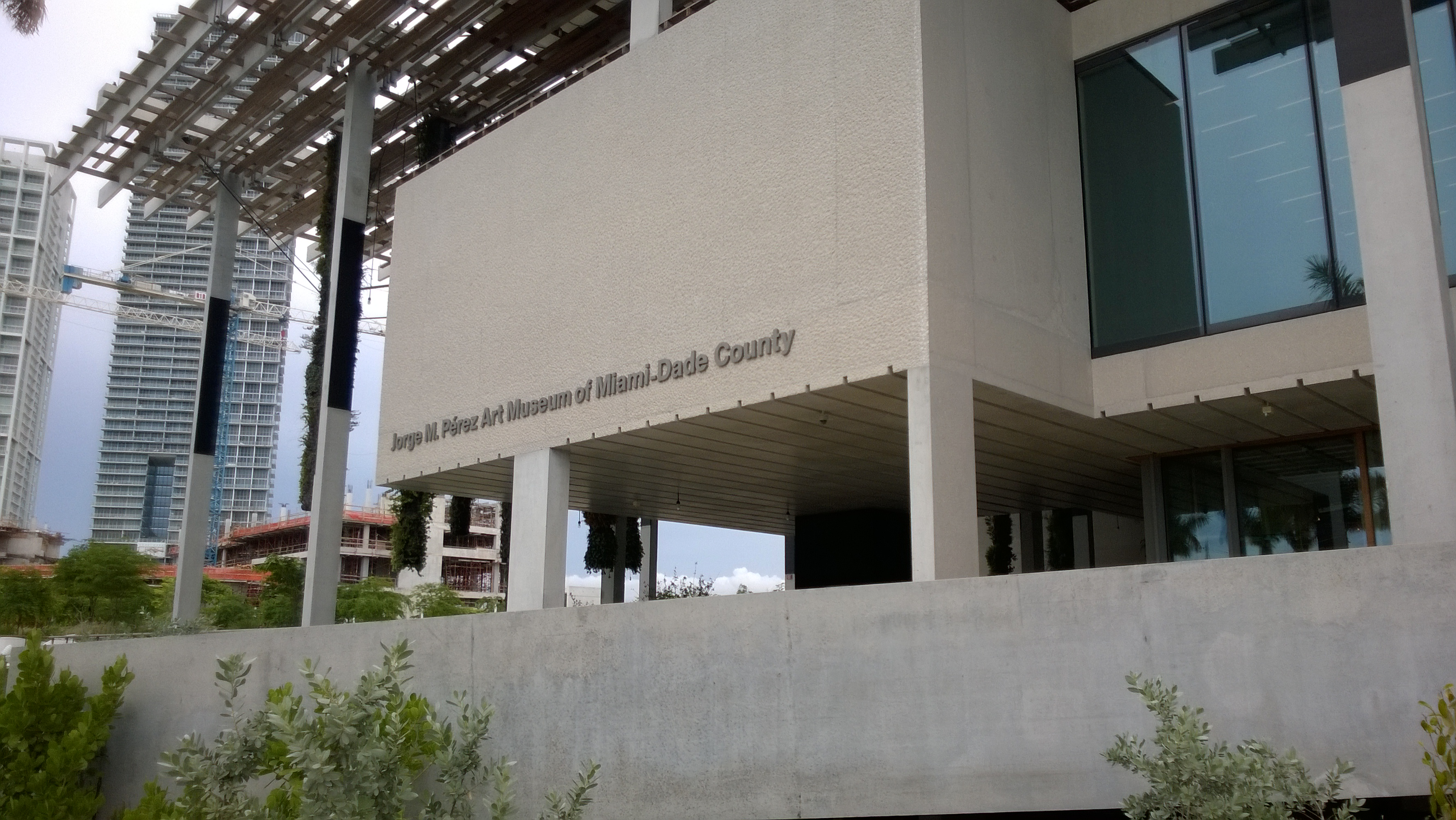
Pérez Art Museum Miami at Museum Park in Downtown's Park West neighborhood

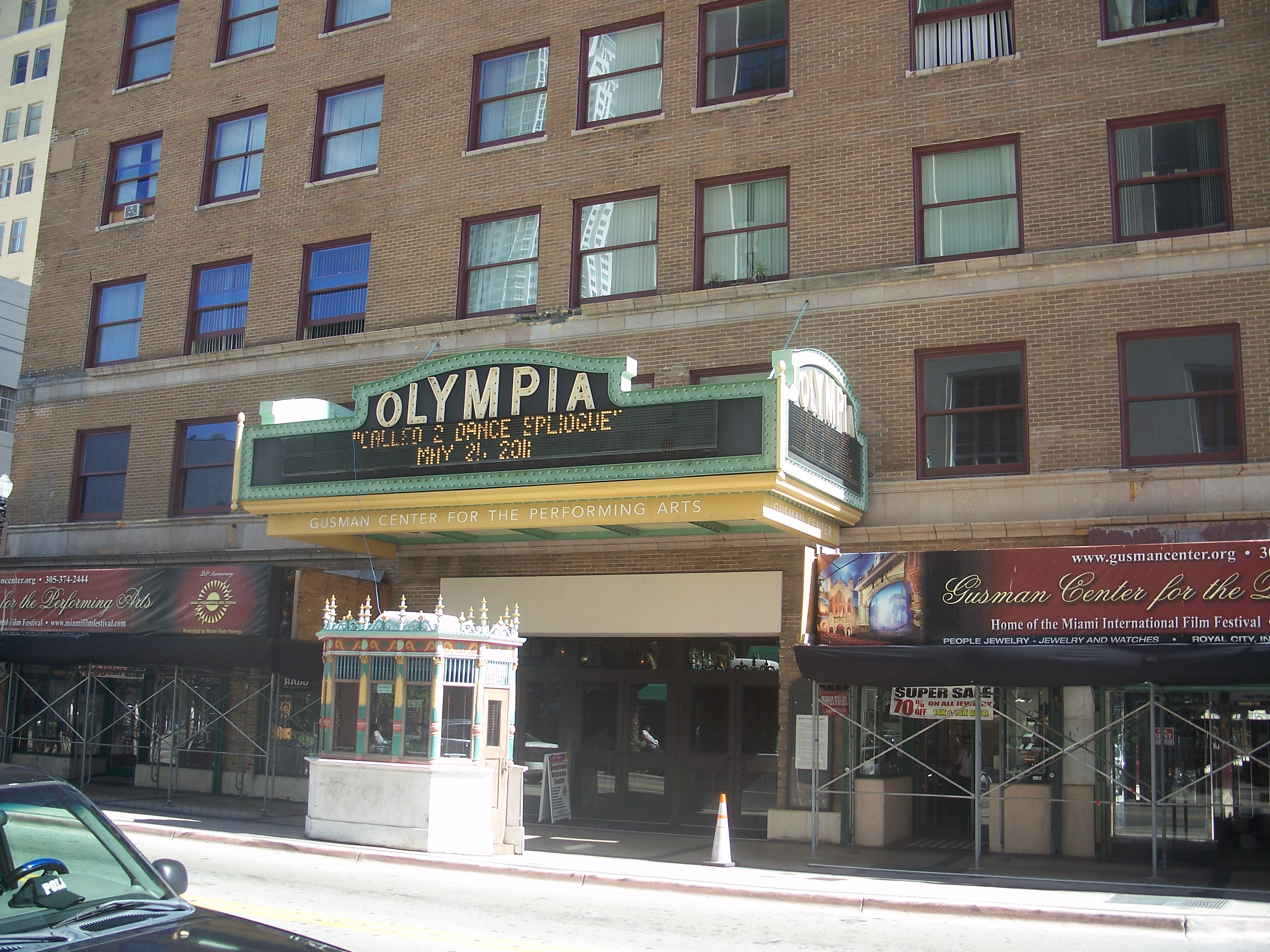
Olympia Theater is one of the last remaining theaters from the many that once existed on Flagler Street in the 1920s

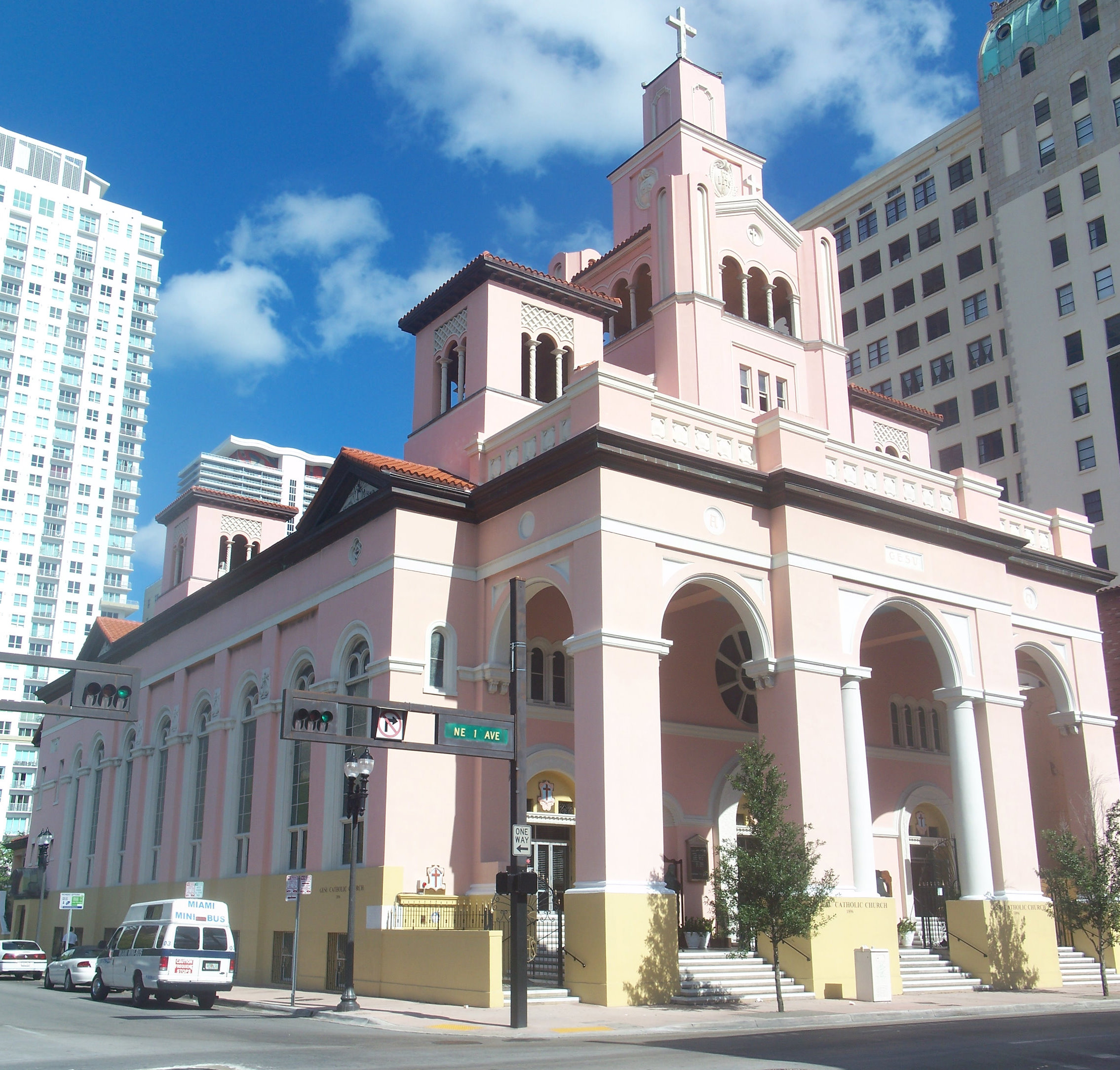
Gesu Church, built in 1896, is the oldest Catholic church in Miami and one of many central churches and synagogues in Downtown

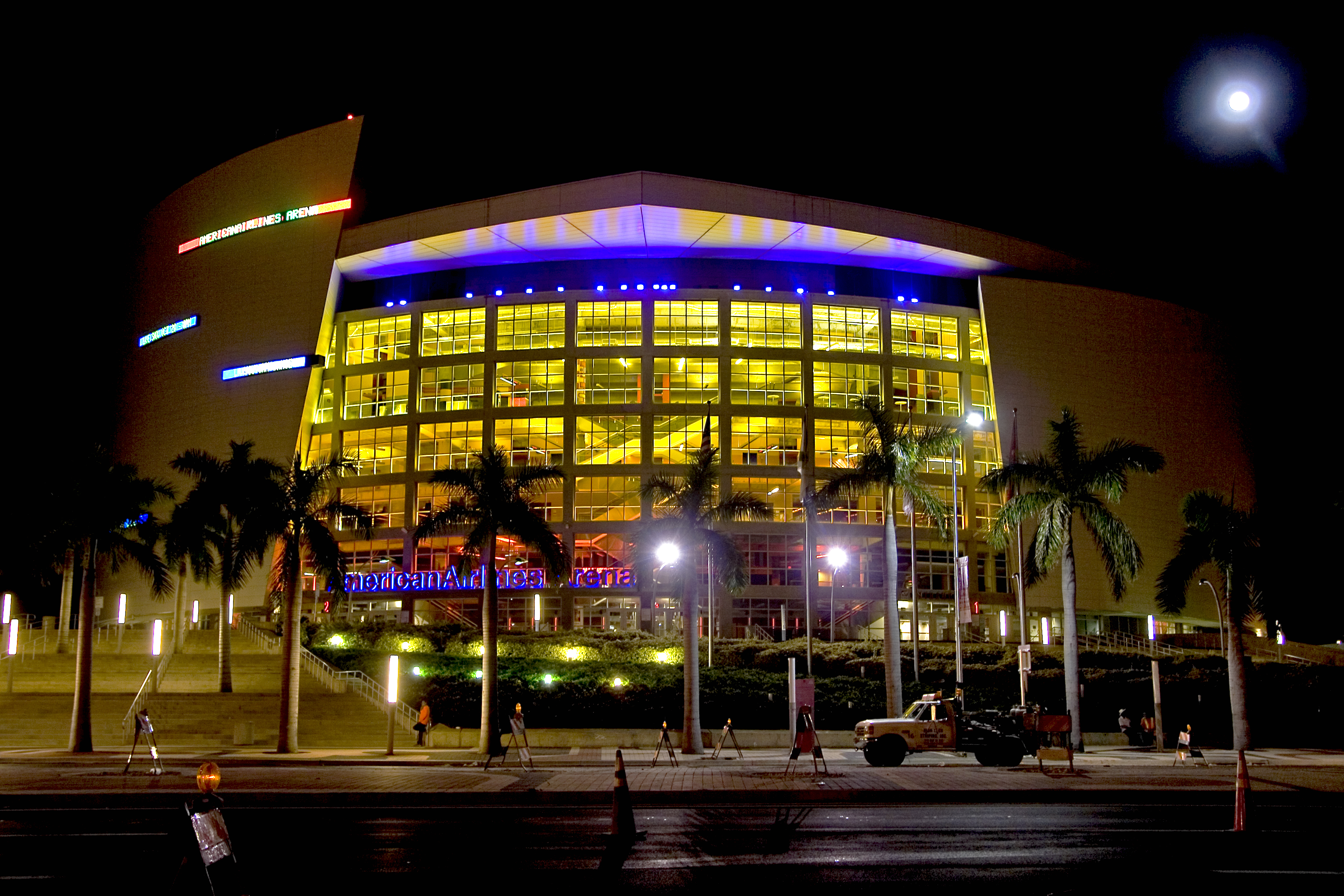
Kaseya Center, home of the Miami Heat

=== Museums and historic sites ===
- Pérez Art Museum Miami
- Historical Museum of Southern Florida
- Miami Children's Museum
- Wagner Home
- Freedom Tower
- City of Miami Cemetery
- Downtown Miami Historic District
- Lummus Park Historic District
- Miami Circle

=== Theatres and performance arts ===
- Adrienne Arsht Center for the Performing Arts
  - Ziff Ballet Opera House
  - Knight Concert Hall
  - Florida Grand Opera
- Gusman Center for the Performing Arts
- Miami City Ballet
- Miami Wind Symphony

=== Libraries ===
- Miami Main Library

=== Places of worship ===
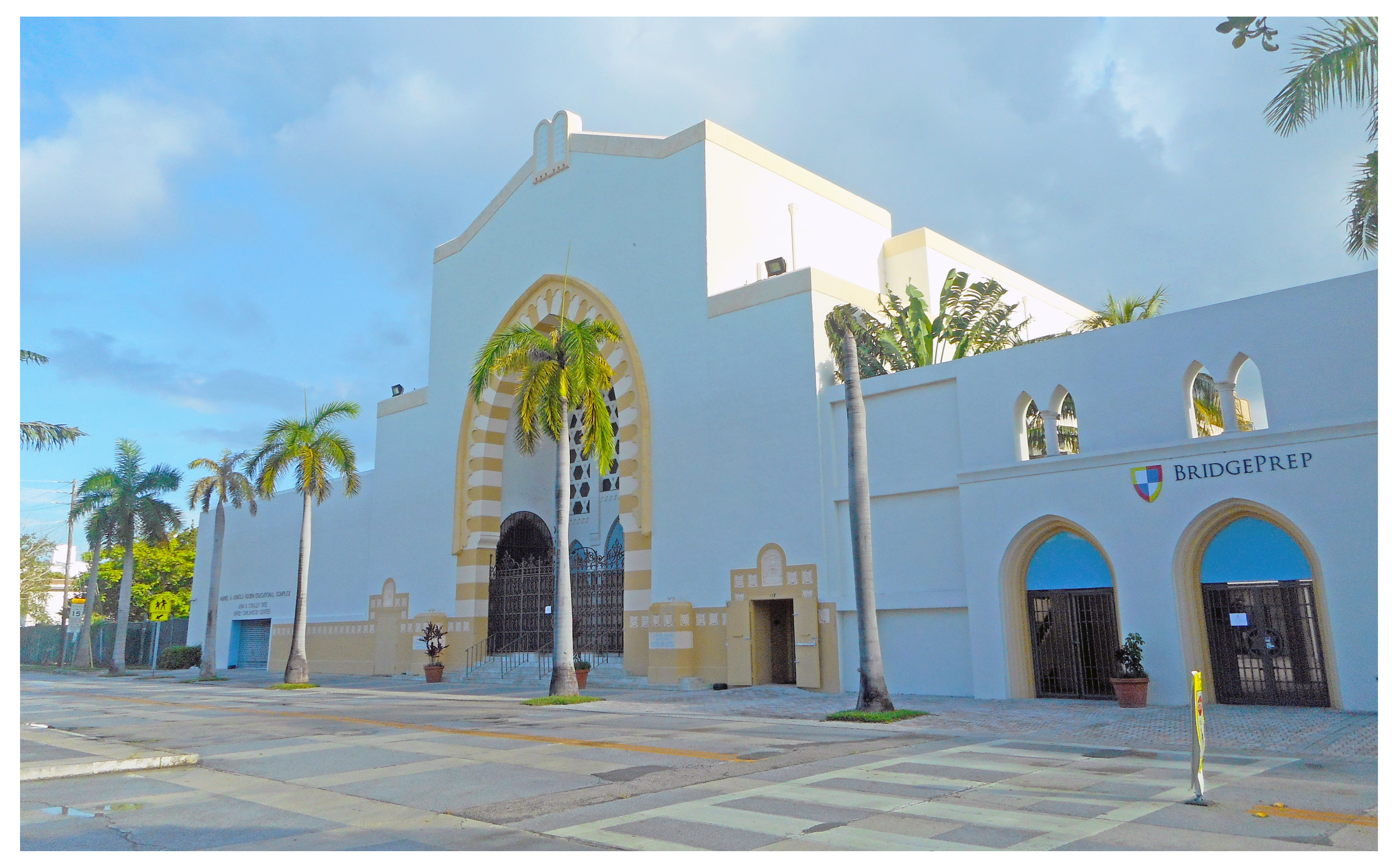
Temple Israel of Greater Miami

- Central Baptist Church (Built in 1925)
- First Church of Christ Scientist (1925)
- First Presbyterian Church (1898)
- First United Methodist Church (1966)
- Gesu Catholic Church (1896)
- Greater Bethel AME Church (1927)
- Miami Central Spanish Seventh-day Adventist Church (Miami, Florida) (1925)
- St. Jude Catholic Church (1946)
- Temple Israel of Greater Miami (1926)
- Trinity Episcopal Cathedral (1925)
- Immanuel Lutheran Church
- Temple Israel of Greater Miami
- Central Korean Presbyterian Church
- The Shul of Downtown and Brickell

=== Bookstores ===
- Books and Books – Wachovia Financial Center
- Miami Book Fair International, an annual literary festival held at Miami Dade College

=== Festivals and events ===
- DWNTWN Concert Series, free performances every 2nd Friday of the month at 5:30pm, Bayfront Park
- New Year's Big Orange Drop, Bayfront Park
- Miami Marathon, marathon held in January
- Ultra Music Festival, electronic music festival held in March
- Miami International Film Festival, held in March
- Winter Music Conference, held in March
- Independence Day Celebration, Bayfront Park
- Miami Book Fair International, literary festival held in November
- Art Basel Miami, art exhibition held in December
- Miami International Boat Show
- The Arts Of Storytelling, held in March
- The Best of the Best Reggae Concert

=== Sports facilities ===
- Kaseya Center, home of the Miami Heat

== Downtown skyscrapers ==
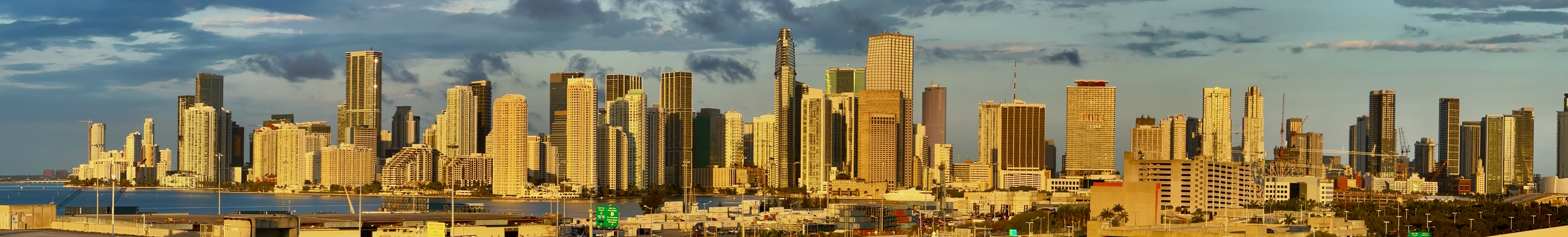
Greater Downtown Miami as seen from PortMiami in April 2025

== See also ==
- Midtown Miami
- Downtown Miami Historic District
