= Miami Worldcenter =

Coordinates: 25.7819°N 80.1906°W

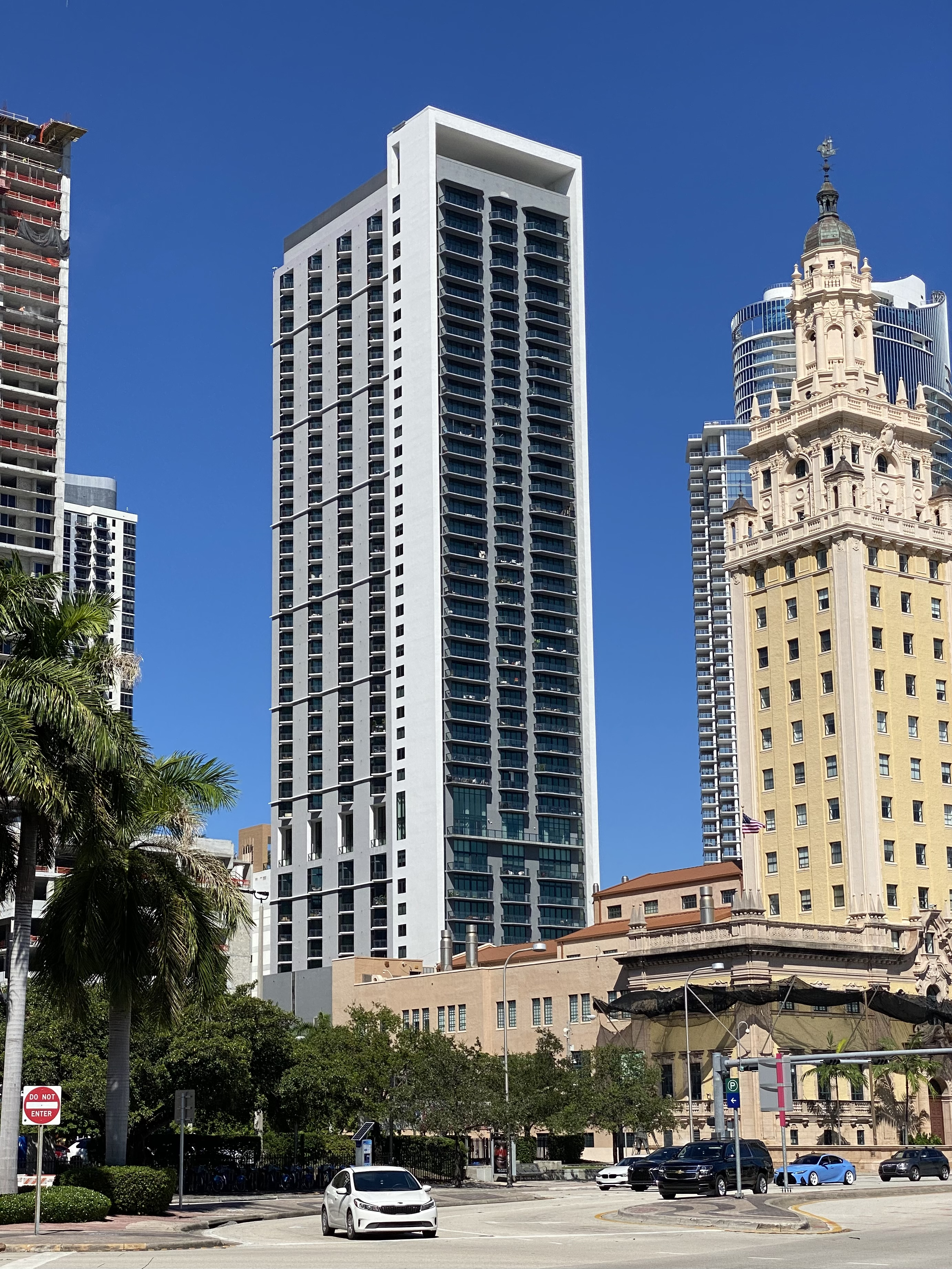
- Bezel, one of the multiple highrises of Miami Worldcenter. The Paramount Miami Worldcenter is behind the Freedom Tower.
- Interactive map of the Miami Worldcenter area

General information
- Status: Completed
- Type: Mixed use
- Location: Park West, Miami, Florida, United States
- Opening: May 22, 2025

Design and construction
- Structural engineer: DeSimone Consulting Engineers

Miami Worldcenter is a large mixed-use complex consisting of residential high-rises, a hotel, convention center, shopping mall and lifestyle center, located in the Park West neighborhood of Miami, Florida. Situated just north of the Central Business District, the complex spans ten blocks and over 27 acres of land.

== Design history ==
The hotel and convention center were planned to be part of the same 55-story building, known as the Marriott Marquis Miami Worldcenter, but this tower and exhibition space was cancelled. The hotel would have included 1,800 rooms over the approximately 600,000 square feet (55,742 m^{2}) convention center.

One proposed residential building known as the Miami Worldcenter Signature Tower may rise to the maximum 749 feet (228 m) above sea level permitted in that area.

Miami Worldcenter connects with the Brightline higher-speed rail system's MiamiCentral station, and is adjacent to the Overtown Metrorail station. Additionally, the Freedom Tower Metromover station located on the east side of the property was renovated in 2021 and 2022, similar to the redeveloped Eighth Street station at Brickell City Centre in Brickell.

In November 2015, Taubman announced that it would not be developing an enclosed regional mall as demand moved away from enclosed malls; instead, the plans were changed to reflect an open-air development better suited for Miami's sunny weather. Macy's and Bloomingdale's had originally signed on as anchors, but pulled out when the mall's format was changed.

== Skyscrapers ==
The complex features several high-rises. On 14 January 2019, the first development at Miami Worldcenter, the Caoba apartment tower, was opened. Paramount Miami Worldcenter opened in 2019.

- Paramount Miami Worldcenter, 699 feet (213 m). Completed in 2019.
- Bezel at Miami Worldcenter, 493 feet (150 m). Completed in 2021.
- Miami World Tower I, 579 feet (176 m). Completed in 2024.
- Flow House, 413 feet (126 m), a pair of towers. The first one was completed in 2019 as Caoba Miami Worldcenter.
- CitizenM Hotel Miami Worldcenter, 136 feet (41 m). Completed in 2023.
- The JEM, 699 feet (213 m). Foundation poured in 2025.

A 60-story Marriott Marquis Miami Worldcenter hotel was proposed for the complex, but plans for the tower were canceled in 2021. Another tower, the 50-story mixed-use tower Legacy Miami Worldcenter, began construction in 2021 but progress was halted in 2024 due to construction delays and foreclosure proceedings.

== See also ==
- List of tallest buildings in Miami
- Brickell City Centre
