= Brickell =

- Neighborhood of Miami
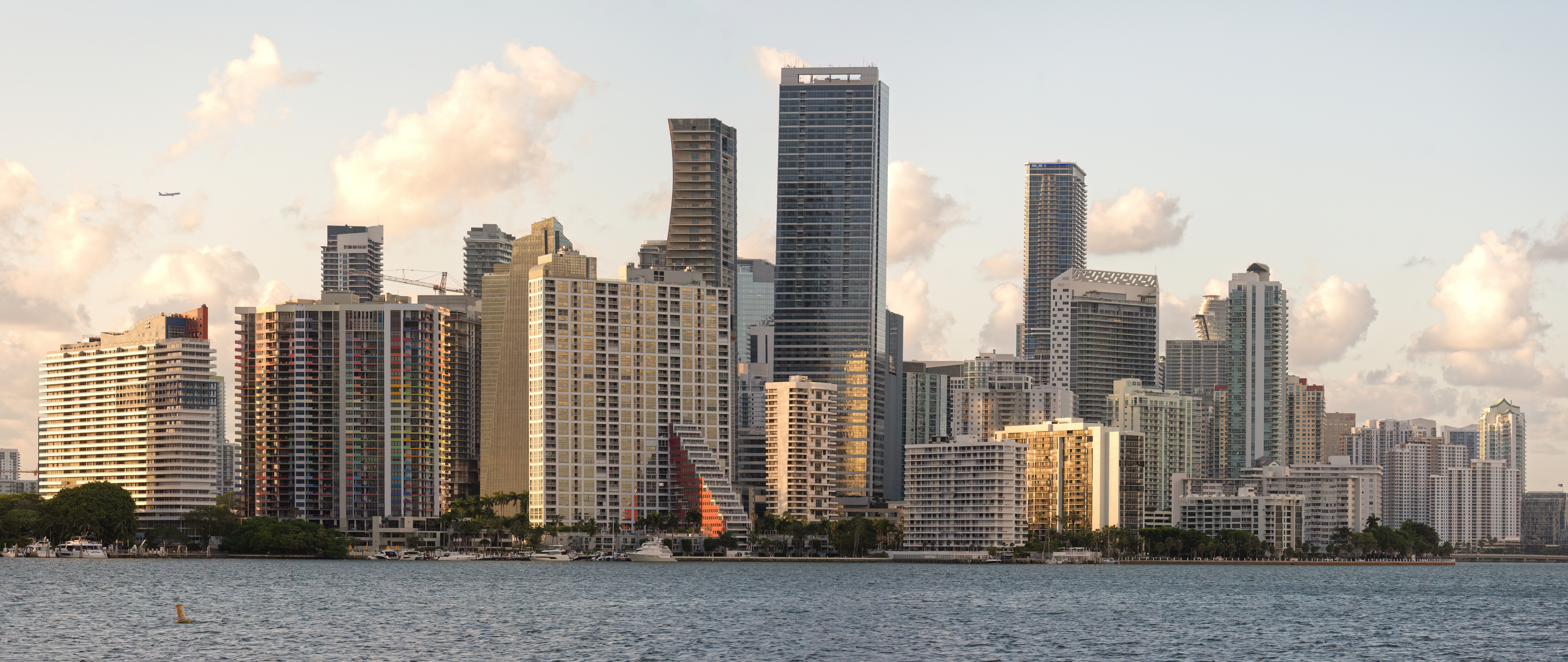
- The Brickell skyline as seen from Biscayne Bay, April 2025
- Nickname: Financial District
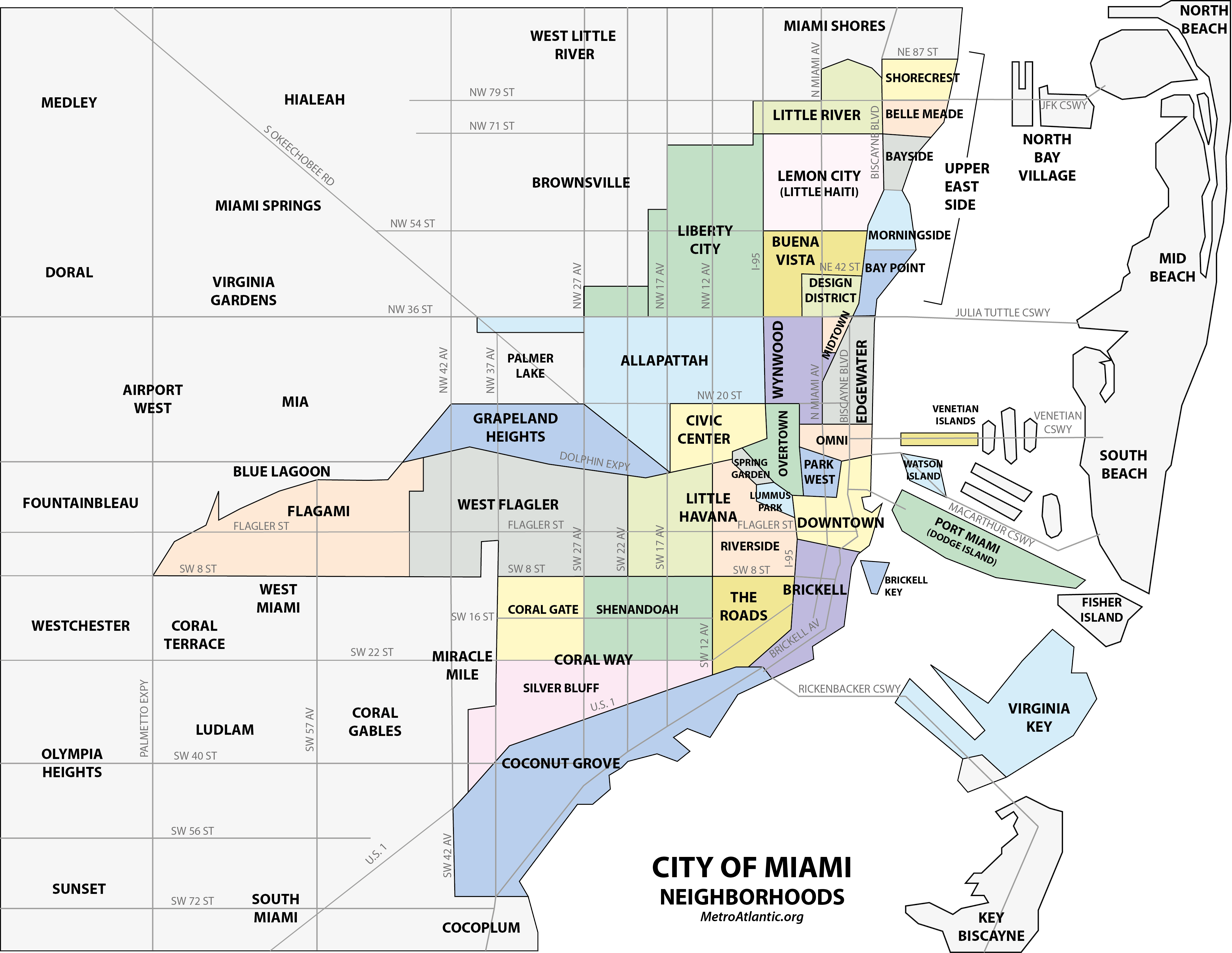
- Brickell neighborhood within the City of Miami
- Coordinates: 25.758°N 80.193°W
- Country: United States
- State: Florida
- County: Miami-Dade County
- City: Miami
- Settled: 1830s
- Incorporated into the City of Miami: 1896

Government
  - City of Miami Commissioner: Ken Russell (D)
  - Miami-Dade Commissioners: Eileen Higgns (D)
  - House of Representatives: Nicholas Duran(D)
  - State Senate: Ileana Garcia (R)
  - U.S. House: Maria Elvira Salazar (R)

Area
  - Total: 1.19 sq mi (3.1 km^{2})
- Elevation: 9.8 ft (3 m)
- Highest elevation: 26 ft (8 m)
- Lowest elevation: 0 ft (0 m)

Population (2014)
  - Total: 32,489
  - Density: 27,302/sq mi (10,541/km^{2})
  - Demonym: Brickellite
- Time zone: UTC-05 (EST)
- ZIP Code: 33129, 33130, 33131
- Area codes: 305, 786
- Website: Brickell Homeowners Association

Brickell (/ˈbrɪkəl/ BRIK-əl) is the financial district of the city of Miami, Florida. It is directly south of the Central Business District and the Miami River. Brickell is the second-largest financial district in the United States.

Brickell serves as the core of Miami’s massive high-rise and skyscraper boom, featuring a dense of continuous wall of towers along Biscayne Bay. Brickell overtook the city's central business district to the north, as one of the largest financial districts in the United States. With a fast-growing residential population, Brickell is Miami's most dense neighborhood, with a 2024 population of about 40,000.

== History ==
With rapid urbanization over the decades, very little remains of the original character of Brickell. Brickell was originally platted for mansions and large homes by Mary Brickell, which thus led to the name "Millionaire's Row." With the growth of the city, especially in the 1970s onwards, Brickell's character began to change with the construction of high-rise office towers along Brickell Avenue, and high-rise residential towers in lower Brickell, south of SE 15th Road (Broadway). A commercial boom in the 1980s brought mass construction of office towers to Brickell, and subsequent construction, would further change the neighborhood into the dense, urban, residential and commercial neighborhood it is today. Some of the historic buildings remaining in Brickell can be seen in the photos below. While not a registered historic landmark, Brickell is home to Tobacco Road, which claimed to be Miami's oldest bar, in business since 1912, with a now-demolished building built in 1915.

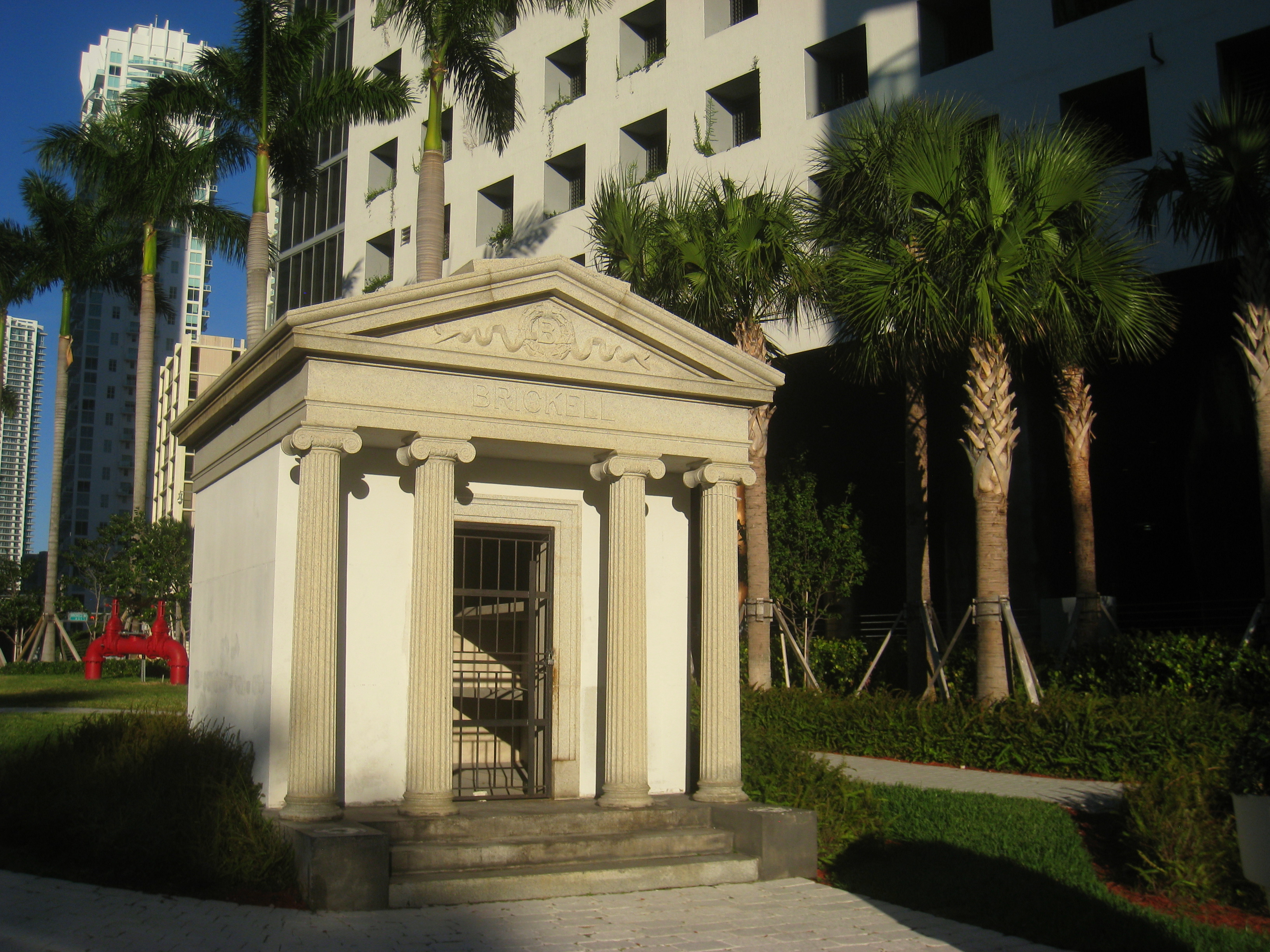
Brickell Mausoleum at Brickell Park, built in 1921

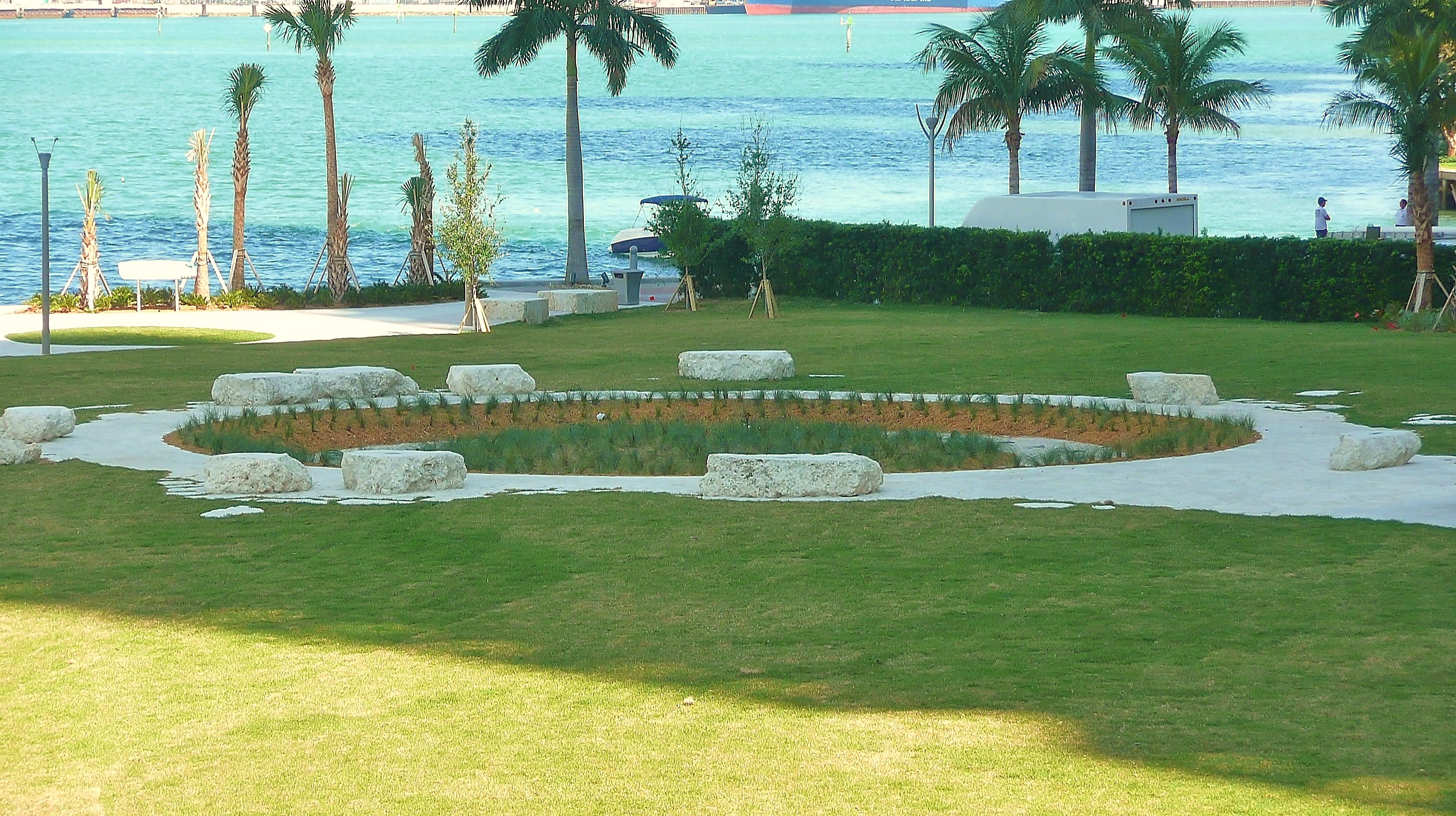
Miami Circle, Tequesta Indian burial grounds, circa 310-10 AD

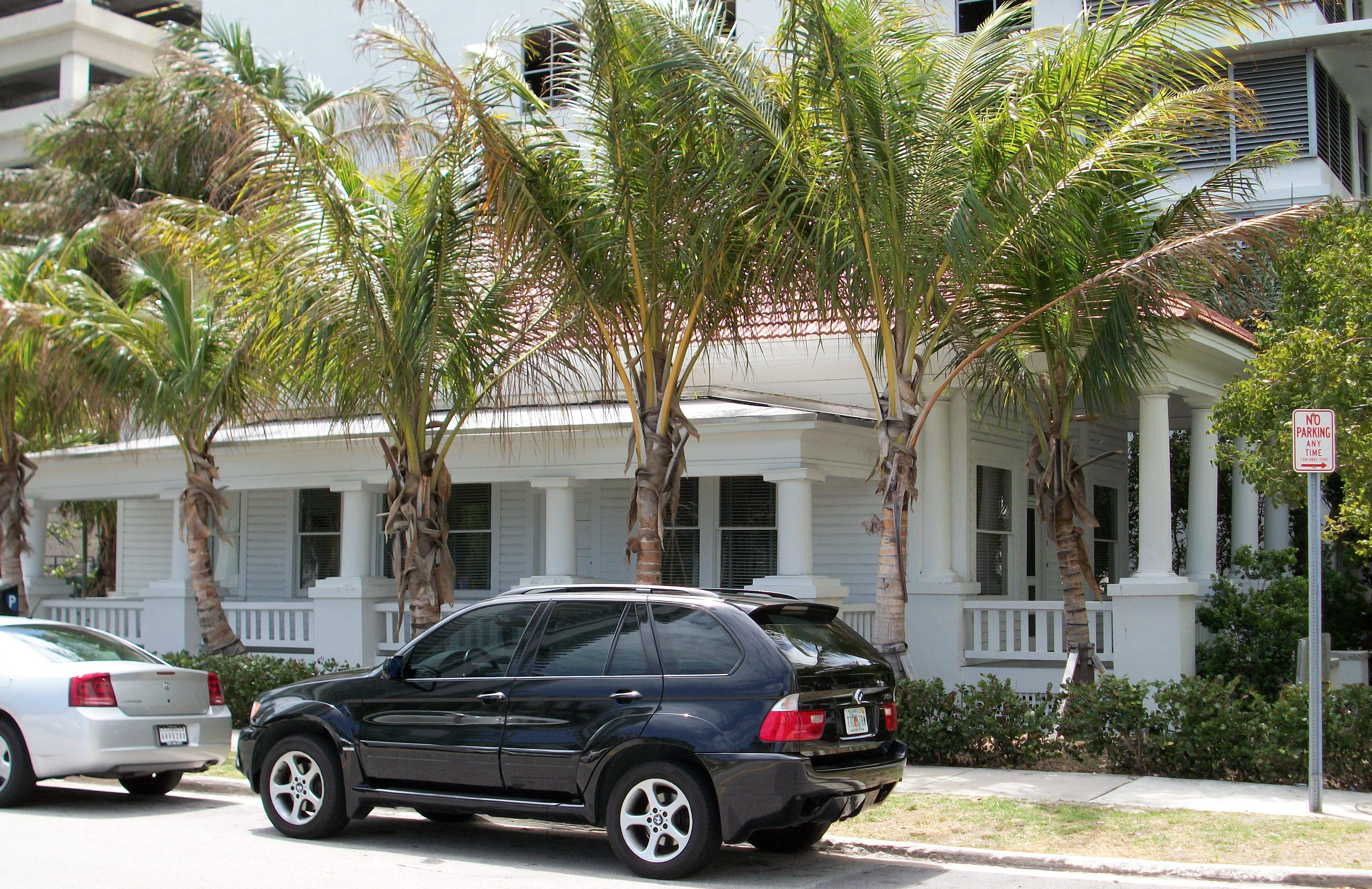
Dr. James M. Jackson Office, first physician's office in Miami, 1905

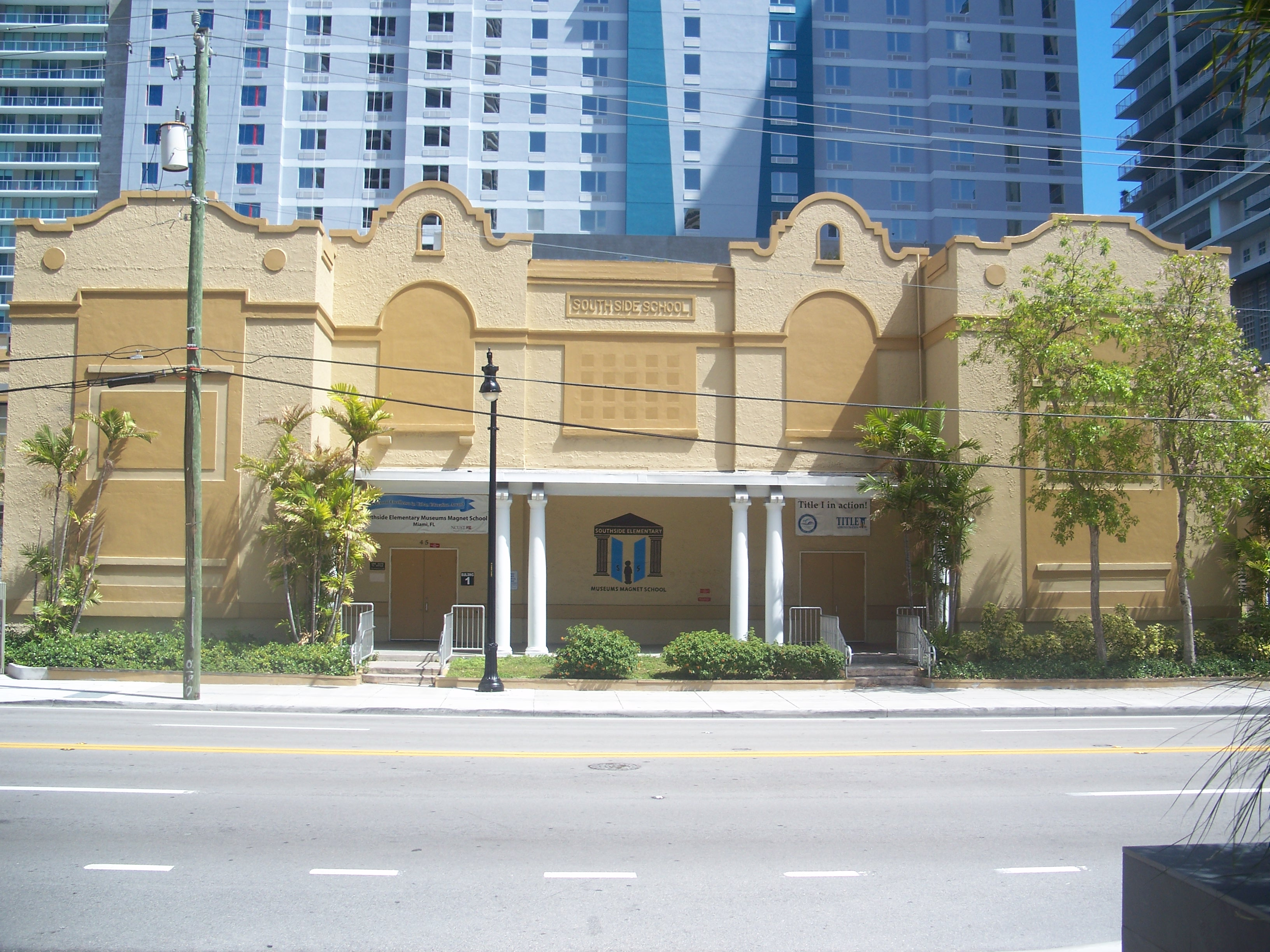
Southside School, 1900-1924

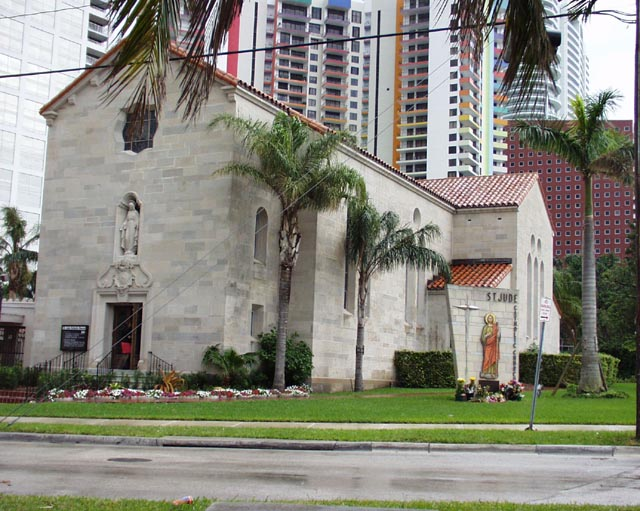
St. Jude Catholic Church, 1946

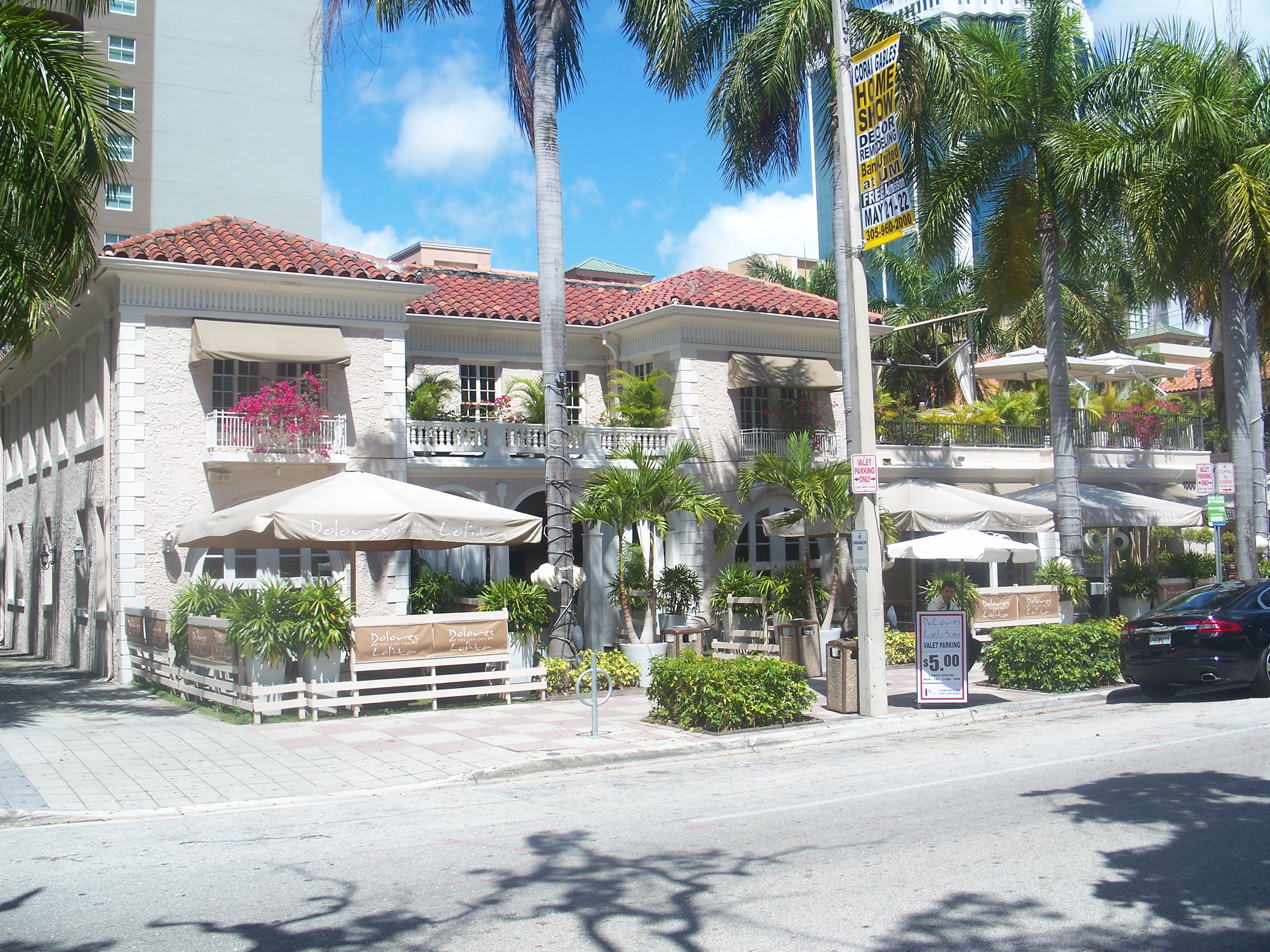
Fire Station No. 4, 1922

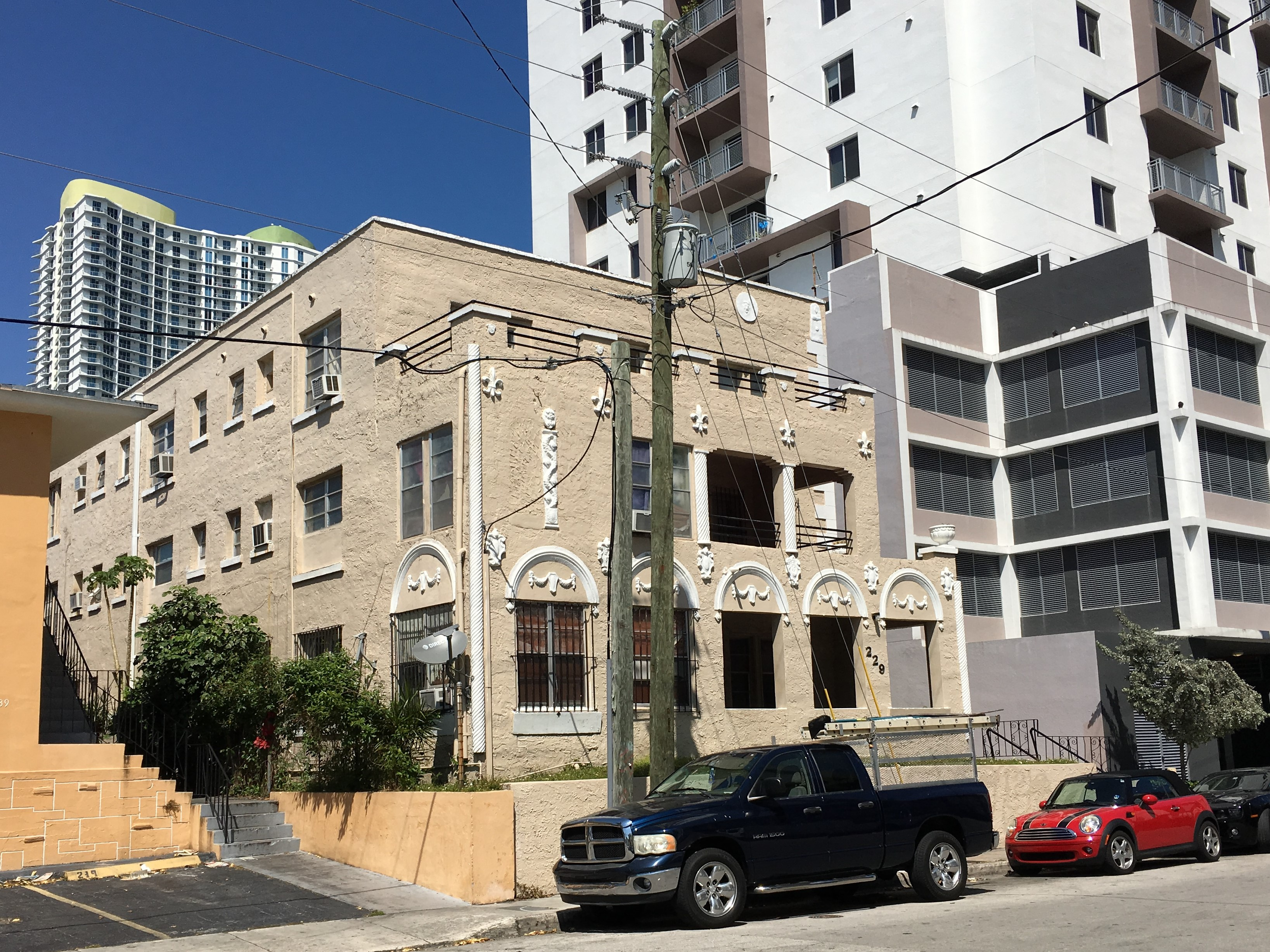
A former apartment building on SW 9th Street, built in 1925, which is currently the site of a new luxury condominium called Smart Brickell.

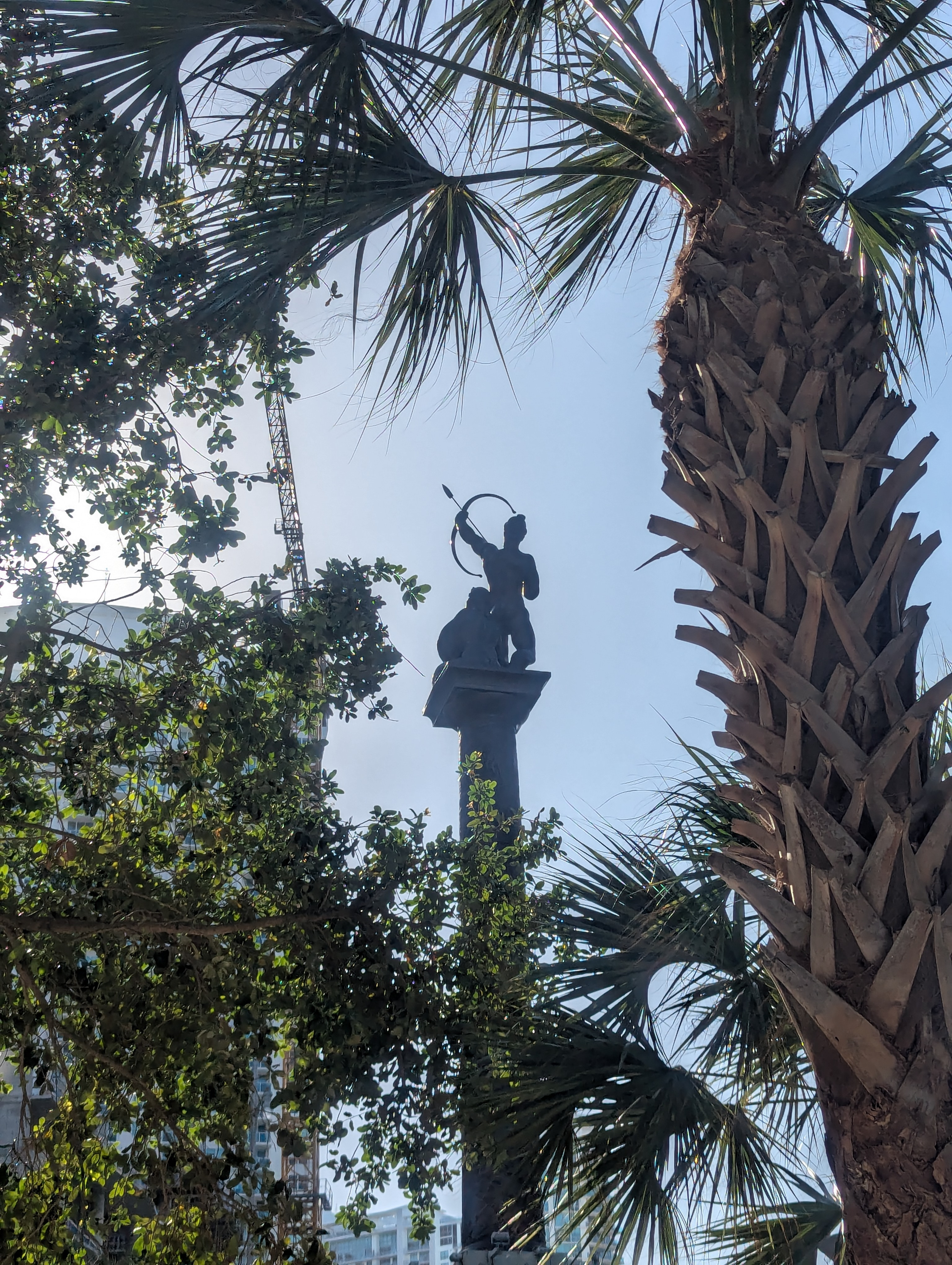
Pillar of History by Manuel Carbonell, viewed from the ground; the statue is a symbol of the district

== Geography ==
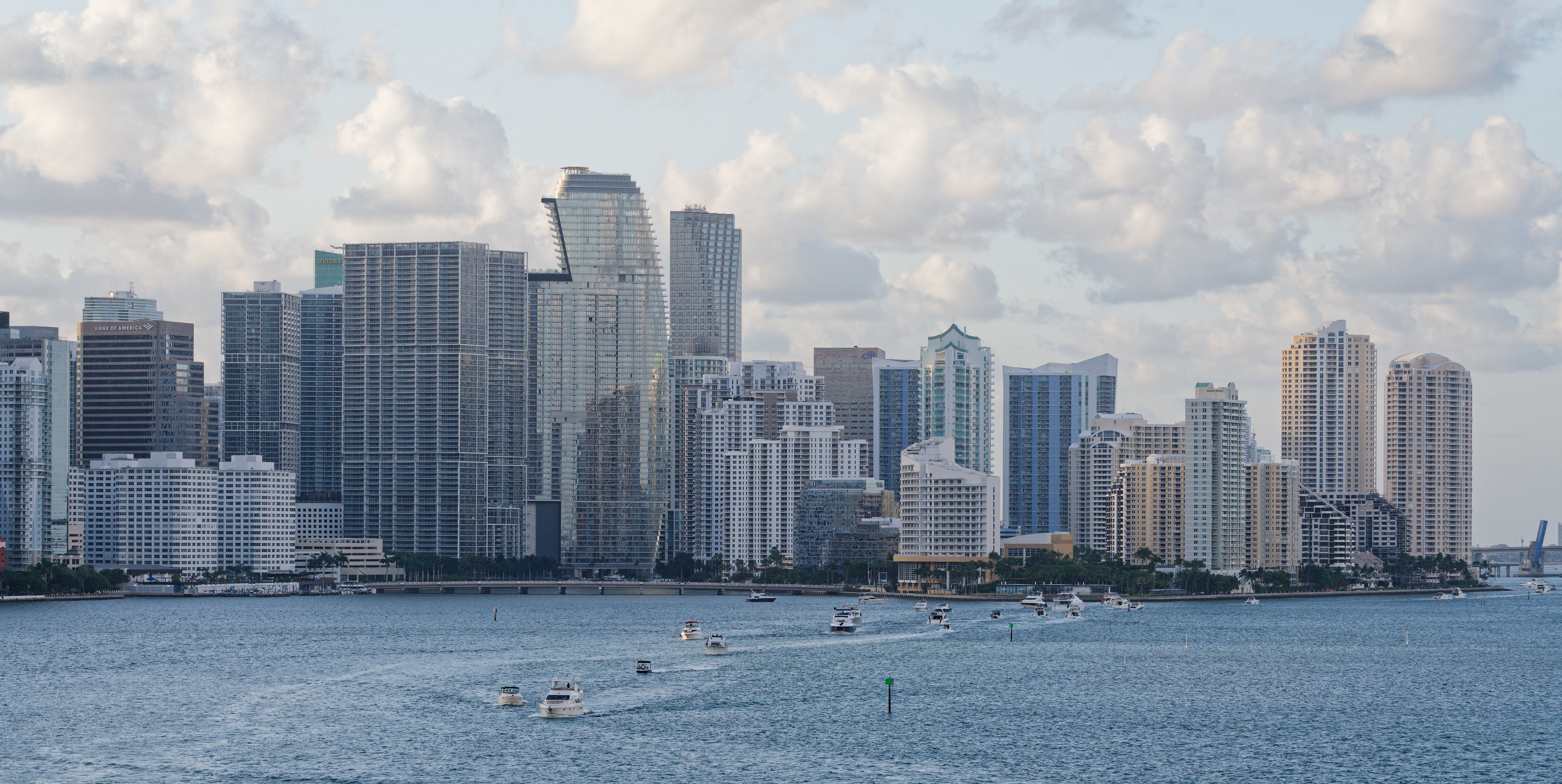
Brickell and Brickell Key lie right alongside Biscayne Bay

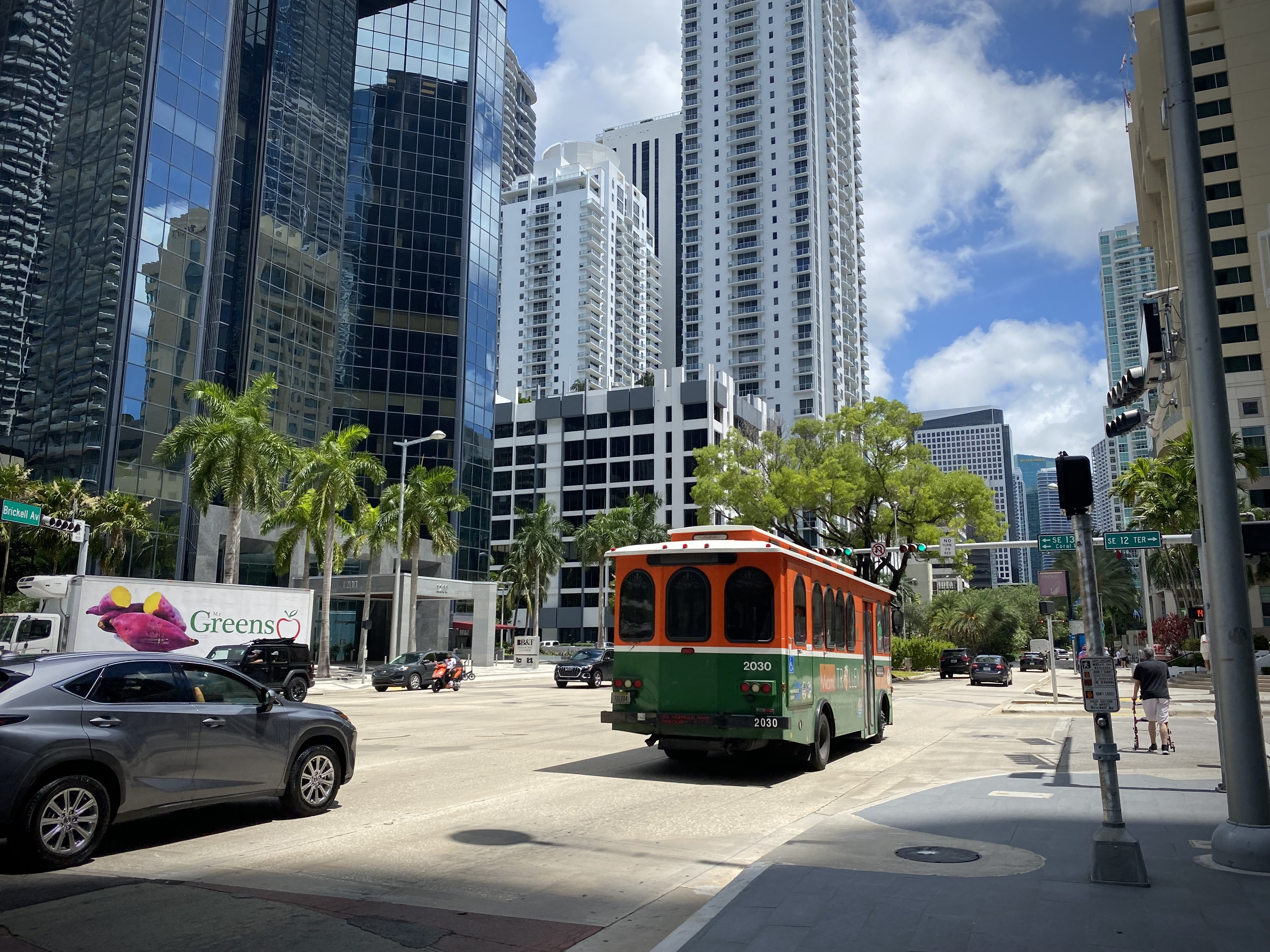
Brickell Avenue is the main thoroughfare

Brickell lies immediately east of Interstate 95, including Southwest 3rd Avenue, and extends to the Biscayne Bay. Brickell extends north to the Miami River and south to SW 26th Road (the Rickenbacker Causeway). The neighborhood comprises mostly financial and residential buildings north of Broadway (Southwest 15th Road), and mostly residential buildings south of Broadway. Brickell is home to 31,759 year-round residents.

Although Brickell was known as a financial district, in recent years, construction of numerous residential and mixed-use towers has reshaped the neighborhood into a residential community. Brickell now offers residents a walkable lifestyle, where work and entertainment converge. Ongoing development has expanded the dense urban core of Brickell from Brickell Avenue west to Interstate 95, making the Metrorail line and new and expanding Underline Park the center of the neighborhood. As of 2010, 80,000 residents live in Brickell, among them, famous celebrities such as José José, Luis Miguel, Clinton Portis, Jennifer Lopez and Marc Anthony.

Within Brickell is Mary Brickell Village, which was the center of the neighborhood's entertainment district when it opened in 2006. It remains to be a popular gathering spot that includes restaurants, boutique retail shops, and a variety of service providers. The project design was inspired by a mediterranean-style village with open squares that facilitate social gatherings and entertainment events. Its design now contrasts to the steel Manhattan-like skyscrapers that surround it, but offers a welcoming scale more akin to coastal Mediterranean villages in Europe. Plans are in place to redevelop a portion of this space.

To the north of Brickell is Downtown, with most of the area's public elementary schools and Miami Dade College's Wolfson Campus. Downtown is also home to the Miami Main Library, as well as various parks, theatres, museums, and sporting venues. South of Brickell is Coconut Grove, with Mercy Hospital, CocoWalk, Dinner Key, Villa Vizcaya, as well as many historic sites and parks. Coconut Grove also has many of Miami's best private schools, such as Ransom Everglades, Carrollton School of the Sacred Heart, and Immaculata-Lasalle High School.

West of Brickell is Little Havana, extending from Interstate 95 westward. East of Brickell is Biscayne Bay, and eastward along the Rickenbacker Causeway, is Virginia Key and Key Biscayne. Both keys have many public beaches, nature preserves, parks, and various other cultural venues. Also east, along the MacArthur Causeway is South Beach.

== Demographics ==
Historical population
Census	Pop.	Note	%±
2000	13,584		—
2010	27,776		104.5%
2014 (est.)	32,489		17.0%

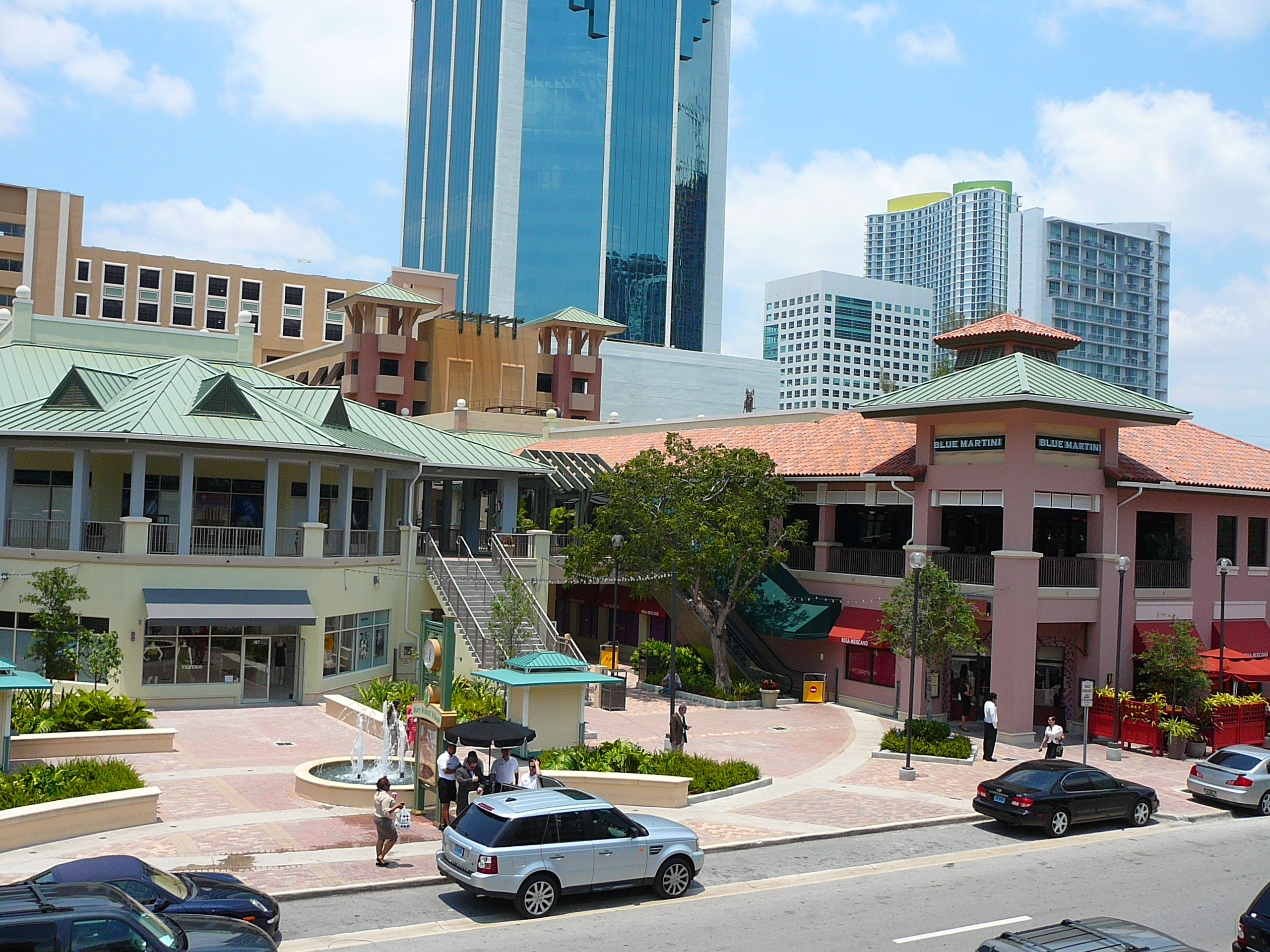
The Shops at Mary Brickell Village is a popular dining and shopping destination in Brickell.

As of 2010, the population of Brickell had 27,776 people, with a population density of 37,622 per square mile, making it one of the densest neighborhoods in the United States. In the 2010 US Census, the racial makeup of Brickell was 62.0% Hispanic of any race, 33.2% White (non-Hispanic), 1.6% Asian, and 1.4% Black. The zip codes for Brickell include 33129, 33130, and 33131. The area covers 1.084 square miles (2.81 km^{2}). Many of its daily occupants work in banking, law, and finance.

As of 2000, there were 5,557 males and 5,972 females. The median age for males was 38.4 years old, while the median age for females was 40.6 years old. The average household size had 1.8 people, while the average family size had 2.6 members. The percentage of married-couple families (among all households) was 30.3%, while the percentage of married-couple families with children (among all households) was 8.5%, and the percentage of single-mother households (among all households) was 4.3%. The percentage of never-married males 15 years old and over was 20.2%, while the percentage of never-married females 15 years old and over was 16.0%.

As of 2000, the percentage of people who speak English not well or not at all made up 27.7% of the population. The percentage of residents born in Florida was 17.1%, the percentage of people born in another U.S. state was 13.7%, and the percentage of native residents but born outside the U.S. was 3.9%, while the percentage of foreign-born residents was 65.3%.

Brickell is a highly educated and affluent neighborhood. As of 2014, an estimated 75% of residents older than 25 hold at least a bachelors level degree with 34% holding an advanced degree. The approximate average household income of $125,500 is more than twice the average for the City of Miami.

== Economy ==
Brickell is a dense, high-rise residential neighborhood with many upscale, luxury condominium and apartment towers. Brickell is home to many popular Miami restaurants, shops, art galleries, and places of entertainment. A few hundred feet east of the northeastern side of Brickell is Brickell Key, an island of high-rise residential and hotel towers, including the Mandarin Oriental. As of 2009, over 190,000 office employees work in greater Downtown. Today, greater Downtown Miami is one of the fastest-growing neighborhoods in Miami, booming from 40,000 residents in 2000 to 80,000 in 2010. Brickell is served by the Miami Metrorail at the Brickell station and by 5 stations of the Metromover's Brickell Loop.

=== Banking and consulates ===
As South Florida's financial district, Brickell is the core of Miami's banking, investment, and financial sectors. Additionally, along with Downtown Miami, Brickell has most of the state's foreign consulates, including the consulates of Argentina, Brazil, Chile, Dominican Republic, Ecuador, France, Guatemala, Japan, Mexico, the Netherlands, Peru, Switzerland, Turkey, Trinidad and Tobago, and the United Kingdom, amongst others.

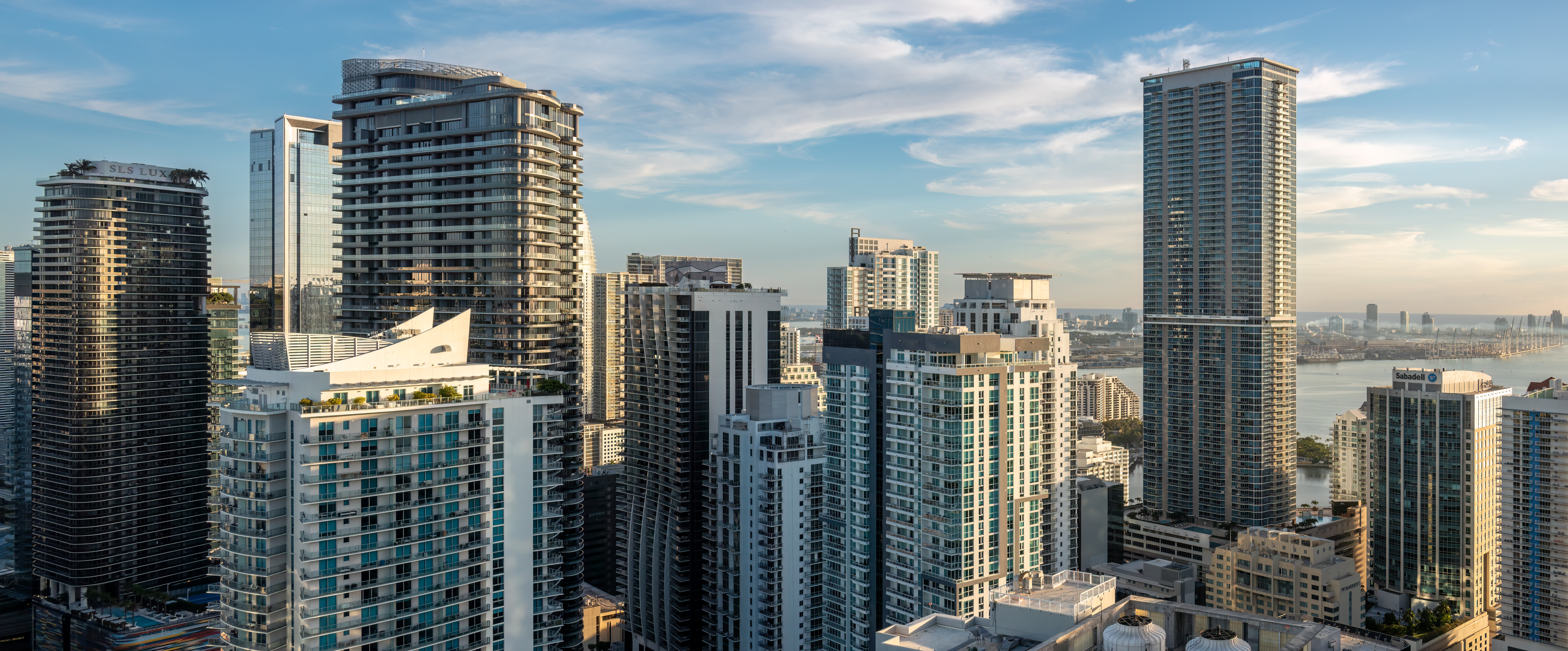
Brickell neighborhood skyline

== Education and institutions ==
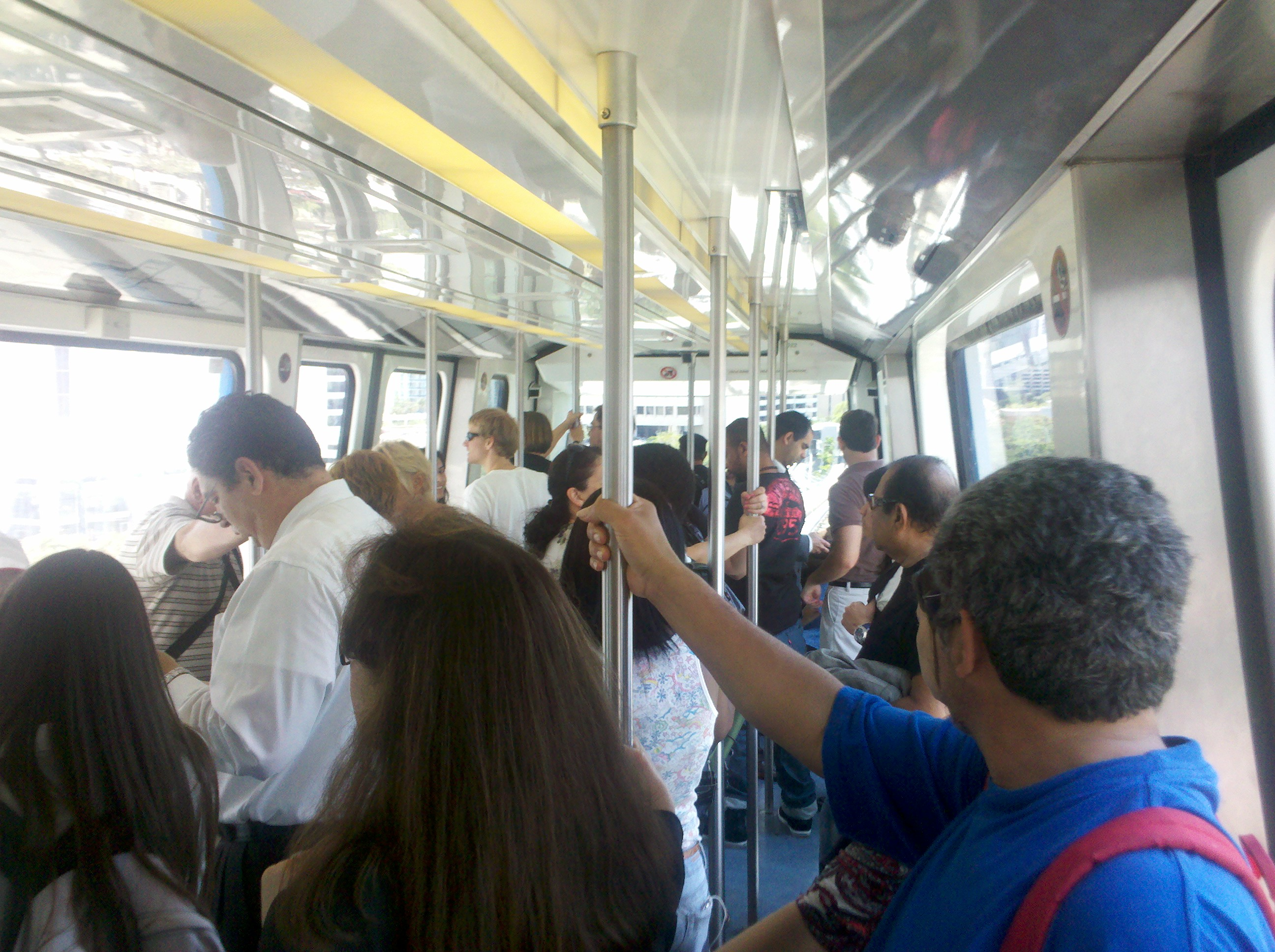
Metromover is a popular way of getting around the Downtown area. It connects the area's neighborhoods.

=== Elementary schools ===
Miami-Dade County Public Schools operates area public schools:

- Southside Elementary School

Private schools:

- First Presbyterian International Christian School (Christian)
- Gordon Day School (Jewish)
- Prima Casa Montessori School

=== Colleges and universities ===
- Florida International University (Downtown Campus), a public university
- University of Miami, a private research university in neighboring Coral Gables

=== Libraries ===
- Miami Main Library

=== Places of worship ===
Places of worship in the Brickell neighborhood include:

- First Presbyterian Church of Miami
- Crossbridge Church in Brickell
- St. Jude Melkite Catholic Church
- The Rok Family Shul: Chabad Downtown Jewish Center
- Beth David Congregation

== Transportation ==
Brickell is served by Metrobus throughout the area, the Miami Metrorail, and the Metromover:

Metrorail:

- Brickell (SW 11th Street and 1st Avenue)

Metromover:

- Brickell Loop

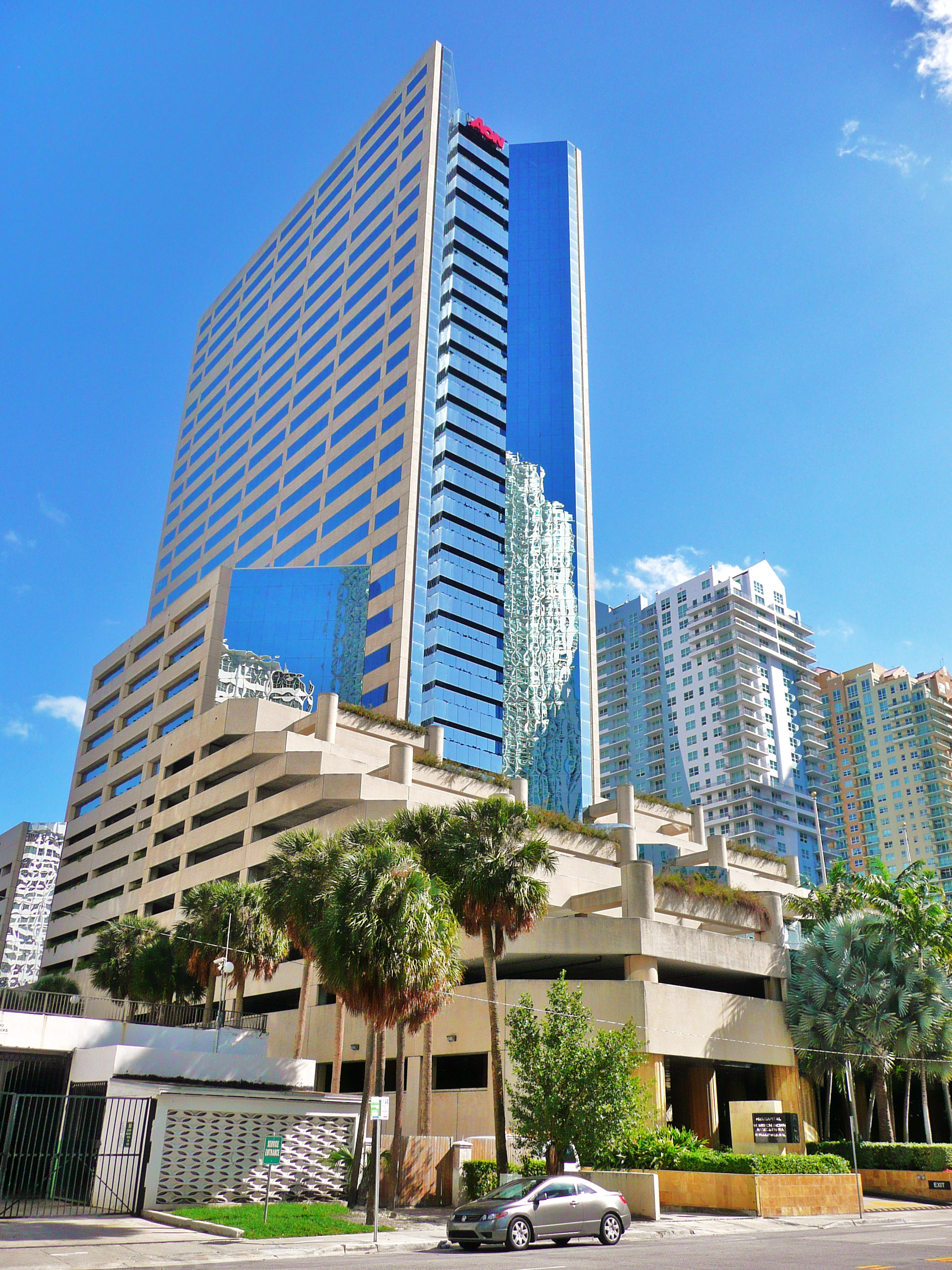
Aon Benfield Inc., a company in Brickell within the 1001 Brickell Bay Tower

Public Transportation in the Downtown/Brickell area is used more than in any other part of Miami and is a vital part of Brickell's life. Metrorail, Miami's heavy rail system, has one station in Brickell at the Brickell Station. In addition to Metrorail, the Metromover train system runs 3 lines throughout Downtown (the Downtown Loop, the Omni Loop, and the Brickell Loop). The Metromover connects with Metrorail and is free. Metromover stations can be found at roughly every two blocks in Brickell.

Metrorail has stops throughout Miami with connections to Miami International Airport, all Miami-Dade County bus lines, Tri-Rail and Amtrak. The main bus station in Downtown is located next to the Arsht Center at the Adrienne Arsht Center Station. Plans are in place to connect the Metrorail to Midtown and South Beach.

As an urban and pedestrian-friendly area with an extensive public transit network, Brickell (along with Downtown, Omni, and South Beach) is one of the areas in Miami where a car-free lifestyle is commonplace. Many Brickellites get around by foot, bicycle, scooter, Metromover, taxi, or ride share app. The Metromover is a popular alternative to walking in the area, especially on rainy, hot or cold days, as the Metromover is free, and stations are located roughly every two blocks throughout the area.

The City of Miami, along with the Downtown Development Authority, has begun bicycle initiatives promoting citywide bike parking and bike lanes, which have made bicycling much more popular for residents. Bike lanes and bike sharrows are currently planned for the majority of Downtown streets to be painted by the end of 2010. Decobike, the popular bike-sharing program in Miami Beach, announced a launch in Brickell/Downtown Miami in mid-2014. The Venetian Causeway is a bicycle commuter route that connects South Beach to Downtown. The Rickenbacker Causeway is very popular on weekends for recreational bicyclists, and bicycles can outnumber cars on the causeway.

=== Taxis and ride share services ===
Taxis and ride share services, like Uber and Alto, are popular in Brickell, especially from Brickell to South Beach, Design District or to Coconut Grove. Since many Brickell residents choose to not have cars, taxis and ride share services are also popular for rides within Downtown neighborhoods, especially after midnight when the Metromover stops running. Taxis can be hailed on the street or telephoned, and ride sharing services can be ordered using mobile apps.

== Media ==
Brickell Magazine is a magazine covering Brickell and Downtown Miami. Launched in 2008, it is published by TAG Media, Inc.

== Brickell skyscrapers ==
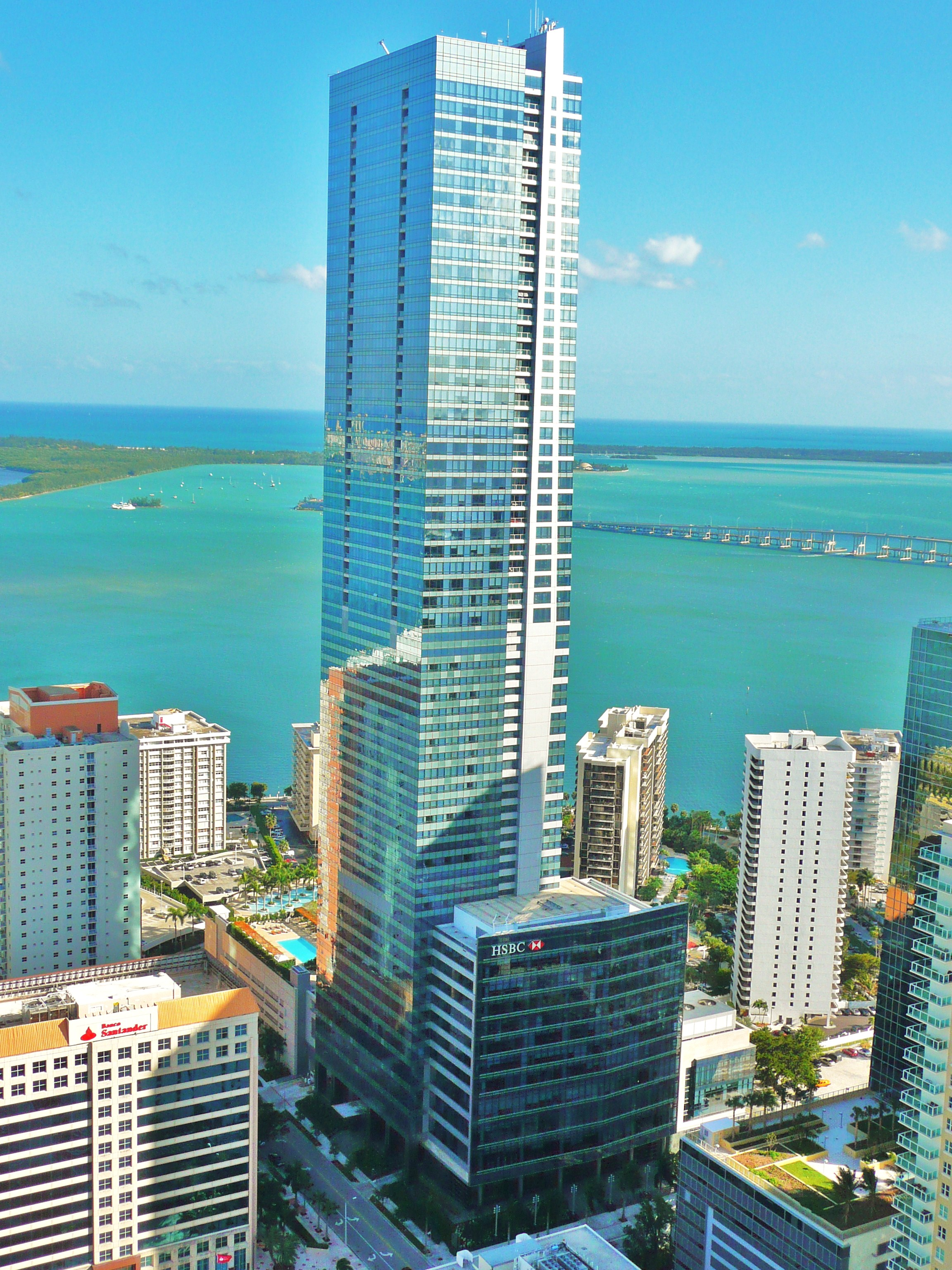
Florida's previous tallest building, the Four Seasons Hotel and Tower, is in Brickell.

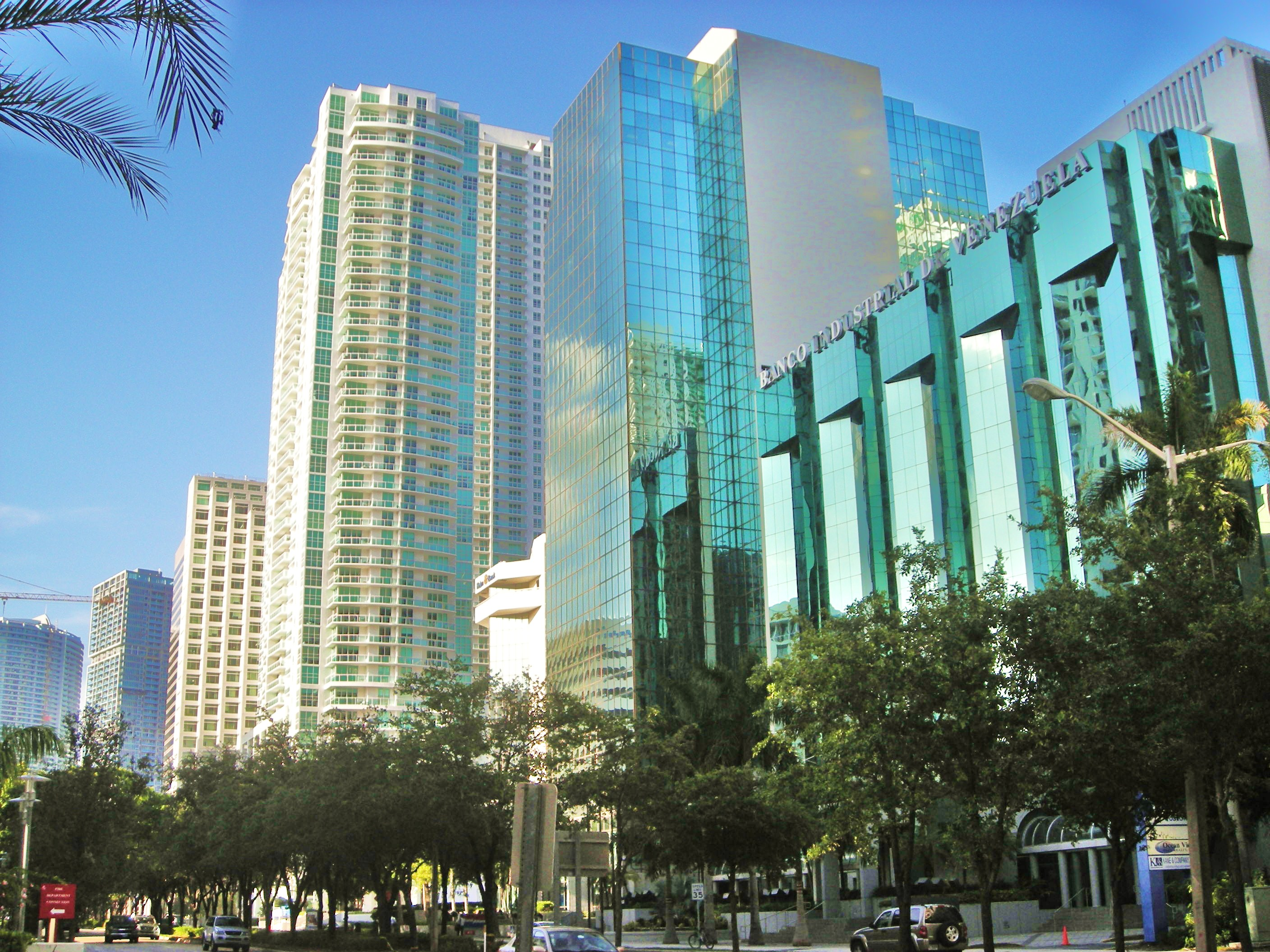
Looking north on Brickell Avenue.

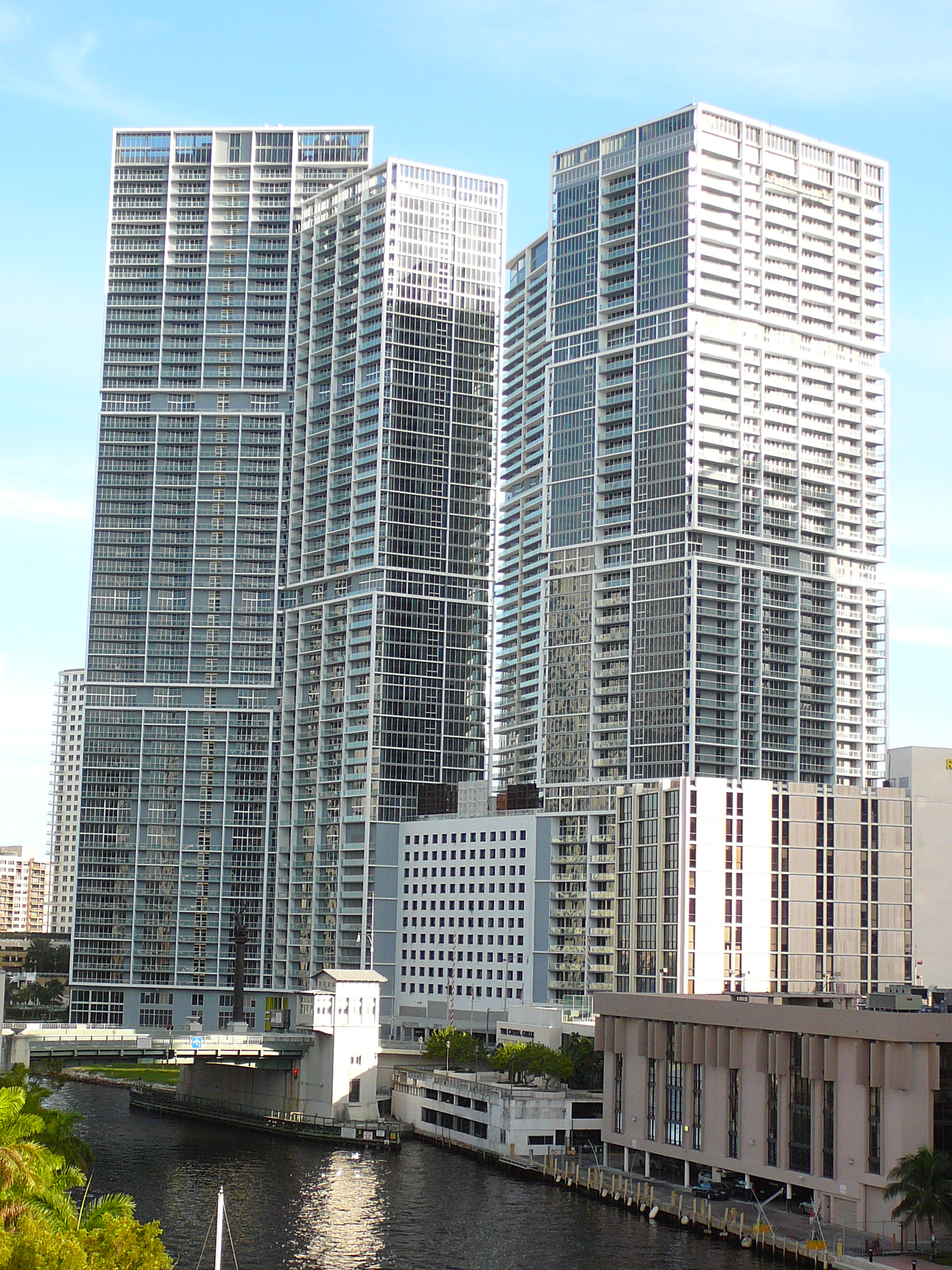
The Icon Brickell complex marks the northern entrance to the Brickell Financial District on Brickell Avenue.

=== Office towers ===
- 830 Brickell
- Brickell World Plaza
- Colonnade Plaza
- Four Seasons Hotel Miami
- 1450 Brickell
- Brickell Arch
- Sabadell Financial Center
- 701 Brickell Avenue
- Colonnade Plaza
- 1001 Brickell Bay Tower
- Latitude One International Business Center
- Brickell Bayview Center

=== Residential towers ===
- Brickell Ten
- 500 Brickell
- Brickell House
- Echo Brickell
- Asia
- Jade at Brickell Bay
- Emerald at Brickell
- Costa Bella
- The Courts
- The Mark on Brickell
- The Four Ambassadors
- Santa Maria
- Plaza on Brickell
- Axis at Brickell Village
- The Fortune House Hotel - Hotel and condos
- Four Seasons - Hotel and condos
- Skyline
- Brickell Mar
- Brickell Place Phase I
- Brickell Place Phase II
- Brickell View West
- Brickell on the River
- Avenue on Brickell
- Latitude on the River
- The Palace
- Atlantis Condominium
- Solitair Brickell
- Panorama Tower
- Brickell City Centre
- One Broadway
- One Tequesta Point
- Carbonell Condominium
- The Club at Brickell Bay
- Infinity at Brickell
- Icon Brickell North Tower

1450 Brickell

- The Sail
- Neo Vertika
- Tequesta Point
- Villa Regina
- Vue at Brickell
- The Yacht Club
- Brickell Heights
- SLS Lux
- 1100 Millecento
- 1060 Brickell (previously Avenue on Brickell East Tower)
- 1050 Brickell (previously Avenue on Brickell West Tower)
- The Bond on Brickell

== Parks ==
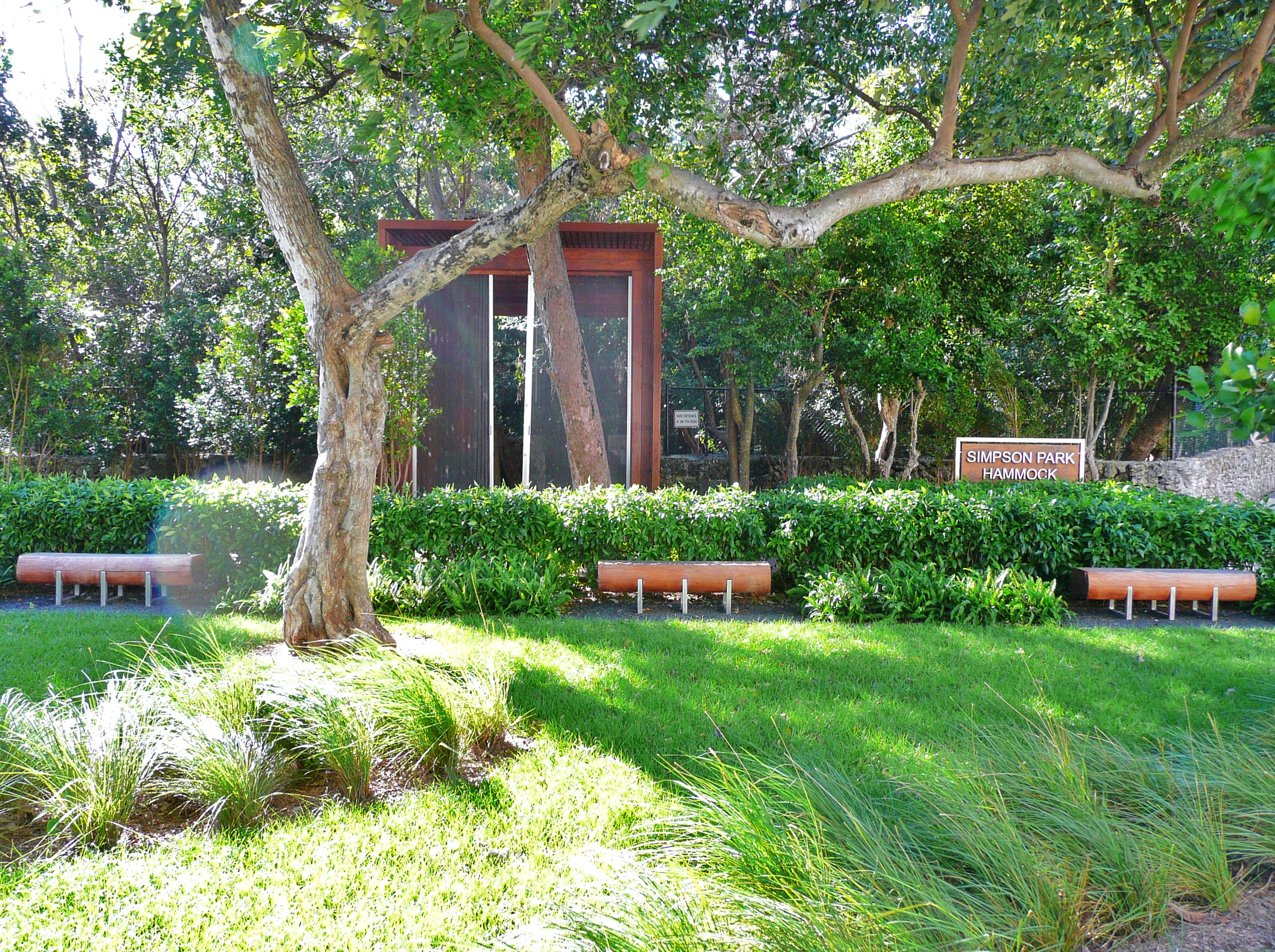
Simpson Park Hammock in Brickell

- Alice Wainwright Park- (nature preserve) Brickell Ave and the Rickenbacker Causeway
- Allen Morris Brickell Park- SE 10th St and SE 1st Ave
- Brickell Park- Brickell Ave and SE 5th St
- Marti Park- SW 3rd Ave and SW 6th Street (next to forthcoming Brickell River District)
- Miami Circle- Brickell Avenue Bridge (next to Icon Brickell towers)
- Simpson Park Hammock- (nature preserve) S. Miami Ave and Broadway
- Southside Park- SW 1st Ave and SW 11th St
- Brickell Key Park- 805 Claughton Island Dr (Private temporary park, soon to be redeveloped into residences and hotel)

== Gallery ==
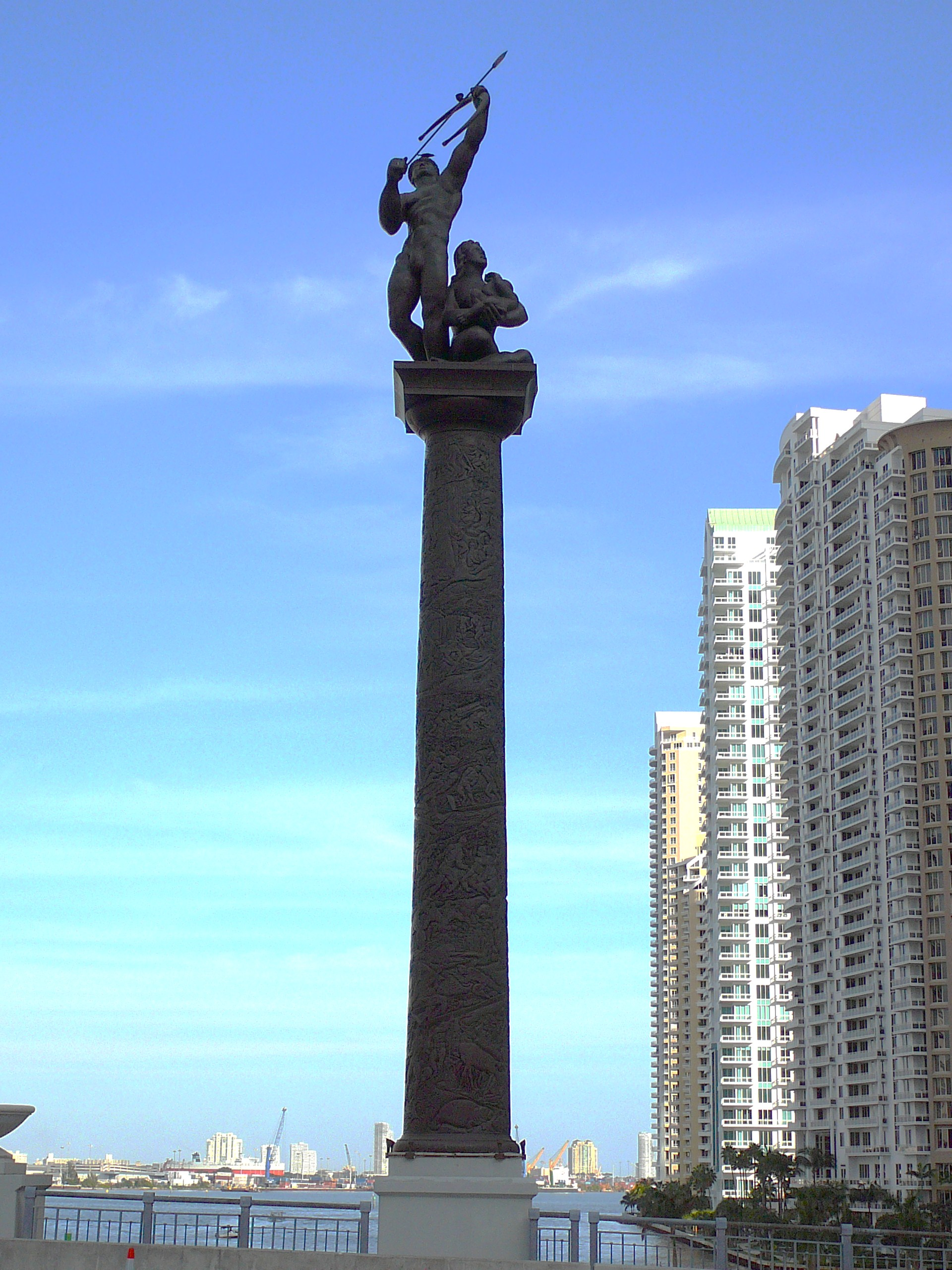
American Indian monument on bridge over the Miami River connecting Brickell with Downtown

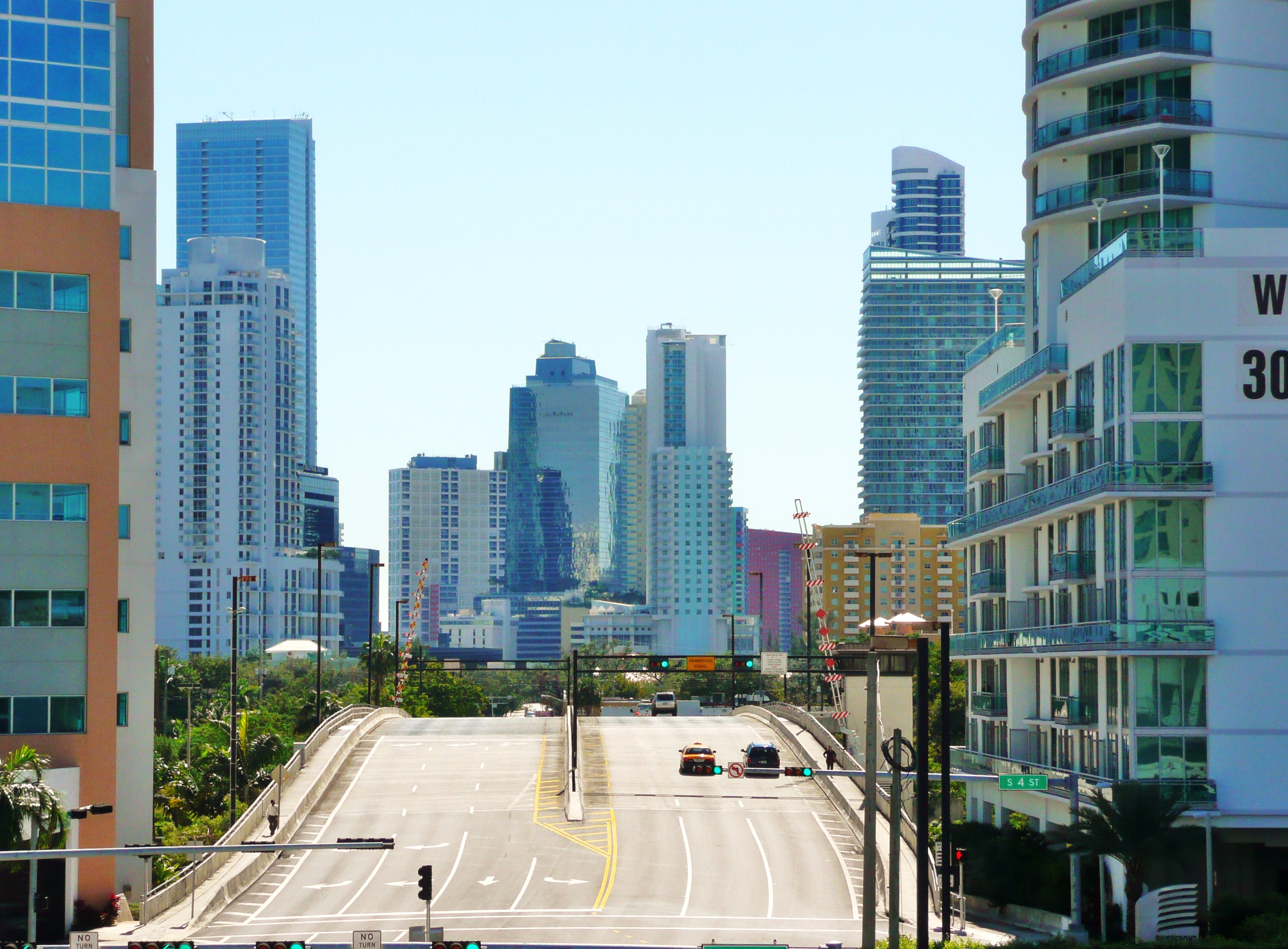
Miami Avenue

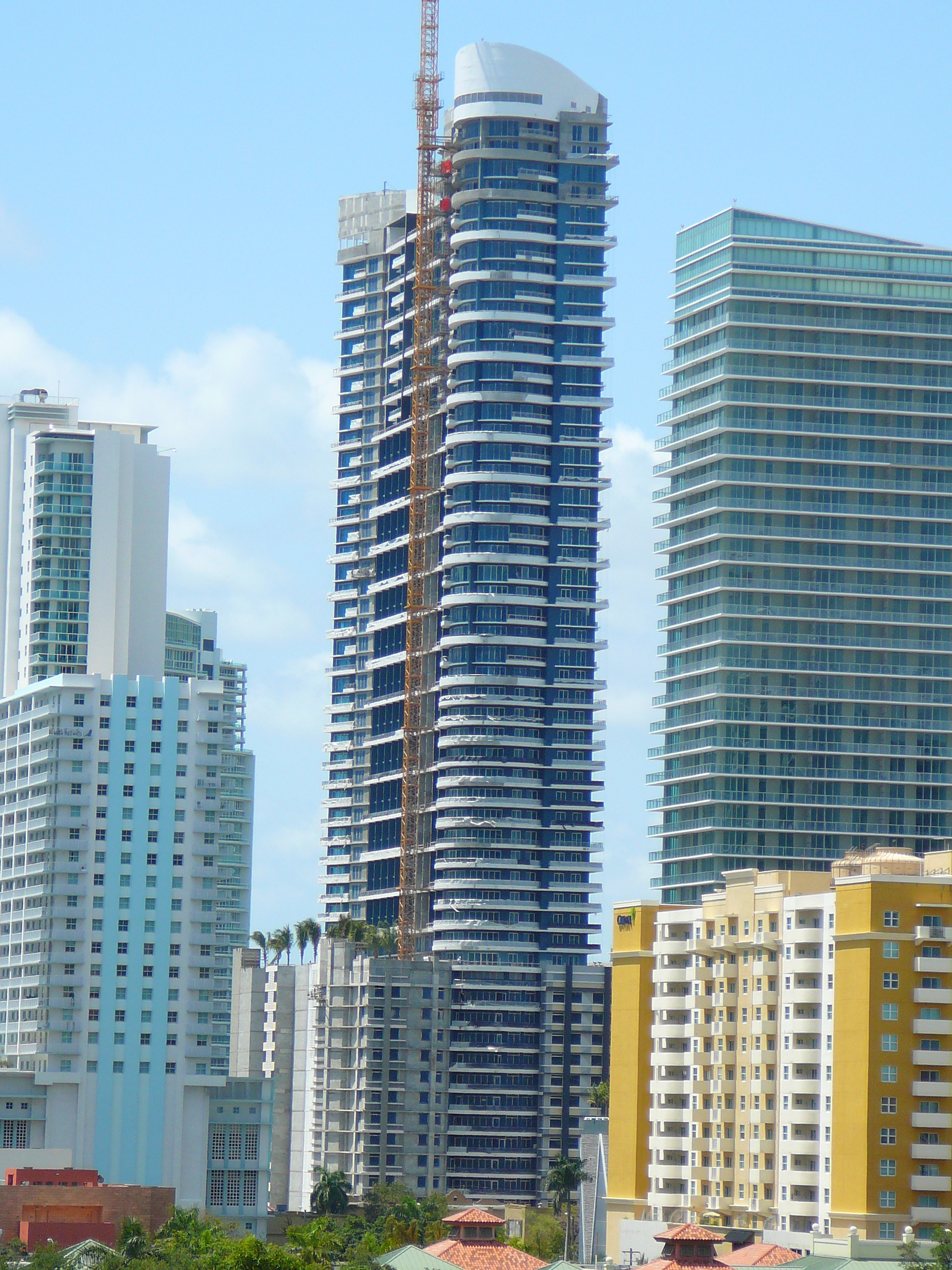
View of Brickell

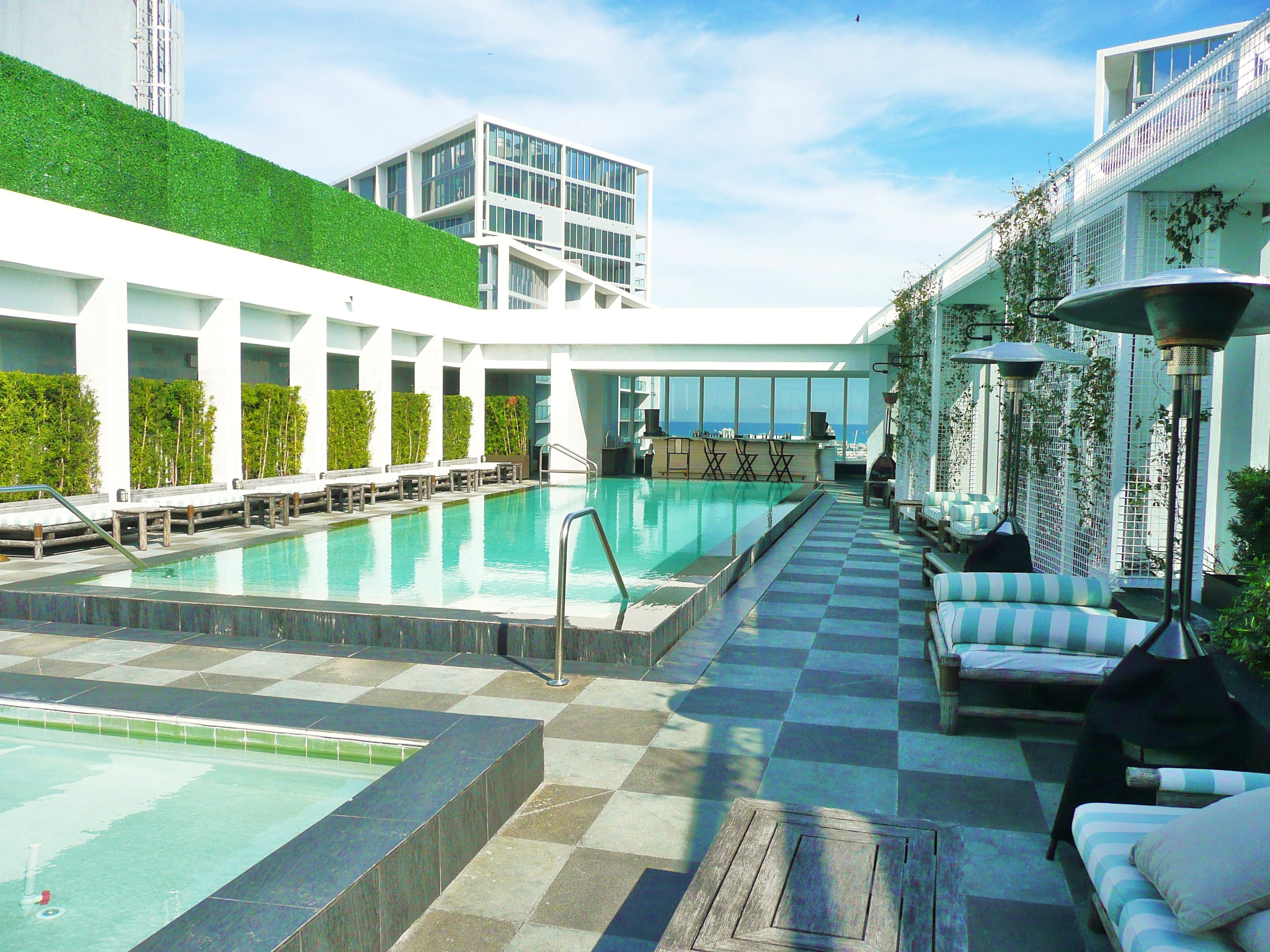
Club 50 on the 50th floor of Viceroy in Brickell

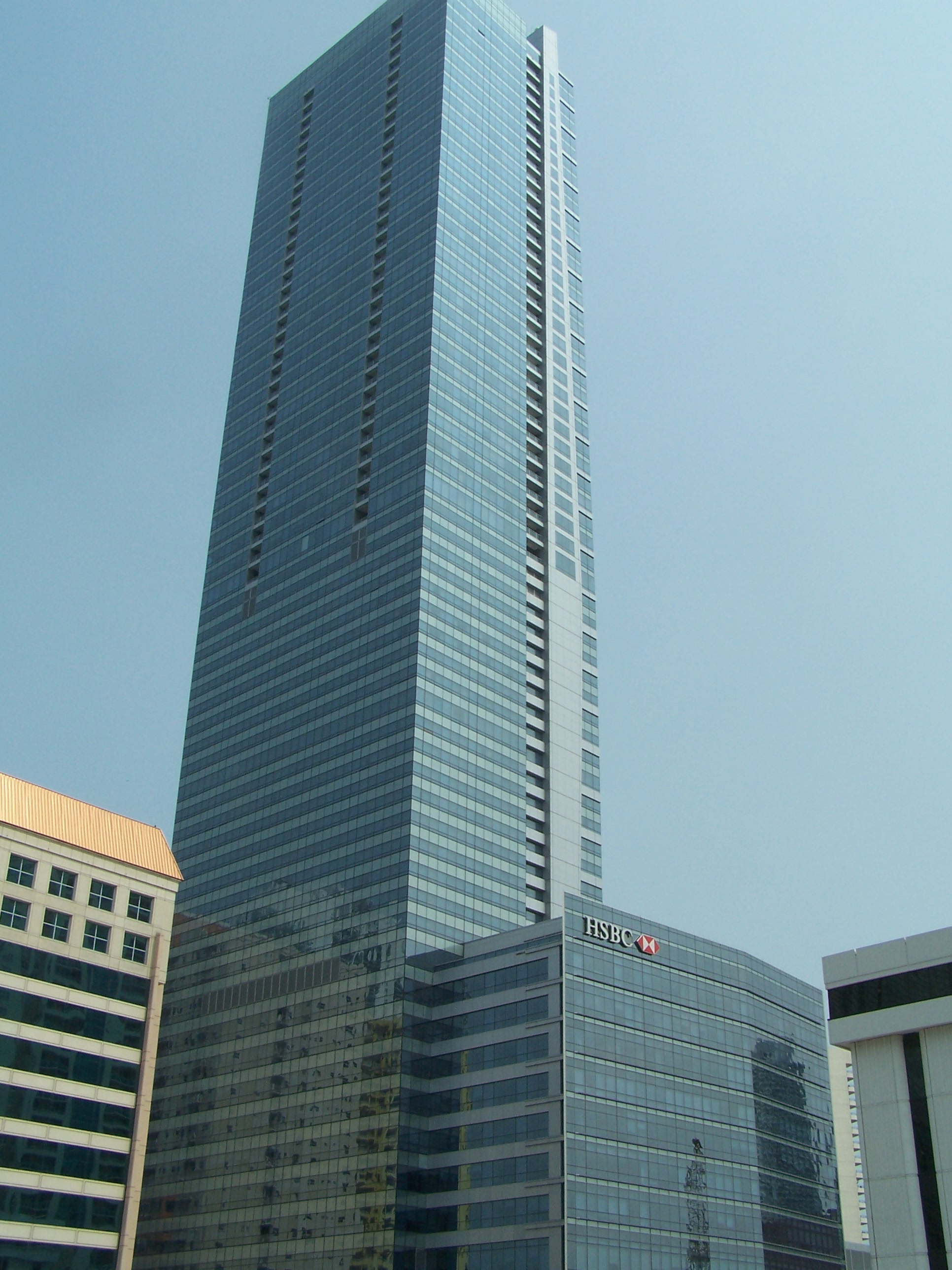
Four Seasons Hotel Miami

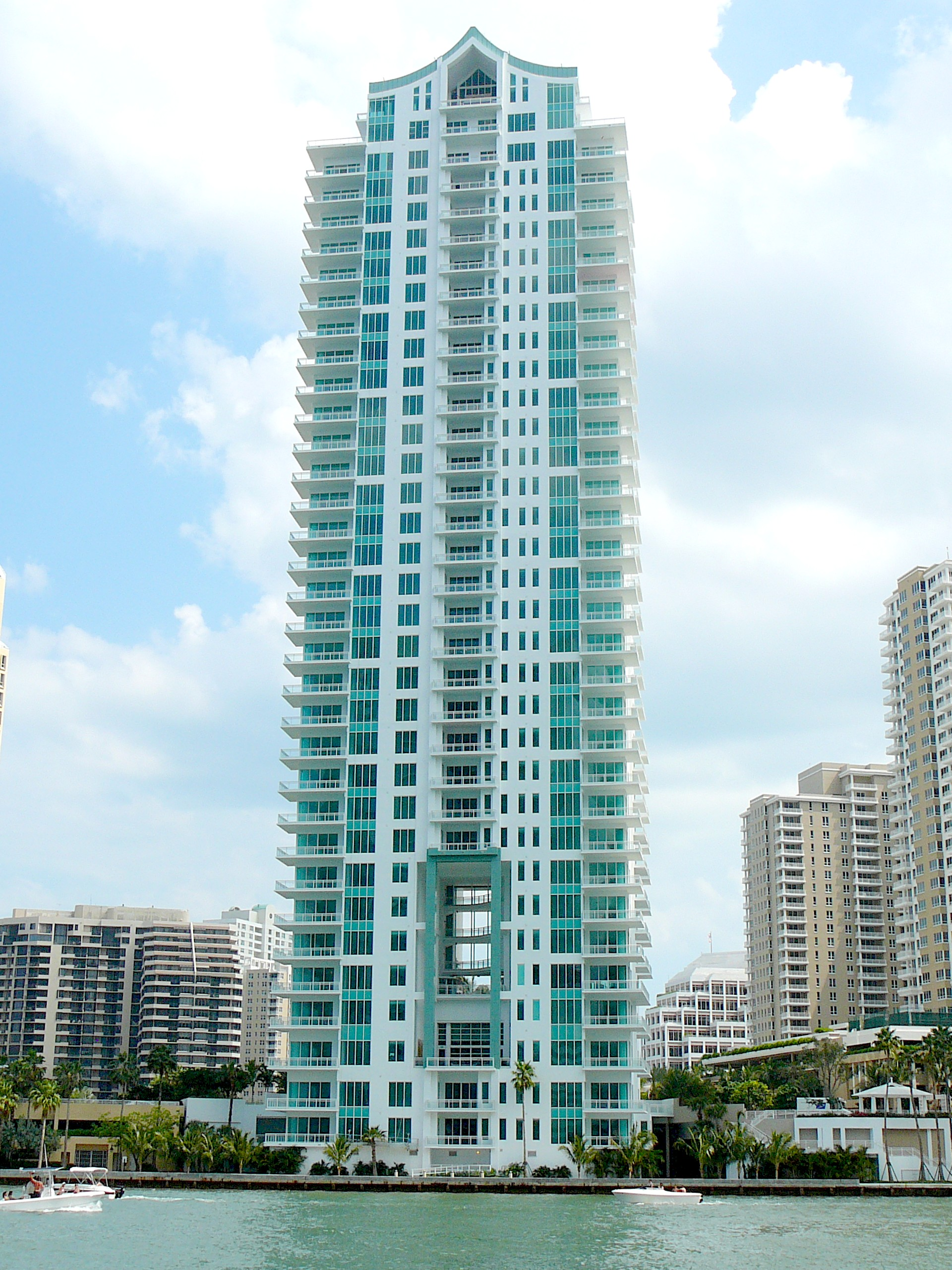
Asia on Brickell Key

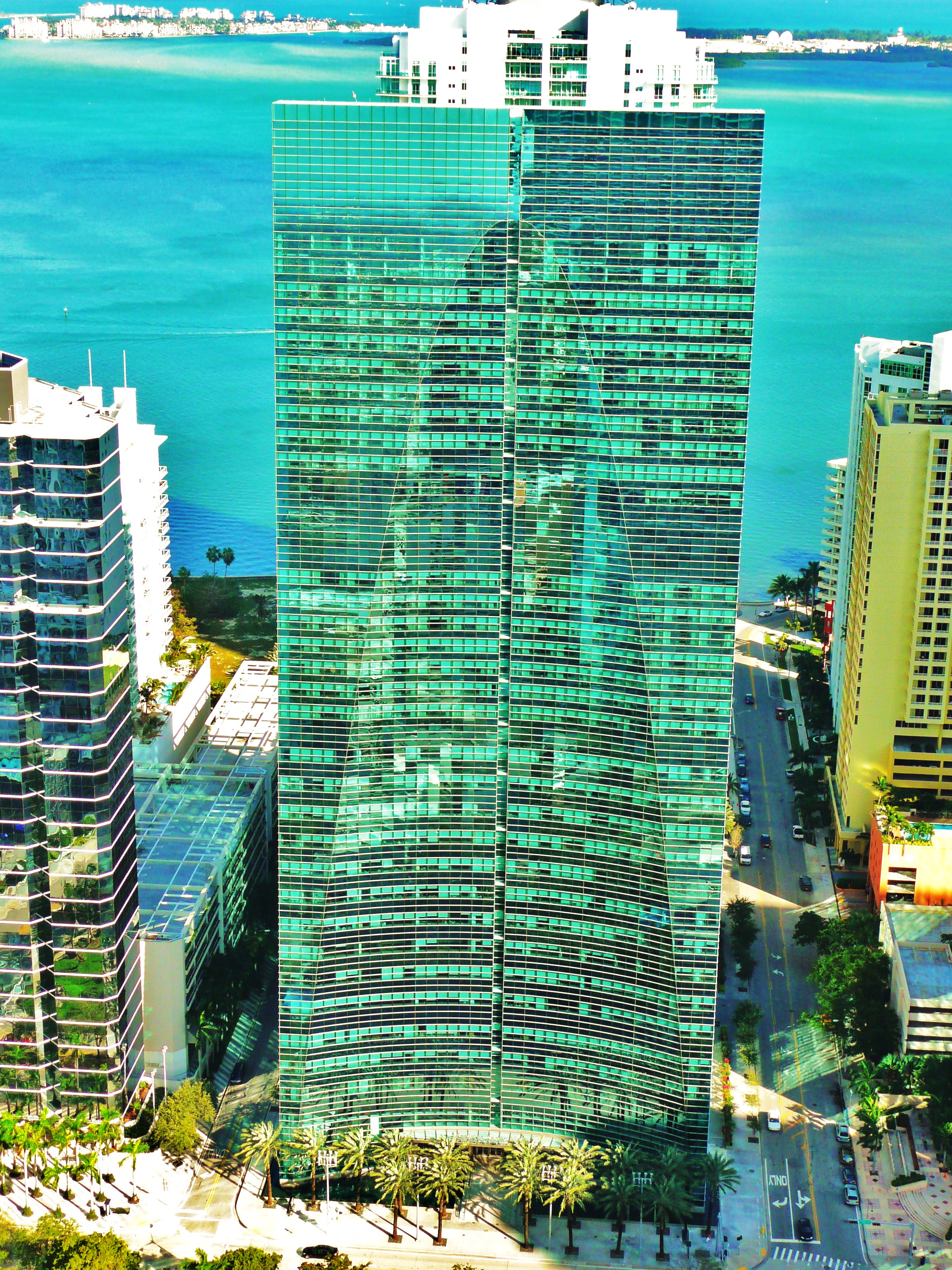
Brickell Arch

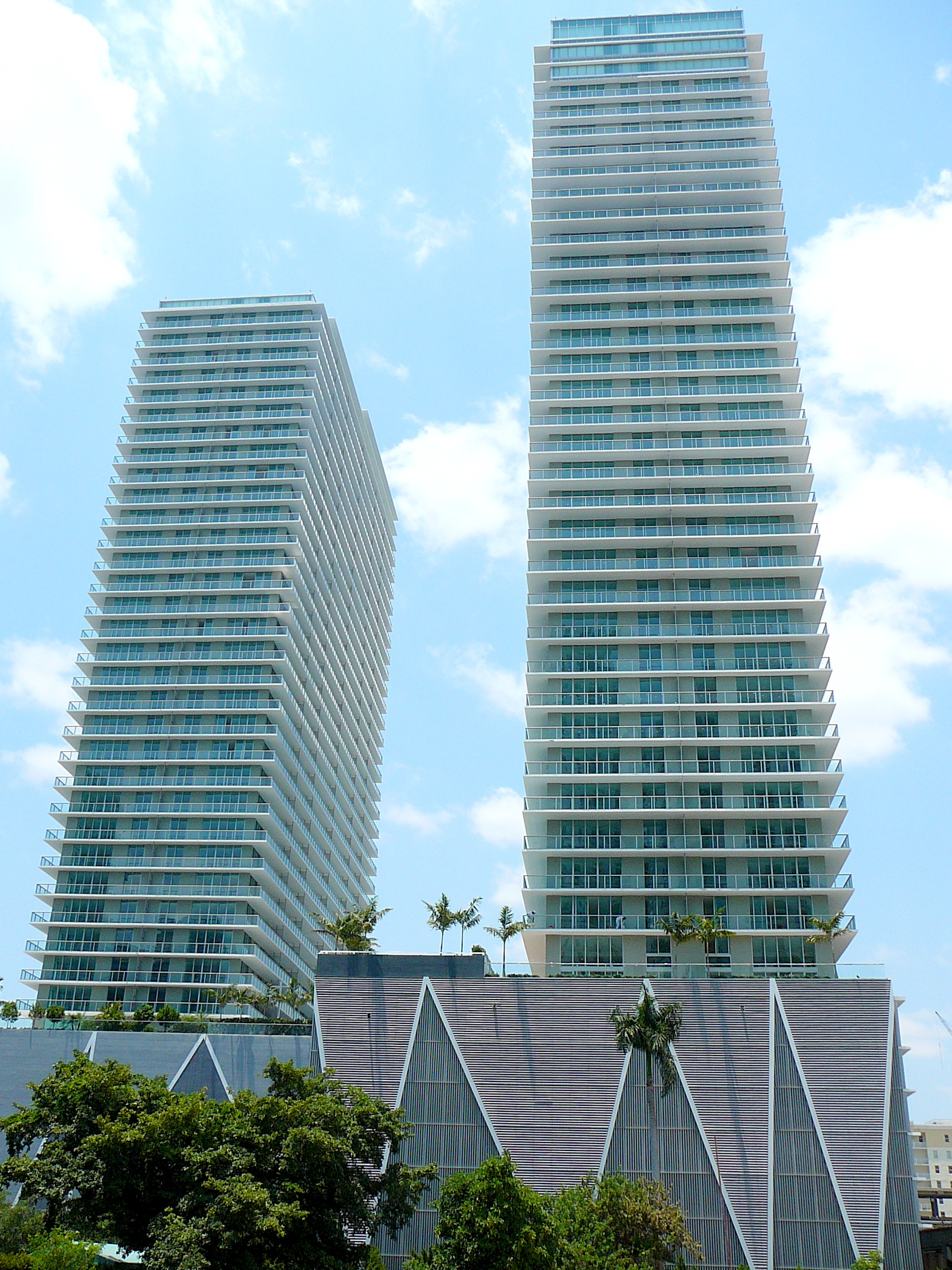
Axis at Brickell Village

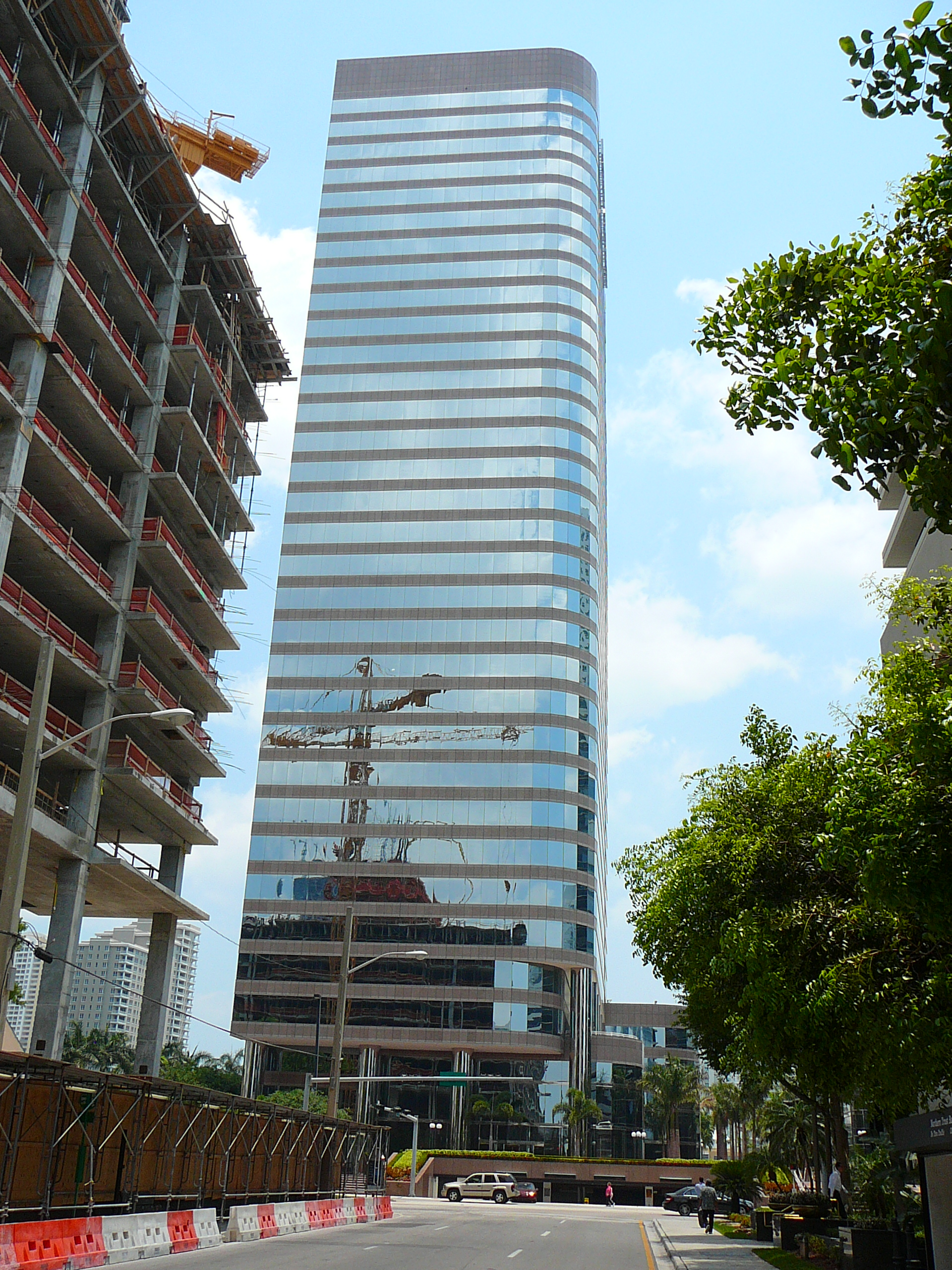
701 Brickell Avenue

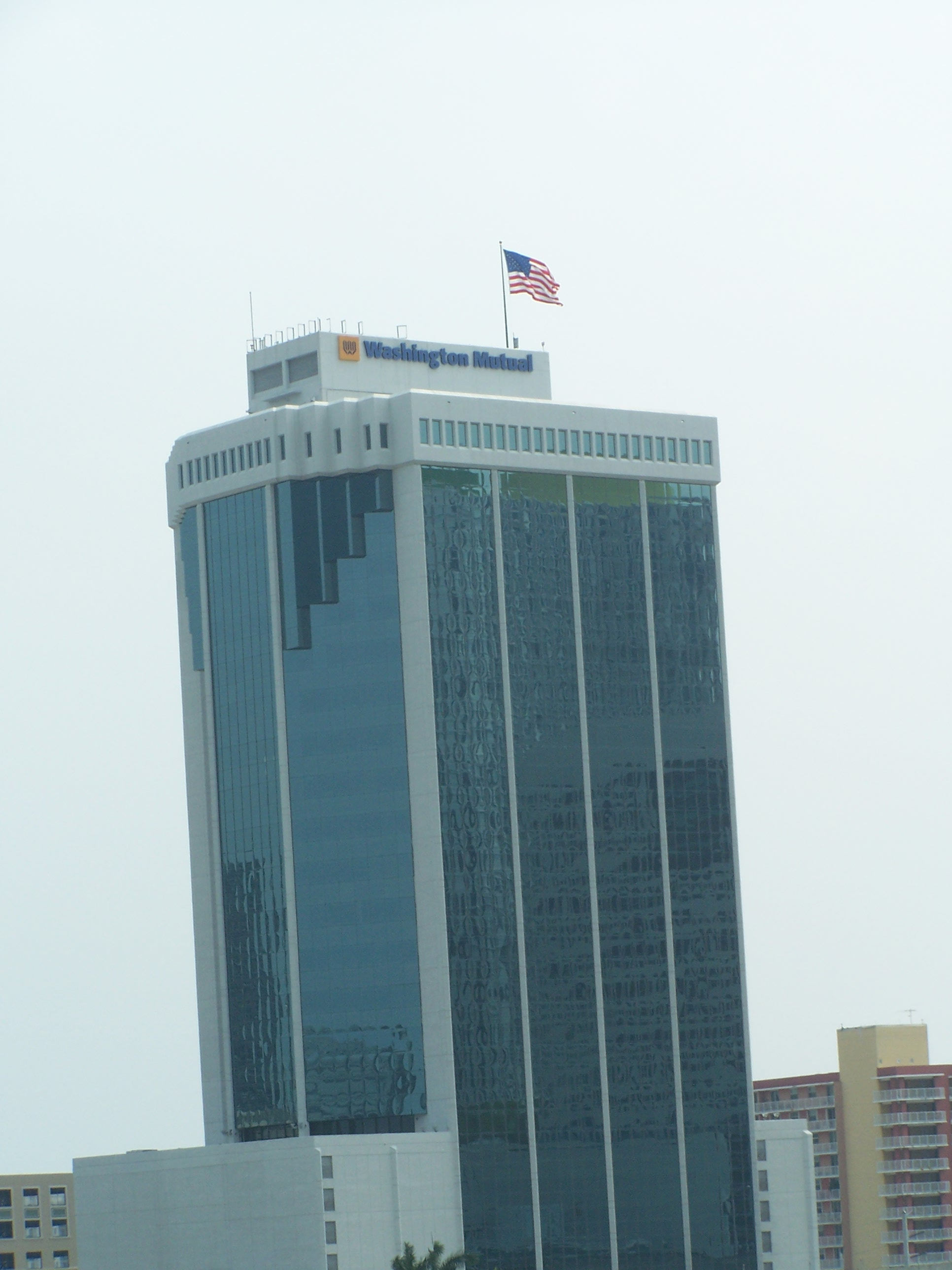
Brickell City Tower

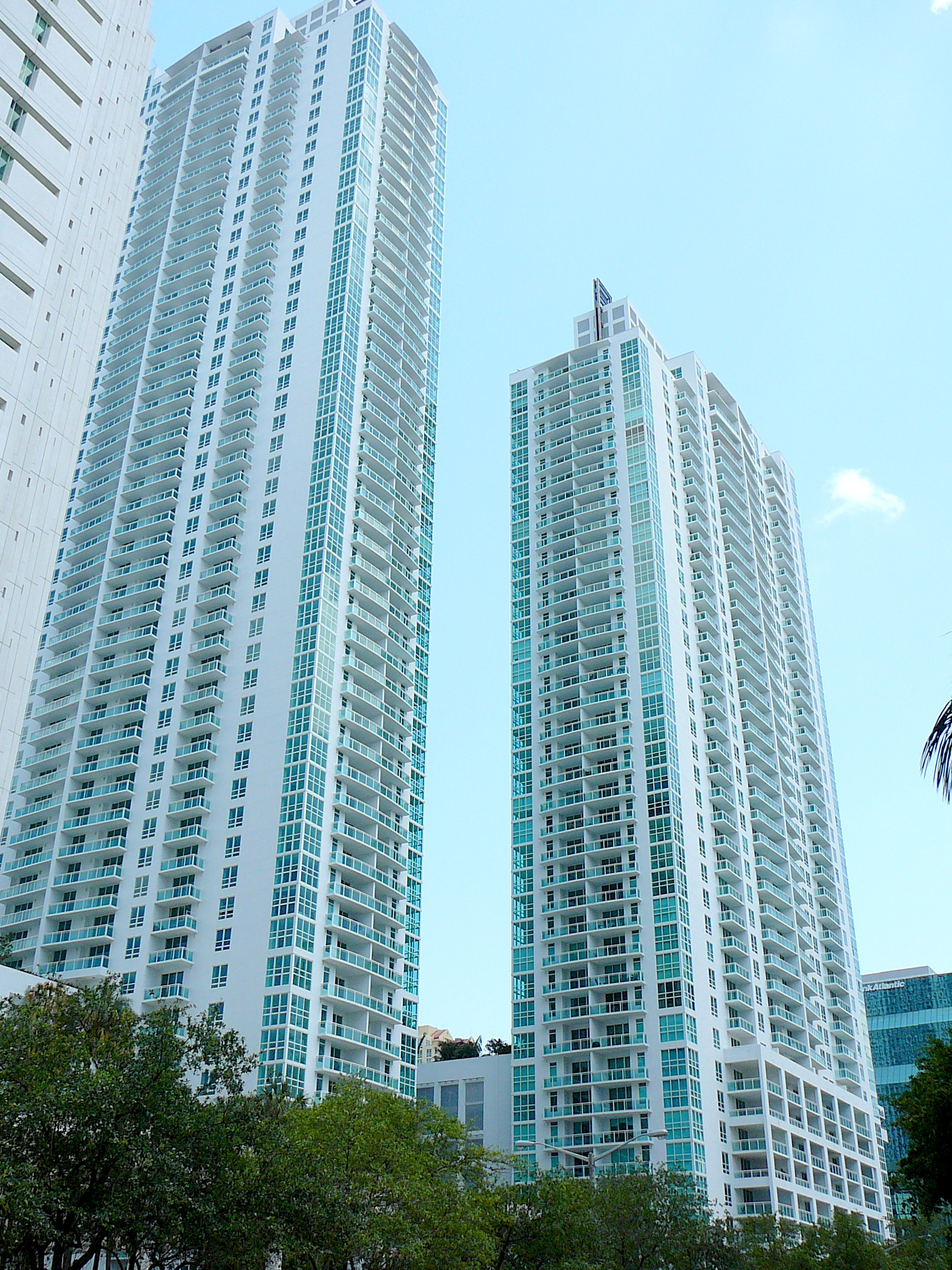
Plaza on Brickell towers

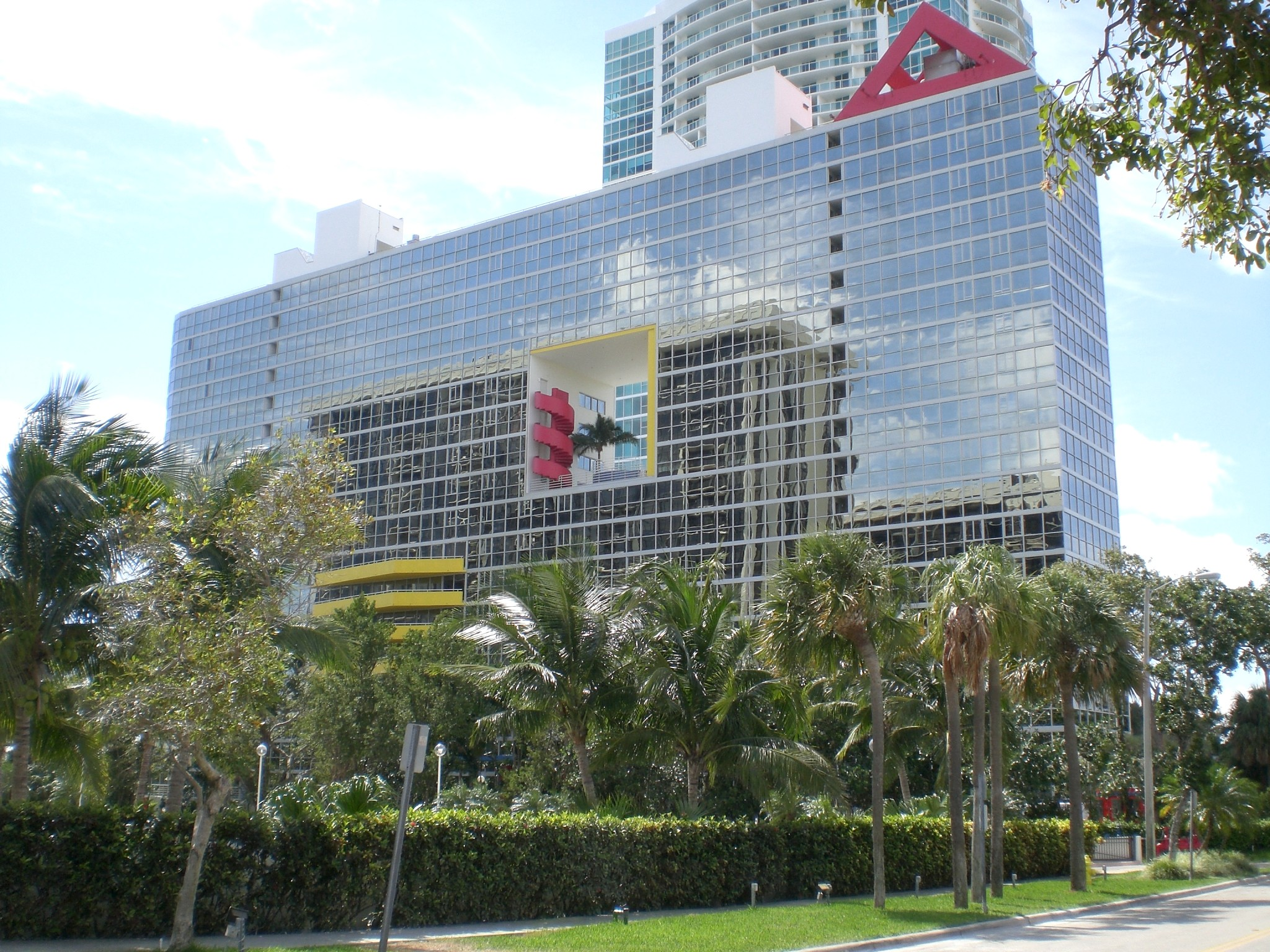
Atlantis Condominium

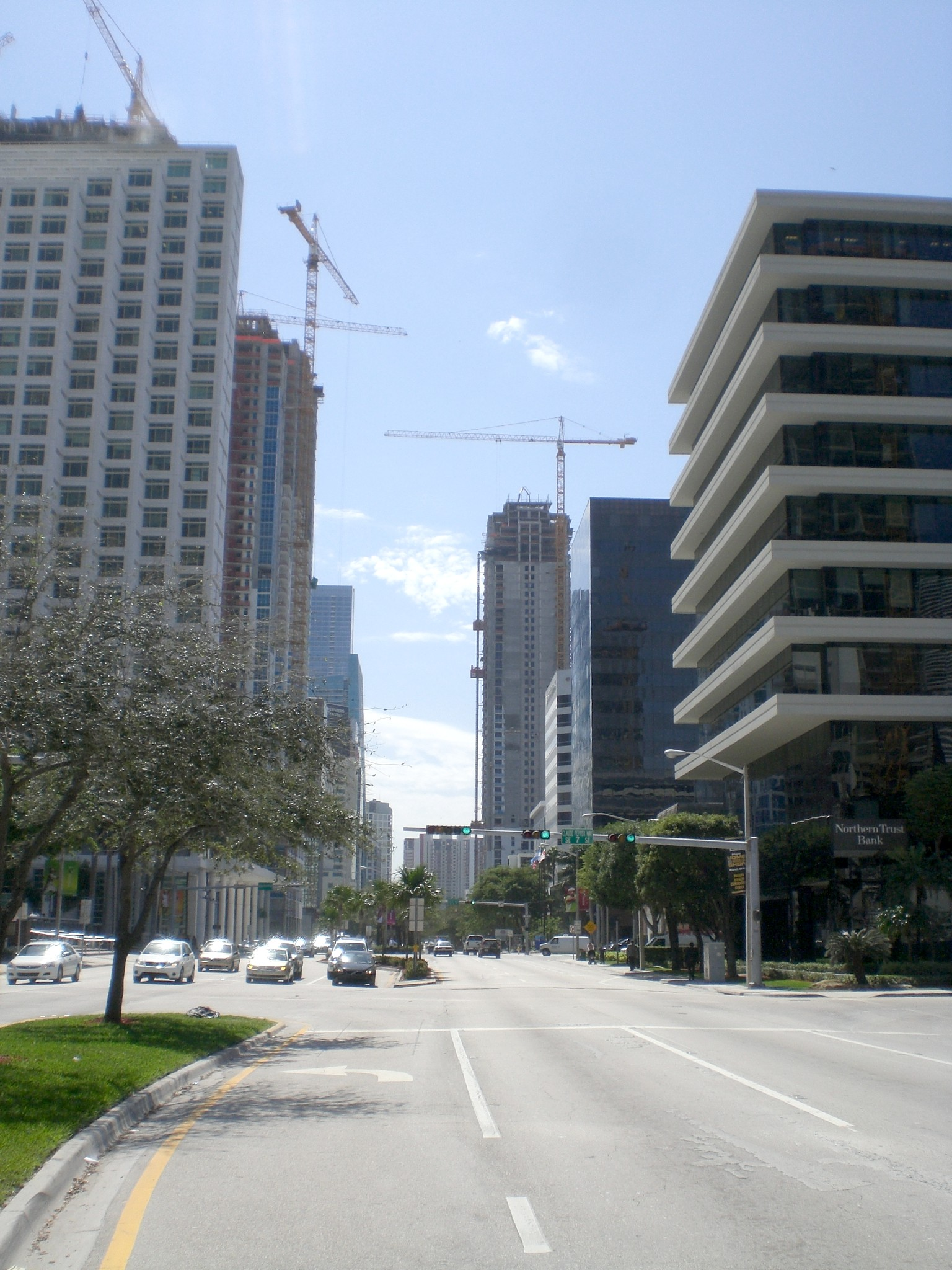
Brickell Avenue

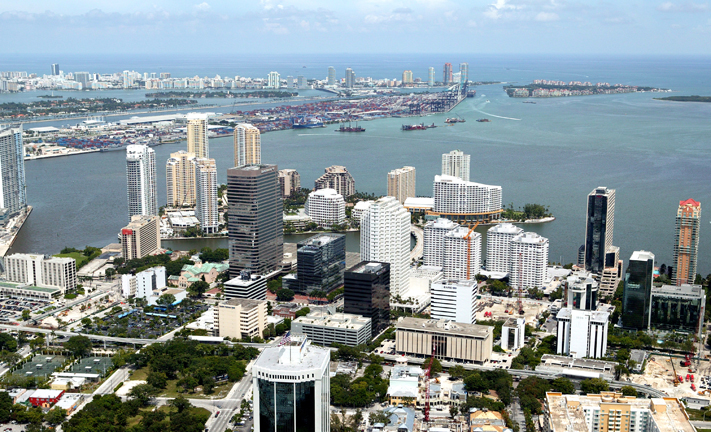
Early phase Brickell Key and Brickell skyscrapers.

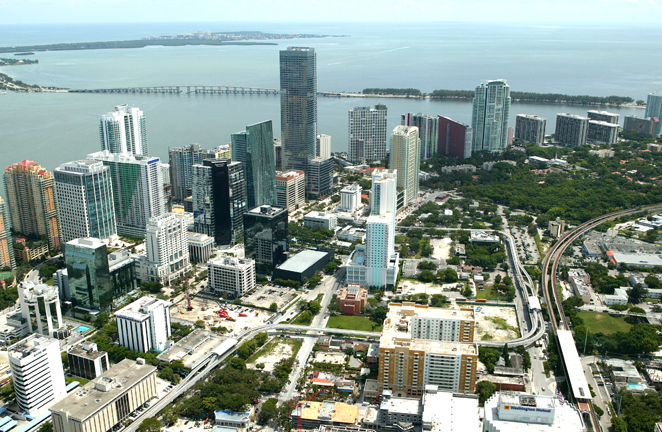
Early phase Brickell skyscrapers.

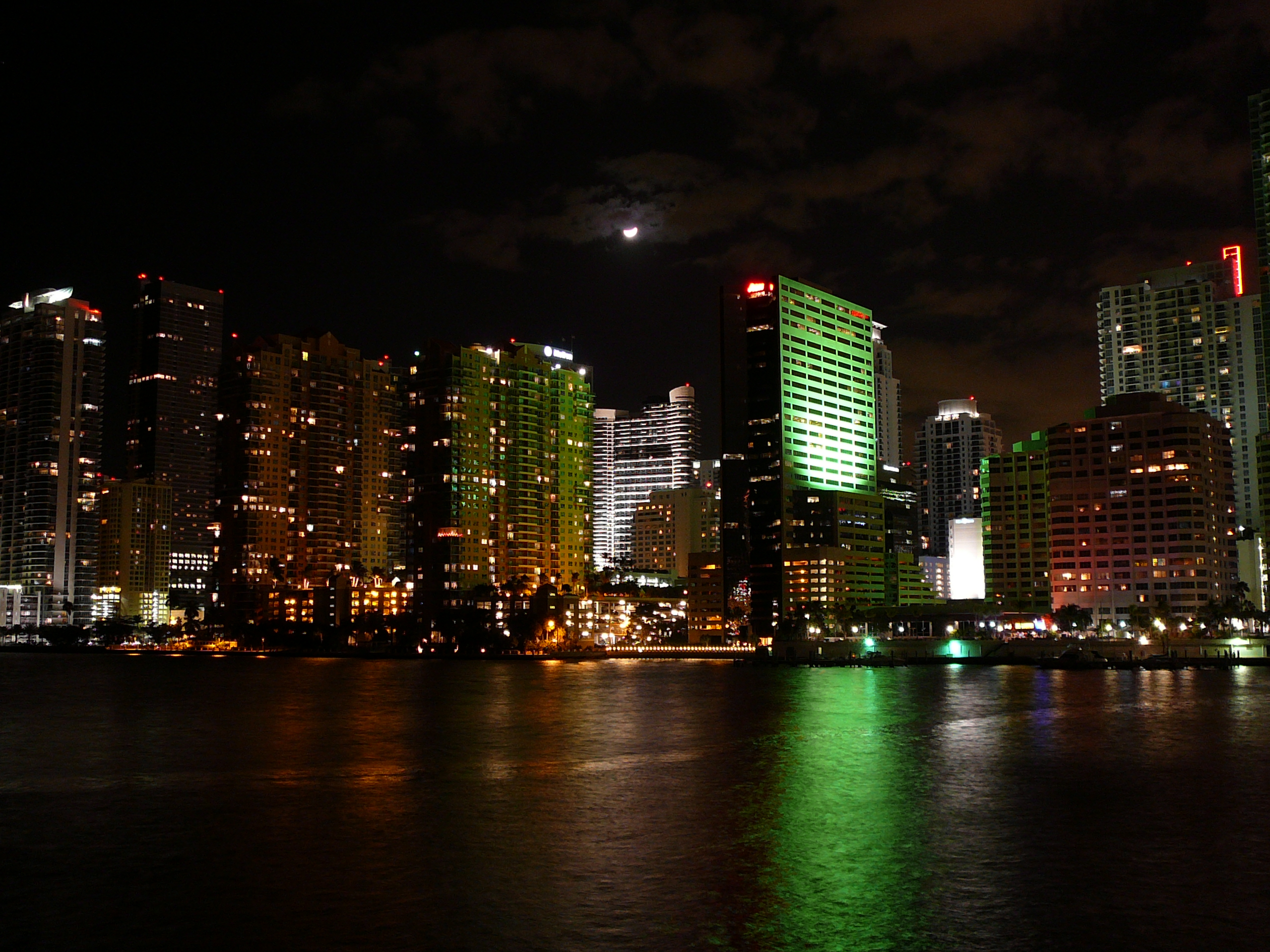
The northern Brickell skyline at night as seen from the Mandarin Oriental on Brickell Key

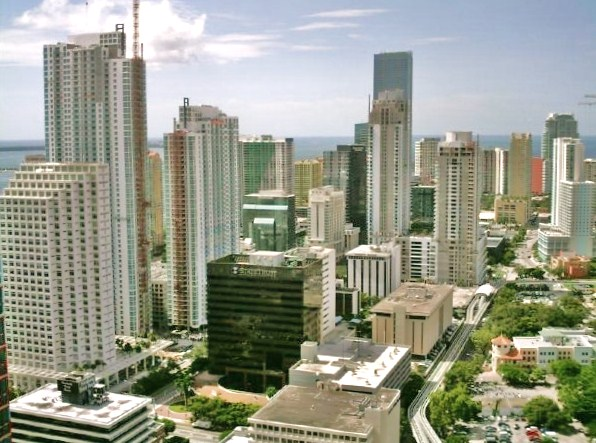
Brickell skyscrapers under construction in 2006

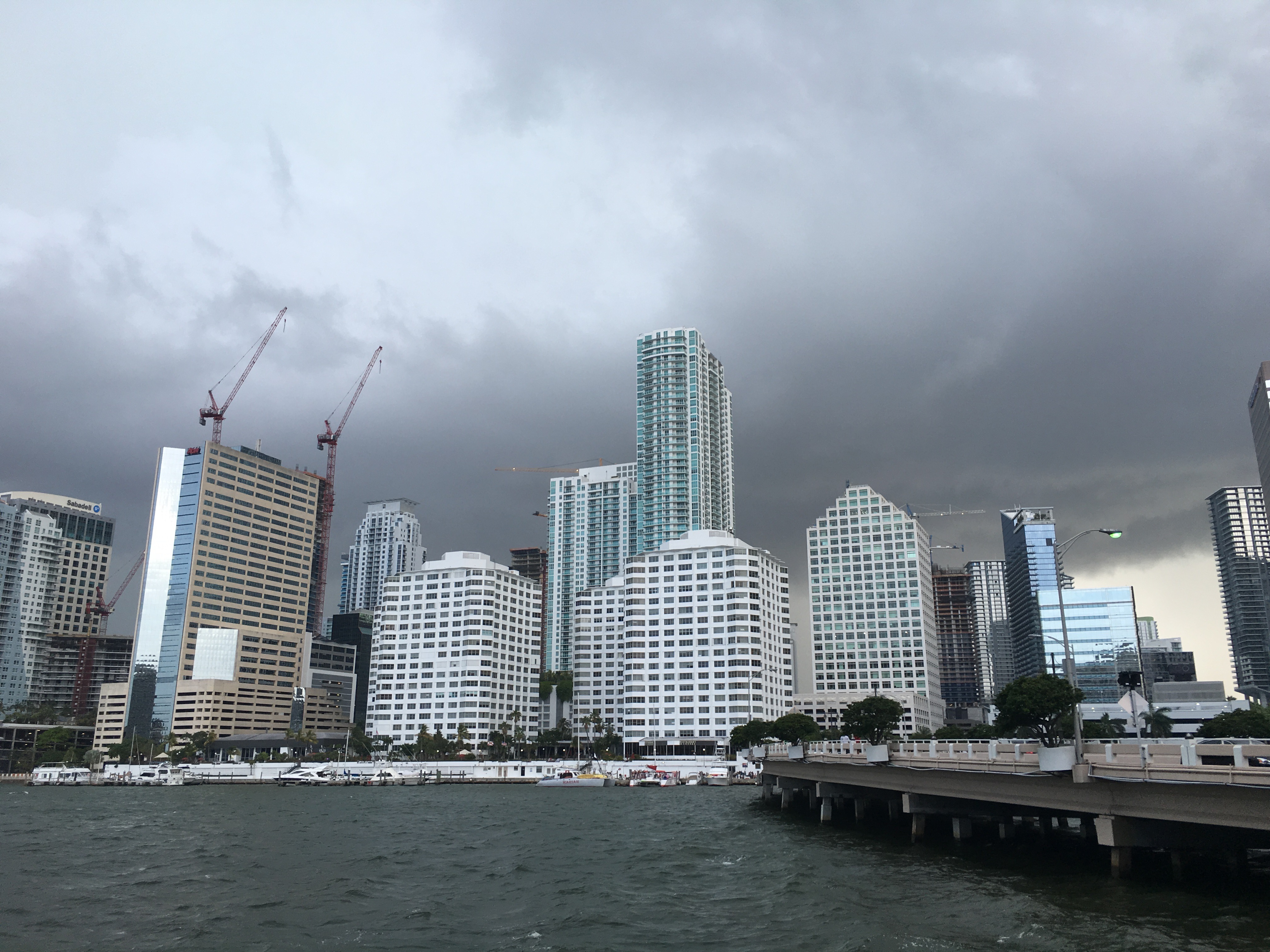
Cloudy day in Brickell, Summer of 2016.
