= Dr. James M. Jackson Office =

- U.S. National Register of Historic Places
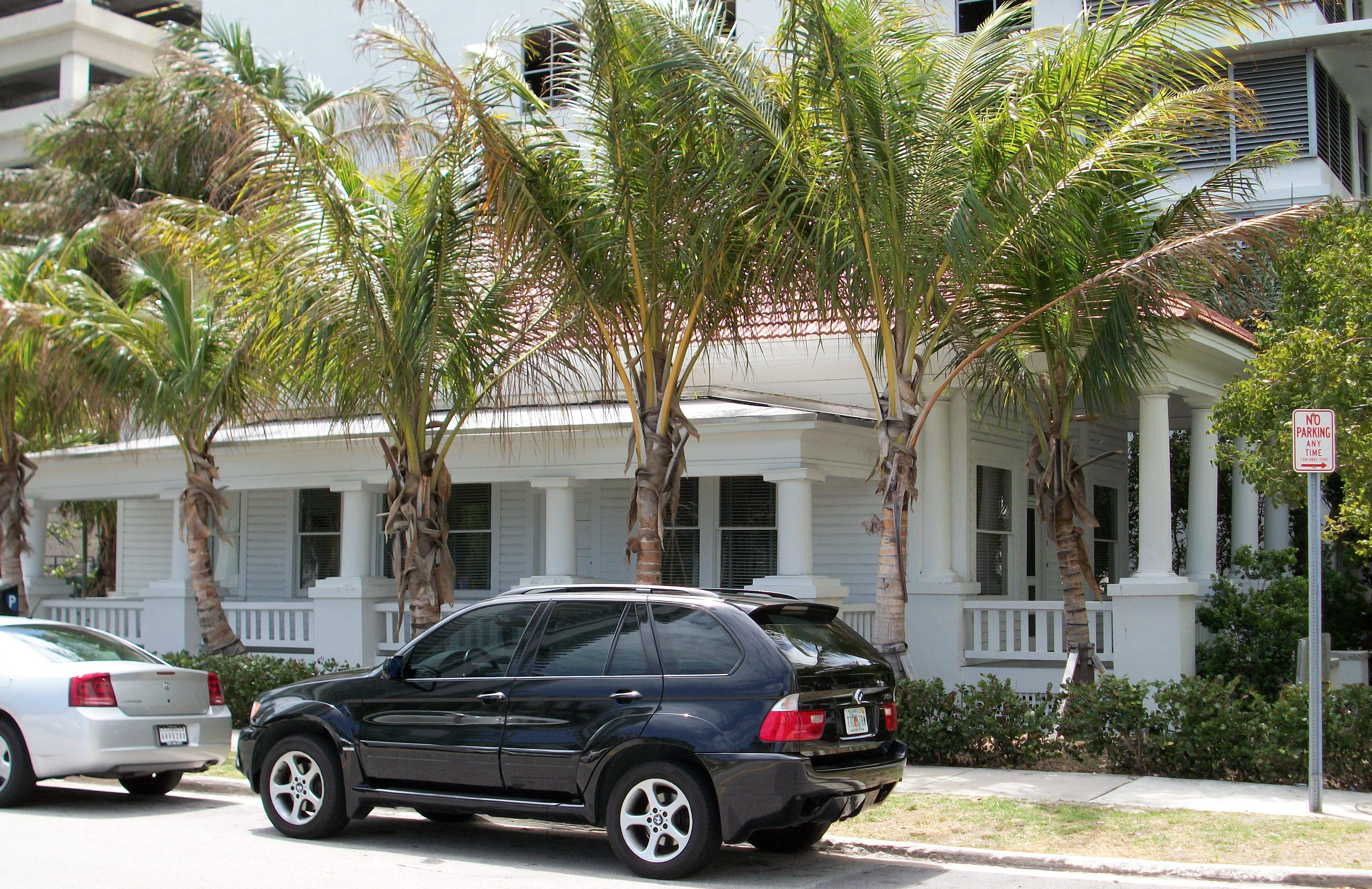

- Location within Miami Location within Florida Location within the United States
- Location: Miami, Florida
- Coordinates: 25°45′40.9104″N 80°11′23.5386″W
- NRHP reference No.: 75000550
- Added to NRHP: February 24, 1975

The Dr. James Madison Jackson Office is a historic site in Miami, Florida. It is located at 190 Southeast 12th Terrace. The first resident physician of Miami, Dr. James M. Jackson, had his office and surgery in this building. More recently, it became the offices of the Dade Heritage Trust. On February 24, 1975, the structure was added to the U.S. National Register of Historic Places. The building is located in the center of Brickell, near Downtown Miami. A great nephew, James Madison Barco, is named for Dr. Jackson.
