= Fire Station No. 4 (Miami, Florida) =

- U.S. National Register of Historic Places
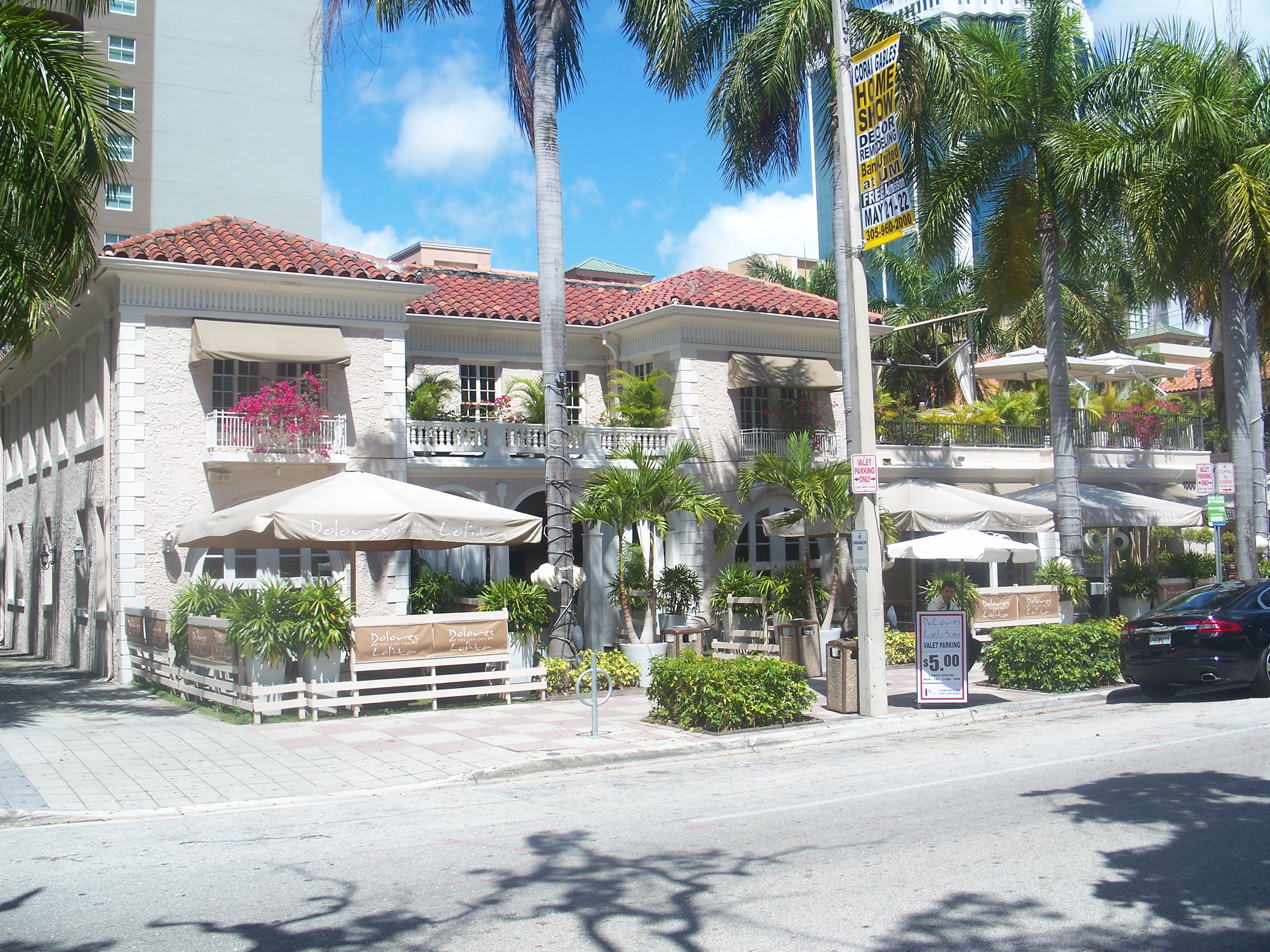

- Location within Miami Location within Florida Location within the United States
- Location: Miami, Florida
- Coordinates: 25°45′51″N 80°11′36″W
- Built: 1900
- NRHP reference No.: 84000836
- Added to NRHP: March 8, 1984

The Fire Station No. 4 is a historic fire station in Miami, Florida. It is located at 1000 South Miami Avenue. On March 8, 1984, it was added to the U.S. National Register of Historic Places.

In October 2007, it became the home of the restaurant "Dolores but you can call me Lolita".
