= Carbonell (surname) =

Carbonell is a surname of Catalan origin. Known individuals with the Carbonell last name include:

- Ángela Carbonell (born 1956), Cuban high jumper
- Alberto Carbonell (born 1993), Valencian football defender
- Álex Carbonell (born 1997), Spanish football midfielder
- Alfredo Carbonell Debali (1899–?), Uruguayan lawyer and diplomat
- Antonio Carbonell (born 1969), Spanish singer-songwriter
- Agustín Carbonell (born 1967), Spanish guitarist and composer of flamenco music
- Carmen Carbonell (1900–1988), Spanish stage and film actress
- Charles-Olivier Carbonell (1930–2013), French historian
- Daniel Carbonell, Cuban baseball player
- Eudald Carbonell (born 1953), Catalan archaeologist, anthropologist and paleontologist
- Felipe Martinez Carbonell (born 1990), Argentine film director and screenwriter
- Francinaina Cirer Carbonell (1781–1855), Spanish Roman Catholic venerated Christian
- Guidette Carbonell (1910–2008), French artist
- Isaac Carbonell (born 1994), Catalan racing cyclist
- Isabelle Carbonell, American documentary photographer and filmmaker
- Jaime Carbonell (1953–2020), Uruguayan-born computer scientist at Carnegie Mellon University
- Joaquín Carbonell (1947–2020), Spanish singer-songwriter and journalist
- Jordi Carbonell (1924–2016), Spanish politician
- Josefina Carbonell, official of the U.S. Department of Health and Human Services
- Josep Carbonell (born 1957), Spanish sprinter
- Juan Carlos Carbonell (born 1970), Chilean open wheel race-car driver
- Lorenzo Carbonell Santacruz (1883–1968), mayor of Alicante, Spain
- Loreto Carbonell (1933–2017), Filipino basketball player
- Luis Carbonell Parra (1924–2015), Venezuelan scientist.
- Manuel Carbonell (1918–2011), Cuban sculptor
  - Carbonell Awards in South Florida
- María Gómez Carbonell (1903–1988), Cuban educator and attorney
- Miguel Ángel Carbonell (born 1972), Argentine football player
- Miquel Carbonell Selva (1854–1896), Catalan painter, muralist and poet
- Nestor Carbonell (born 1967), American actor
- Ona Carbonell (born 1990), Catalan synchronized swimmer
- Pere Miquel Carbonell (1434–1517), Catalan historian, humanist, notary, calligrapher, poet and writer
- Peris Carbonell (born 1957), Valencian painter and sculptor
- Ponç Carbonell (died c. 1320), Catalan Franciscan scholar
- Rafael Carbonell (born 1943), Cuban boxer
- Raulito Carbonell, Puerto Rican actor, comedian, singer and lawyer
- Teresa Gisbert Carbonell (1926–2018), Bolivian art historian and architect
- Tomás Carbonell (1621–1692), Spanish friar of the Dominican Order
- Tomás Carbonell (born 1968), Catalan tennis player

== See also ==
- Carbonnelle
