= Carbonnelle =

Carbonnelle is a surname. Notable people with the surname include:

- André Carbonnelle (1923–2015), Belgian field hockey player
- Eddy Carbonnelle (1926–2004), Belgian field hockey player
- Ignatius Carbonnelle (1829–1889), Belgian Jesuit and mathematician

== See also ==
- Carbonell (surname)
