= Carbonell =

Carbonell may refer to:

- Carbonell (surname)
- Carbonell Awards annually given to theaters in South Florida
- Carbonell Condominium, a residential high-rise building near Miami, Florida, U.S.
- Ashford Carbonell, a village in Shropshire, England
