= Tequesta (disambiguation) =

Tequesta is the name of a tribe in Florida at the time of first European contact. It may also refer to:

- Tequesta, Florida, a municipality in Palm Beach County
- Tequesta Point, a complex of residential high-rises in Miami, Florida
- Tequesta Trace Middle School, in Broward County, Florida
- Tequesta, the journal of HistoryMiami (formerly the Historical Society of Southern Florida)
