= Slow violence =

Violence which occurs gradually and is not necessarily visible

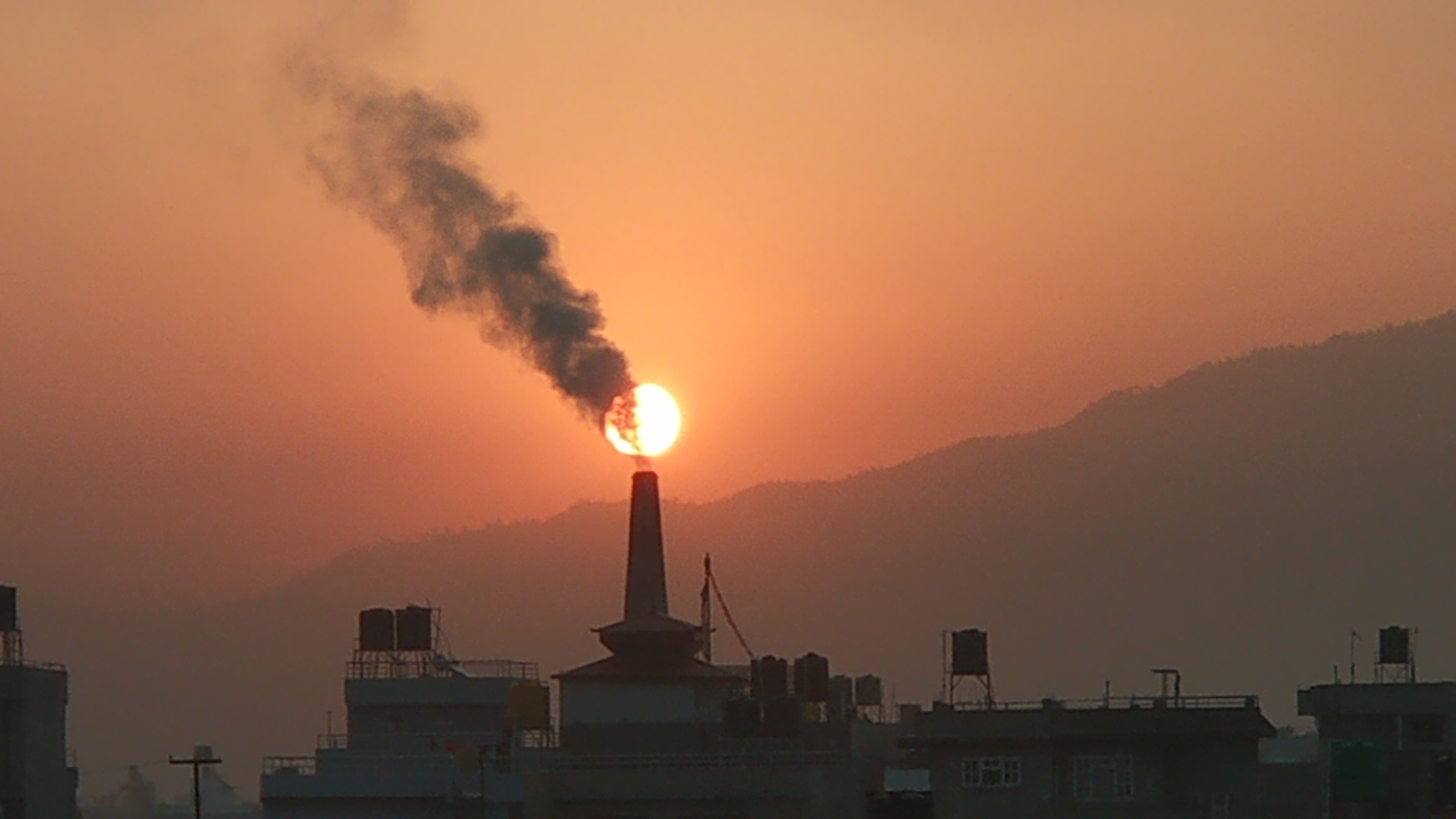
Atmospheric pollution is a type of slow violence

Slow violence is violence which occurs gradually and is not necessarily visible. Slow violence is incremental and is dynamic across time, in contrast with a conception of general violence as an event or action that is immediate, explosive and spectacular. Outcomes of slow violence include environmental degradation, long-term pollution and climate change. Slow violence is also closely linked to many instances of environmental racism.

The origins of the concept of slow violence can be traced back to the 1960s with the introduction of the idea of structural violence. In 1969, Johan Galtung conceived of structural violence. Some views include that structural violence and slow violence are closely linked, as structural inequality can morph into forms of slow violence. However, slow violence is thought to be different from structural violence, as slow violence occurs over a period of many years or generations.

The term slow violence itself was coined by Rob Nixon in his 2011 book Slow Violence and the Environmentalism of the Poor. Nixon defines slow violence as "a violence that occurs gradually and out of sight, a violence of delayed destruction that is dispersed across time and space, an attritional violence that is typically not viewed as violence at all". Rob Nixon states that people lacking resources or people who are living in poverty are the main casualties of slow violence, as it is "built on the bedrock of social inequality". Use of the term has since transitioned to involve applications outside of environmental concerns.

In the decade following its coinage, the concept gained widespread usage for analyses of communities enduring environmental degradation. Two prominent expansions of the concept emerged stressing temporality and visibility or perceivability of slow violence. Thom Davies challenges the idea that slow violence is 'out of sight', but that instead it could be out of sight to a particular person or people. He contrasts an immobile and fixed nature of structural violence with his and Nixon's ideas of a geographically and temporally dynamic movement of slow violence over time. Davies also states that a lack of understandings of process, interactions, and effects can result in slow violence. Ahman produces work that contributes to the shared idea that both slow violence and its responses are characterized by manipulations of time. Merging the two perspectives, Shannon O'Lear approaches slow violence as indirect and latent, stating that slow violence "can result from epistemic and political dominance of particular narratives or understandings."

Slow violence has also been extensively studied in relation to political mobilization. Some scholars point to instances where accumulation of slow violence leads to widespread grassroot mobilization against its effects. Conversely, others point to cases where pollution is avoided, sidelined, and ignored faced with the seeming impossibility of its resolution. Still others show instances where slow violence actively discloses possibilities of political mobilization.

Digital slow violence is characterized by the gradual and often unnoticed adverse effects in the digital realm, such as extended online harassment and unauthorized sharing of personal information, which collectively can affect individuals' well-being over extended periods.

== Types ==
The definition and use of slow violence has evolved throughout time to include the following examples:

Armed Conflict and Its Environmental Aftermath

Slow violence can also be understood through the long-term consequences of armed conflicts. In A Landscape of War (2022), anthropologist Munira Khayyat examines how warfare and occupation in Southern Lebanon have shaped relationships between communities and their environment. Her research shows how destruction and reconstruction have become intertwined with cultural practices, especially tobacco cultivation. Her work shows how the consequences of war extend beyond military confrontations, becoming embedded in everyday life.

=== In energy ===
==== Petrochemical infrastructure ====
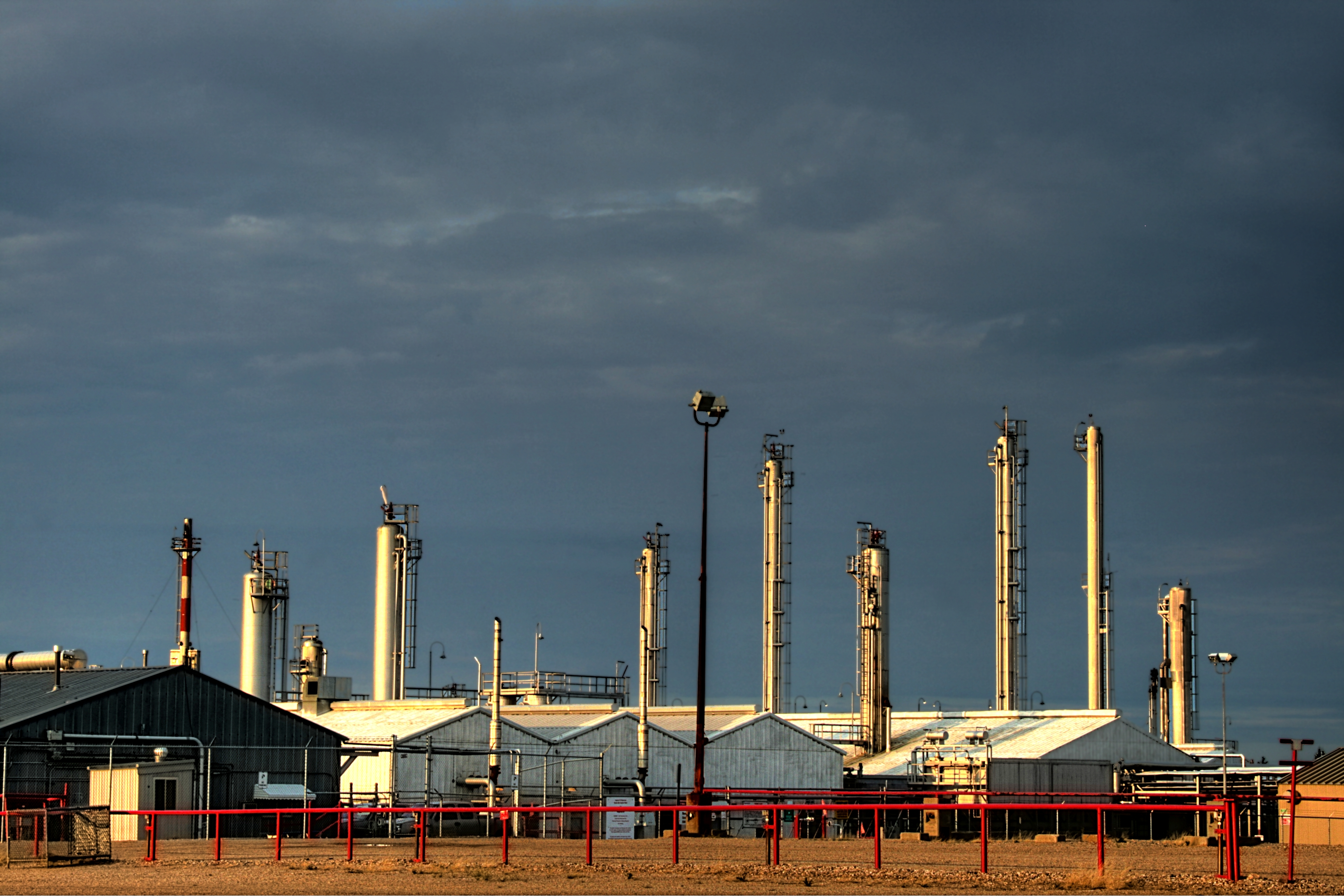
A Canadian Petrochemical plant

Communities surrounded by petrochemical infrastructure endure toxic pollution, which is defined by Thom Davies as a type of violence. However, this type of slow violence is not entirely invisible to the people they impact. People subject to slow violence gradually witness the daily impacts of that violence. Davies records instances of slow violence caused by petrochemical infrastructure in Freetown, Louisiana, where 136 petrochemical plants reside. This instance of slow violence is a form of environmental racism, as it is occurring on land with a population of 95% African Americans.

==== Fairfield Renewable Energy Project ====
In 2009, a trash incinerator called the Fairfield Renewable Energy Project was set to be constructed in Maryland's Curtis Bay neighborhood. The energy the incinerator generated from burning waste and garbage would power other neighborhoods located in Baltimore and was presented as a renewable energy source. At the time, state officials were considering reclassifying incineration as a Tier 1 renewable energy source. Curtis Bay community members, high school students, activists, and scholar Chloe Ahmann argued that the project would also build upon the preexisting slow violence the neighborhood was facing in the form of further pollution. Curtis Bay is surrounded by various forms of industry such as parts of the petrochemical, steel, fertilizer, oil, and chemical industries, as well as a medical waste incinerator and various dumps. The way the impacts of these industries and other projects have accumulated over time is an example of slow violence. As described by Ahmann, health conditions – such as gastroschisis, cancers, and fatal cases of asthma – have appeared over multiple generations, all of which are concentrated in this neighborhood. Ahmann also points out how residents’ mindsets can illustrate the impact of slow violence. Many remarked on a feeling of normalcy about these conditions – that this was how it had always been. Others expressed frustrations about the inability to concretely connect current health conditions to their former occupations or long residency in the neighborhood that exposed them to hazards or unhealthy conditions.

The Fairfield Renewable Energy Project was met with resistance and eventually stopped. It also brought attention to other acts of slow violence stemming from the industrial structure of the Curtis Bay neighborhood.

==== Jharia coalfields ====
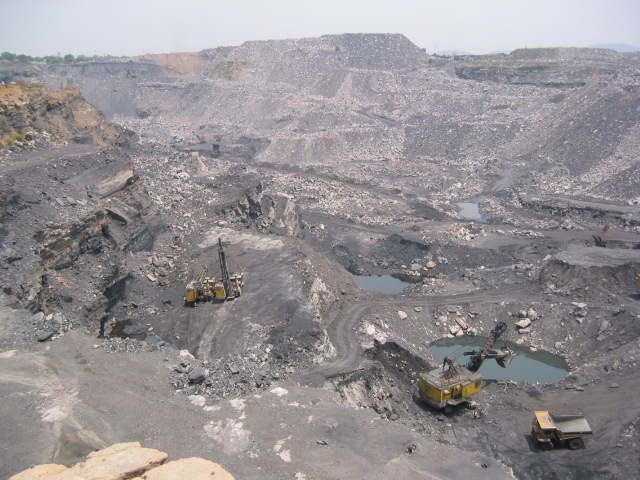
Jharia coalfields

The Jharia coalfields are the location of India's biggest and longest running coal mines. They account for a significant percentage of the country's coal production.

Coal mining is an extractive industry because it is a process that removes natural resources from nature. Extractive processes have been recognized by Nixon to create a specific type of tension that is characteristic of slow violence. For example, the workers that initially arrive to do the extractive labor and those that remain after and live through the longer-term impacts have different experiences. In the case of the Jharia coalfields, this is evident in both impacts on workers' health and impacts on the surrounding environment. Both are examples of slow violence because, while they have harmful effects on the peoples and environments in the area, these effects are gradual. It is these collective effects that gradually accumulate which Nixon identifies as slow violence. In the case of Jharia miners or other laborers, their health is impacted by consistent coal fires that release harmful chemicals like "sulfur dioxide, nitrogen oxides, lead and methane" into the environment. The effects range from respiratory challenges that may develop into disorders and nervous system damage. Environmental impacts are also spread out over time. Before mining started, the areas were "thick forests...populated with tribal communities". To create space for mining, these areas were deforested, and the tribal communities displaced. These communities also became "vulnerable to large-scale capitalist exploitation in the form of cheap causal labor". The environmental slow violence that occurred in the area has appeared in the form of chemical changes in the soil and water, unpredictable land movement, underground fires, and physical landscape degradation. S. and Shah attribute this to "years of unscientific mining and lack of standard practices such as backfilling".

The coal industry supports energy modernity, or "the improved conditions of social life enabled by energy transition from less efficient energy sources...to more efficient ones". The physical and mental distance from urban environments that the Jharia coalfields embody is an example of the ways that the impacts of energy are often invisible, hidden from the consumer or actor. While energy is consumed, seemingly inconsequentially, the environment and the health of miners slowly deteriorates.

=== Indigenous reserves ===
Slow violence has been recorded as affecting the Indigenous peoples that once inhabited Yuquot, British Columbia. Indigenous peoples were relocated from Yuquot to Ahaminaquus Indian Reserve 12, in Vancouver Island by the Canadian government in the late 1960s. The Department of Indian Affairs leased 30 acres of this land to Tasis Company who opened a Kraft pulp mill in 1968, on the same day of the closure of the Yuquot day school. The mill produced noise, air and water pollution, while also resulting in a road constructed over Muchalaht graves. Over time, the Department of Indian Affairs required the Indigenous peoples to give up their rights to reside on Ahaminaquus land, as well as their right to pursue health related claims from their residency. The Indigenous peoples claimed to have lost cultural opportunities and practices as a direct result of the pollution, as it was degrading the land. Paige Raibmon states that these circumstances represent modern-day colonialism.

=== Policing ===
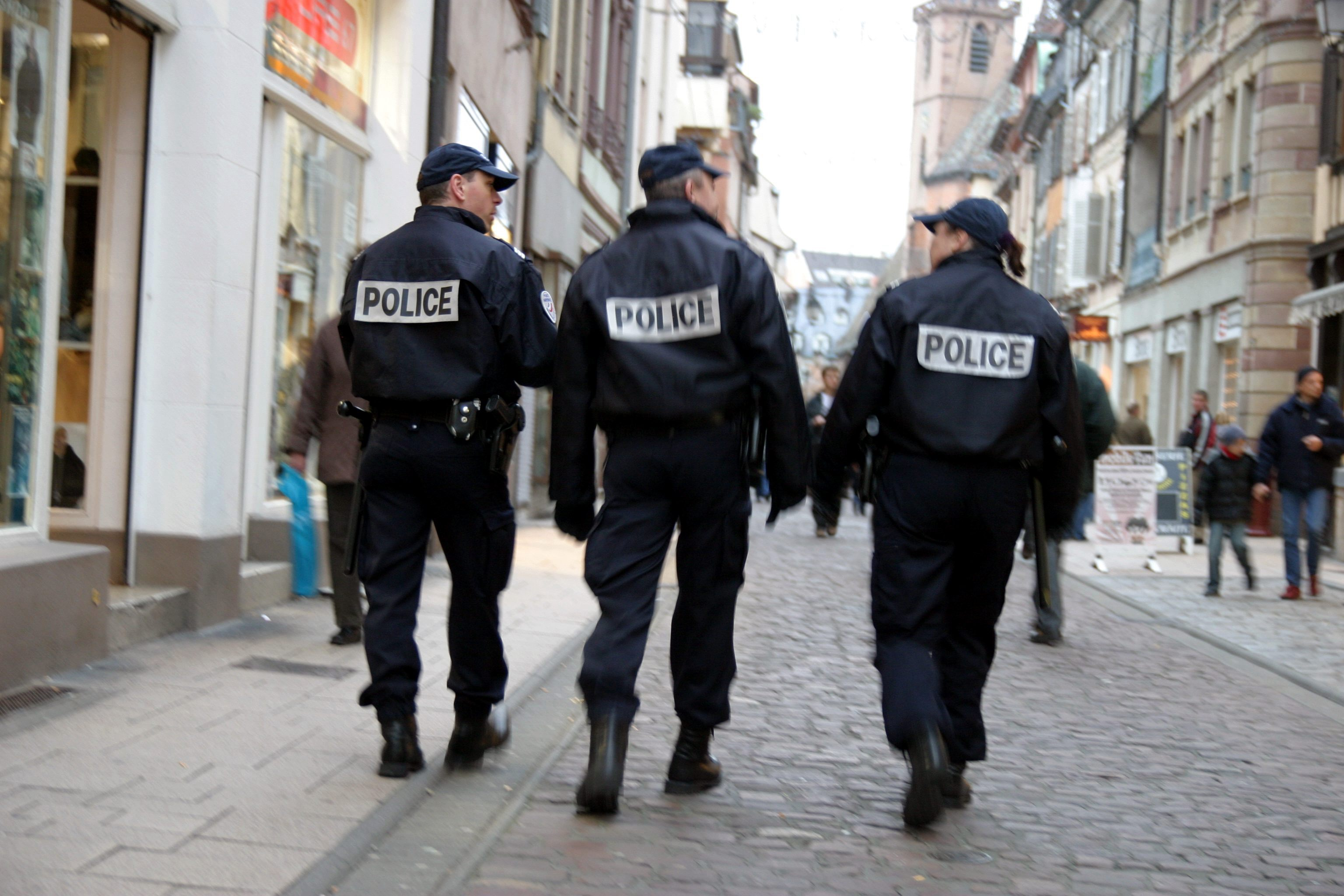

Contemporary policing has been reported as a form of slow violence against marginalized communities. Rory Kramer and Brianna Remster state that police impose slow violence on Black and Brown Americans through racial and class-based harms inflicted by the state. Slow violence results in cultural trauma for people of colour, which is defined as "when members of a collective feel they have been subjected to a horrendous event that leaves indelible marks upon their group consciousness, marking their memories forever and changing their future in fundamental and irrevocable ways."

=== Women ===
Women globally face instances of slow violence. Amy Piedalue, who conducted research in Hyderabad, India, states that the women "live and work in spaces of dispossession and marginalization", and that the slow violence they endure is specific to the dense urban settlement they exist in. They experience mobility constraints, due to economic resources being limited, as well as public safety concerns. Piedalue also reports that slow violence in these urban settlements is seen through illness, unemployment, hunger, the decaying of sanitation and infrastructures, and limited access to education.

Gender-based violence has also been experienced in the context of layered disasters over time in Bangladesh. Rezwana highlights the multi-dimensional and extended temporality of slow violence as an important facet in disaster response and recovery.

Slow violence does not only describe the impacts of environmental change, it can also describe intergenerational violence of women's underrepresentation in health. Slow violence in women has been shown over the years by things such as misdiagnosis, under-representation, and even assumption that women's bodies should act like men's bodies that are still affecting women today. The underrepresentation of women in clinical trials for medicine is harming women by mistreating a diagnosis, research gaps, and a historical bias towards men. In a paper about slow violence by Rob Nixon states that "slow violence is often not just attritional but also exponential, operating as a major threat multiplier; it can fuel long-term, proliferating conflicts in situations where the conditions for sustaining life become increasingly but gradually degraded." In this definition he says how sustaining life can be gradually degraded which can relate to how women can be affected through lack of presence in the practice of medicine.

Women are severely underrepresented in clinical trials, leading to adverse effects from medicine that usually would not happen to men. Men's bodies are the norm while women's bodies are considered 'atypical'. For example, cardiovascular disease is the leading cause of death in women. In 2023, it was estimated that over 300,000 or 1 in 5 women were killed by cardiovascular disease. However, the percentage of women participating in clinical trials for statin, a medication used to treat cardiovascular disease, is below 40%. An average of 28–38% of women diagnosed with cardiovascular disease participate in the clinical trials for this statin. This is causing generational problems for women with this disease because many of the chemicals that are used for statin can affect the body differently and cause more symptoms than expected.

The effects of prolonged conflict can also be experienced differently according to gender. In A Landscape of War (2022), Munira Khayyat examines how tobacco cultivation in Southern Lebanon relies on women's agricultural labour. While farming enables families to maintain their livelihoods despite war, women undertake most of the work.

=== Urban housing and land ownership ===
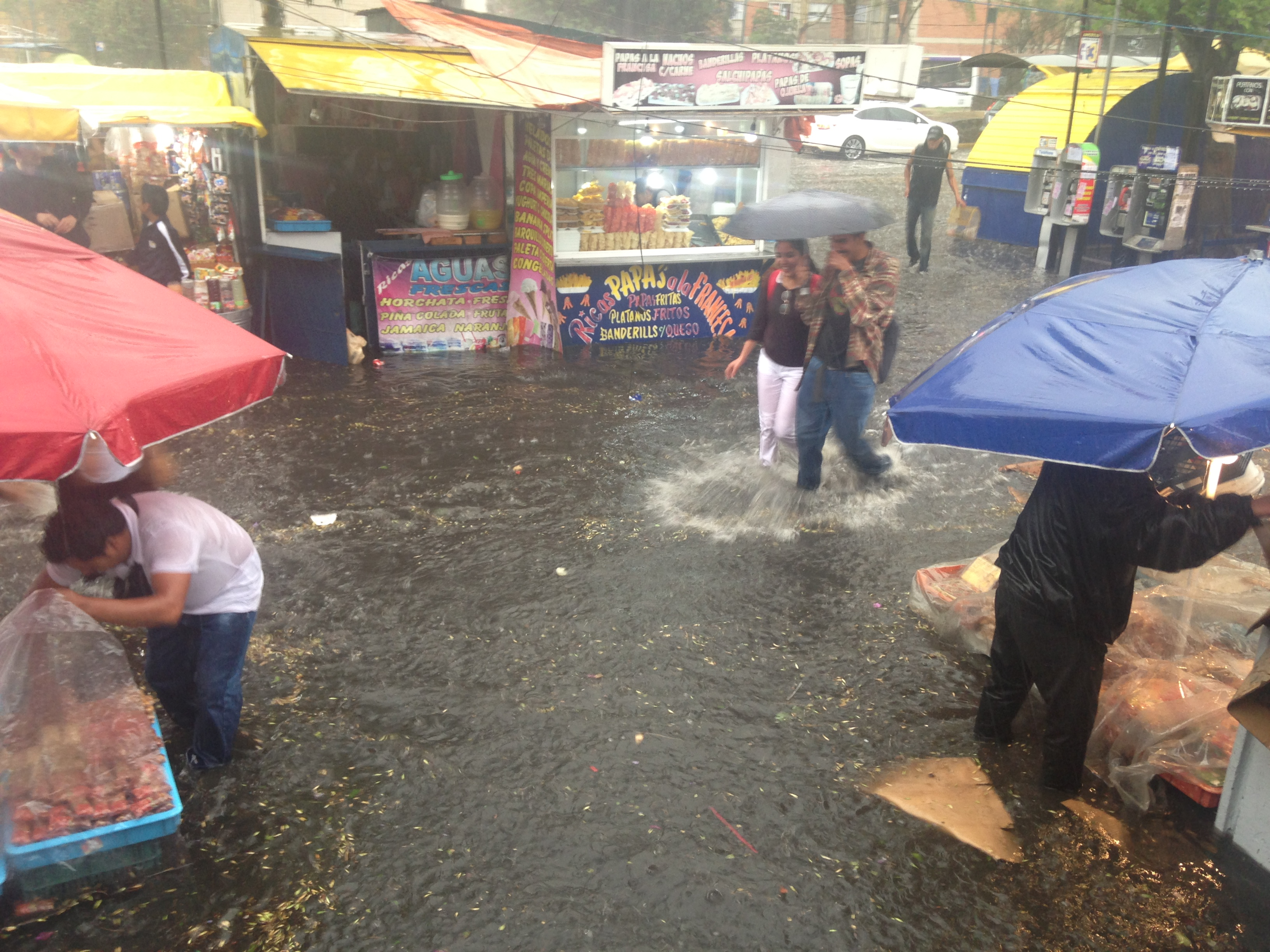
Mexico City Rainfall

Slow violence has been used in discussion of urban housing crises, such as in Chahim's work in Mexico City. Through fieldwork, Chahim identified that the flooding of drainage systems were engineered to consistently impact the poorer areas of Mexico City while preserving higher class areas. Normalization of this occurrence over time within the poorer population contributed to a slow temporality, and the violence Chahim identified was in the form of consistent and inequitably disruption of lives and property without consent.

Feminist geographer Rachel Pain brought Nixon's concept into conversation with feminist readings of trauma to document how housing dispossession in the UK has also been an example of slow violence. Pain describes how globalization, gentrification and displacement, and other psychological effects of violence experienced over time and across generations lead to "chronic urban trauma". Pain has also extended Nixon's framework to highlight how such dispossession targets particular categories of people and places, adding critical feminist and anti-racist perspectives that were missing from Nixon's framework.

Slow violence has also been mentioned in concerns related to rhino poaching in Mozambique's Limpopo National Park. A call for such violence to be addressed in order to better mobilize a response was featured in a literary work. This work also discussed the region's experience of slow violence through conservation-related resettlement.

=== Colonialism ===
Slow violence through time and space is also said to be enacted through means of colonialism such as that of the Hawaiian overthrow by the U.S. Authors on the subject of the Overthrow of the Hawaiian Kingdom identify slow violence in the context of slow invasion. This can include physical invasion but also invasion through epidemics, missionaries, plantations, militarism, tourism, unemployment, displacement, health problems, and gendered representation/oppression. Tengan claims that the stereotypical Hula Girl's gendered and sexualized nature both attracts tourism and hinders movements towards honoring traditional Hawaiian masculinities, and is an example of slow invasion of gendered representation in his 2014 work. Hawai'ian sovereignty has continued to be denied despite lawsuits regarding the matter.

=== Asylum seekers ===
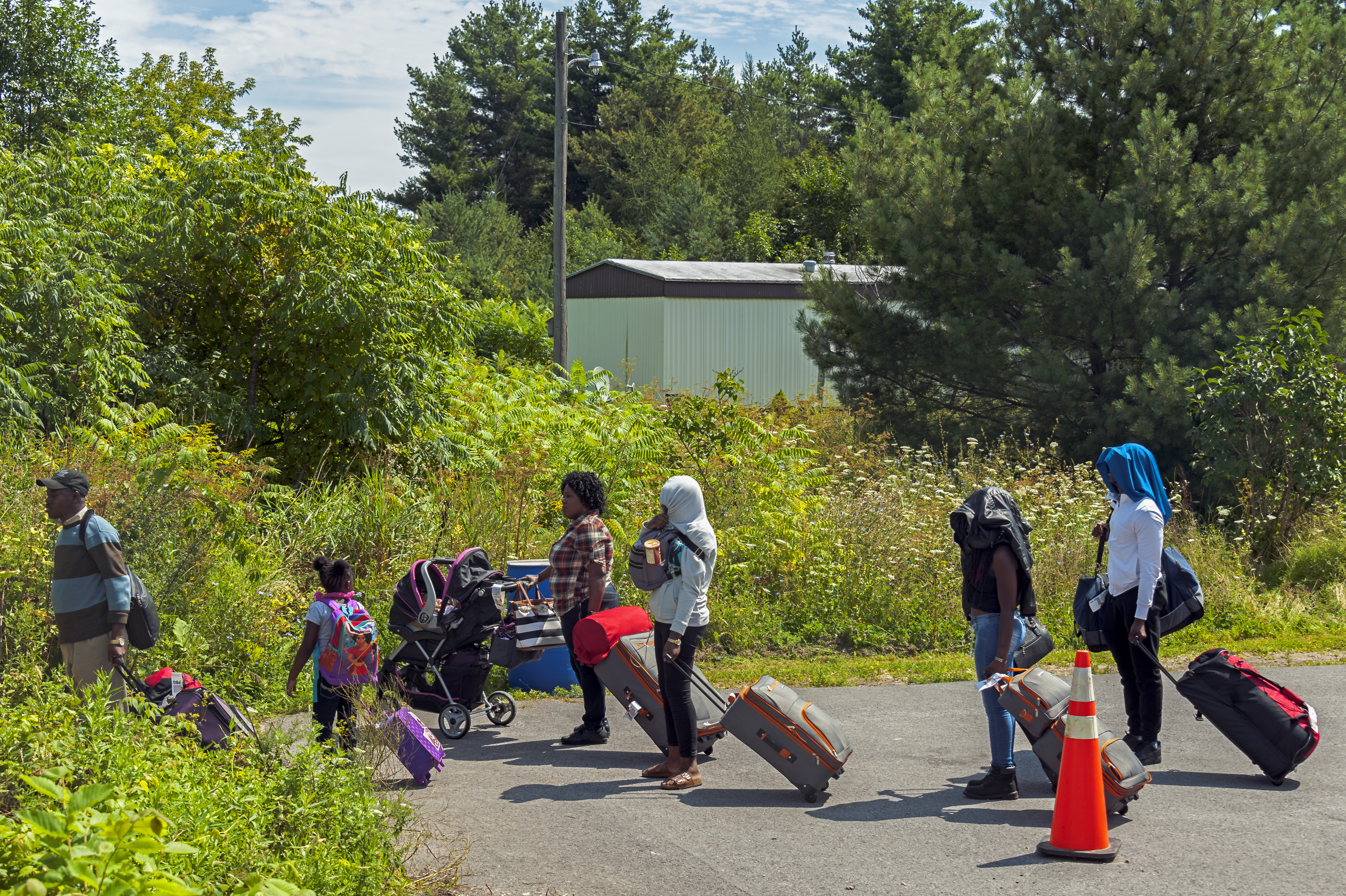
Asylum seekers

Slow violence has also been related to immigration and asylum seeking processes. Violence enacted through abandonment by political frameworks as an outcome of the mechanisms of power relations is said to leave gradual long-term effects on the mental and physical health of asylum seekers. This involves a denial of the basic rights of humans as outlined by Agamben. This is said to qualify both the experience of slow violence and spurring the response of slow resistance.

== Responses ==
The responses of communities impacted by slow violence range from counter-violent agendace and slow resistance to forms of ignorance and resignation. This section presents prominent types of responses to slow violence.

Resistance towards slow violence often occurs in the form of environmentalism. These movements when countering slow violence may refuse the distinction between environmental and social justice. For example, in Kenya, the Green Belt Movement mobilize the gradual violence of deforestation and soil erosion. The Movement was positioned at the crossroads between environmental and women's rights, because the environmental degradation being countered has common origins with the dispossession of economic resources during the colonial regime, especially towards women.

=== Slow resistance ===
Slow resistance has been referenced as a response to slow violence, and can include resistance through protests, exercising performative rights, everyday resistance, hunger strikes, and more. Slow resistance can function as an "umbrella concept" that can include many forms of non-organized and organized forms of resistance. Global resistance against racial violence amidst the effects of the COVID-19 pandemic is a specific characterization of slow resistance as discussed by Pain.

Slow nonviolence has been suggested as a method of counter-violence by Piedalue who theorizes it, "as focused on long-term incremental change, which not only responds to violence but is also productive of alternative visions and modalities of nonviolent social relationships and interdependencies". Piedalue states that slow nonviolence is a method of undoing future and past violence. Slow nonviolence approaches include protests, engagement from media sources, and public events, but as Piedalue states it operates mostly "through the intimacies of everyday life" and spaces such as homes or schools.

Everyday practices of survival can also be understood as forms of resistance to prolonged violence. Munira Khayyat introduces the concept of "resistant ecologies" to describe how relationships between people, land, plants and animals sustain life. In Southern Lebanon, activities such as farming and taking care of the livestock enable communities to maintain their presence on the land despite displacement pressures and economic insecurities.

=== Manipulations of time ===
Chloe Ahmann's report on the Fairfield Renewable Energy Project, highlights ways time can be used to create resistance to slow violence. She describes three types of temporality: incrementality, deferral or delay, and concentration. Incrementality most closely mirrors slow violence by working to gradually create resistance, increasing its effects over time. An example of this could be small victories in legislative battles, stalling or delaying projects momentarily, or slowly building public awareness to create a growing community of resistance. This strategy accumulates and creates counter-systems as it progresses. Deferral or delay often takes the form of enforcement of regulations or legislative action. These strategies use the timelines of judicial or legislative processes – which are often lengthy – as a barrier that limits the ability of those creating or contributing to slow violence. This then eases the pressure of time constraints for activists or protestors. Finally, concentration utilizes deadlines and quick action to pressure actors and force a decision to be made.

=== Environmental photography ===
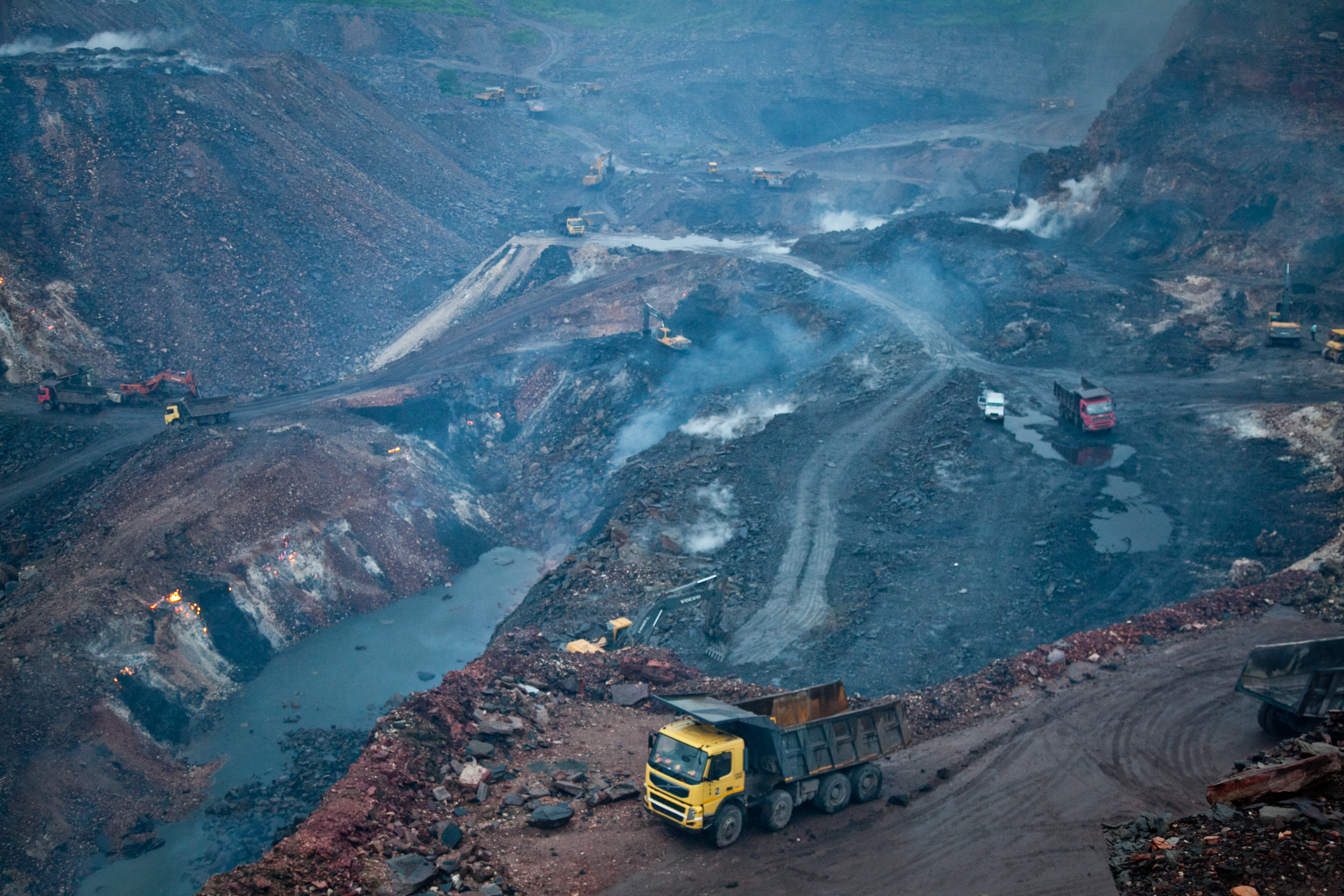
Jharia coalfields

Environmental photography is a valuable tool for resisting, or uncovering the effects of, slow violence. Capturing the impacts of slow violence can interrupt the invisibility of long timelines over which it acts or unhide it from view if it is physically obscured or distant. Photographs of the Jharia coalfields, as described by Meenakshi S. and Krupa Shah, contrast the "slowly unfolding horrors of slow violence" with the "quicker sensation of the visual medium". In cases like these where slow violence is occurring in locations set far aside from public view, photography can bridge this gap. Photography not only captures the effects of slow violence in the moment, but through exposure to the realities of these extractive energy industries, it can actively resist slow violence by bringing these effects to a wider audience.

=== Disfiguration ===
Slow violence does not always provoke politics of resistance; on the contrary, it can deeply entrench the status quo. Trlifaj documents this dynamic in the context of severe air pollution in Sarajevo. Through prolonged exposure and the apparent impossibility of resolving this type of slow violence, pollution gradually imprints on the bodies of residents, limiting their capacity to breathe and - through repeated failiure at improvement - imagine alternative political futures. Trlifaj terms this process disfiguration, framing it in opposition to prefiguration.

These cases complicate conventional understanding of political mobilization against slow violence. Nixon originally argued that the primary challenge of fighting slow violence lies in making it visible, "plotting and giving figurative shape to formless threats whose fatal repercussions are dispersed across space and time". In the case of disfigurating dynamics, however, exactly the visibility of environmental degradation inhibits rather than spurs resistance.

=== Unnoticing and Resigned Activism ===
The protracted nature of slow violence not always leads to political responses. Affected communities may develop practices of contrived ignorance or pgramatic adaptation. Lou traces practices of unnoticing among residents of souther Chinese city living adjacent to hazardou petrochemical plants. Despite being fully aware of the ongoing dangers of toxic pollution and potential chemical exposure, the residents often practice what Lou terms the art of unnoticing - a strategy of deliberate inaction and contrived ignorance that allows people in highly precarious positions to maintain a sense of normality and reclaim a degree of psychological agency while enduring environmental harm.

Lora-Wainwright, also working in industralizing rural China, expands on this localized coping mechanism, where communities are routinely exposed to severe contamination from phosphorus mining, e-waste processing, and lead and zinc mining. Rather than attempting to subvert the broader structural and political causes of slow violence, these villagers engage in what Lora-Wainwright calls resigned activism. This highly constrained form of engagement consists of "small steps individuals and families take in order to minimize the physical, psychological, and social effects of pollution". such as wearing protective masks or attempts to prevent children and pregnant women from accessing toxic sites.

== Digital slow violence ==
=== Overview ===
In 2022, Canadian scholar Rachel Brydolf-Horwitz published a study on slow violence in the digital space, "Embodied and Entangled: Slow Violence and Harm via Digital Technologies," which expanded on Nixon's development of the concept of slow violence. Nixon's 2011 book juxtaposed two differing manifestations of violence. The first represents traditional ideas of violence, emphasized by quick, explosive, and visually stunning acts. The second category is slow violence, defined according to its gradual and cumulative nature, which frequently goes unrecognized due to its temporal complexity and lack of instant, dramatic exposure. Brydolf-Horwitz argues that within the digital realm, slow violence is further concealed by the complicated and ever-changing structure of the digital environment, which covers not just the tools themselves but also the social behaviors and assumptions they impact.

In her research, Brydolf-Horwitz utilizes the example of Rehtaeh Parsons in Nova Scotia as an example of how digital technology may allow slow violence through repeated verbal and textual attacks, as well as the nonconsensual sharing of personal photos. She posits that while the phrase "cyberbullying" is commonly used to characterize such behaviors, it can sometimes hide the deeper and more long-term harm perpetrated on people. Brydolf-Horwitz's research intended to present new terminology to express these experiences in the digital space, in order to encourage support for recognizing and treating the unseen and difficult-to-address components of digital slow violence. She additionally argued that outlining targets is vital for accountability and providing assistance and resources.

In closing, Brydolf-Horwitz posits that digital slow violence underscores the need for more comprehensive knowledge of the roots and cases of violence in the era of digital use. It prompts policymakers, medical professionals, and other relevant actors to evaluate the long-term consequences of digital connections and how they might impair people's well-being.

==== Nova Scotia case study ====
Brydolf-Horwitz's research profiles the story of Rehtaeh Parsons from Nova Scotia as a case study in the phenomenon of digital slow violence. In 2011, the suicides of three young women in Nova Scotia, including Parsons, pushed the issue cyberbullying to the forefront of Canadian society and politics, leading the formation of the Nova Scotian provincial government's Task Force on Bullying and Cyberbullying. Her research suggests that digital technology played a critical role in magnifying the abuse experienced by these individuals, prompting a public uproar and government action. Brydolf-Horwitz maintains that these women's cases highlight the serious ramifications of using modern technology as instruments for harassment and abuse, which can have potentially negative, and in some instances fatal, effects.

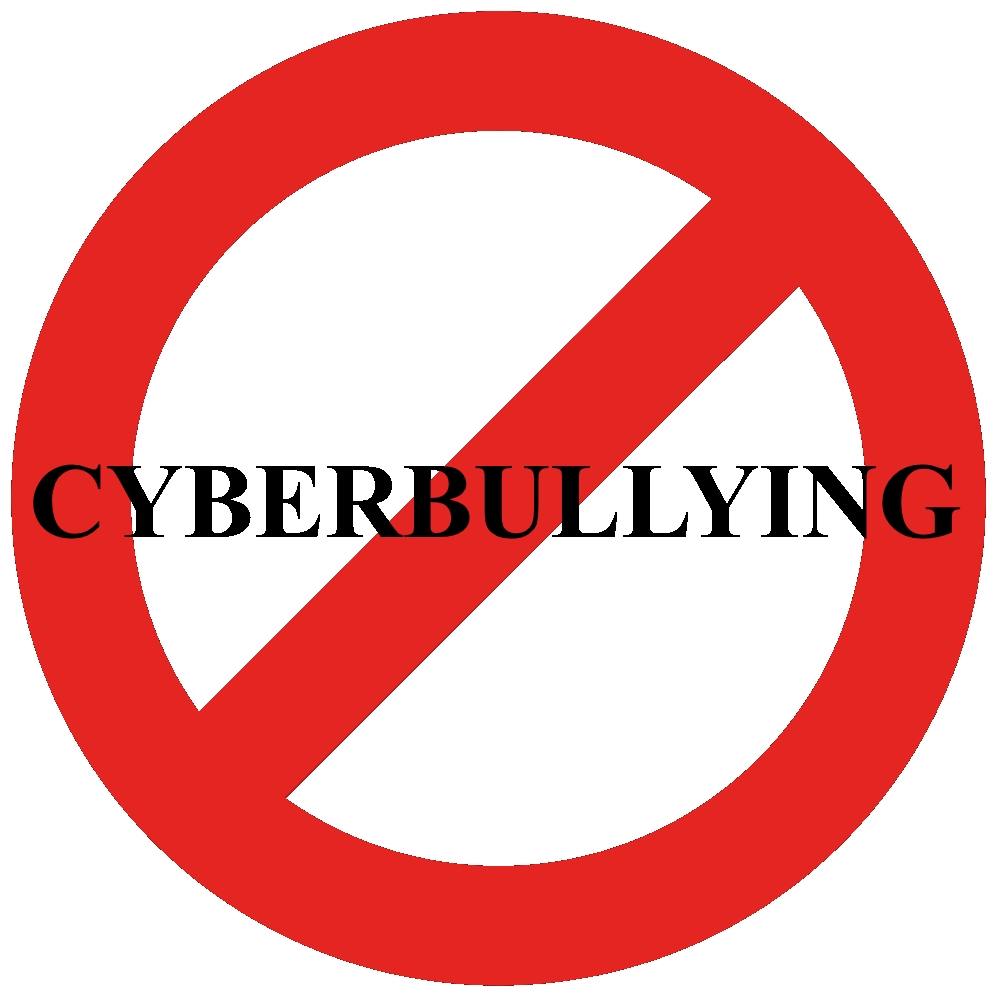
Advocacy against cyberbullying is prominent in the era of digital and social media.

In Brydolf-Horwitz's analysis, the example of Parsons' experience emphasizes the mix of sexual assault and cyberbullying. After attacking the victim at a party, the perpetrators widely shared a photograph of the incident, sparking an aggressive and unrelenting campaign of internet harassment against Parsons. This instance clearly depicts the notion of gradual violence through digital means, in which the injury is sustained and amplified over time.

===== Digital challenges and surveillance capitalism =====
At the Association for Computing Machinery's (ACM) 2023 Conference on Fairness, Accountability, and Transparency (FAccT), four presenting authors argued that surveillance capitalism, particularly through the mechanism of online behavioral advertising (OBA), represents a potential avenue of manifested "slow violence." This form of advertising, which tracks an individual's online activities to deliver personalized ads, has been identified as a source of "slow violence" against users. In a conference paper titled, "The Slow Violence of Surveillance Capitalism", the authors explore various ways that OBA is perceived to inflict harm, drawing on findings from a survey of 420 participants. Based on respondents' feedback, the authors categorized the negative impacts of OBA into four broad areas: psychological distress, loss of autonomy, behavior constriction, and algorithmic marginalization and traumatization.

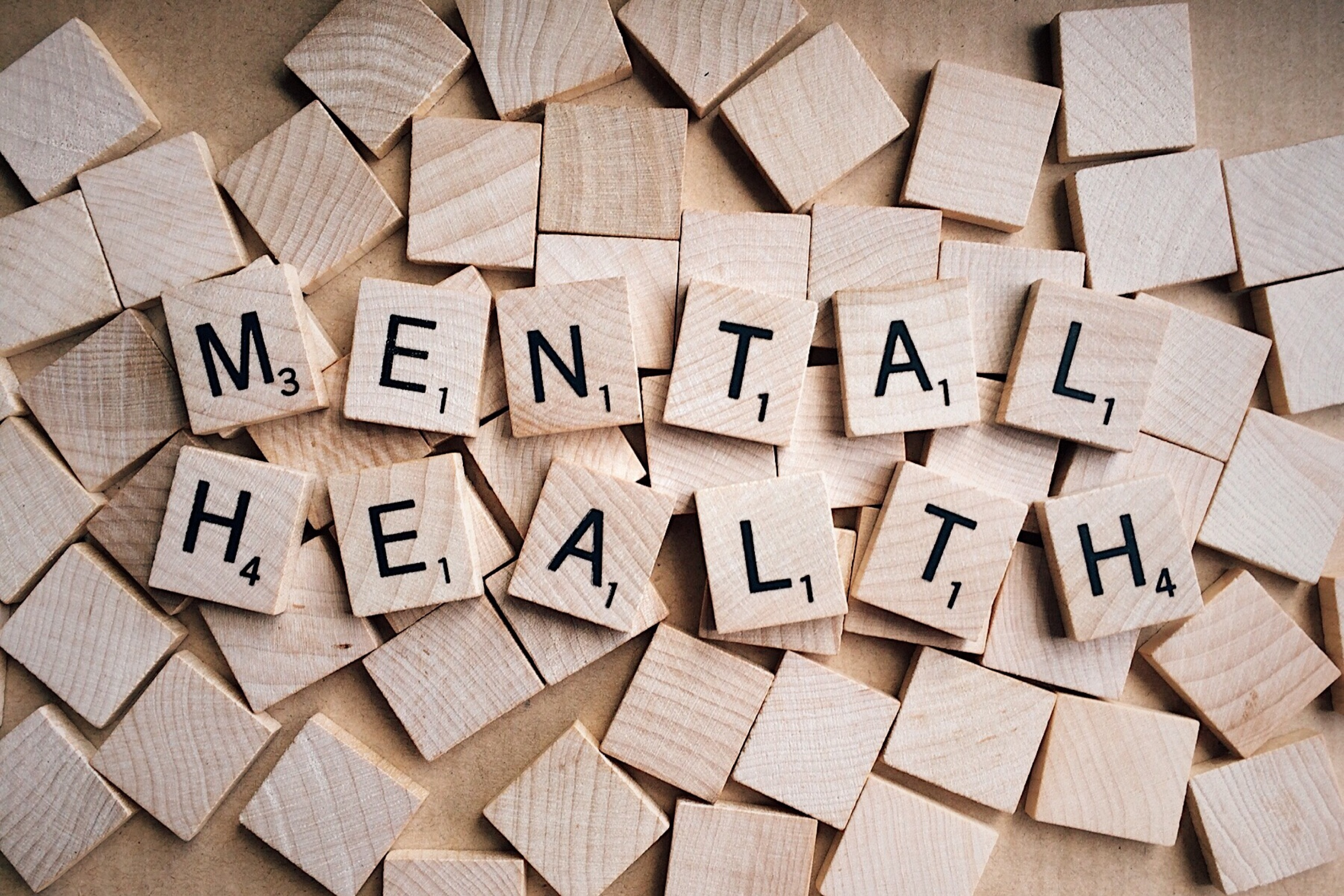
Many institutions aim to prioritize mental health

Psychological distress: Users typically express uneasiness and concern about the precision and intrusiveness of targeted marketing. This emotional disturbance originates from the intrusive nature of OBA, where users believe their privacy is continuously invaded, resulting to a state of perpetual vigilance and anxiety about what is being observed and inferred about their life.

Loss of autonomy: Surveillance capitalism, through OBA, undermines user autonomy by providing the illusion of choice. User behavior is extensively affected and formed by underlying algorithms that anticipate and manipulate user activities for commercial advantage. This manipulation limits actual free choice, making consumers feel vulnerable and controlled.

Behavior Constriction: Users revise their interactions with technical systems in response to other perceived damage to their wellbeing from OBA. Users adopt additional privacy and security behavioral restrictions, causing losses in usability and utility of devices and services. Users also waste time and resources as a result of such .

Algorithmic Marginalization and Traumatization: Harm to personal characteristics (such as racial or ethnic background) or physical vulnerabilities (such as sensitive medical data). This phenomenon causes users to feel diminished based on being targeted for particularistic, user-specific characteristics, as opposed to a broader feeling of being overwhelmed by OBA.
