= Resistencia, Chaco =

Resistencia Ciudad de Resistencia
- City
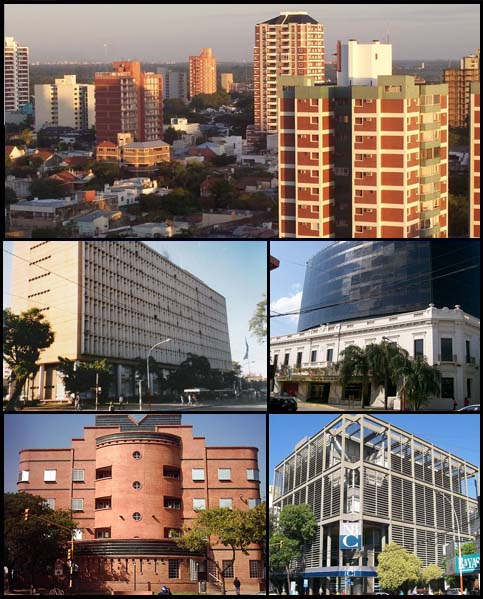
- (From top to bottom; from left to right) Panoramic view of the city; Chaco Government House; Palacio de Justicia of Resistencia; Resistencia Casino & Hotel and the New Bank of Chaco.

- Flag Coat of arms
- Nickname: City of sculptures
- Location of Resistencia within Argentina
- Coordinates: 27°27′05″S 58°59′12″W
- Country: Argentina
- Province: Chaco
- Department: San Fernando
- Established: 1878

Government
  - Intendant: Gustavo Martínez (PJ)

Area
  - City: 562 km^{2} (217 sq mi)
- Elevation: 20 m (66 ft)

Population (2022)
  - City: 296,913
  - Rank: 13th in Argentina
  - Density: 528/km^{2} (1,370/sq mi)
  - Urban: 407,618
  - Metro: 461,000
- Time zone: UTC−3 (ART)
- Postal code: H3500
- Area code: +54 362
- Climate: Cfa
- Website: www.mr.gov.ar

Resistencia (pronounced [resisˈtensja]) is the capital and largest city of the province of Chaco in north-eastern Argentina. According to the 2010 census, the population of the city proper was 291,720 inhabitants. It is the anchor of a larger metropolitan area, Greater Resistencia, which comprises at least three more municipalities for a total population of 387,340 as of 2010. This conurbation is the largest in the province, and the eleventh most populous in the country. It is located along the Negro River, a tributary of the much larger Paraná River, opposite the city of Corrientes, Corrientes Province.

The area was originally inhabited by Guaycuru aboriginals such as the Tobas. Their resistance to evangelisation postponed substantial European settlement until the late 19th century. Not until 1865 was a proper settlement established, and on January 27, 1878, Resistencia was formally established as the territorial capital. The national government supported immigration, and in 1878 the first Italian immigrants arrived. The first City Council was made up entirely of members originating from that country.

== History ==
=== Colonial period ===
The area where Resistencia lies was the site of the Guaycuru peoples, pedestrian tribes that live on hunting and fishing. Of these, the Abipón to the south of Bermejo were the first to advance towards central and southern Chaco. The Abipones were composed of three groups: the Riicagé (people of the open countryside), the nacaigetergé (people of the forest) and the Yaaucanigá (people of the river), each with their own dialect. The Payaguá settled on the Paraguay River at north of the Bermejo River, and they were engaged in trade and piracy along the Paraná-Paraguay River.

The Spanish had traversed the entire perimeter of the Chaco between 1541 and 1580. In 1588, Corrientes was founded on the opposite bank of the Parana.

=== Foundation ===
Resistencia was founded on January 27, 1878, the date on which the initial measurement was approved (executed by Arturo Seelstrang) and officially created.

The date of February 2 is celebrated as the arrival date of the first Friulian immigrants. However, historical studies agree that it was the same day of creation of the colony. The initial colonization process was the result of an official policy of settlement of this region based on Immigration Law No. 817, widespread in Europe during those years. The progress was partly due to the contribution of institutions such as the Italian Society, founded by the first Italians and which brought together a large part of the professional community, including medical partners, architects, lawyers, politicians, among others.

=== 20th century ===
In 1953 the National Territory of the Chaco was declared a province and Resistencia, which was already the capital of the National Territory, becomes the provincial capital. On July 3, 1939, Pope Pius XII split the diocese of Santa Fe to create the Diocese of Resistencia, which was elevated to an archdiocese on April 1, 1984, by John Paul II.

In the decade of the 1950s, during the governorship of Felipe Gallardo and Deolindo Felipe Bittel, the construction of the Resistencia International Airport was initiated. The public transport service Resistencia-Barranqueras was created, along with numerous buildings for schools, police stations, municipalities and health centers.

== Geography ==
The city is located along the Negro River, a tributary of the much larger Paraná River, opposite the city of Corrientes, Corrientes Province.

=== Climate ===
Resistencia is one of the warmest cities in Argentina, and is known for its extremely hot, humid summer weather with frequent lightning. The climate is humid subtropical (Köppen climate classification Cfa), with a cooler, dryer season and a long, humid summer. Autumn and spring are often marked by sudden transitions from summer weather patterns to winter weather patterns.

During the summer, temperatures attain highs of 30 to 35 °C (86.0 to 95.0 °F) on a daily basis, and occasionally up to 38 °C (100.4 °F). The record temperature is 44.4 °C (111.9 °F) on October 16, 2014. Nights are warm and sticky, between 19 and 25 °C (66.2 and 77.0 °F), and afternoon thunderstorms are common. The transition to autumn is slow: March's temperatures are very similar to midsummer, and April is still warm with an average high of 26.2 °C (79.2 °F) and a low of 17.0 °C (62.6 °F), and rainfall is very abundant: 284.9 millimetres (11 in) during that month. The dry, cool season starts in May and lasts until September. During its peak in June and July, the average high is 20 °C (68.0 °F) and the average low is 10 °C (50.0 °F), with rainfall below 50 millimetres (2 in) in a month. These averages reflect the fact that there are two distinct weather patterns that alternate in the winter: the northerly, tropical pattern, and the southerly pattern of the Pampas: thus, there are periods of very warm, dry weather (25 to 30 °C (77.0 to 86.0 °F)) with warm nights (15 °C (59.0 °F)) followed by strong southerly winds, often accompanied with drizzle and temperatures that hover around 10 °C (50.0 °F) for days at a time (creating a surprisingly cold feeling), followed by dry air and blue skies and cold nights (2 to 6 °C (35.6 to 42.8 °F)) and pleasant, cool days between 15 and 20 °C (59.0 and 68.0 °F)). Light frost occurs under very calm conditions with cold air in place; usually measured temperatures will hover between 0 and 3 °C (32.0 and 37.4 °F) but frost will cover the ground. On occasion, however, under very cold weather patterns, measured temperatures reach −2 °C (28.4 °F), with a record low of −4.7 °C (23.5 °F) on June 29, 1996.

Climate data for Resistencia, Chaco (1991–2020, extremes 1965–present)
Month	Jan	Feb	Mar	Apr	May	Jun	Jul	Aug	Sep	Oct	Nov	Dec	Year
Record high °C (°F)	43.7 (110.7)	43.5 (110.3)	43.3 (109.9)	38.1 (100.6)	35.5 (95.9)	34.1 (93.4)	35.5 (95.9)	38.0 (100.4)	43.5 (110.3)	44.4 (111.9)	43.5 (110.3)	42.3 (108.1)	44.4 (111.9)
Mean daily maximum °C (°F)	33.4 (92.1)	32.3 (90.1)	30.7 (87.3)	27.4 (81.3)	23.7 (74.7)	21.7 (71.1)	21.6 (70.9)	24.4 (75.9)	26.2 (79.2)	28.5 (83.3)	30.1 (86.2)	32.2 (90.0)	27.7 (81.9)
Daily mean °C (°F)	26.9 (80.4)	26.1 (79.0)	24.5 (76.1)	21.4 (70.5)	17.7 (63.9)	15.8 (60.4)	14.8 (58.6)	16.9 (62.4)	19.2 (66.6)	22.2 (72.0)	23.8 (74.8)	26.0 (78.8)	21.3 (70.3)
Mean daily minimum °C (°F)	21.2 (70.2)	20.8 (69.4)	19.4 (66.9)	16.4 (61.5)	12.8 (55.0)	11.1 (52.0)	9.4 (48.9)	10.7 (51.3)	12.9 (55.2)	16.5 (61.7)	17.7 (63.9)	20.1 (68.2)	15.7 (60.3)
Record low °C (°F)	10.6 (51.1)	9.4 (48.9)	5.8 (42.4)	2.1 (35.8)	−3.2 (26.2)	−4.7 (23.5)	−3.8 (25.2)	−4.1 (24.6)	−1.4 (29.5)	1.4 (34.5)	4.4 (39.9)	7.7 (45.9)	−4.7 (23.5)
Average precipitation mm (inches)	179.9 (7.08)	156.8 (6.17)	161.0 (6.34)	165.1 (6.50)	86.7 (3.41)	59.9 (2.36)	24.4 (0.96)	35.3 (1.39)	53.6 (2.11)	138.2 (5.44)	175.5 (6.91)	156.7 (6.17)	1,393.1 (54.85)
Average precipitation days (≥ 0.1 mm)	9.1	8.9	8.8	8.6	7.7	6.8	4.7	4.5	6.8	10.3	9.6	9.4	95.2
Average relative humidity (%)	71.5	74.1	76.7	80.0	82.2	81.9	76.6	70.5	68.8	71.9	71.2	71.4	74.7
Mean monthly sunshine hours	235.6	206.2	186.0	171.0	158.1	126.0	151.9	170.5	156.0	182.9	228.0	229.4	2,201.6
Mean daily sunshine hours	7.6	7.3	6.0	5.7	5.1	4.2	4.9	5.5	5.2	5.9	7.6	7.4	6.0
Source: Servicio Meteorológico Nacional

== Economy ==
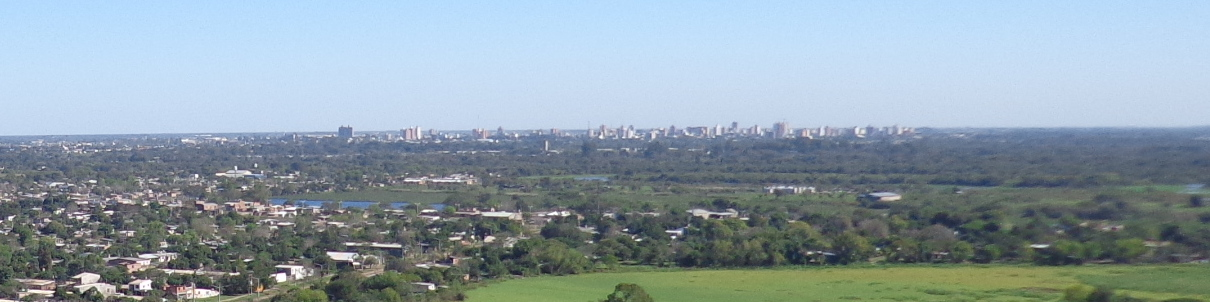
Resistencia skyline seen from Barranqueras silos.

The city's economy, originally based on agriculture and trade, has diversified into the service sector in recent decades.

== Culture ==
Resistencia is known nationally as the "city of sculptures" and "open-air museum" because of the more than 500 monuments and other works of art spread among its streets.

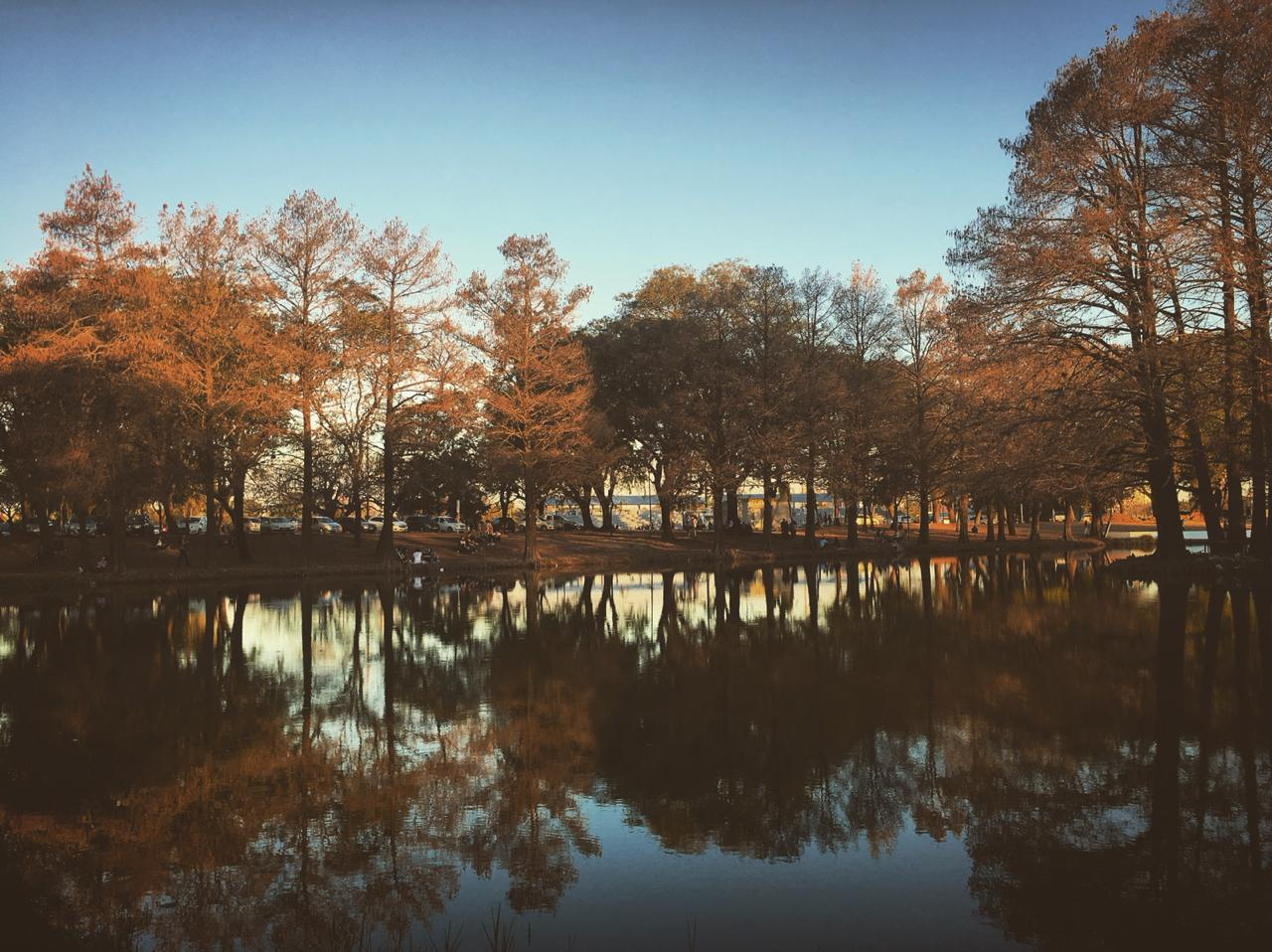
2 de Febrero park

The city has organized a Biennial International Sculptures Contest since 1988; after each contest the sculptures remain in the city for public display in parks or sidewalks. Since 1997, the event has been sponsored by UNESCO. Resistencia is also home to a number of museums, including the René Bruseau Provincial Museum of Fine Arts, the Augusto Schulz Museum of Natural History, the Juan Alfredo Martinet Museum of Anthropology, the Ichoalay Cultural Museum, and the Ertivio Acosta Museum of Man in Chaco.

== Transport ==
The city has been served by Resistencia International Airport since 1965; its terminal, completed in 1971, was designed by renowned modernist architect Amancio Williams. An area control centre, providing en-route air traffic control services to the northeastern corner of Argentina, is located here. Its access via highways includes National Route 11 (north to south), National Route 16 (westbound), and the General Belgrano Bridge, which has connected Resistencia to its twin port city of Corrientes since 1973. Following the closure of rail lines in the area during the privatization of the nation's railways in the early 1990s, the city's rail links were re-established with the opening of the provincially funded Sefecha line in 1997.

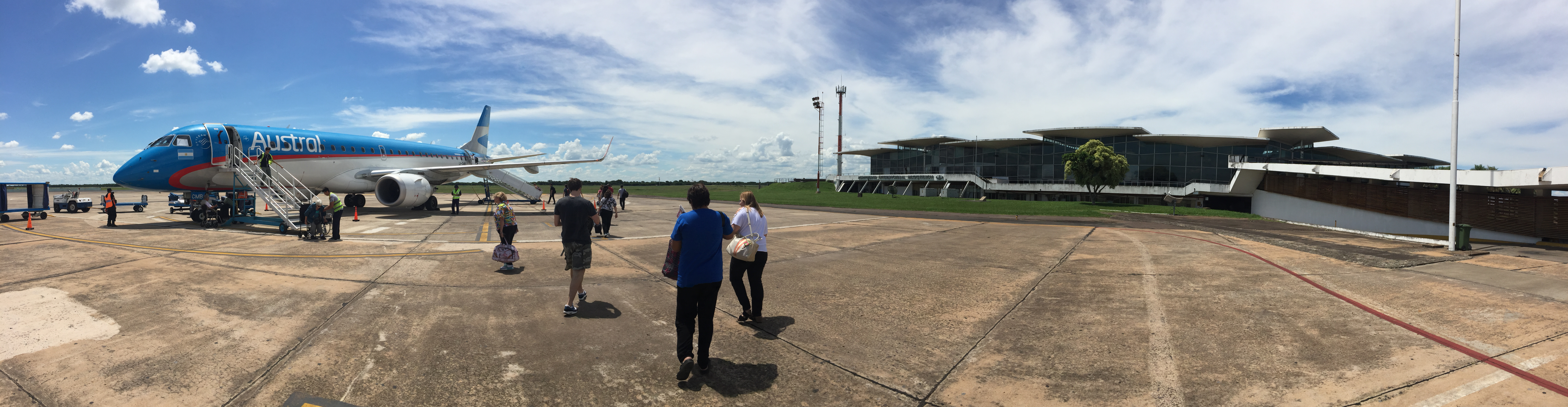
Panoramic view of the airport as seen from the runway. The airplane is an Embraer 190 from Austral Líneas Aéreas destined to the city of Buenos Aires.

== Twin towns – sister cities ==
Resistencia is twinned with:

- Udine, Italy (1978)
- Trento, Italy
- Asunción, Paraguay (2006)
- Tarija, Bolivia
- São Vicente, Brazil (2006)

== Notable people ==
- Emilio Ambasz, architect
- Miguel Ángel Carbonell, footballer
- Elisa Carrió, politician
- Emiliano Grillo, professional golfer
- Matías Martínez, footballer
- Juan Manuel Silva, racing driver
- Shmuel Hadas, Israeli diplomat
- Etel Solingen, political scientist
- Claudio Echeverri, footballer

== See also ==
- Resistencia Biennial International Sculptures Contest
