= Molins de Rei =

- Municipality
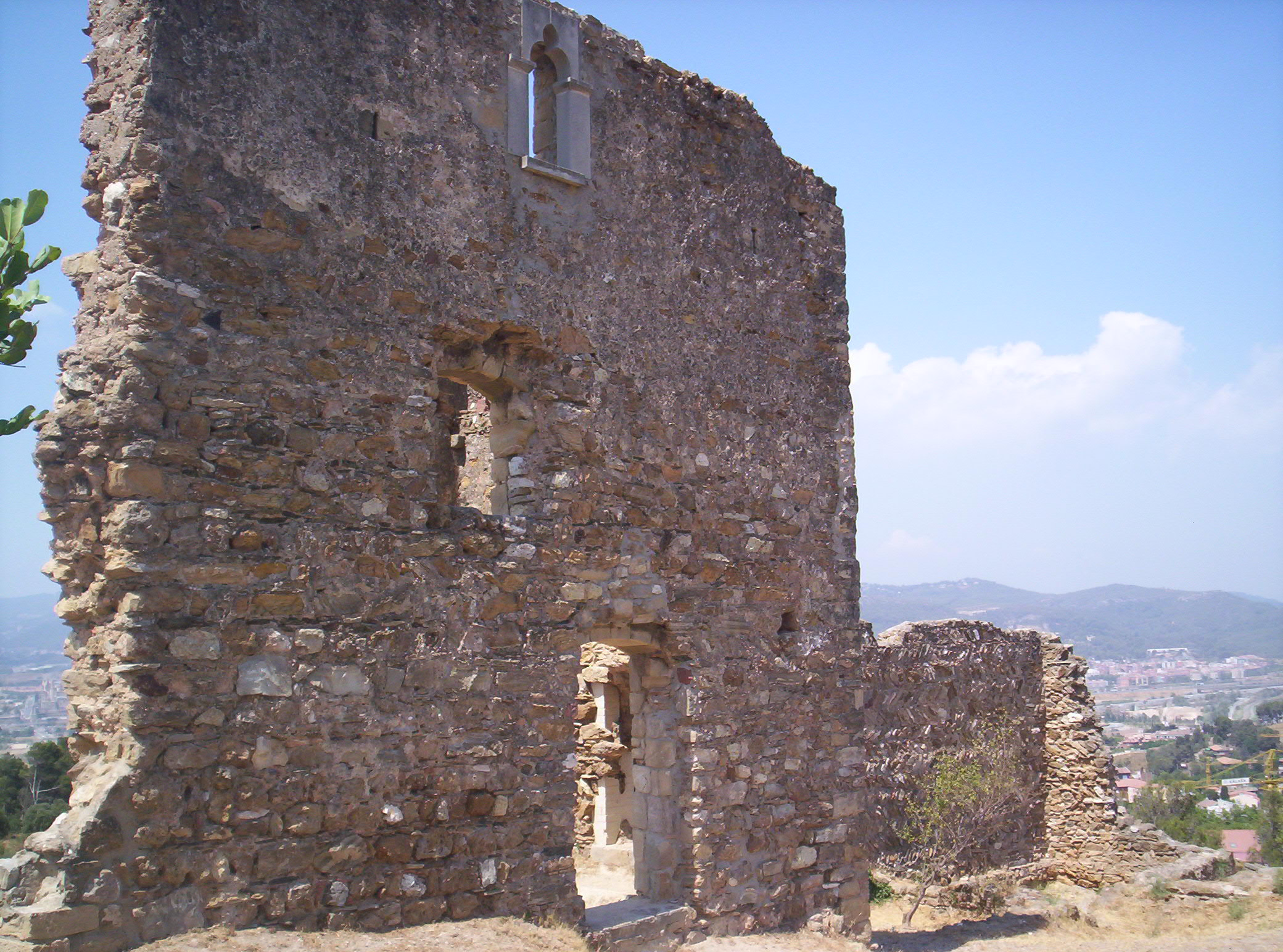
- Castellciuró Castle.

- Coat of arms

- Location in the Province of Barcelona Location in Catalonia Location in Spain
- Coordinates: 41°24′50″N 2°00′57″E
- Country: Spain
- Community: Catalonia
- Province: Barcelona
- Comarca: Baix Llobregat

Government
  - Mayor (2019— ): Martulina Espallargas

Area
  - Total: 15.9 km^{2} (6.1 sq mi)
- Elevation: 37 m (121 ft)

Population (2025-01-01)
  - Total: 27,300
  - Density: 1,720/km^{2} (4,450/sq mi)
- Demonym: Molinenc
- Postal code: 08750
- Website: www.molinsderei.cat

Molins de Rei (Catalan pronunciation: [muˈlinz ðə ˈrej]) is a municipality located 18 km from Barcelona's city centre, in the comarca of Baix Llobregat in Catalonia, Spain. It is situated on the left bank of the Llobregat river, on the A-7 autopista from Valencia to La Jonquera and the main N-II road.

Its location has made Molins de Rei a strategic municipality, with examples of commercial and industrial entrepreneurship.

== History ==
Its name, Molins de Rei (which means King's Mills), has its origins in the royal windmills that existed in this area, documented as early as 1188. These mills were built by order of the King Alfonso II, and their construction essentially established the municipality. By 1208, a parish and church as well as a cemetery had been built in the town.

In 1309, the town was part of the county of Pallars which belonged to the countess Sibil·la. When she died, the town changed owners to Hugo de Arborea and later on, it was transferred to the convent of Santa Clara in Sardinia (Italy). Again in 1366, the lands were purchased by Berenguer de Relat. In 1430, it was again transferred to Galceran de Requesens i de Santacoloma who built a palace in the village, visited by personalities of the time such as the Catholic Monarchs or Christopher Columbus.

In 1763, a bridge was built to cross the Llobregat river, by order of the King Charles III of Spain. This bridge turned the village into a strategic location during the Peninsular War, and the town was subjected to grave attacks and fires in several occasions. During these attacks, several significant buildings were destroyed, such as the Palace of Requesens.

== Main sights ==
The Palace of Recasens, ruined by a looting during the 19th century, dates from the 15th century.

Outside the town are the ruins of the Castellciuró castle, built in 1066—perhaps over a previous Visigoth fortification— and destroyed in 985 by troops of al-Mansur Ibn Abi Aamir. Remains include a tower and parts of the walls.

The Romanesque chapel of Sant Pere de Romaní, known from 1011, has a rectangular shape, with a barrel vaulted ceiling, and a bell tower.

== Transportation ==
The Molins de Rei railway station is served by Renfe railway lines R1 and R4 which run frequently to and from central Barcelona, taking roughly 25 minutes to and from Plaça Catalunya.

Local buses also connect the town to central Barcelona and since it is in the Barcelona Metropolitan Area, a tourist will be able to find the distinctive yellow taxis in the square where the Avinguda de Barcelona and the Avinguda de València meet.

In addition, the town is served by the C-1413 road to Sabadell.

== Notable people ==
- Agustí Roc Amador (born 1971), ski mountaineer and long-distance runner
- Guillem Ballaz (born 1978), Catalan musician
- Jordi Hurtado (1957–Present), radio and television presenter and voice actor.
- Miquel Carbonell Selva (1854–1896), portrait and landscape painter
- Margarita Xirgu (1888–1969), international actress.
- Luis de Requesens y Zúñiga, 16th-century Spanish diplomat and politician

== Twin towns ==
- Lorca, Spain
- Chinandega, Nicaragua
