= Carbonell Condominium =

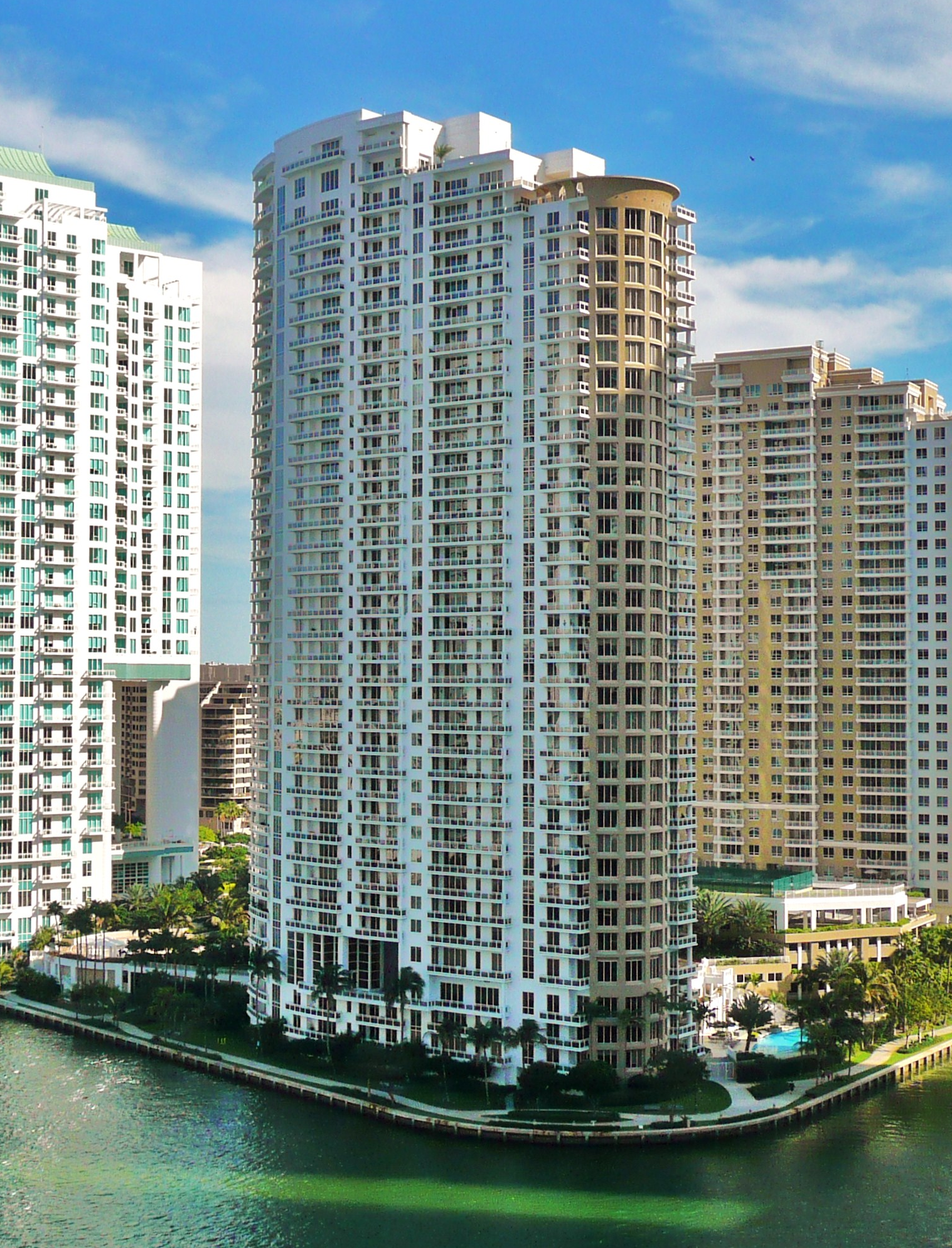
- Interactive map of the Carbonell Condominium area

General information
- Type: Residential
- Location: 901 Brickell Key Boulevard, Miami, Florida, United States
- Coordinates: 25.76925°N 80.18695°W
- Construction started: 2002
- Completed: 2005
- Opening: 2005

Height
- Roof: 410 ft (125 m)

Technical details
- Floor count: 40

Carbonell Condominium is a residential high-rise building located in the Brickell neighborhood of Miami, Florida. The tower is one of the tallest buildings located on Brickell Key, a small island located due east of Brickell at the mouth of the Miami River in Biscayne Bay. Standing at 410 feet (125 metres), the building is currently tied with Two Tequesta Point as the 88th-tallest building in the city. The building's address is 901 Brickell Key Boulevard. Carbonell Condominium houses 40 floors, and was completed in 2005.

== See also ==
- List of tallest buildings in Miami
