= Isabelle Carbonell =

Belgian-Uruguayan-American documentary filmmaker

Isabelle Carbonell is a Belgian-Uruguayan-American award-winning experimental documentary filmmaker, and an assistant film professor at the American University of Paris. She holds a PhD in film from the University of California, Santa Cruz. Her research and practice lie at the intersection of expanded documentary, environmental justice, and the Anthropocene, while striving to develop new visual and sonic approaches and methods to rethink documentary filmmaking and create a "multispecies cinema". Imbued in all her work is the connection between the slow violence of environmental disaster, climate change, bodies of water, more-than-humans, and the future. Carbonell's award-winning films and installation works have been presented in museums, film festivals, and art galleries internationally.

== Academic publications ==
Some of Carbonell's work comprise the following academic publications:

- Interactive Multispecies Documentary Methods (2022)
- Multispecies Cinema in Wretched Waters: The Slow Violence of the Rio Doce Disaster (2021)
- Polyps are a Pluriverse in the Feral Atlas (2020)
- A Story on Story: Camel Racing, Robot Jockeys, and Documentary Filmmaking (2020)
- Coming to Our Senses beyond the Talking-Head: the Panesthetic Documentary Interview (2018)
- The Ethics of Big Data in Big Agriculture (2016)
- Golden Snail Opera: the More-Than-Human-Performance of Friendly Farming on Taiwan's Lanyang Plain (2016)

== Education ==
Carbonell holds a PhD in film from the University of California, Santa Cruz. She also received her B.A. in Residential College Social Science and in Environmental Science from the University of Michigan, Ann Arbor, MI and completed her M.A. in Film and Digital Media at the University of California, Santa Cruz.

== Awards and nominations ==
- Princess Grace Award | Graduate Film Scholarship 2019
- Mellon Dissertation grant Beyond the End of the World 2019-2020
- Best Digital Media Award from Fingerlakes Environmental Film Festival 2019 for The River Runs Red
- Best Ethnographic Interactive Award from the American Anthropological Association 2018 for The River Runs Red
- Honorable Mention for Cultural Horizons Prize 2017 for Golden Snail Opera
- Berkeley Law Human Rights Fellowship Grant 2017 for The River Runs Red
- Georgetown University Environmental Initiative Grant 2017 for The River Runs Red
- Jessica Roy Award 2016 for The River Runs Red
- Best Director Award at IdyllWild Film Festival 2015 for Trashborn
- Best Editing Award at the BAWIFV Film Festival 2013 for Baffle Their Minds With Bullsh*t
- World Health Organization in Kampala, Uganda. Honorable mention Vietnam and Public Health 2008
- James H. Robertson Award for Photography and Studio Arts, Residential College University of Michigan 2007

== Film Festivals ==
Year	Title	Festival
	[this is an incomplete list of screenings]	
2022	When Monsters Walked the Earth	Athens International Film Festival
2020	The Blessed Assurance	Georgia Documentary Film Festival
2020	The Blessed Assurance	Athens International Film Festival
2019	The Blessed Assurance	Big Sky Documentary Film Festival
2019	River Runs Red	Rio de Janeiro WebDoc
2019	River Runs Red	Seoul Webdoc
2018	River Runs Red	Society for Visual Anthropology Film and Media Festival
2015	Trashborn	IdyllWild Film Festival
2014	Trashborn	Documentary Film Festival in Dominican Republic
2014	Trashborn	Frozen River Film Festival
2013	Trashborn	Habana Film Festival (El Festival del Nuevo Cine Latinoamericano)
2013	Baffle Their Minds with Bullsh*t, Kerry Leigh	BAWIFV Film Festival in San Francisco
2013	Baffle Their Minds with Bullsh*t, Kerry Leigh	Santa Monica Film Festival
2013	Baffle Their Minds with Bullsh*t, Kerry Leigh	College Town Film Festival
2013	Baffle Their Minds with Bullsh*t, Kerry Leigh	Annapolis Film Festival
2013	Baffle Their Minds with Bullsh*t, Kerry Leigh	Bethesda Film Festival
2012	Baffle Their Minds with Bullsh*t, Kerry Leigh	DC Shorts
2012	Baffle Their Minds with Bullsh*t, Kerry Leigh	DC Independent Film Festival
2011	Water Warriors	Water Rights Film Festival of Japan
2008	Palindrome	Ohio Independent Film Festival
2008	Mexico: Chasing the American Dream	New Filmmakers Latino Anthology
2008	Palindrome	Athens International Film and Video Festival
2008	Palindrome	Kansas City Jubilee Film Festival
2008	Palindrome	Washington DC Independent Film Festival
2007	Water Warriors	Environmental Water Festival, Japan
2007	Palindrome	Film Farm X Festival
2007	Mexico:Chasing the American Dream	Gasparilla Film Festival

== Filmography ==
Year	Title	Distributor
2006	Mexico: Chasing the American Dream	Izaca Productions
2006	NGO Crossing Borders in Vietnam	NGO Crossing Borders
2007	Palindrome	Izaca Productions
2007	Vietnam: Three Short Poems	Izaca Productions
2007	Water Warriors	Izaca Productions
2007	Shakespeare's Sonnet 2	Izaca Productions
2009	Books Unbound: The Heritage Library in Qatar	Carnegie Mellon University & Qatar Foundation
2010	Zubarah	University of Copenhagen & Qatar Museums Authority
2010	Miki Flow: Cuban Hip Hop	Izaca Productions
2010	Tango in Jerash, Jordan	Izaca Productions
2010	6 Day in Kazakhstan	iCarnegie
2011	Beirut International Tango Festival	Izaca Productions
2011	Trashborn	Passion River Distribution
2011	Mi Aldea Mi Langosta: My Village, My Lobster	Nomading Films
2009/2012	SHOOT.EDIT.SHARE, Experimental Ethnographic Shorts	Izaca Productions
2012	Baffle Their Minds With Bullsh*t, Kerry Leigh	Izaca Productions
2012	The Souk of Aleppo	Izaca Productions
2012	Nepal: Prayer Wheels	Izaca Productions
2013	Las Palomas, Me Encantan (I Love Pigeons)	Izaca Productions
2016/2019	The Golden Snail Opera	Cultural Anthropology
2018	The River Runs Red	Izaca Productions
2018	The Blessed Assurance	Izaca Productions
2019	The Camel Race	Izaca Productions
2020	The Mississippi Multiverse	Izaca Productions / HKW Berlin
2020	Polyps are a Pluriverse	Izaca Productions / Feral Atlas
2021	A Mirror of the Earth	Izaca Productions
2021	A Mirror of the Cosmos	Izaca Productions / Princess Grace Awards
2021	When Monsters Walked the Earth	Izaca Productions / Imagine Science FF

== Installations ==
Year	Work Exhibited	Organization
		[this is an incomplete list]
2019	Songs of Mud - audio	Poetics and Politics Symposium / University of California, Santa Cruz
2016	Tomo/veillance - audio	University of California, Santa Cruz Underwater Concert
