= Resistencia Biennial International Sculptures Contest =

International Sculpting Competition In Argentina

The Resistencia Biennial International Sculptures Contest is an international event in Resistencia, Argentina held since 1988. Sponsored by UNESCO, it gathers sculptors from around the world, who in the lapse of a week must sculpt their pieces in open air and in front of visitors. The sculptures are destined for being sited in the city as cultural heritage. Resistencia, called the City of Sculptures, has more than 530 sculptures placed in open spaces. The event is complemented with art seminars, concerts, and other cultural activities.

== History ==
In November 1989, after the first contest was held, local artist Fabriciano Gómez established the Fundación Urunday, an organization that would organize the contests from then on.

== Gallery ==
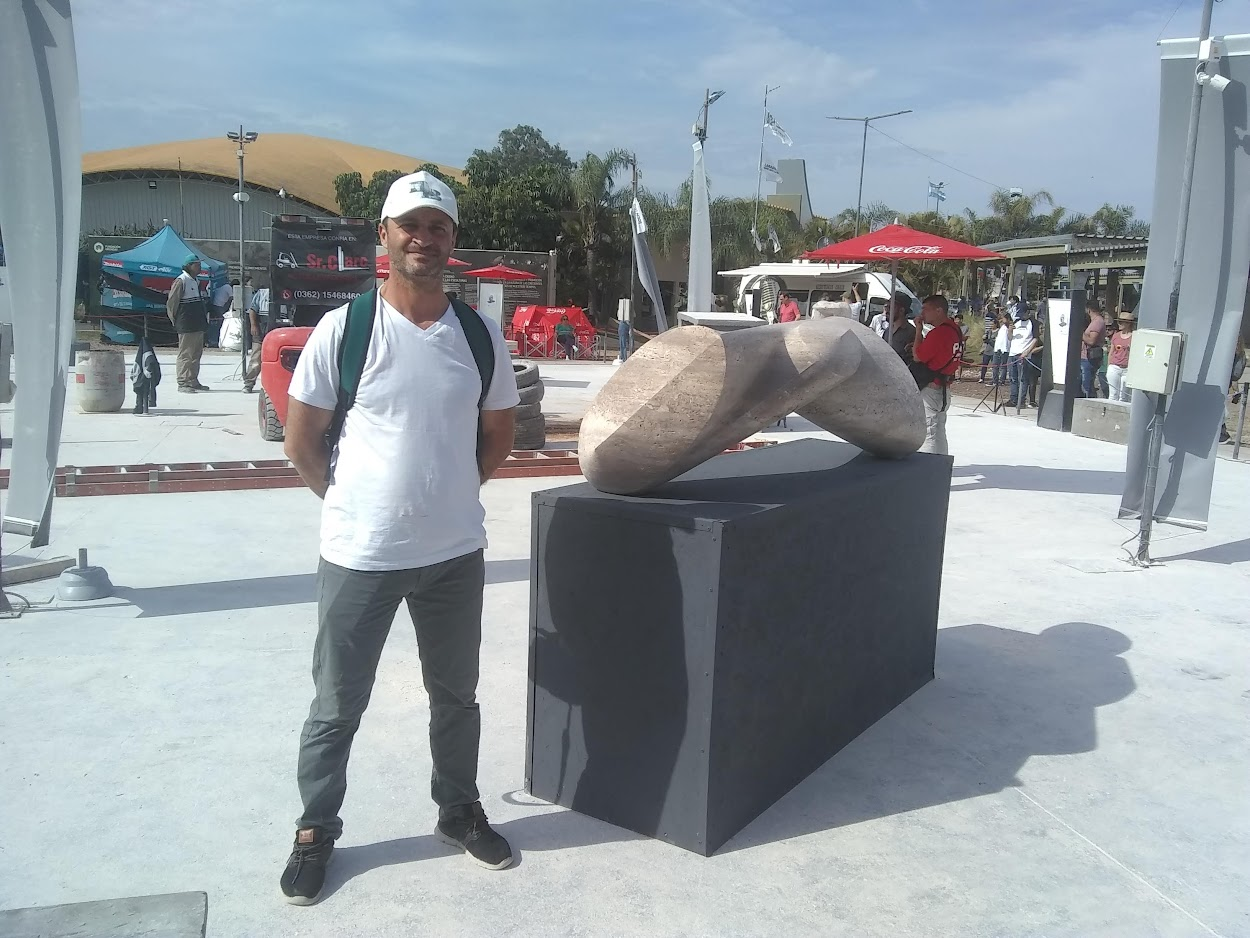
Romanian artist Petre Virgiliu Mogosanu and his work, winner of the 2022 contest

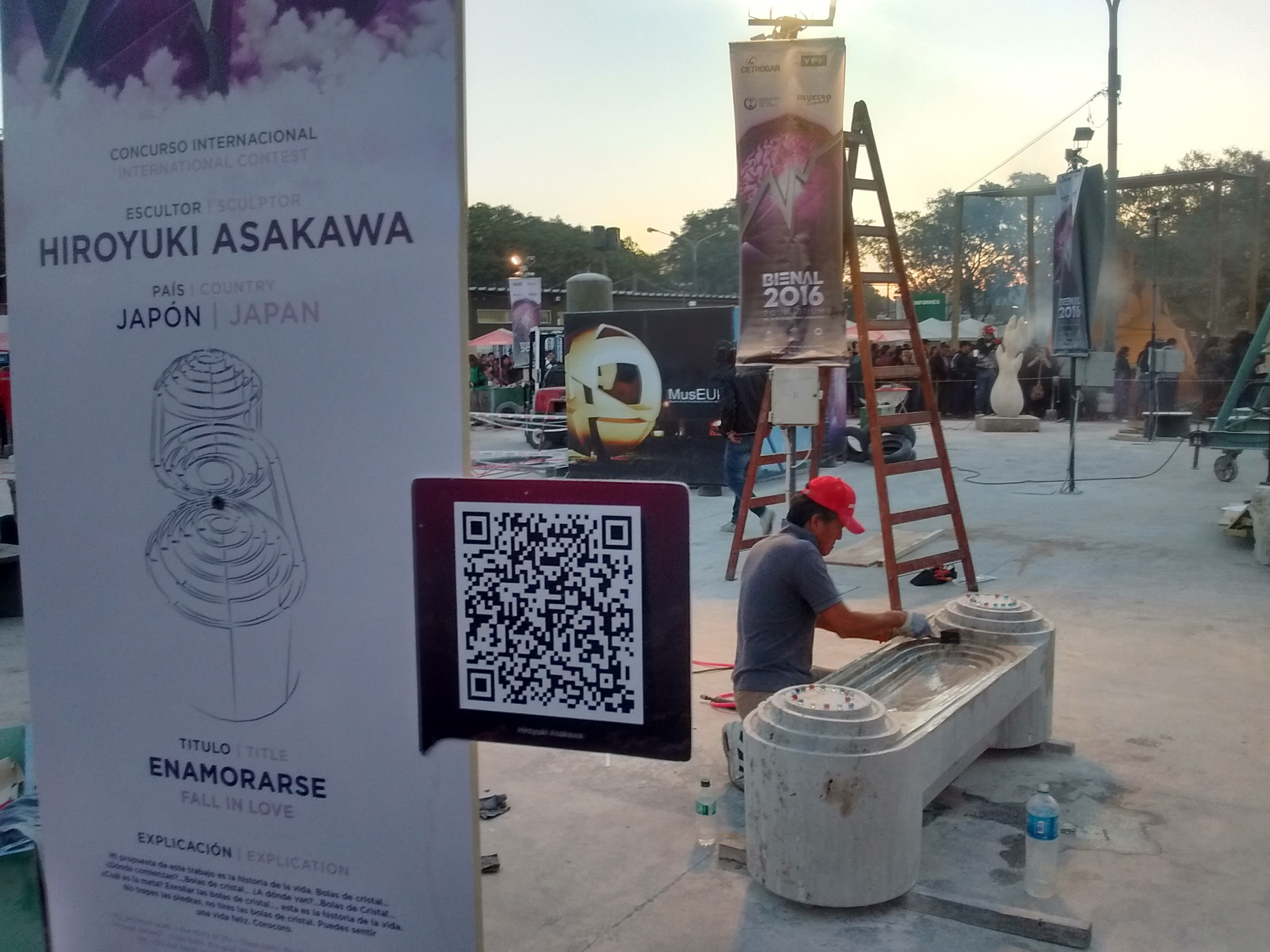
Japanese artist Hiroyuki Asakawa at the 2016 contest

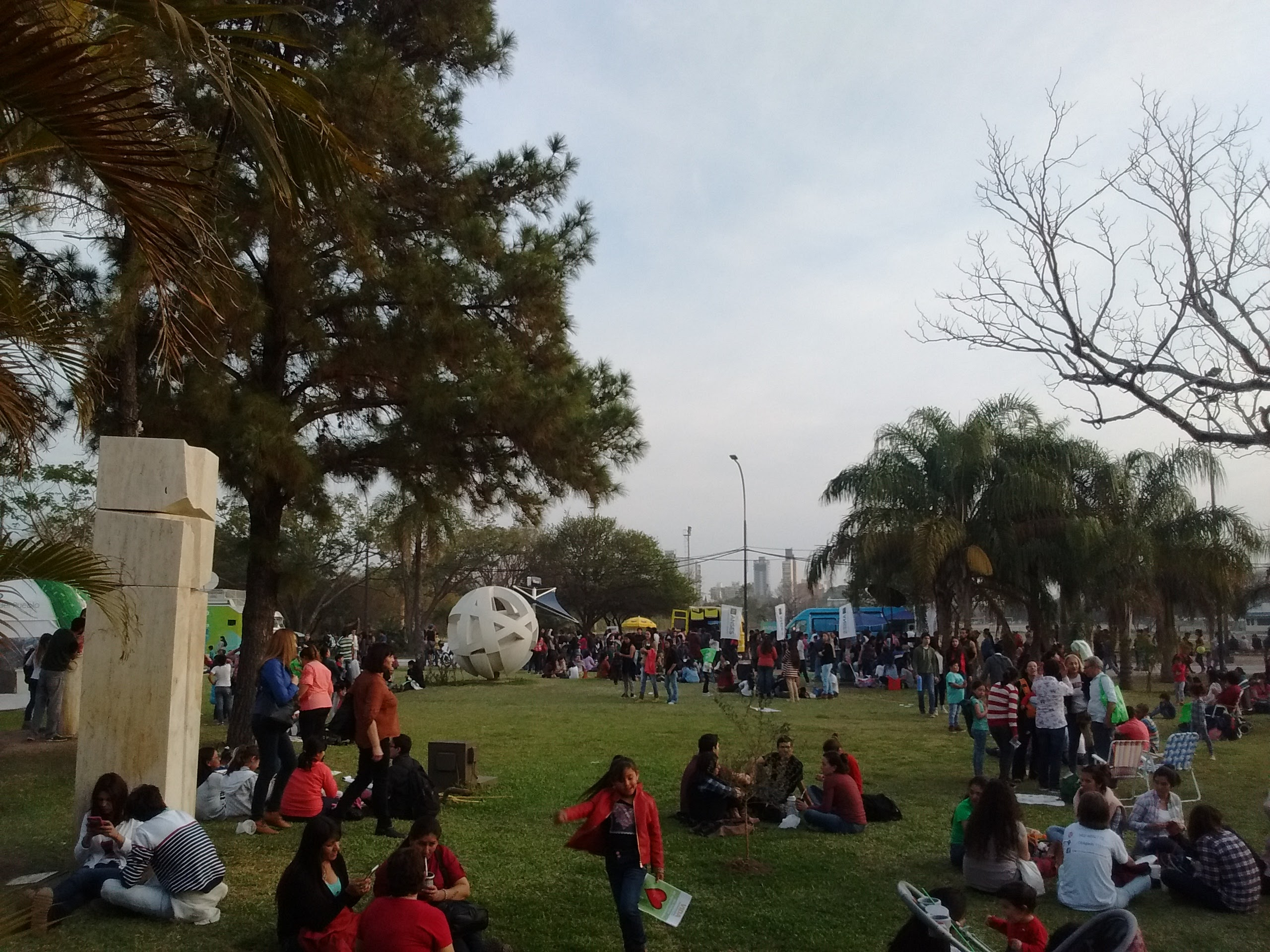
Sculptures from several contests at a crowded 2 de Febrero park
