= Guillem Ballaz =

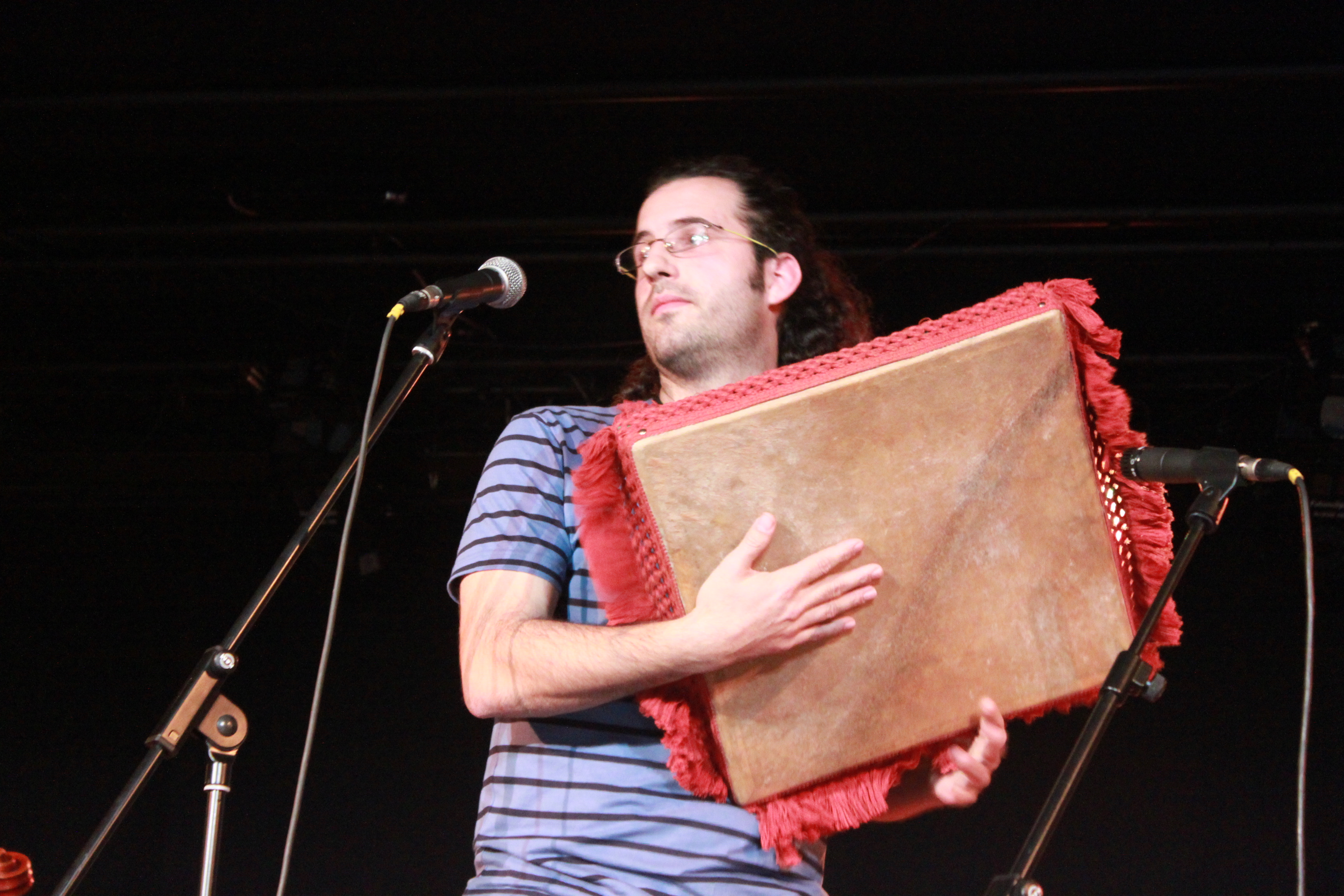

Background information
- Birth name: Guillem Ballaz i Bogunyà
- Born: 17 August 1978 (age 47); Molins de Rei, Catalonia, Spain
- Origin: Molins de Rei, near Barcelona
- Genres: Folk, singer-songwriter
- Occupation(s): Musician, songwriter, record producer
- Instrument: Vocals
- Website: Official website

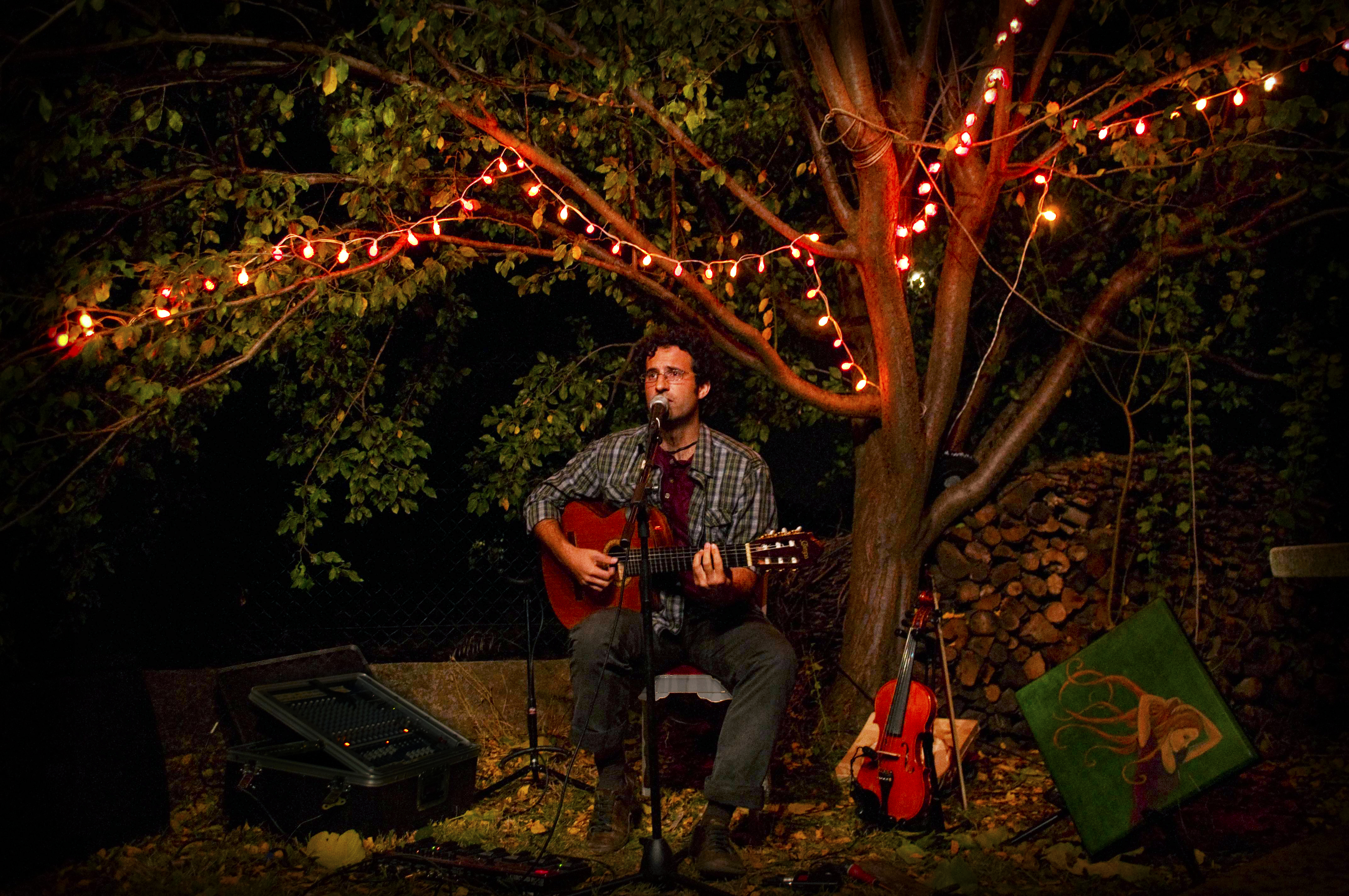
Guillem Ballaz performing in Pyrenees

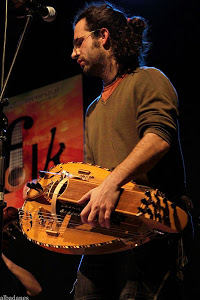
Guillem Ballaz performing in Barcelona

Guillem Ballaz i Bogunyà (born 17 August 1978) is a Catalan musician who has focused his work on Catalan traditional music. First, through groups like Sol I Serena and later under his name in a more personal project. He has also made an important task studying and revitalizing the Catalan square tambourine "pandero quadrat" and its tunes and Catalan folk violin.

== Biography ==
Guillem Ballaz was born in Molins de Rei, 10 km from Barcelona. He is the son of Jesus Ballaz Zabalza, Navarre, and Maria Angels Bogunyà Carulla, Catalan. His musical training began at an early age with the violin. Later, he studied industrial engineering in electronics, but even before graduating, he opted for a career in professional music. Their music always seeks the border between tradition and modernity, performing around Europe (France, UK, Italy, Belgium, Spain, Portugal...). He also teaches in Aula de Musica Tradicional de Salt and Music School of Besalu.

Ballaz has investigated the Catalan square tambourine "pandero quadrat" and its tunes for ten years. During this time, he published articles in specialized journals and conducted workshops and seminars to explain the importance of this tradition in Catalan society over the past five centuries. Thanks to this, today's square tambourine Catalan and his tunes are back alive. Ballaz sings with his square tambourine from modes scenarios to major cultural centers like the Palau de la Música Catalana. This work culminated with the presentation of monographic work "Projecte Pandero" in December 2012.

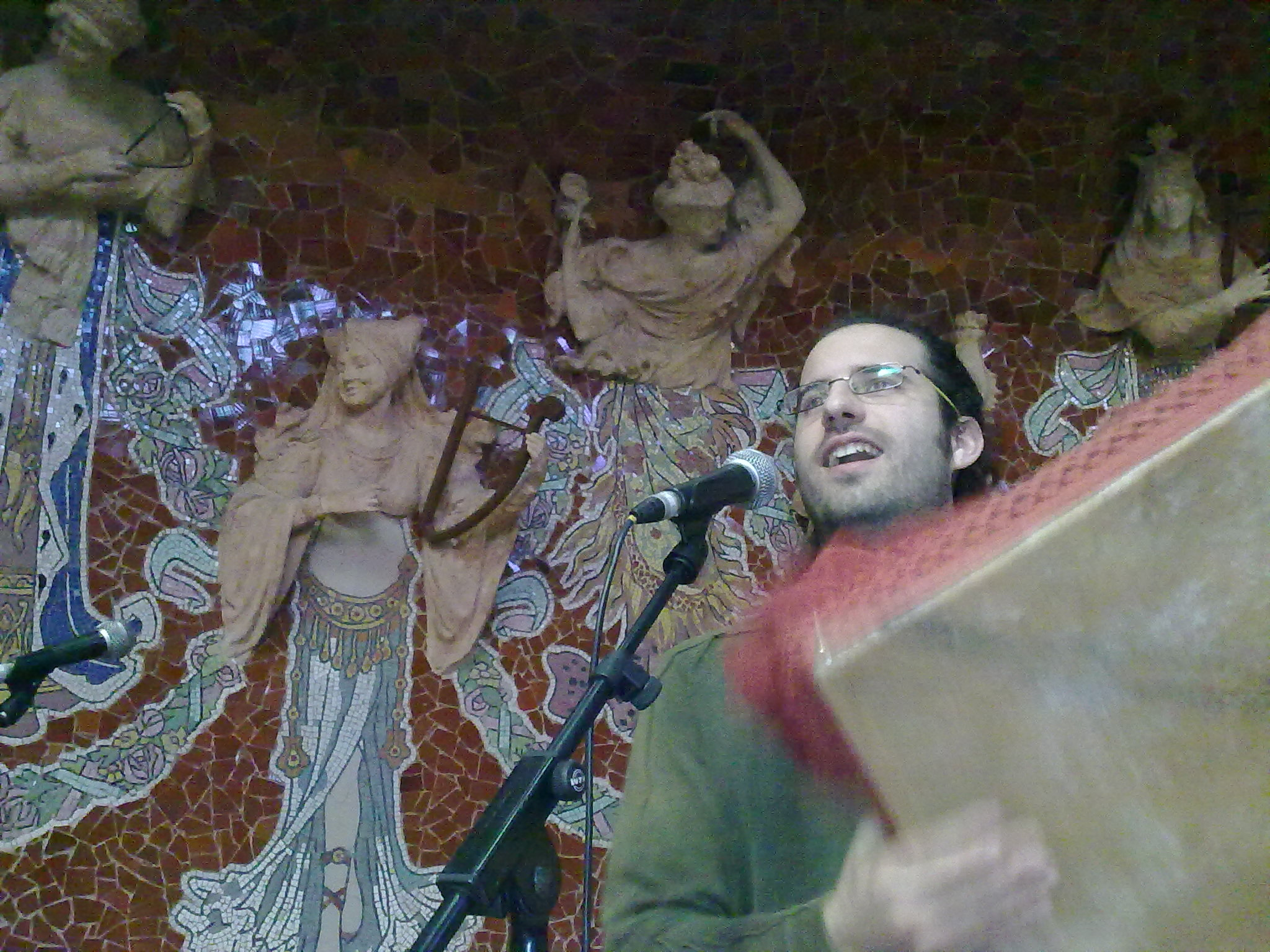
Guillem Ballaz performing in the Palau de la Música Catalana

== Discography ==
- Disc de Butxaca (2003)
- Grapat de ruda (2007)
- Un segon (2009)
- Projecte Pandero (2012)

Also appears on

- 19è Festival Internacional de Folk Tradicionarius (2006)
- 20è Festival Internacional de Folk Tradicionarius (2007)
- Altaveu Frontera – 19è Festival de música Altaveu (2007)
- Llotja de música urbana de Vilareal (2007)
- 10a Mediterrània- Fira d'espectacles d'arrel tradicional de Manresa (2007)
- World music from Catalonia (2009)
- Catalan Arts (2013)
