= Slow Violence and the Environmentalism of the Poor =

2011 novel by Rob Nixon

- Author: Rob Nixon
- Language: English
- Genre: Environmental Studies
- Publisher: Harvard University Press
- Publication date: 2011
- Publication place: United States
- Media type: Print (Paperback)
- Pages: 353 pp
- ISBN: 9780674072343
- OCLC: 754842110

Slow Violence and the Environmentalism of the Poor (2011) is a book by South African professor Rob Nixon. The book explores the concept of slow violence, where the environmental impacts escalated by capitalism affects marginalized classes are often ignored.

He focuses on issues from the poor global South, examining writer-activists involved in such issues and strategies they use to bring attention to the cause.

== Reception ==
=== Awards ===
The book has received several awards. These include the Harold Margaret Sprout and Transdisciplinary humanities Book Award and the American Book Awards in 2012. In addition, the ASLE Scholarly Book Award was given in 2013.
