= Peris Carbonell =

Spanish painter (born 1957)

Antonio Peris Carbonell
- Born: November 8, 1957 (age 68); Valencia, Spain
- Occupations: Painter, Sculptor, Artist
- Notable work: Museum Peris Carbonell, Palma de Mallorca, Spain and Franciscan Museum, Roma, Italy
- Awards: Royal Order of Knights of Santa Maria de El Puig, Spain

Antonio Peris Carbonell (born 1957, Valencia) is a Spanish painter and sculptor .

Peris Carbonell has made more than 60 solo exhibitions and 30 permanent exhibitions in Europe, including the Peris Carbonell Museum opened to the public in July 2012 in Palma de Mallorca, Spain. The permanent exhibition displays a collection of paintings and sculptures created by the artist since 1999. Thirty books have been published about the artist and his artwork. Peris Carbonell frequently travels to the United States of America, being especially inspired in his artworks by the urban landscapes of New York City.

== Career ==
When he was 12 years old, he painted one of his first works: La Caravana. He studied drawing at the Escuela de Artes y Oficios de Valencia (Valencia School of Arts) and, in 1976, was admitted to the San Carlos Fine Arts School, also in Valencia. After 1978, Peris Carbonell participated in several national art competitions and won a total of seven first prizes, including one for sculpture. He worked and studied art at museums in France, Italy, the Netherlands, Egypt and England. The first book about his work, Peris Carbonell, Obras 1976–1987, was published in 1988 in four languages. He starts to incorporate symbolism, graphic and calligraphic elements in the images. In April 1990, the artist and his family traveled to Rome for a semi-private audience with Pope John Paul II. Peris Carbonell presented the Pontiff an oil painting of The Face of Christ during His Passion, which was created without a model and based entirely on an expression of artist's deep "inner feeling". Peris Carbonell belongs to the long line of great Iberian artists and is the maximum exponent of the contemporary Spanish mystic expressionism.

=== Peris Carbonell Museum ===
The Peris Carbonell Museum was opened to the public in July 2012 in Palma de Mallorca, Spain. The permanent exhibition displays a collection of 100 paintings and sculptures created by the artist since 1999.

== Paintings ==
Antonio Gascó (PhD in History of the Art, Professor and Academic of the Real Academia de Bellas Artes de San Fernando, Madrid, Spain and Real Academia de Bellas Artes de San Carlos, Valencia, Spain) once wrote about Peris Carbonell's artworks:

"Peris Carbonell`s paintings are characterized by a sea of colors, always changing and full of movement. They are like agitated waves moving with the wind, the light that emerges from the dawn. In Peris Carbonell`s paintings, the expressionism is mystic, warm and agitated. His cypresses paintings are like flames of candles that never extinguish; in his beaches, the sun is defeated by the strength and light of the powerful color; in his religious scenes, the pictures and forms are overcome by an imminent and supernatural strength of the holiness".
