= Rob Nixon =

South African author

Rob Nixon is a South African author.

Nixon received a B.A. from Rhodes University, South Africa, in 1978. He was awarded an M.A. in English from the University of Iowa in 1982, and a Ph.D. in English from Columbia University in 1989. Nixon teaches environmental studies, postcolonial studies, creative nonfiction, African literature, world literature, and twentieth century British literature at Princeton University. His book "Slow Violence and the Environmentalism of the Poor" was honored with four awards: an American Book Award, the Harold & Margaret Sprout Award of the Environmental Studies Section of the International Studies Association, the 2012 Transdisciplinary Humanities Book Award from the Institute for Humanities Research at Arizona State University, and the 2013 ASLE Scholarly Book Award.

== Books ==
- London Calling: V.S. Naipaul, Postcolonial Mandarin (Oxford)
- Homelands, Harlem and Hollywood: South African Culture and the World Beyond (Routledge)
- Dreambirds: The Natural History of a Fantasy (Picador)
- Slow Violence and the Environmentalism of the Poor (Harvard)
