= Eddy Carbonnelle =

Belgian field hockey player

Personal information
- Nationality: Belgian
- Born: 23 October 1926 Tournai, Belgium
- Died: 23 January 2004 (aged 77)

Sport
- Sport: Field hockey

Eddy Carbonnelle (23 October 1926 – 23 January 2004) was a Belgian field hockey player. He competed in the men's tournament at the 1960 Summer Olympics.
