= Ponç Carbonell =

Ponç Carbonell (Latin Pontius; died c. 1320) was a Catalan Franciscan scholar who also served as confessor to the Kings of Aragon.
