= Pere Miquel Carbonell =

Catalan historian and writer

Pere Miquel Carbonell (1434–1517) was a Catalan historian, humanist, notary, calligrapher, poet and writer. It has been argued by some historians that Carbonell was the first editor of the Chronicle of the Kings of Aragon and the Counts of Barcelona, but a review of the dates of the appendix should that this was impossible as it predated Carbonell.
