= Guidette Carbonell =

French artist

- Born: Marguerite Sophie Caroline Carbonell; 23 January 1910; Meudon, France
- Died: 22 April 2008 (aged 98); Bioussac, France
- Occupations: Artist, ceramist, weaver
- Spouse: Emmanuel Auricoste (m. 1938; divorced)
- Children: 2: Marianne Auricoste, Isabelle Auricoste
- Relatives: Hubert Tonka (son-in-law)

Guidette Carbonell (23 January 1910 – 22 April 2008) was a French artist, first known for her ceramic works, including bowls, plates, tiles, lamps, and fantasy animal figures. She also made mixed-media paintings, collages and tapestries.

== Early life ==
Marguerite Sophie Caroline Carbonell, called "Guidette", was born in Meudon, France, the daughter of Charles Carbonell and the former Arminia Babaïan. Her father was a Catalan doctor; her mother was an artist born to Armenian parents in Tbilisi. Guidette Carbonell studied art in Paris with André Lhote and Roger Bissière, and with Othon Friesz.

== Career ==
Carbonell exhibited small enamel pieces in 1928 at the Société des artistes décorateurs. She designed fountains and murals for the French government in the 1930s. She was a longtime collaborator with decorator Jacques Adnet. She became a member of the Salon des artistes décorateurs in 1945. She was named a chevalier des Arts et des Lettres in 1957. In the 1950s, she worked on large mixed-media friezes involving embedded pebbles, fibers, glass, pottery, and other objects. Later in her career, she worked in tapestry and collage, often with bird themes.

The Meudon Art and History Museum showed her "harpies" (her name for her fantasy winged creatures in various media) in 1988. In 2007, there was a retrospective of her works at the Musée des Arts Décoratifs, Paris. The retrospective show traveled to Roubaix and Rouen, and a monograph about Carbonell's work was published in 2007. A short documentary film about Carbonell was released in 2009.

== Personal life ==
Carbonell married fellow artist Emmanuel Auricoste (1908–1995) in 1938. They had two daughters, Isabelle and Marianne, before they divorced. Her daughter Marianne Auricoste is an actress and speaker. Her other daughter, Isabelle Auricoste, became an illustrator and an elected municipal official, and married urban planner Hubert Tonka. Guidette Carbonell died in 2008, aged 98 years, in Bioussac.
