= André Carbonnelle =

Belgian field hockey player

Personal information
- Nationality: Belgian
- Born: 3 January 1923 Tournai, Belgium
- Died: 30 November 2015 (aged 92) Uccle, Belgium

Sport
- Sport: Field hockey

André Carbonnelle (3 January 1923 – 30 November 2015) was a Belgian field hockey player. He competed at the 1956 Summer Olympics and the 1960 Summer Olympics.
