= Miguel Ángel Carbonell =

Argentine footballer (born 1972)

Personal information
- Date of birth: 23 July 1972 (age 54)
- Place of birth: Resistencia, Argentina
- Position: Forward

Senior career*
Years	Team	Apps	(Gls)
1993–1994	San Telmo		
1994	Arturo Fernández		
1995	Ñublense		
1995–1997	San Telmo	13	(1)
1997	Cobreloa		
1998–2005	San Telmo		
- * Club domestic league appearances and goals

Miguel Ángel Carbonell (born 23 July 1972) is an Argentine former professional footballer who played as a forward for clubs of Argentina and Chile.
