= Ignatius Carbonnelle =

Belgian Jesuit and mathematician

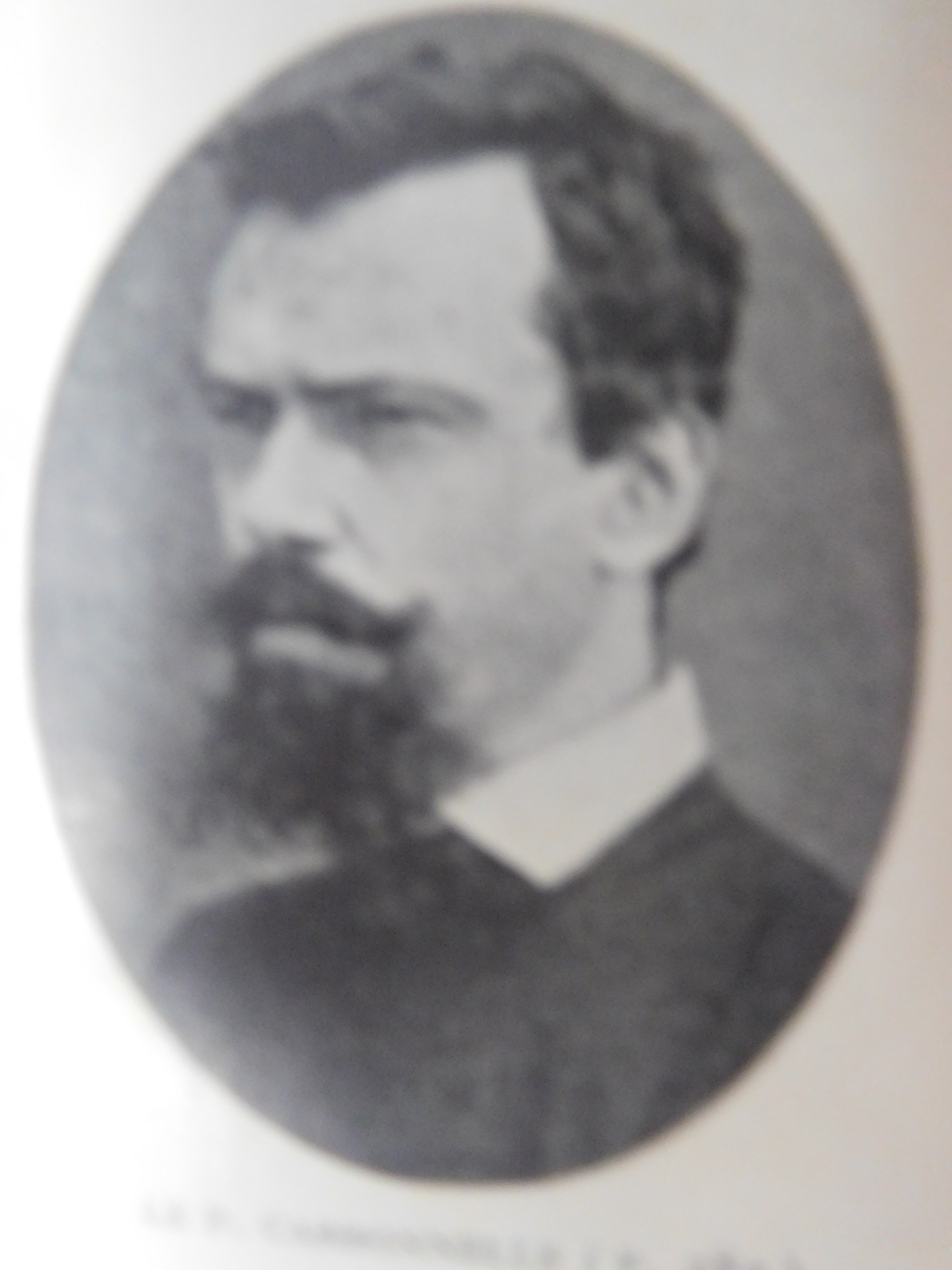
Ignatius Carbonnelle

Ignatius Carbonnelle (1829–1889) was a Jesuit, mathematician and the founder of the Scientific Society of Brussels.
