= Miquel Carbonell Selva =

Spanish painter

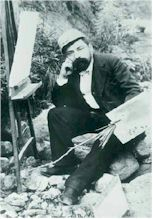
Miquel Carbonell Selva (date unknown)

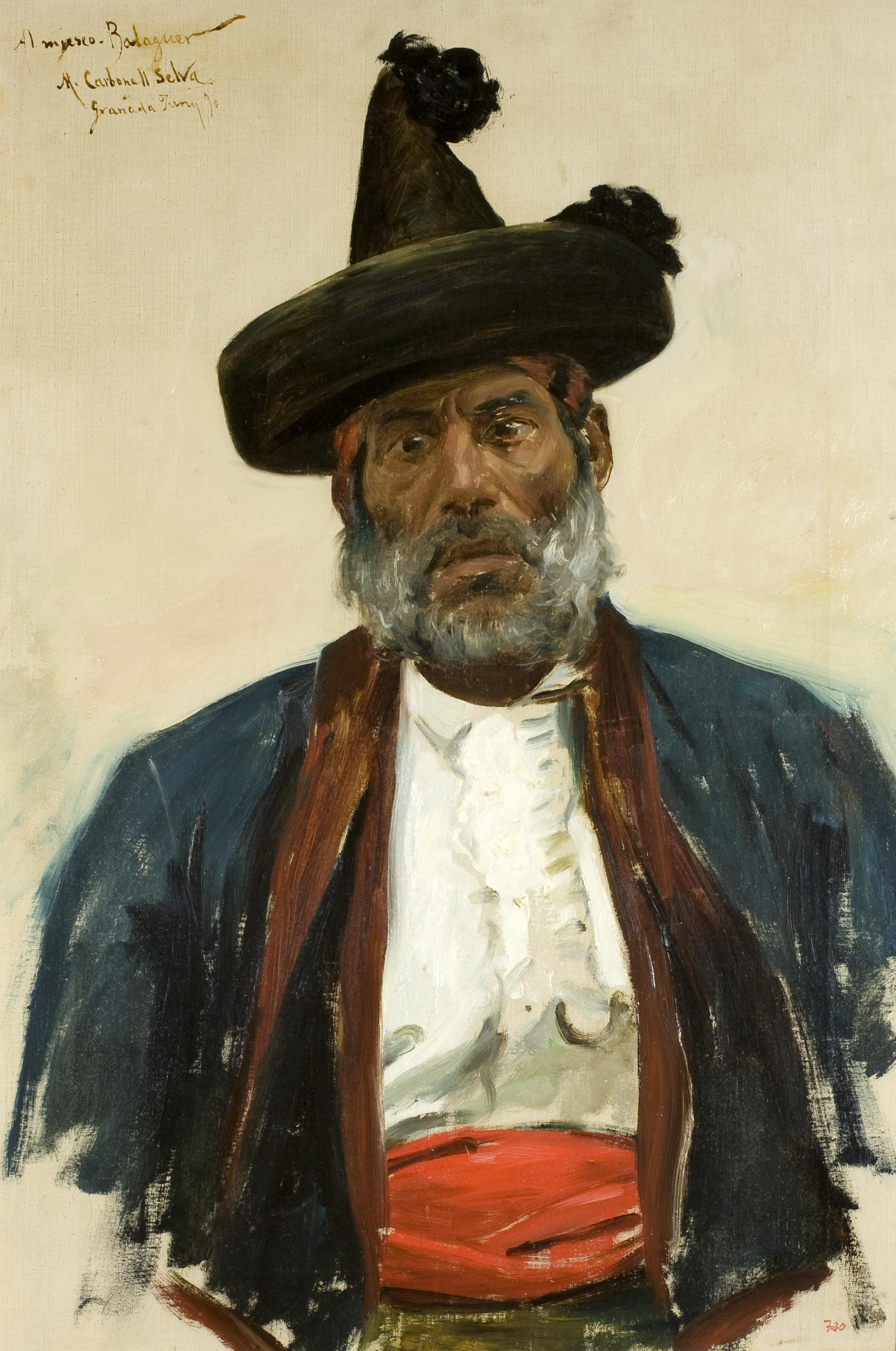
Portrait of Mariano Fernández, known as "Chorrojumo, King of the Gypsies". (1890)

Miquel Carbonell i Selva (23 July 1854, Molins de Rei – 14 May 1896, Barcelona) was a Catalan painter, muralist and poet. He is especially known for his realistic portraits and landscapes of the area around the Llobregat River.

== Biography ==
When he was only ten, he developed a tumor on his leg, which kept him bed-ridden for a year and caused permanent damage that required the use of a cane. At the age of thirteen, he was apprenticed to a painter in Barcelona. Two years later, he was enrolled at the Escola de la Llotja, where he studied with Antoni Caba.

His first exhibition was in 1872, at the Society of Fine Arts. He completed his studies there in 1875, having received several awards for composition, color and perspective.

He continued his studies in Rome, thanks to a stipend provided by Ferran Puig i Gibert, a prominent financier. In 1880, he moved to Madrid, although he still spent time in Barcelona and his hometown, where he was married in 1882. While in Madrid, he also did interior decoration.

In 1889, he joined with several other Catalan artists and went to Paris, where they participated in the Exposition Universelle. During this time, he also began publishing poetry in Lo Gay Saber ("the gay science", the lyric poetry of the troubadours) and the Calendari Català.

In 1902, the Municipal Council in his hometown voted to name a street in his honor.
