= Tequesta Point =

Residential complex in Miami, Florida

Three Tequesta Point
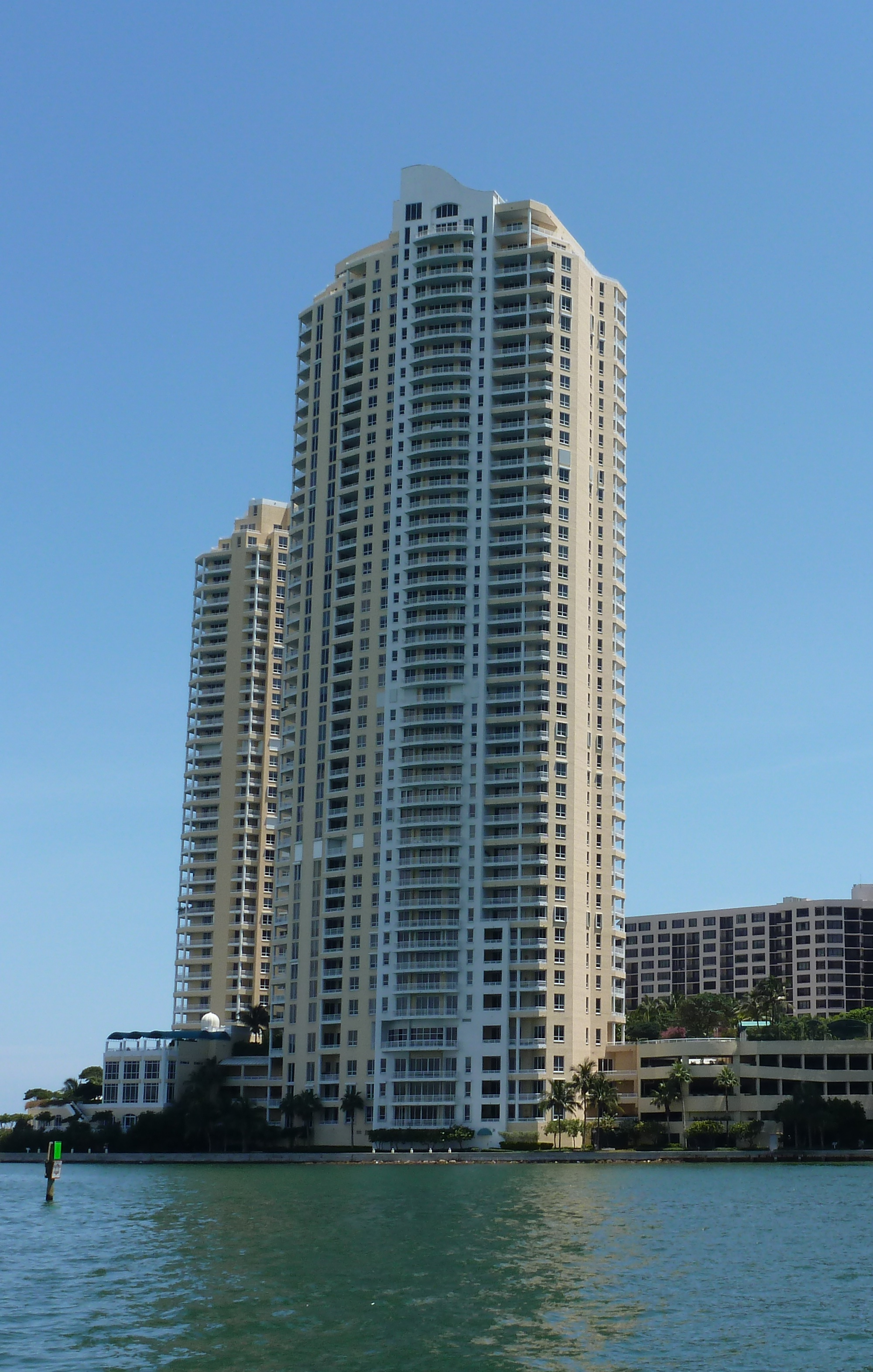
- Interactive map of the Three Tequesta Point area

General information
- Type: Residential
- Location: 848 Brickell Key Drive, Miami, Florida, United States
- Construction started: 1998
- Completed: 2001
- Opening: 2001

Height
- Roof: 480 ft (150 m)

Technical details
- Floor count: 46

Design and construction
- Architects: J. Scott Architecture, PA

Two Tequesta Point
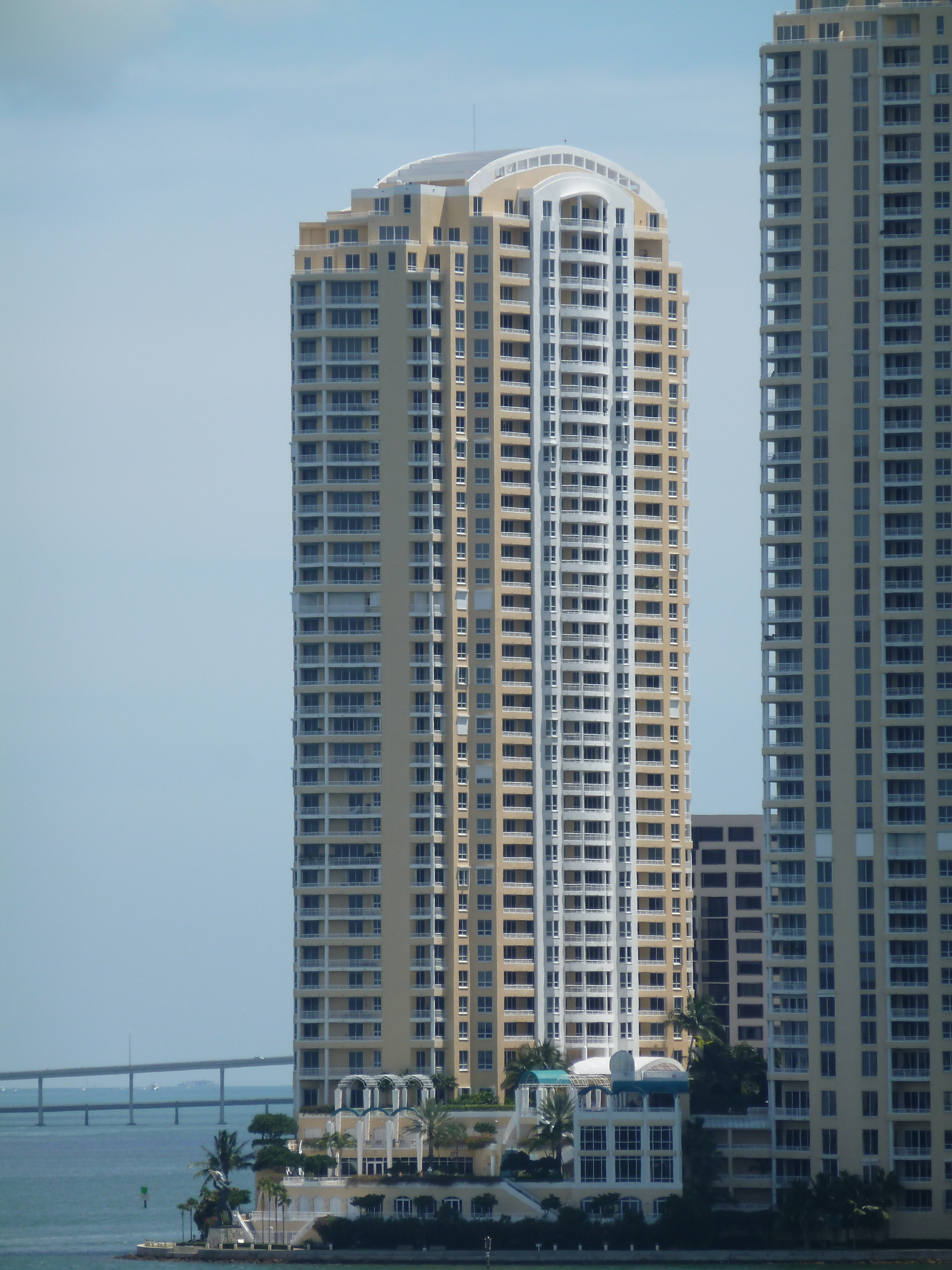
- Interactive map of the Two Tequesta Point area

General information
- Type: Residential
- Location: 808 Brickell Key Drive, Miami, Florida, United States
- Coordinates: 25.7694°N 80.1833°W
- Construction started: 1996
- Completed: 1999
- Opening: 1999

Height
- Roof: 410 ft (120 m)

Technical details
- Floor count: 40

Design and construction
- Architects: J. Scott Architecture, PA

One Tequesta Point
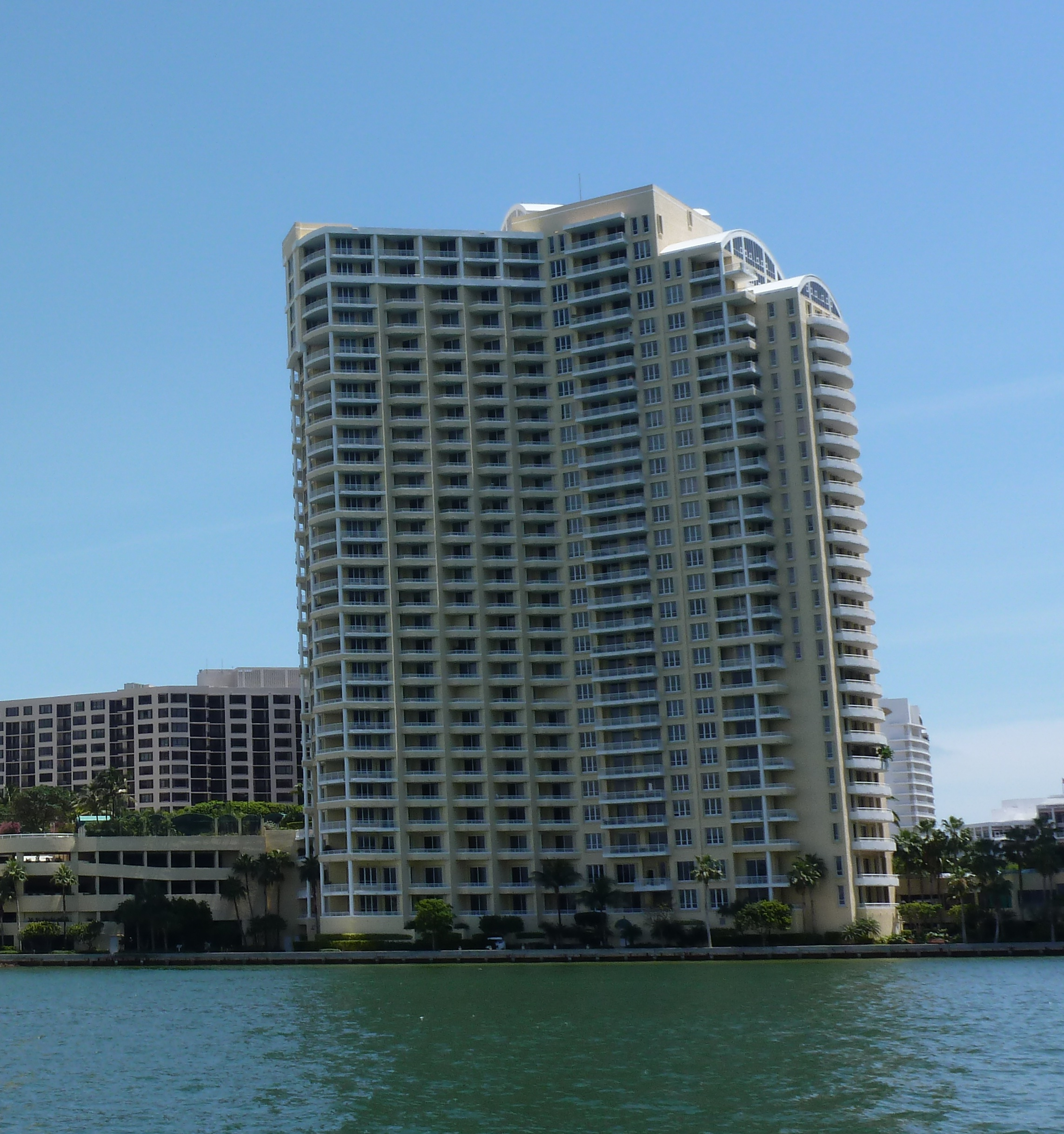
- Interactive map of the One Tequesta Point area

General information
- Type: Residential
- Location: 888 Brickell Key Drive, Miami, Florida, United States
- Construction started: 1993
- Completed: 1995
- Opening: 1995

Technical details
- Floor count: 30

Design and construction
- Architects: J. Scott Architecture, PA

Tequesta Point is a complex of residential high-rises in Downtown Miami, Florida, United States. It consists of three skyscraper buildings located on Brickell Key, an urban island to the east of the Central Business District. Three Tequesta Point, the tallest of the three, was completed in 2001. It is 480 ft (146 m) tall, and has 46 floors. Two Tequesta Point, the central building of the complex, was completed in 1999. It is 410 ft (125 m) tall, and has 40 floors. One Tequesta Point, the original building of the complex, was built in 1995. It contains 30 floors and is at the northern end of Brickell Key. The buildings, when opened, were some of the tallest Miami had to offer; however, since the start of the building boom in the early 2000s, many skyscrapers which are much taller than the Tequesta Point buildings have been built. Nevertheless, because the complex is located directly on Biscayne Bay, the buildings can still be seen from Miami Beach and from boats in the bay.

== See also ==
- List of tallest buildings in Miami
