= Miami Rock Ridge =

Geological formation in Florida, USA

Coordinates: 25°44′52.962″N 80°12′20.5308″W

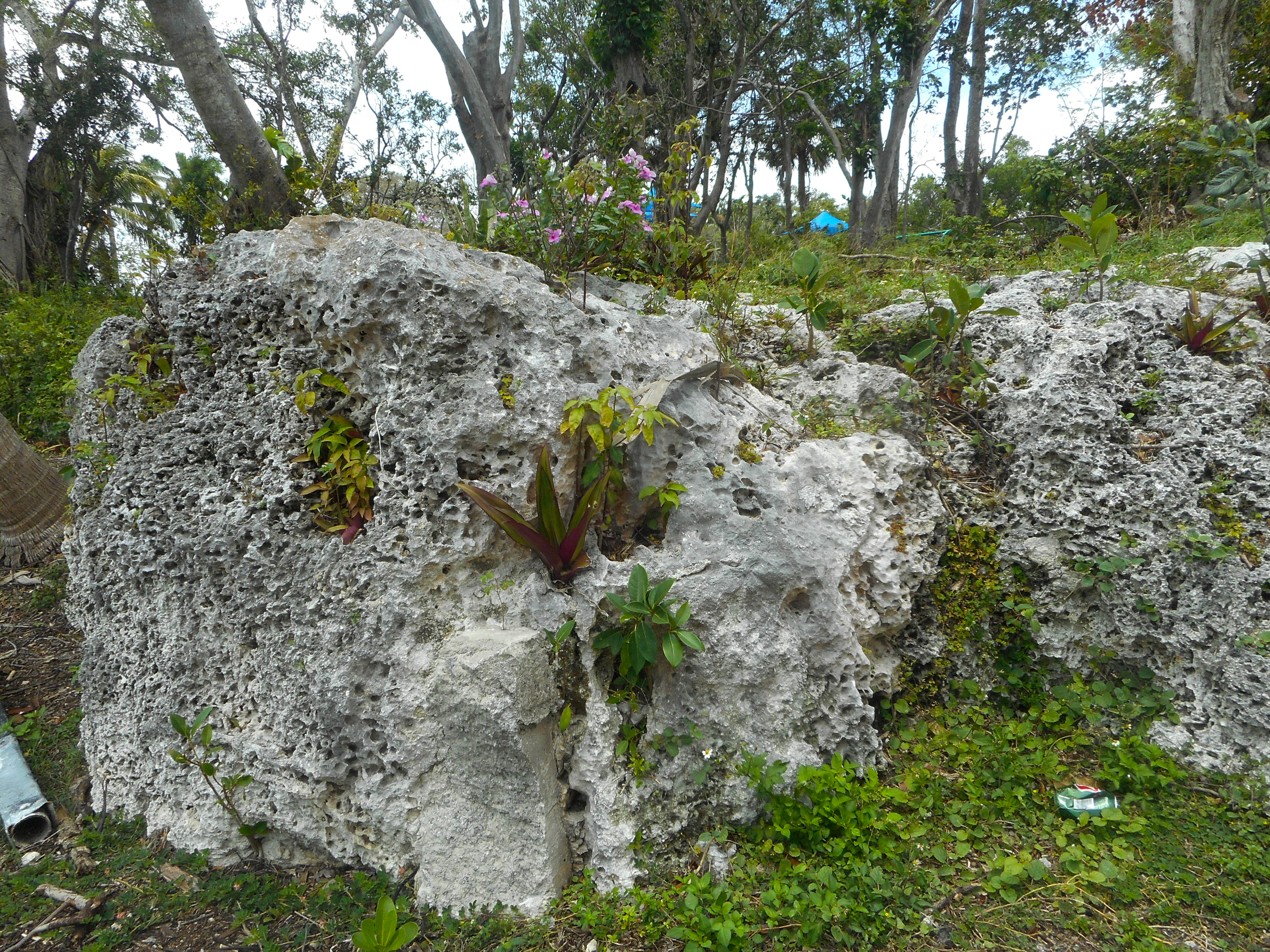
Rock outcrop closeup

The Miami Rock Ridge is an oolitic, continuous outcrop of limestone, part of the Miami Formation, which formerly covered a large extent of southernmost South Florida; as part of an ecosystem it formed portions of the Everglades. Rising 7 to 8.6 m (23 to 28 ft) above sea level, it ranges from northern Miami-Dade County—the approximate latitude of North Miami Beach—southward to the upper Florida Keys and southwestward into Everglades National Park, creating a karst-dominated landscape. The ridge is of Late Pleistocene origin. A series of tidal channels, dubbed transverse glades, formed within valleys in the ridge and acted as outlets for freshwater from the Everglades, thereby modifying the estuarine environment of Biscayne Bay. (Note: One of these glades enclosed the Miami River, a section of which sported a 6-foot-2 1/2-inch (1.892 m) waterfall and 450-foot-long (140 m) rapids until 1908, when it was progressively bypassed by the Miami Canal and partly dredged.) One of the few areas above pre-drainage sea level, the Miami Rock Ridge was heavily exploited for agriculture and real estate.

The Miami Rock Ridge has previously been called the "Everglade Keys" or "Everglades Keys". In 1930, the early 20th century botanist, John Kunkel Small, described the Everglade Keys as "a chain of islands enclosed by the southern portion of the Everglades, except where some of the islands come in contact with the upper part of Bay Biscayne."

== Long Pine Key ==
Map of southern Miami-Dade County showing the Miami Rock Ridge south of Miami (in yellow), including Long Pine Key

Long Pine Key is an extension of the Miami Rock Ridge beyond the Taylor Slough. It extends about 25 kilometres (16 mi) along an east-west line, has an area of about 8,000 hectares (20,000 acres), and a maximum elevation of about 5 metres (16 ft) above sea level. It is the largest upland area in the Everglades National Park, and forms the southern rim of the Everglades basin. As with the rest of the Miami Rock Ridge, the bedrock of Long Pine Key is Miami Limestone of Pleistocene age. The rock has been subject to modification by solution and erosion, with a rough and pitted surface with caverns below. John Kunkel Small noted that "... the surface consists primarily of holes."

== Karst landscape ==
The Miami Rock Ridge hosts the Biscayne Aquifer, described as "one of the most permeable aquifers in the world". The surface of the Miami Rock Ridge is a karst landscape with sinkholes, vertical and horizontal solution pipes, sometimes open to the surface, at least one natural bridge (Arch Creek), and a number of small, shallow caves near the surface.

== Transverse glades ==
A number of transverse glades (sometimes called "finger glades") span the Miami Rock Ridge. Transverse glades occupy almost 35% of the ridge. Historically, the flow of water from the Everglades to Biscayne and Florida bays was through transverse glades. Some of the transverse glades completely cross the ridge, while others end on the eastern side in sinkholes. There are a dozen transverse glades between the Miami River and Taylor Slough, as well as ones north of the Miami River and across Long Pine Key flowing into Florida Bay. The transverse glades often fed streams and sloughs that discharged into Biscayne and Florida bays.

Western parts of the transverse glades, in the margin of the Everglades basin, are broad and shallow. The central portions, on the western side of the ridge, and the eastern portions, passing through the highest part of the coastal ridge, become progressively narrower and deeper. Transverse glades in northern and central Miami-Dade County tend to follow a northwest to southeast direction, while those in southern Miami-Dade County (including on Long Pine Key) tend to follow a north to south direction. The Miami Rock Ridge is relatively close to the shore of Biscayne Bay from the north end of Miami-Dade County until some ways below the Miami River, with the transverse glades approaching the shore. Further south the ridge trends southwestward, with a coastal plain separating the ridge fro m Biscayne Bay, consequently leaving the ends of the transverse glades further from open water.

The origin of the transverse glades has usually been ascribed to tidal channels in the oolite shoal that became the Miami Limestone. Meeder and Harlem argue that tidal channels in that shoal do not explain the structure of transverse glades, but that karst processes do. In Meeder and Harlem's proposal, transverse glades developed as a line of sinkholes and solution pipes in the limestone, followed by the collapse of the roofs of the solution pipes. Arches or evidence of past arches, uncollapsed remnants of solution pipes, have been found in several transverse glades, including Arch Creek.

== Ecology ==
The coastal ridge was traditionally a component of the endangered pine rocklands, which grew upon its length. Globally imperiled today, the environmental community consisted of a large, unbroken expanse of South Florida slash pines (Pinus elliottii var. densa), interspersed by tropical hardwood hammocks; related to the Bahamian pineyards, it also occupied the Florida Keys. The communities of the Miami Rock Ridge are sustained by wildfires, including those caused by lightning strikes, which affect the vegetation and its associates, maintaining biodiversity, with a 20% floristic endemism rate. Climate and an often-marly substrate limit the growth of vegetation, such that a mature subtropical hammock on the ridge typically is no taller than 59 feet (18 m). Development has largely removed the original communities, which have fragmented into tiny parts of their original range; remnants include Vizcaya Museum and Gardens, Simpson Park Hammock, and Alice Wainwright Park, which form part of Brickell Hammock, underlain by a large oolite outcrop, Silver Bluff. (Note: Noted first by Bernard Romans in 1771, the bluff faced Biscayne Bay as a landmark; a freshwater spring, the Punch Bowl, once gushed nearby.)

== Gallery ==
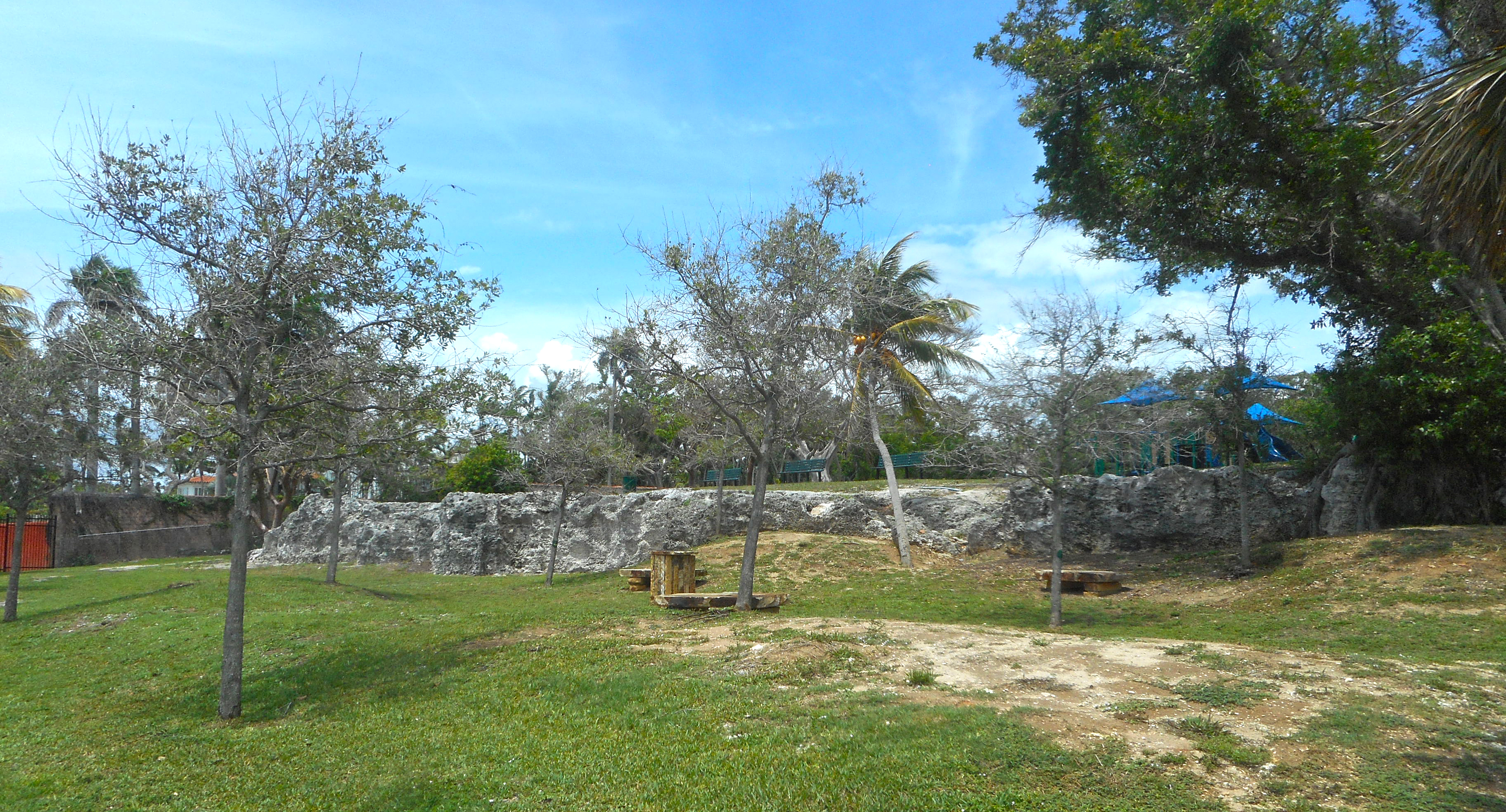
Miami Rock Ridge at Alice Wainwright Park

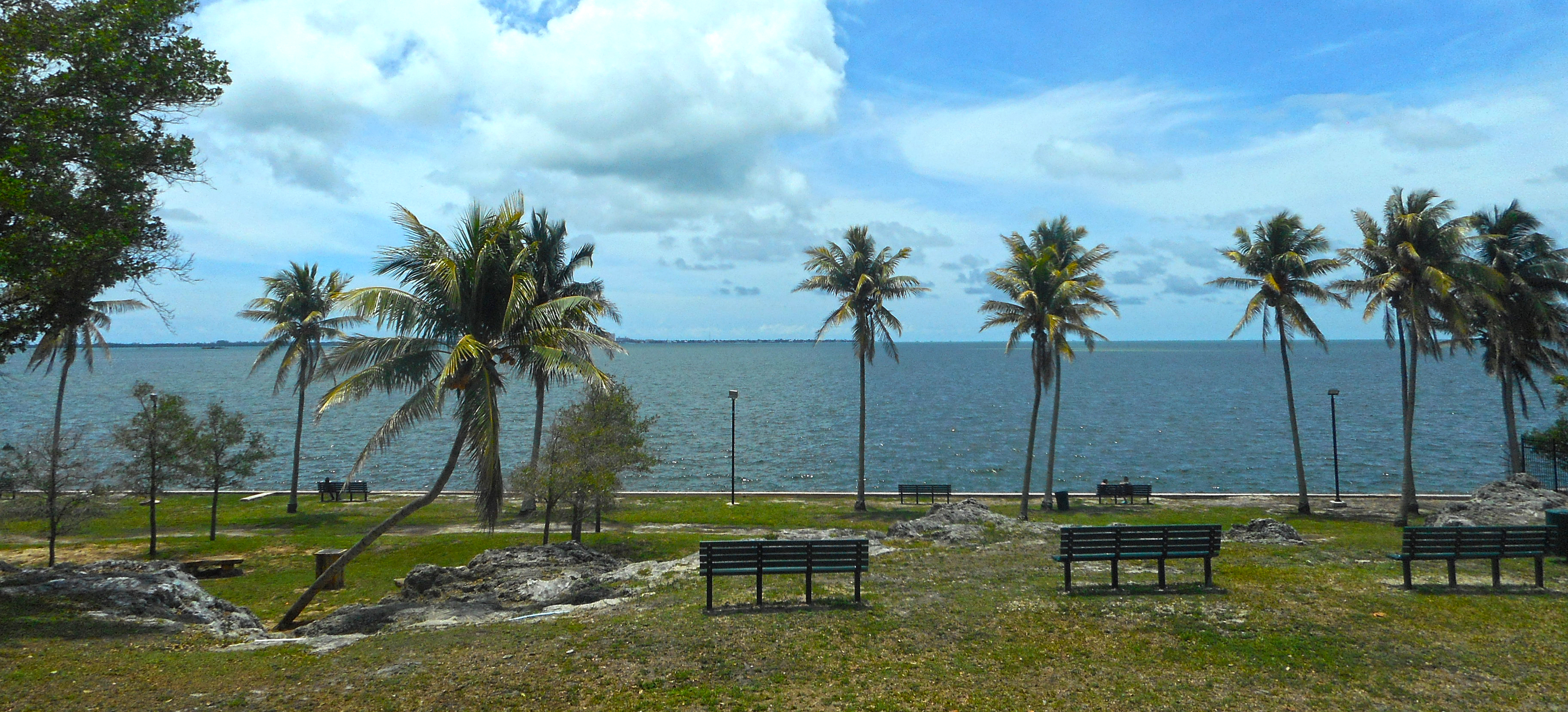
View of Biscayne Bay and Key Biscayne from atop the ridge

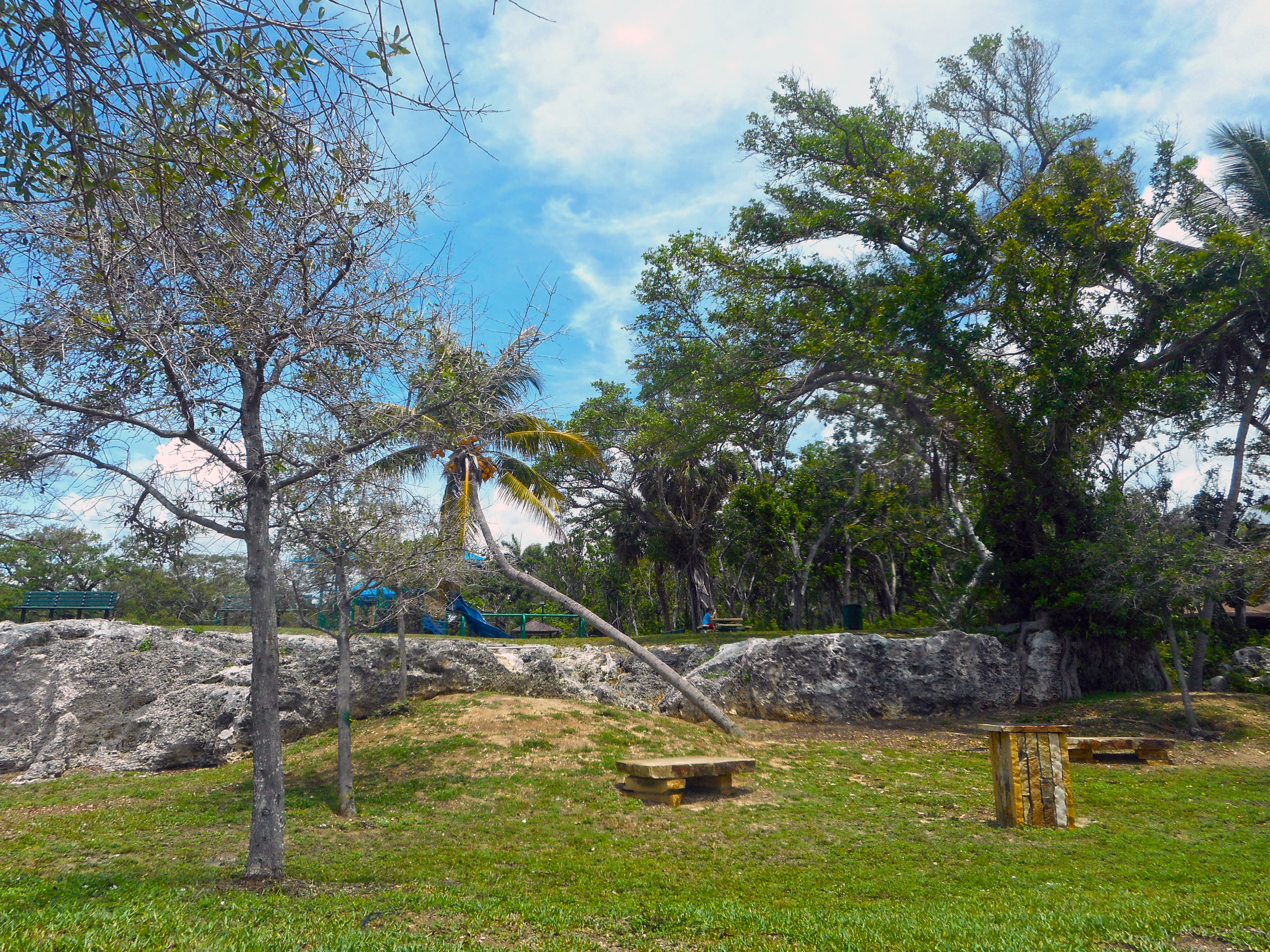
General view of ridge from below

== See also ==
- Arch Creek, Florida – Site of a natural arch in the Miami Rock Ridge
