= Simpson Park Hammock =

Park in Miami

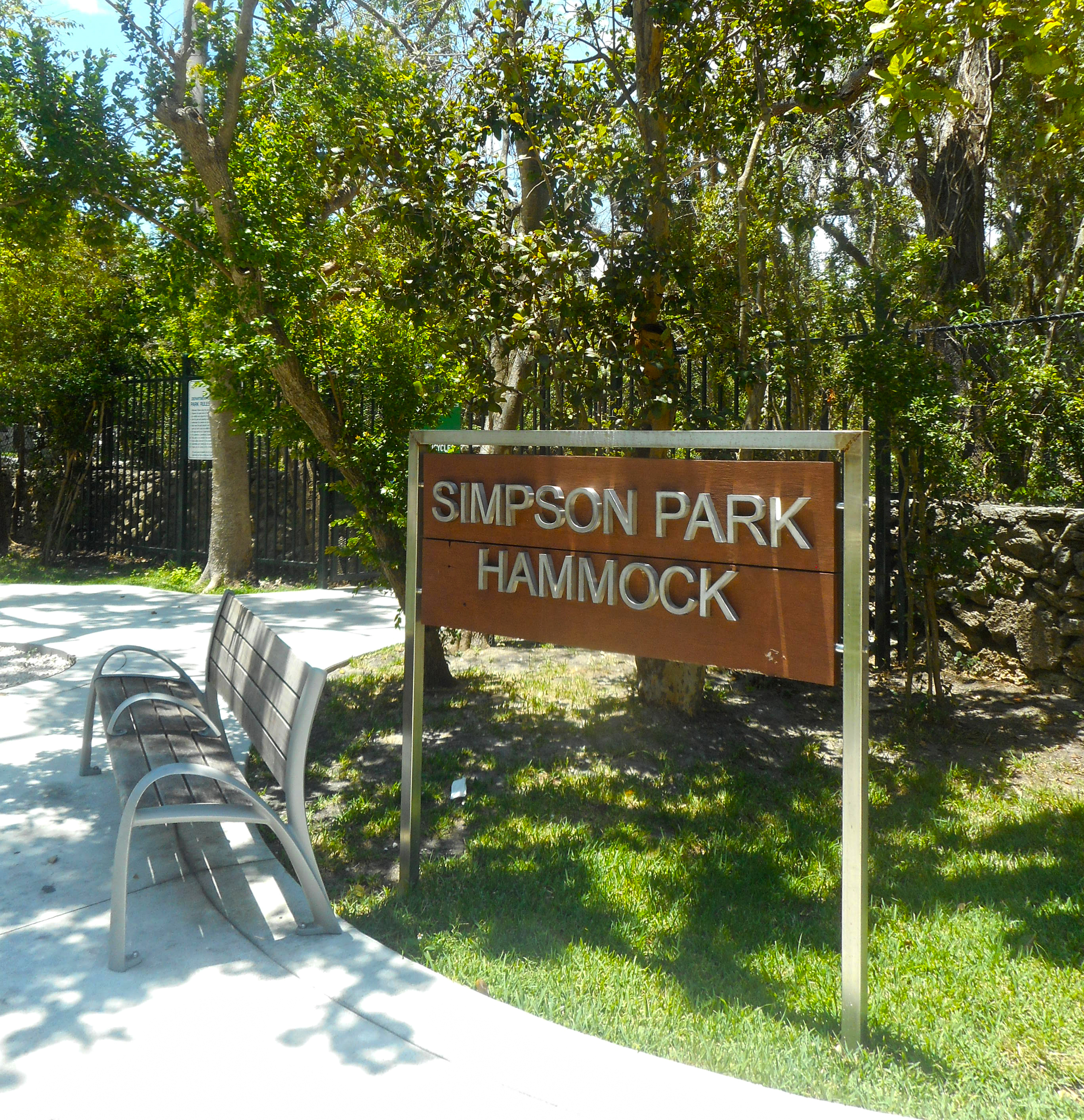
- Entrance on Broadway and South Miami Avenue
- Interactive map of Simpson Park Hammock
- Type: Municipal
- Location: 55 SW 17th Rd, Miami, FL 33129
- Coordinates: 25.759°N 80.196°W
- Area: 7.8 acres (0.032 km^{2})
- Created: 1913
- Operator: Miami-Dade Parks and Recreation Department
- Open: 8 a.m. - 3 p.m. (305) 533-3577
- Website: miamigov.com/parks/simpson.html

Simpson Park, officially Simpson Park Hammock, is a 7.8-acre (3.2 ha) urban park and nature preserve located between Brickell and The Roads neighborhoods of Miami, Florida. The park was originally known as Jungle Park, as 5.5 acres (2.2 ha) were set aside in 1913 by a group of individuals to preserve what is now one of the last remaining tracts (along with Alice Wainwright Park and a spot on Virginia Key) of Brickell Hammock, a tropical hardwood hammock which once ran from the Miami River to Coconut Grove. Part of the natural area is old-growth forest and recognized by the Old-Growth Forest Network.

The park lies on the Miami Rock Ridge at an elevation over 15 feet (4.6 m) above sea level, relatively high for the Miami area. The soils are mostly shallow muck (Matecumbe Series) over limestone. In 1927 the park's name was changed in honor of Miami botanist and conservationist Charles Torrey Simpson. In 1940 an additional 3 acres (1.2 ha) of adjacent hammock was incorporated into the park. A building known as the Charles Torrey Simpson Garden Center was constructed on this addition in 1941. This is also the main entrance to the park, at 55 SW 17th Road.

Simpson Park is home to 15 endangered plant species, such as Licaria triandra, and 9 threatened plant species. Being a remnant of local regional ecology in the highly developed downtown area, Simpson Park has the qualities of an urban wild or "passive park".

== Hurricane Irma ==
In September 2017, the park was closed for months after its canopy was heavily damaged by Hurricane Irma.

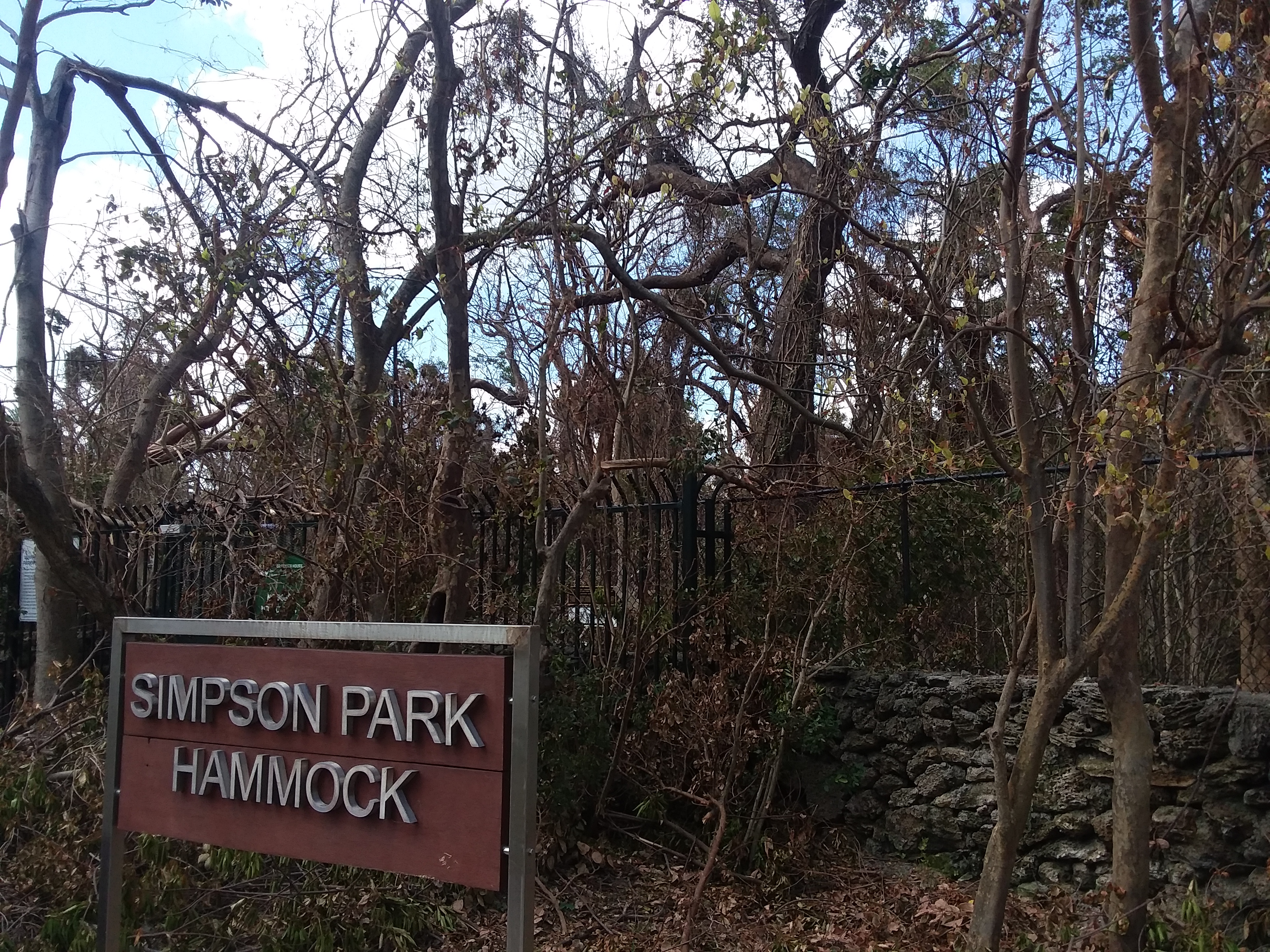
Entrance

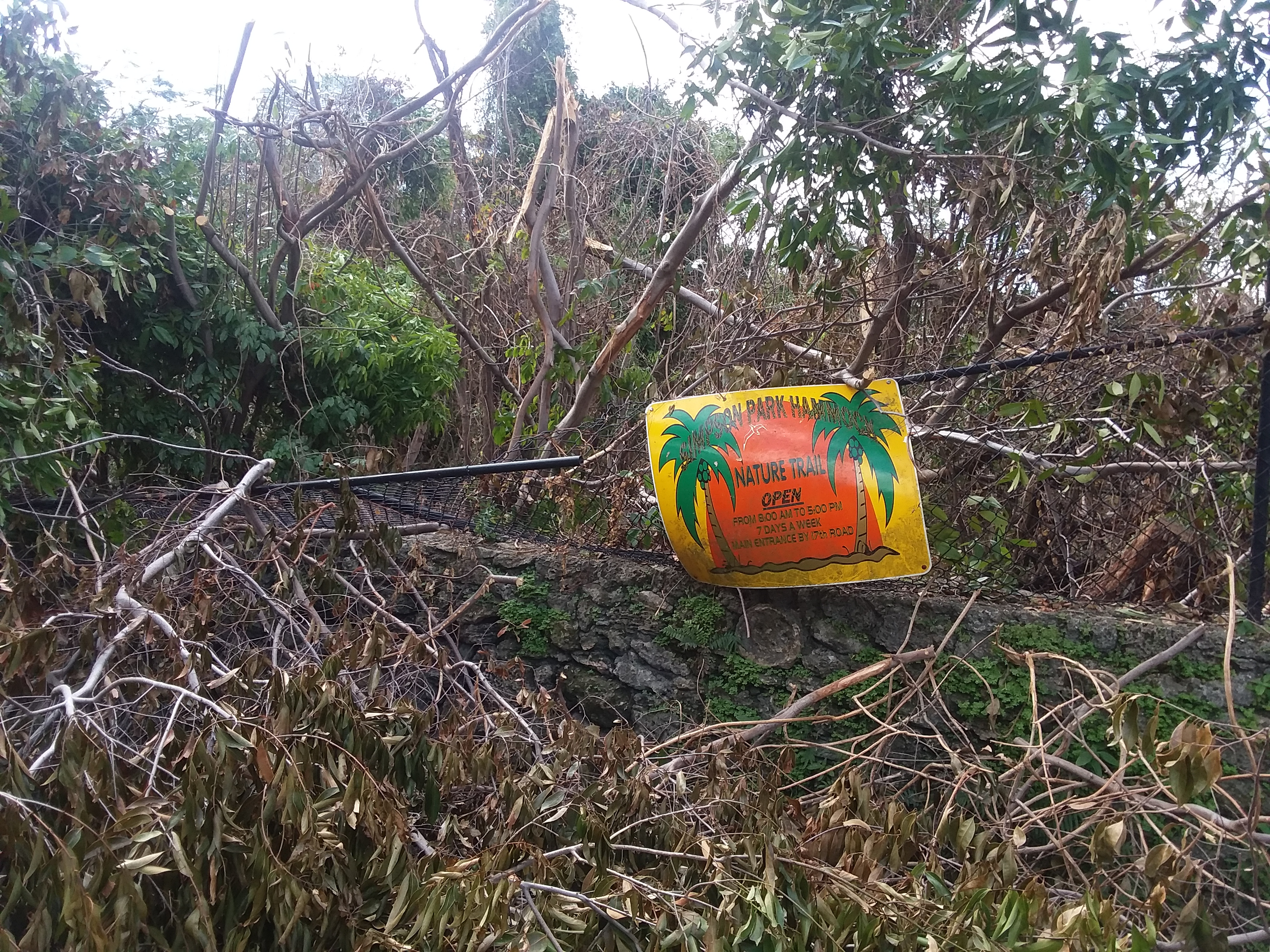
Fence damaged and canopy severely defoliated

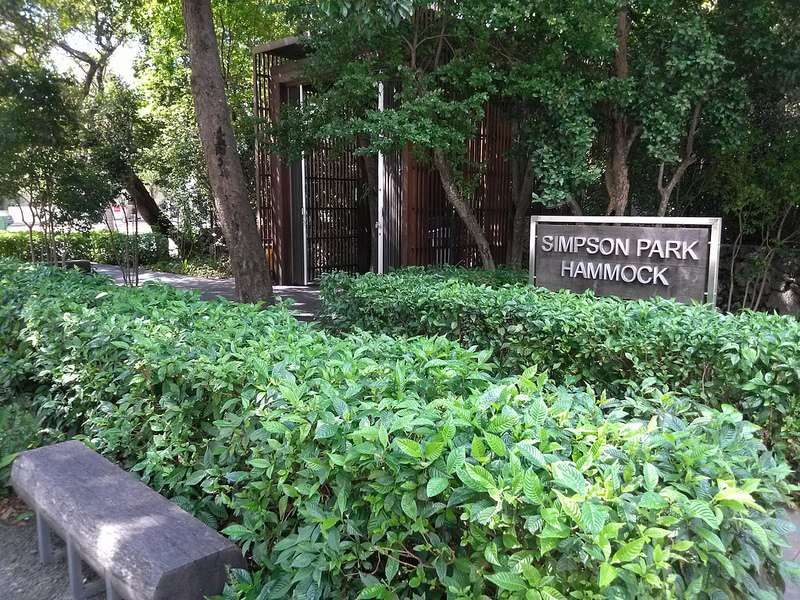
Old entrance on northeast at the corner of South Miami Avenue and Broadway (SW 15th Road)

== Gallery ==
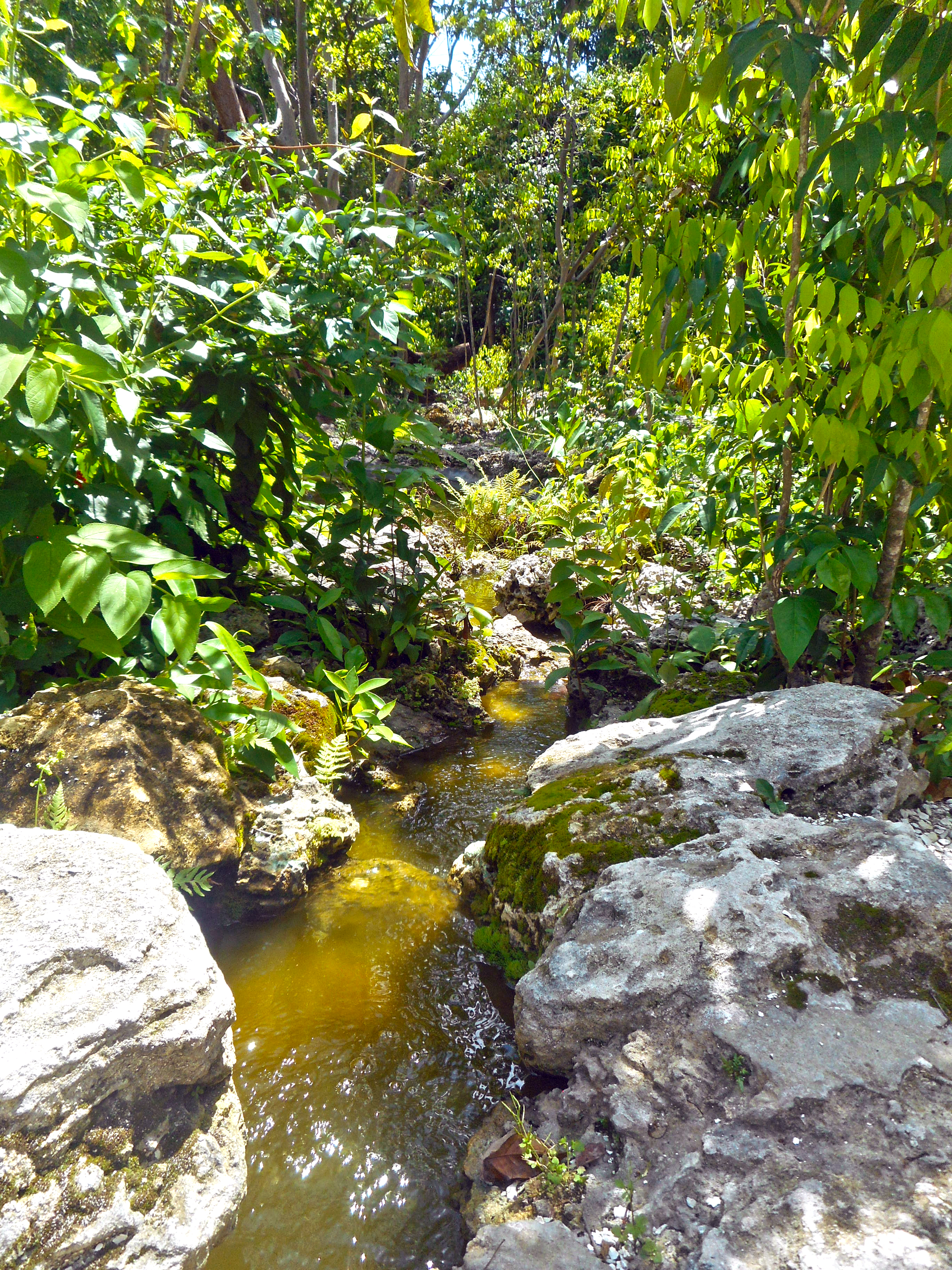
Artificial creek

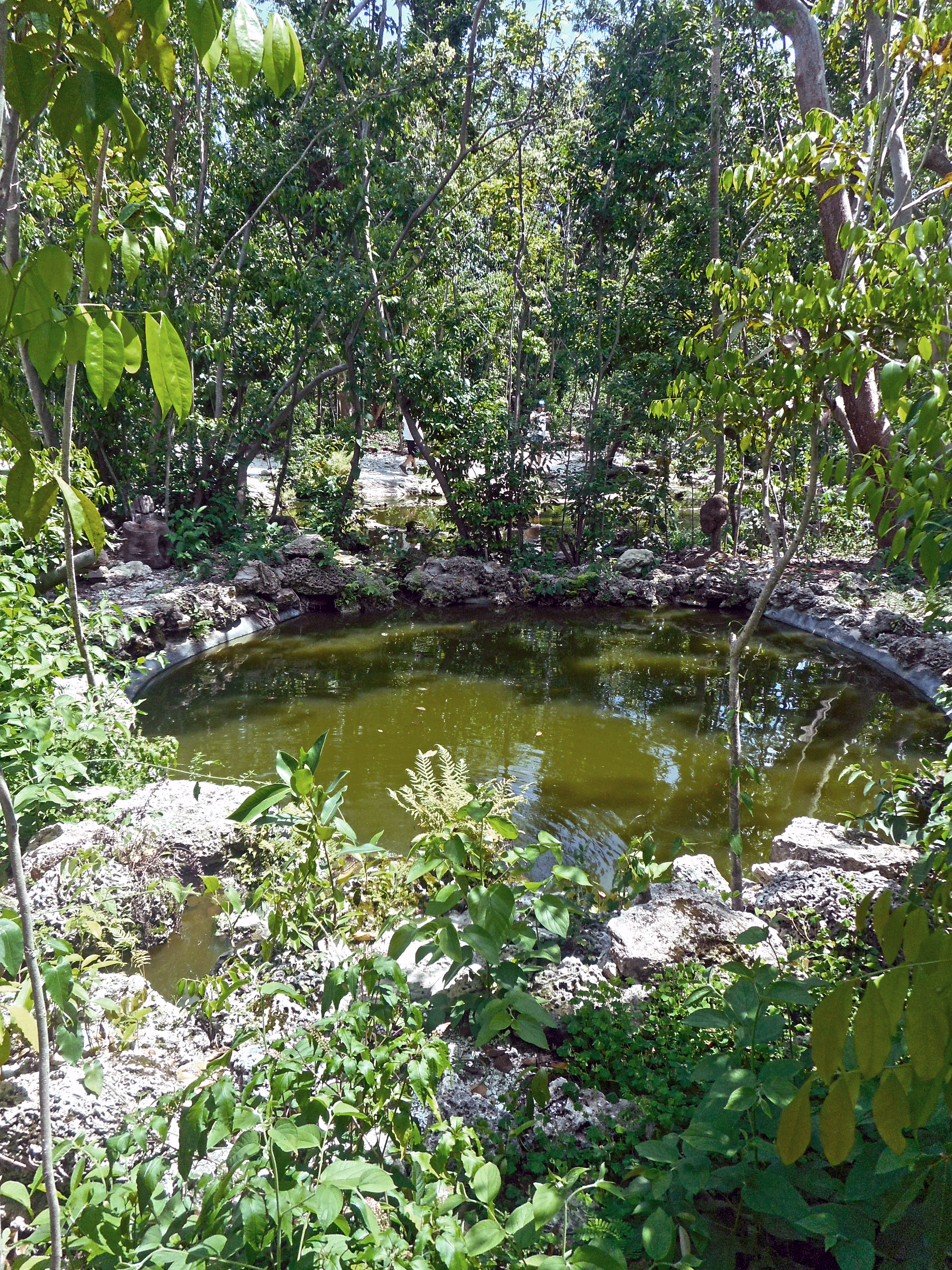
Artificial pond

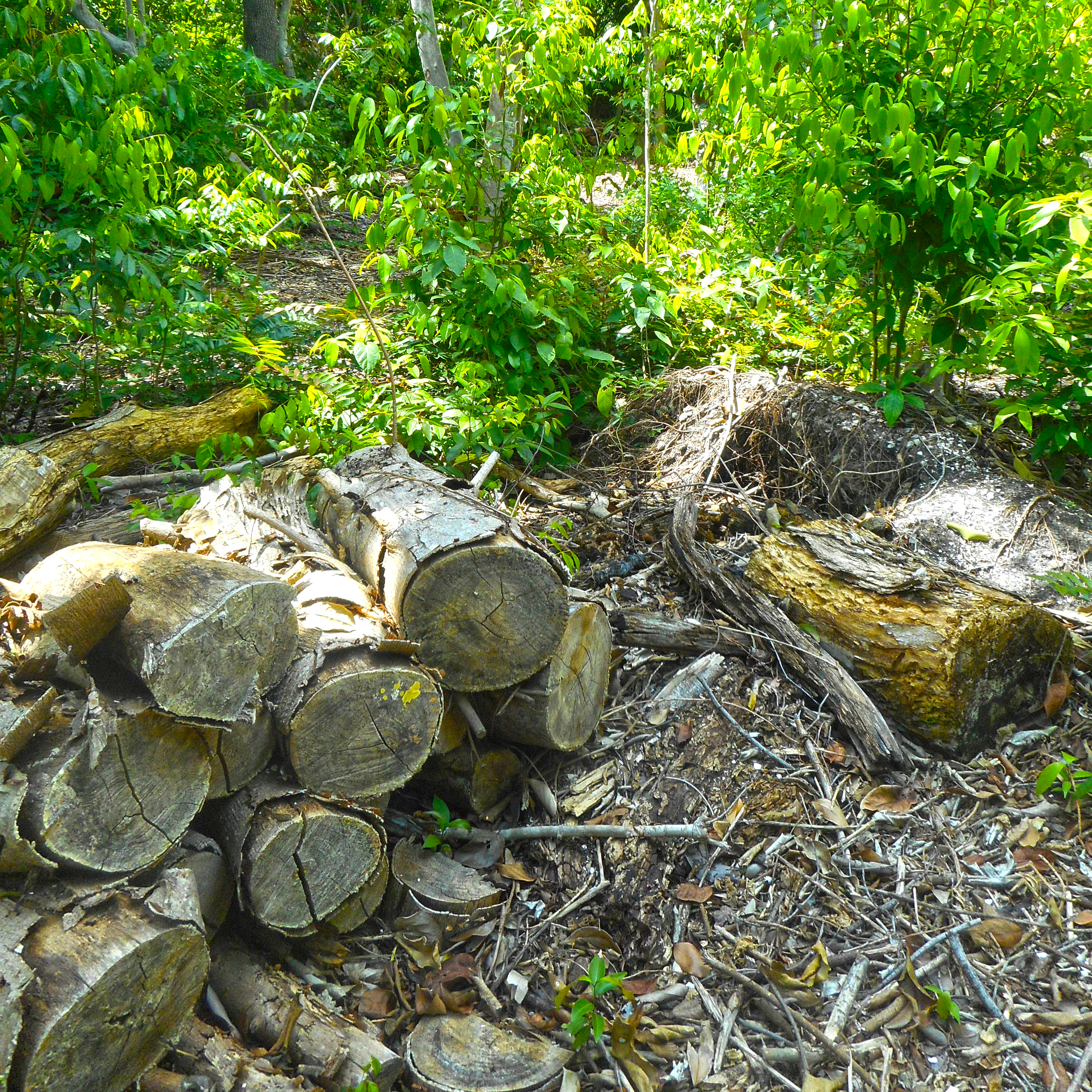
Fallen trees are cut and left to rot to provide topsoil for new plants

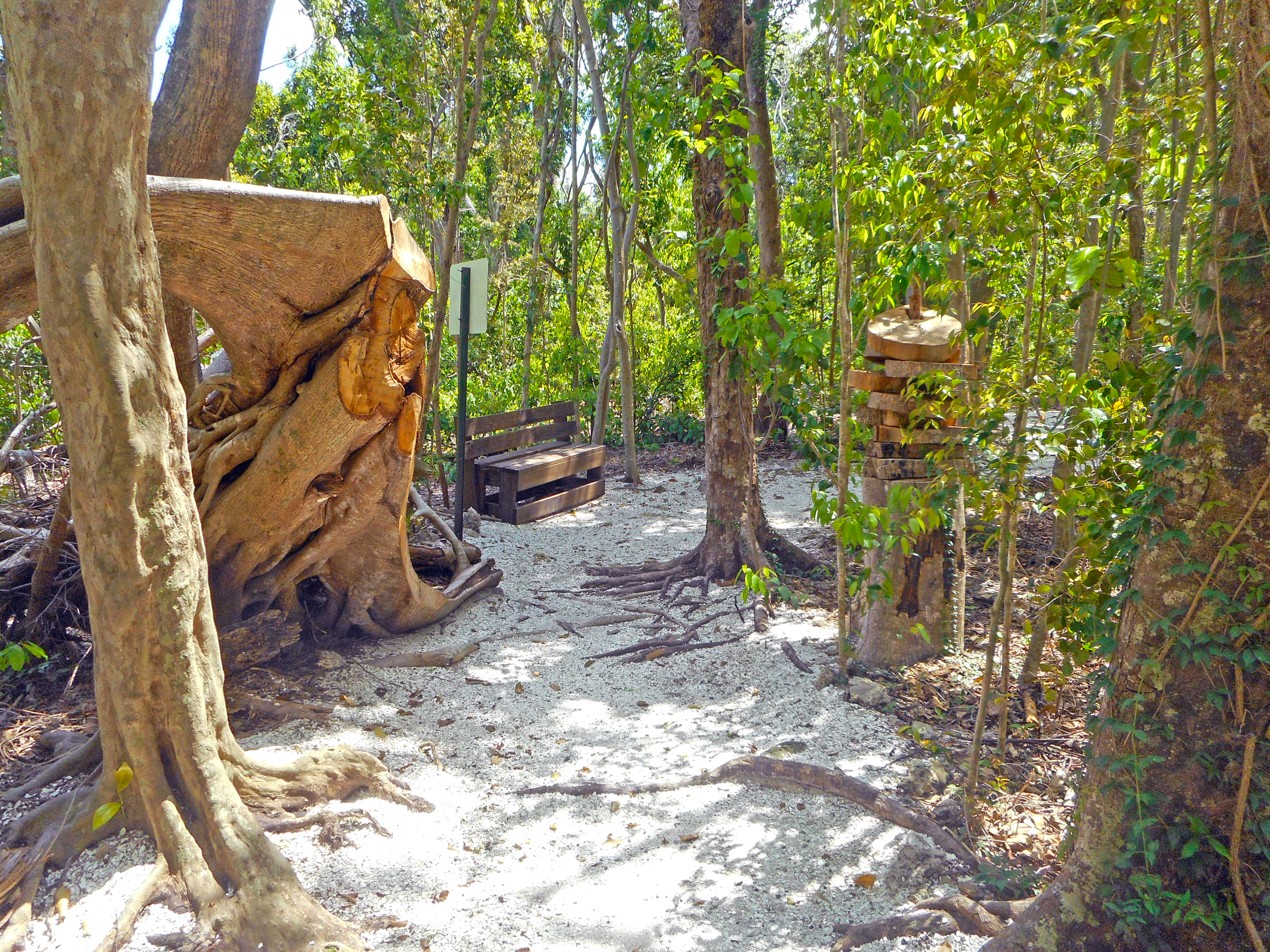
Pathway through the hammock with fallen trees

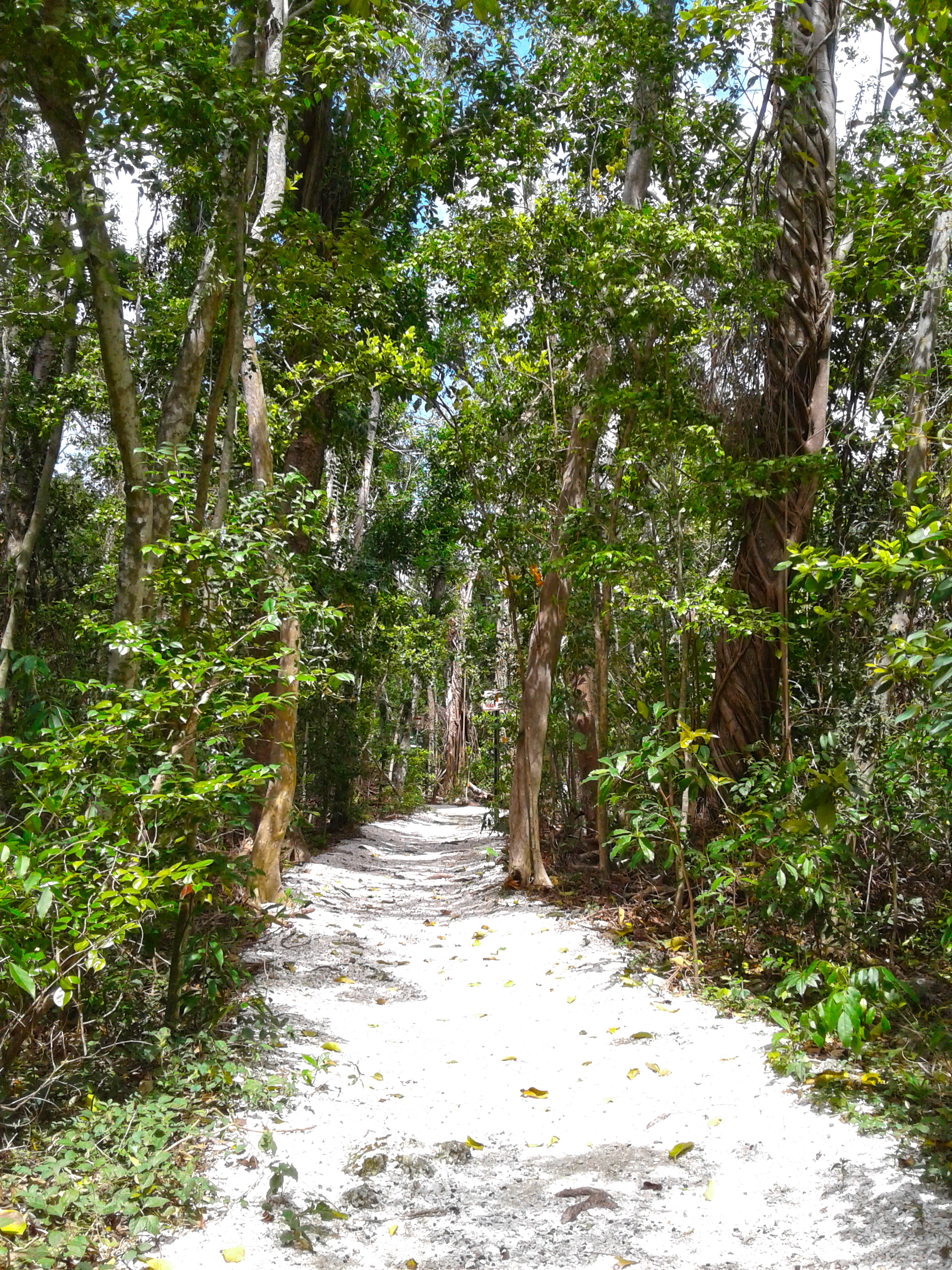
Another path through the trees

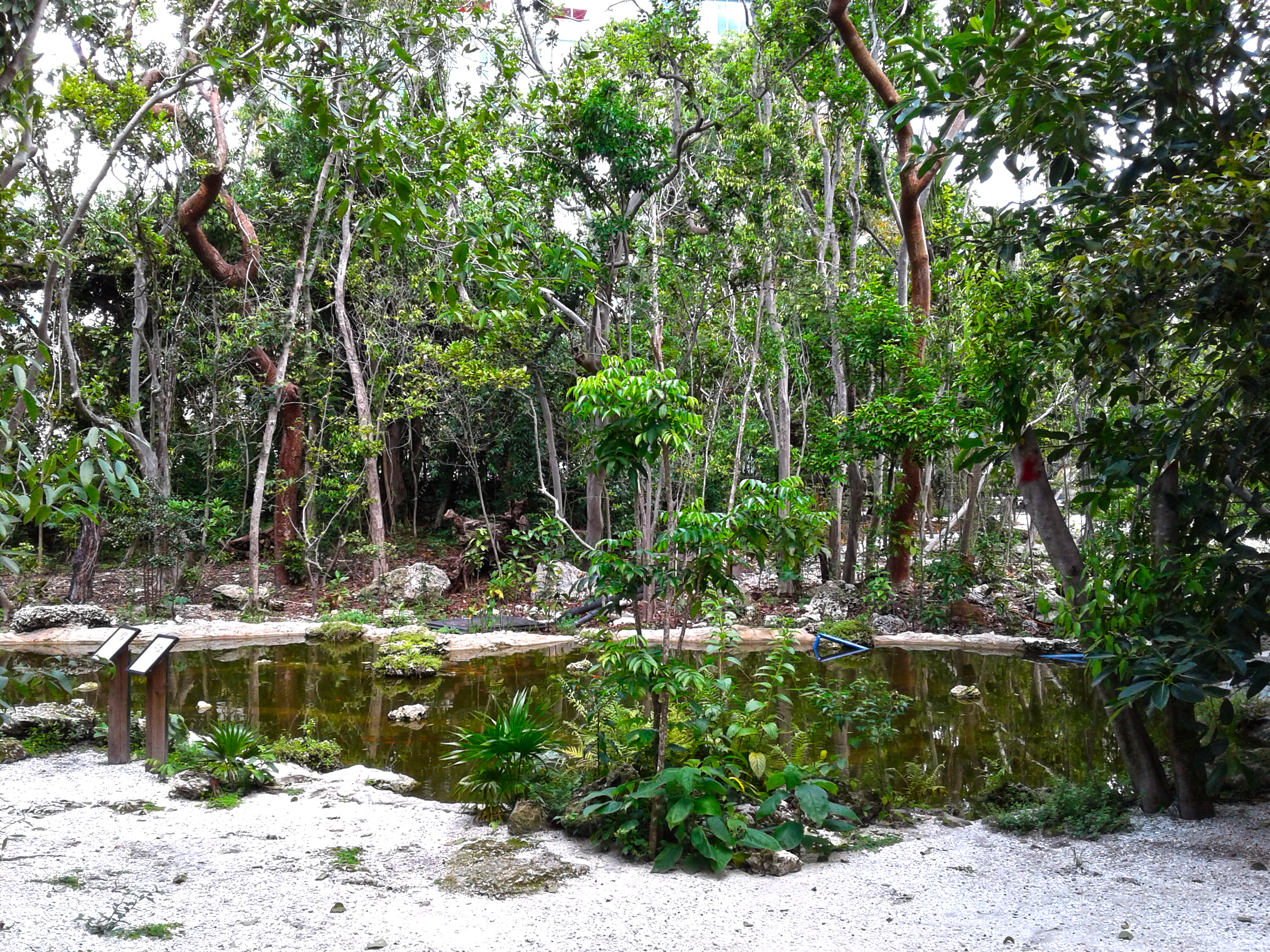
View of pond
