= List of diplomatic missions in Miami =

Many consulate offices in Miami are located in Downtown Miami, Brickell, while some are located in Coral Gables. A good majority of the official consulates located in Miami are Latin American and Caribbean consulates.

This is a list of diplomatic missions in Miami. Many foreign governments have established diplomatic and trade representation in the city of Miami. Miami is one of the cities with the most consulate-general offices in the United States. Additionally some trade offices exist.

== Consulates general and honorary consulates in Miami ==
Country	Mission	Website	Address	Neighborhood or town	Image
Albania	Honorary consul		4077 NE 5th Street. Fort Lauderdale, FL 33334	Fort Lauderdale	
Argentina	Consulate-general		1101 Brickell Avenue, North Tower, Suite 900, Miami, FL 33131	Brickell	
Australia	Honorary consulate		11200 Andalusia Avenue, Suite CCA 100, Coral Gables, FL 33134	Coral Gables	
Austria	Honorary consulate		2445 Hollywood Blvd., Hollywood, FL 33022	Hollywood	
Bahamas	Consulate-general		100 N. Biscayne Blvd., Suite 900, Miami, FL 33132	Downtown Miami	
Bangladesh	Consulate-general		760 NW 107th Ave., Suite 320, Miami, FL 33172	Fontainebleau	
Barbados	Consulate-general		2121 Ponce de Leon Boulevard, Suite 1300, Coral Gables, FL 33134	Coral Gables	
Belarus	Honorary consulate		12363 Hernando Road, North Port, Florida 34287	North Port	
Belgium	Honorary consulate		990 Biscayne Blvd, Suite 701, Miami, FL 33131	Downtown Miami	
Belize	Consulate-general		1600 Ponce de Leon Blvd, Suite 904, Coral Gables, FL 33134	Coral Gables	
Bolivia	Consulate-general		3750 NW 87 Street #240, Doral, FL 33178	Doral	
Brazil	Consulate-general		3150 S.W. 38 Avenue, Suite 100, Miami, FL 33146	Coral Way	
Bulgaria	Consulate-general		100 SE Second Street, Suite 4200, Miami, FL 33131	Downtown Miami	
Canada	Consulate-general		200 S. Biscayne Blvd, Suite 1600, Miami, FL 33131	Downtown Miami	
Chile	Consulate-general		800 Brickell Avenue, Suite 1200, Miami, FL 33131	Brickell	
Colombia	Consulate-general		280 Aragon Avenue, Coral Gables, FL 33134	Coral Gables	
Costa Rica	Consulate-general		2730 S.W. 3rd Avenue, Suite 401, Miami, FL 33129	The Roads	
Czech Republic	Honorary consulate		13258 Arch Creek Road, North Miami, FL 33181	North Miami	
Denmark	Consulate-general		213 East Sheridan Street, Suite 3, Dania Beach, FL 33004	Dania Beach	
Dominican Republic	Consulate-general		1038 Brickell Avenue, Miami, FL 33131	Brickell	
Ecuador	Consulate-general		117 N.W. 42 Avenue, Units Cu-4 & Cu-5, Miami, FL 33126	West Flagler	
El Salvador	Consulate-general		8550 N.W. 33 Street, Suite #100, Doral, FL 33122	Doral	
Estonia	Honorary consulate		19 West Flagler Street, Suite 1212, Biscayne Building, Miami, FL 33130	Downtown Miami	
Finland	Honorary consulate		78 S.W. 7th Street, Suite 500, Miami, FL 33130	Brickell	
France	Consulate-general		1395 Brickell Avenue, Suite 1050, Miami, FL 33131	Brickell	
Gambia	Honorary consulate		12875 NE 14th Avenue, Miami, Florida 33161	North Miami	
Germany	Consulate-general		100 N. Biscayne Blvd, Suite 2200, Miami, FL 33132	Downtown Miami	
Greece	Consulate-general		400 N. Tampa Street, Suite 1160, Tampa, Florida 33602	Tampa	
Grenada	Consulate-general		11900 Biscayne Blvd Ste 740, North Miami, FL 33181, United States	North Miami	
Guatemala	Consulate-general		999 Ponce de Leon Blvd., Suite 100, Coral Gables, FL 33134	Coral Gables	
Guyana	Honorary consulate		6444 N.W. 7th Avenue, Miami, FL 33150	Liberty City	
Haiti	Consulate-general		259 S.W. 13th Street, Miami, FL 33130	Brickell	
Honduras	Consulate-general		8600 NW, 36th Street, Suite#101, Miami, FL 33166	Doral	
Hungary	Vice-consulate		2121 Ponce de Leon Blvd., Suite 732, Coral Gables, FL 33134	Coral Gables	
Iceland	Honorary consulate		2661 NE 22nd Street, Pompano Beach, FL 33062	Pompano Beach	
Ireland	Consulate-general		201 S. Biscayne Blvd, 28th Floor, Miami, FL 33131	Downtown Miami	
Israel	Consulate-general		100 N. Biscayne Blvd, Suite 1800, Miami, FL 33132	Downtown Miami	
Italy	Consulate-general		4000 Ponce De Leon Blvd, Suite 590, Coral Gables, FL 33146	Downtown Miami	
Jamaica	Consulate-general		44 W. Flagler Street, Suite 400, Miami, FL 33130	Downtown Miami	
Japan	Consulate-general		80 S.W. 8th Street, Suite 3200, Miami, FL 33130	Brickell	
Latvia	Honorary consulate		3122 West Buena Vista Drive, Margaret, FL 33063	Margaret	
Lebanon	Honorary consulate		1320 S Dixie Hwy, Coral Gables, FL 33146, United States	Coral Gables	
Lithuania	Honorary consulate		2235 16th Avenue North, St. Petersburg, FL 33713	St. Petersburg	
Luxembourg	Honorary consulate		10082 Montevina Drive, Estero, FL 33928	Estero	
Malaysia	Trade center		1000 NW 57th CT, Suite 270, Miami, FL 33126		
Malta	Honorary consulate		200 South Biscayne Boulevard, Suite 4100. Miami, FL 33131		
Mexico	Consulate-general		2555 Ponce de Leon, 4th Floor, Coral Gables, FL 33134	Coral Gables	
Monaco	Honorary consulate		1600 Ponce de Leon Blvd., Suite 1053, Coral Gables, FL 33134	Coral Gables	
Montenegro	Honorary consulate		5900 N. Australian Avenue, West Palm Beach, FL 33407	West Palm Beach	
Morocco	Consulate-general		2004 SW 7th Avenue Miami, FL 33129	The Roads	
Mozambique	Honorary consulate				
Namibia	Honorary consulate		200 S. Orange Avenue, Suite 2600, Orlando, Florida 32801	Orlando	
Netherlands	Consulate-general		701 Brickell Avenue, Suite 500, Miami, FL 33131	Brickell	
Nicaragua	Consulate-general		1332 West Flagler Street, Miami, FL 33125	Downtown Miami	
North Macedonia	Honorary consulate		1435 Yellowheart Way, Hollywood, FL 33019	Hollywood	
Norway	Honorary consulate		806 S. Douglas Rd., Suite 580, Coral Gables, FL 33134	Coral Gables	
Panama	Consulate-general		5775 Blue Lagoon Drive, Suite 200, Miami, FL 33126		
Paraguay	Consulate-general		2655 S. LeJeune Rd., Suite 910, Coral Gables, FL 33134	Coral Gables	
Peru	Consulate-general		1401 Ponce de León Blvd. 3rd Floor, Coral Gables FL 33134	Coral Gables	
Philippines	Honorary consulate		1200 Brickell Avenue, Miami, FL 33131	Brickell	
Poland	Honorary consulate		1440 79th Street Causeway, # 117, Miami, FL 33141	North Bay Village	
Portugal	Honorary consulate		2000 Ponce De Leon Blvd, Suite 600, Coral Gables, Fl 33134	Coral Gables	
Romania	Consulate-general		1101 Brickell Avenue, Suite N600, Miami, FL 33131	Brickell	
Saint Kitts and Nevis	Consulate		1430 NE 101st Street, Miami Shores, FL, 33138	Miami Shores	
Saint Lucia	Consulate-general		2 Alhambra Plaza, Suite 850, Coral Gables, FL 33134	Coral Gables	
Saint Vincent and the Grenadines	Honorary consulate		4901 Washington Avenue, Orlando, Florida 32819	Orlando	
Samoa	Honorary consulate		2260 Front Street, Suite #402, Melbourne, Florida 32901	Orlando	
Sierra Leone	Consulate-general		AON Building, 600 Brickell Bay Drive, Suite 1716, Miami, FL 33131	Brickell	
Singapore	Honorary consulate		515 Sunset Drive, Suite 44, Coral Gables, 33143	Coral Gables	
Slovak Republic	Honorary consulate		13325 Arch Creek Road, North Miami, FL 33181	North Miami	
Slovenia	Honorary consulate		1501 Calais Drive, Miami Beach, FL 33141	Miami Beach	
South Korea	Honorary consulate		201 South Biscayne Blvd., Suite 800, Miami, FL 33131	Downtown Miami	
Spain	Consulate-general		2655 Le Jeune Rd., Suite 203, Coral Gables, FL 33134	Coral Gables	
Suriname	Consulate-general		7205 NW 19th Street, Suite 302, Miami, FL 33126	Coral Gables	
Sweden	Honorary consulate		1 East Broward Boulevard, 3rd floor, Fort Lauderdale, FL 33301	Fort Lauderdale	
Switzerland	Honorary consulate		8400 NW 25 Street, Suite 104, Doral, FL 33122	Doral	
Taiwan	Economic and cultural office		2333 Ponce de Leon Blvd, Suite 610, Coral Gables, FL 33134	Coral Gables	
Thailand	Trade office		6100 Blue Lagoon Dr., Suite 100, Miami, FL 33126		
Togo	Trade office		600 Brickell Avenue, Suite 3800, Miami, FL 33131	Brickell	
Trinidad and Tobago	Consulate-general		1000 Brickell Avenue, Suite 800, Miami, FL 33131	Brickell	
Tunisia	Honorary consulate		1800 S.W. 1st Avenue, Suite 403, Miami, FL 33129	Brickell	
Turkey	Consulate-general		80 SW 8 Street, Suite 2700, Miami, FL 33130	Brickell	
Uganda	Honorary consulate		11701 Lake Victoria Gardens Ave., Suite 2202, Palm Beach Gardens, FL 33410	Palm Beach Gardens	
United Arab Emirates	Consulate-general				
United Kingdom	Consulate-general		1001 Brickell Bay Drive, Suite 2800, Miami, FL 33131	Brickell	
Uruguay	Consulate-general		2103 Coral Way, Suite 600, Miami, FL 33145	Coral Way	
