= The Roads =

- Neighborhood of Miami
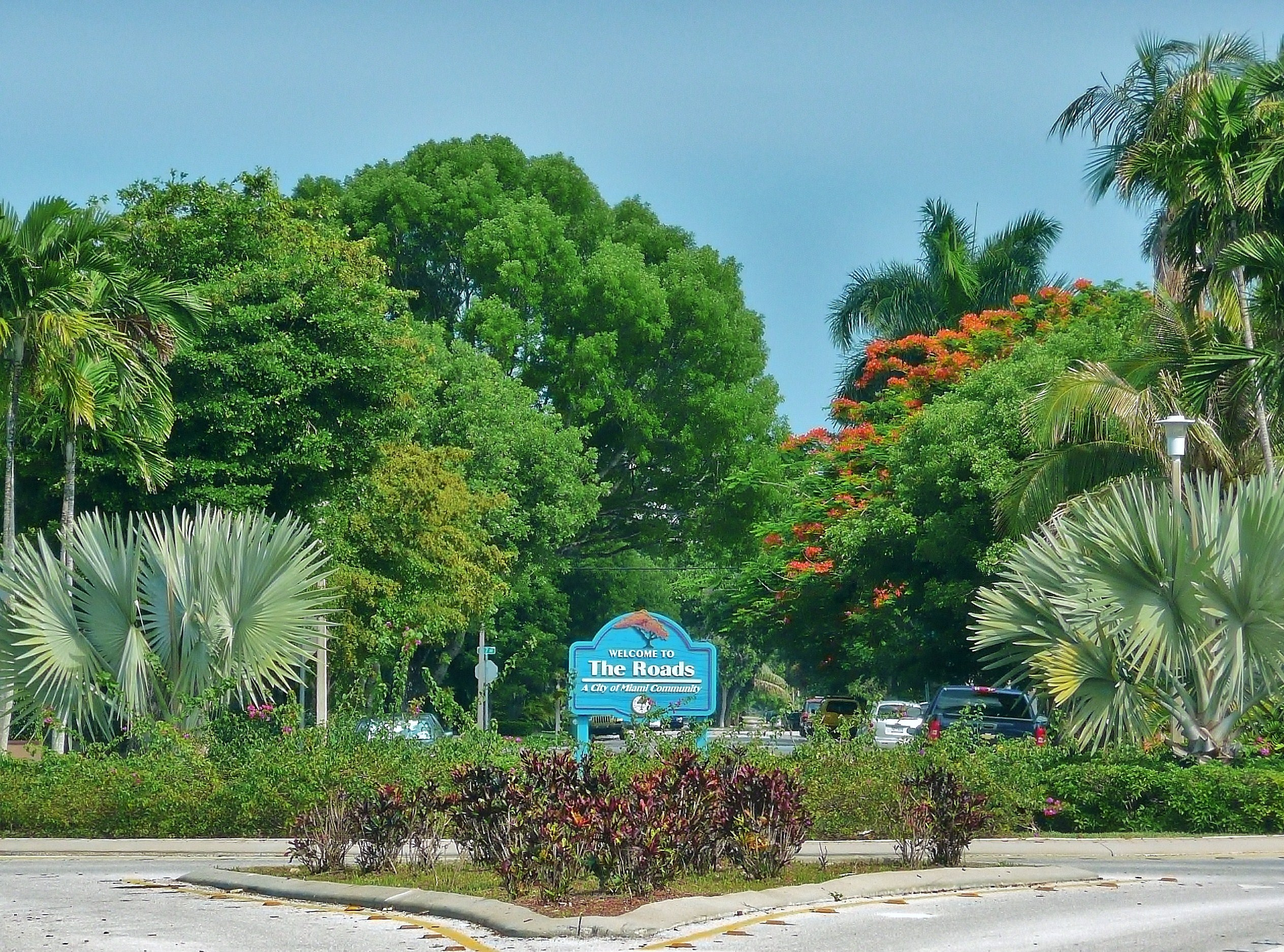
- Entrance to The Roads neighborhood

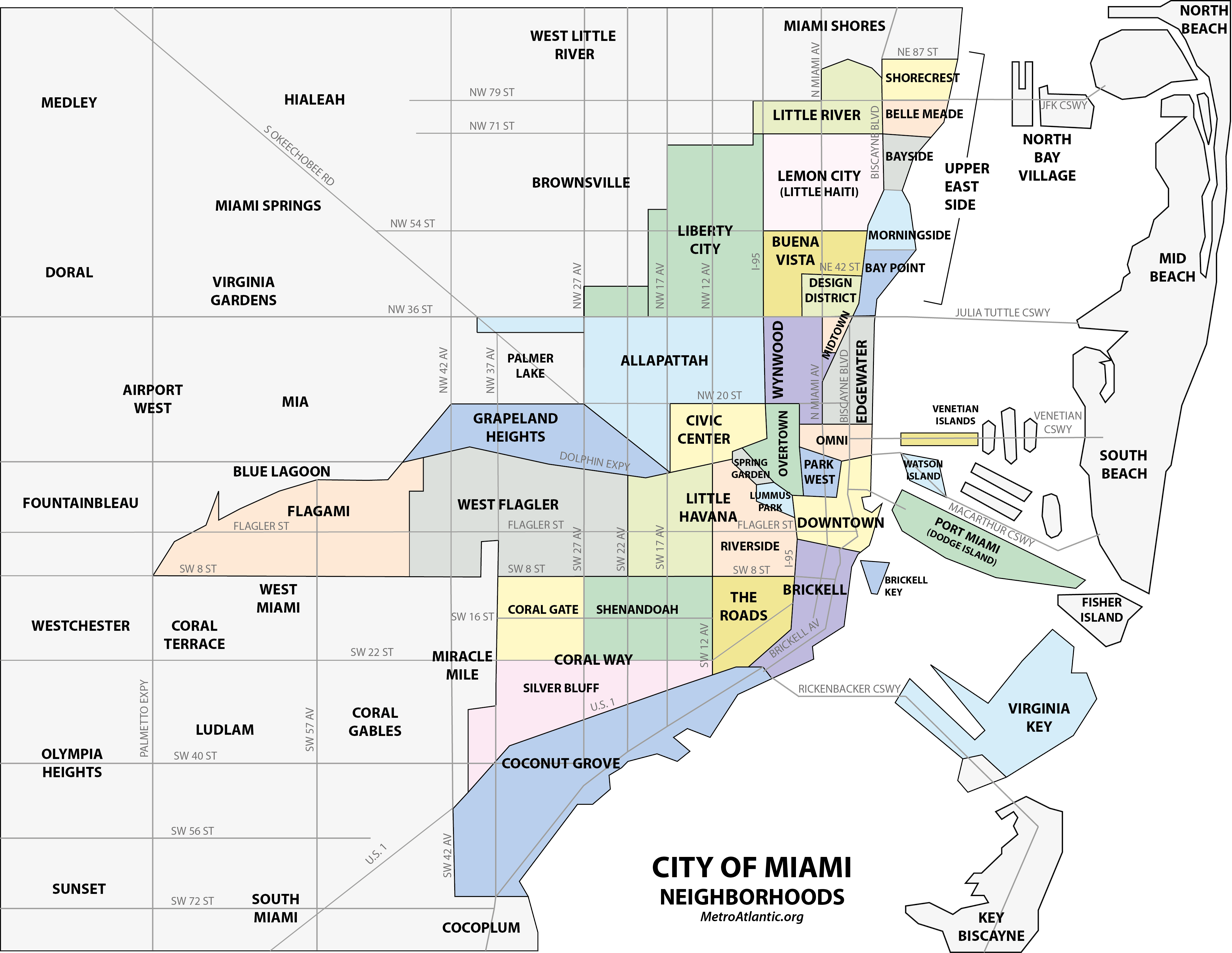
- The Roads neighborhood within the City of Miami
- Coordinates: 25.756°N 80.205°W
- Country: United States
- State: Florida
- County: Miami-Dade County
- City: Miami

Government
  - City of Miami Commissioner: Joe Carollo (R)
  - Miami-Dade Commissioner: Eileen Higgins (D)
  - House of Representatives: Luis R. Garcia Jr. (D)
  - State Senate: José Javier Rodríguez (Florida) (D)
  - U.S. House: Maria Elvira Salazar (R)
- Elevation: 13 ft (4 m)

Population (2010)
  - Total: 7,327
  - Density: 12,687/sq mi (4,898/km^{2})
- Time zone: UTC-05 (EST)
- ZIP Code: 33129
- Area codes: 305, 786
- Website: The Roads Association

The Roads is a neighborhood of Miami in Miami-Dade County, Florida. It is a triangular area located south of SW 11th Street, between SW 12th Avenue and SW 15th Road, just west of Brickell.

The Roads is known for its old homes, historic private schools, and its tree-covered streets. The Roads is very close to Downtown and Brickell, but is a historically residential neighborhood. It is also off the normal Miami street grid, and thus all the streets in The Roads are named roads, instead of streets and avenues, as is the case in the rest of Miami. Since 1986, the Miami Roads Neighborhood Civic Association has worked on a variety of projects to support the neighborhood.

The Roads neighborhood is served by the Miami Metrorail at the Vizcaya station to the south and by the Brickell station to the north.

== History ==
The Roads, originally called "Brickell Hammock" was designed, platted and developed by Mary Brickell in January 1922 days before her death. Mary Brickell had designed the Roads as a pedestrian-friendly neighborhood, with wide streets with median parkways and roundabouts with native Miami plants. Mary Brickell gave the streets, parkways, sidewalks, and electric lighting to the City of Miami in 1922. All the properties were sold in a single day on February 1, 1923.

Although the homes in the Roads were originally planned to be affordable for Miamians, homes in the Roads were popular early on and quickly became one of Miami's most prestigious neighborhoods.

== Geography ==
It is located at 25.756°N 80.205°W, with an elevation 13 feet (4.0 m), making it one of the higher areas in the city.

The Roads is also an entire off-grid plan section of the city of Miami. The streets and avenues in Miami-Dade County are aligned to a grid, where streets run east–west and avenues run north–south. The roads that run from Broadway to SW 32nd Road are roughly 45 degrees out of alignment with the grid-plan. The avenues running perpendicular to these roads are also 45 degrees out of alignment with their respective avenues coming from the north. The avenues in this section run northeast–southwest rather than the standard north–south that the ones in the rest of the county follow. This causes an abrupt change in numerical designation as they cross SW 12th Avenue (SW 5th Avenue turns west and becomes SW 18th Street, SW 4th Avenue turns west and becomes SW 20th Street, SW 2nd Avenue turns west and becomes SW 22nd Street, etc.) The most well known example of this confusion is when historic Coral Way being SW 3rd Avenue, makes a 45 degree turn onto SW 22nd Street as it crosses over SW 12th Avenue.

== Transportation ==
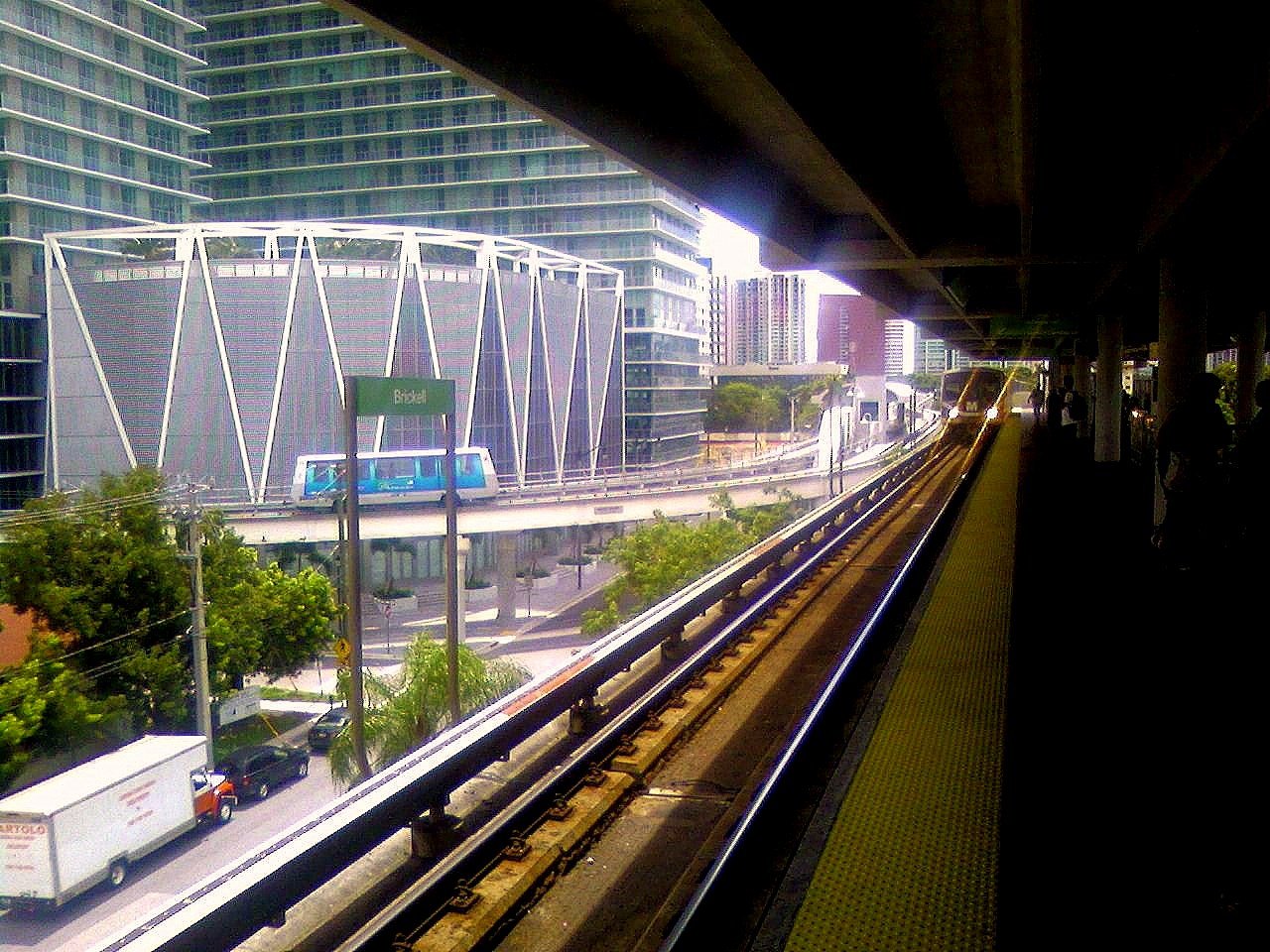
The Metro's Brickell station

The Roads is served by Metrobus throughout the area, and by the Miami Metrorail at:

- Brickell (SW 11th Street and SW 1st Avenue)
- Vizcaya (SW 32nd Road and U.S. 1)

Metrorail has stops throughout Miami with service to Greater Miami and Miami International Airport, all Miami-Dade County bus lines, Tri-Rail and Amtrak. The main bus station in Downtown is located next to the Arsht Center.

== Education ==
Miami-Dade County Public Schools operates area public schools

=== Private schools ===
- Beth David Religious School
- Lincoln Marti School
- St. Peter and Paul

== Parks ==
- Simpson Park Hammock- (nature preserve) S. Miami Ave and Broadway
- Alice Wainwright Park- (nature preserve) Brickell Ave and the Rickenbacker Causeway
- Vizcaya Museum and Gardens- 3251 S Miami Ave

== See also ==
- Neighborhoods in Miami
