= Licaria cubensis =

Conservation status
- Vulnerable (IUCN 3.1)

Scientific classification
- Kingdom: Plantae
- Clade: Tracheophytes
- Clade: Angiosperms
- Clade: Magnoliids
- Order: Laurales
- Family: Lauraceae
- Genus: Licaria
- Species: L. cubensis

Binomial name
- Licaria cubensis (O.C.Schmidt) Kosterm.

Synonyms
- Misanteca cubensis (O.C.Schmidt) Lundell; Nobeliodendron cubense O.C.Schmidt

Species of flowering plant

Licaria cubensis is a species of flowering plant in the family Lauraceae. It is a tree endemic to eastern Cuba.

The species was first described as Nobeliodendron cubense by Otto Christian Schmidt in 1929. In 1937 André Joseph Guillaume Henri Kostermans placed the species in genus Licaria as L. cubensis.
