= Licaria velutina =

Conservation status
- Endangered (IUCN 3.1)

Scientific classification
- Kingdom: Plantae
- Clade: Tracheophytes
- Clade: Angiosperms
- Clade: Magnoliids
- Order: Laurales
- Family: Lauraceae
- Genus: Licaria
- Species: L. velutina

Binomial name
- Licaria velutina van der Werff

Species of flowering plant

Licaria velutina is a species of flowering plant in the family Lauraceae. It is a tree endemic to Chiapas, Oaxaca, and Veracruz in southern Mexico.
