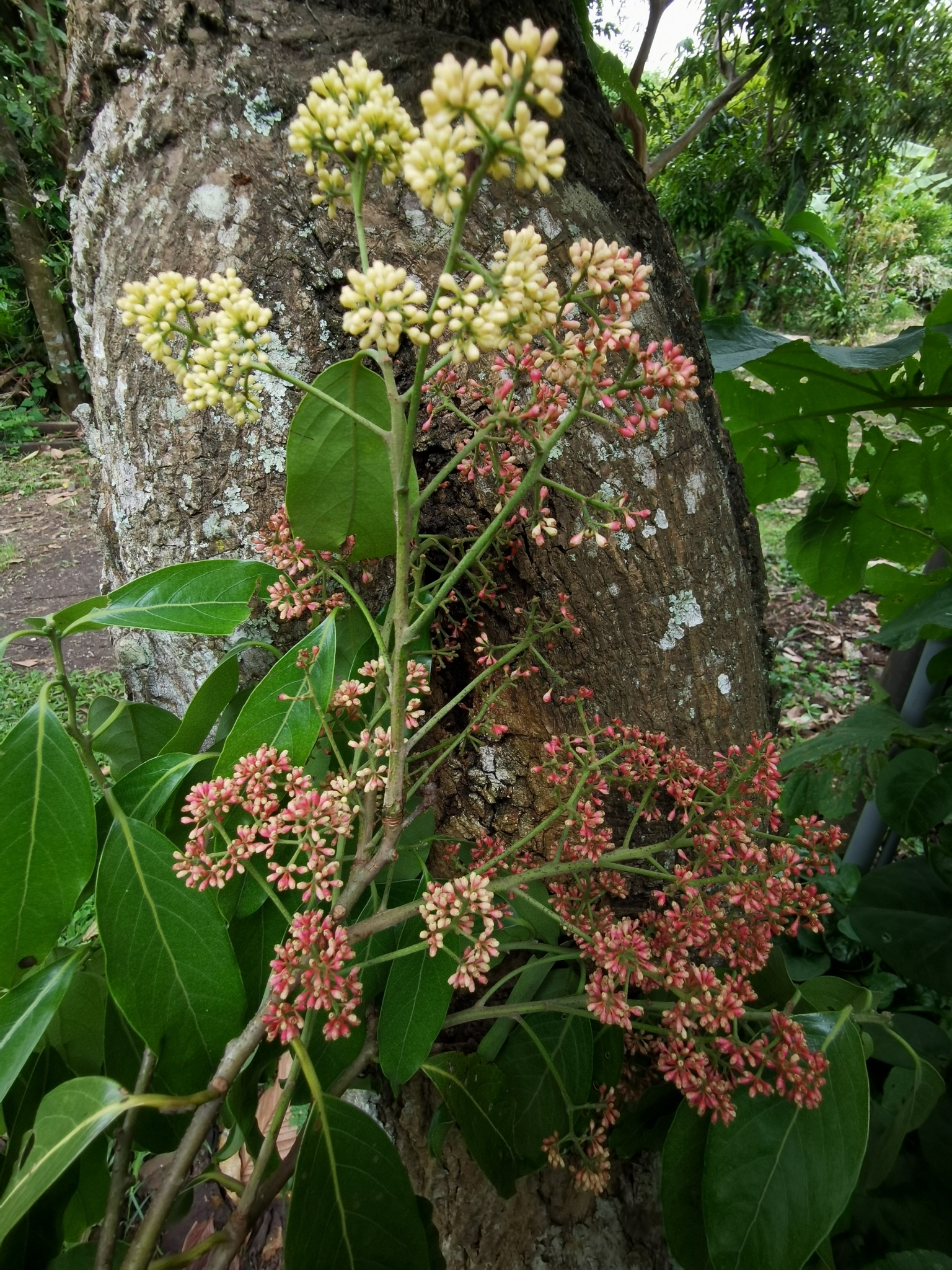
- Licaria triandra

Scientific classification
- Kingdom: Plantae
- Clade: Tracheophytes
- Clade: Angiosperms
- Clade: Magnoliids
- Order: Laurales
- Family: Lauraceae
- Genus: Licaria; Aubl.

Species
- See text

Synonyms
- Acrodiclidium Nees & Mart.; Chanekia Lundell; Evonymodaphne Nees; Gamanthera van der Werff; Misanteca Schltdl. & Cham.; Nobeliodendron O.C.Schmidt; Symphysodaphne A.Rich.; Triplomeia Raf.

= Licaria =

Genus of flowering plants

Licaria is a flowering plant genus in the family Lauraceae, native to Central America and South America. It is a Neotropical genus with around 80 species.

== Overview ==
Licaria is a Neotropical genus consisting of about 80 species distributed from southern Florida, Mexico to the south of Brazil and Bolivia. In Brazil, the occurrence of 20 species and two subspecies, mostly in the Amazon region (Kurz 2000). These trees have a resilient wood, useful as timber, for construction and as firewood.

== Description ==
They are evergreen monoecious, hermaphrodite, trees or rarely bushes. Leaves lax at the apex of the branches, without papillae on the abaxial epidermis of the leaves. The leaves are alternate or opposite but rarely opposite, entire, subcoriaceous in some species of Central America as Nicaragua, glabrous on the upper, glabrous or pubescent on the underside, pinnatinervium. Flowers in panicles terminating in a top. The inflorescences in axillary, paniculata so capitated, the tepals generally the same, with three stamens, the anthers exserted or included at anthesis, filaments free or fused.

Flowers monoclinic with hypanthium urceolate, not depressed below the tepals, tepals 6, generally erect, equal inner surface without papillae. Androecium with three stamens fertile, filaments generally the same width as anthers or more slender, anthers bilocelares: 1st and 2nd series with stamens absent or transformed into staminodes; third grade with 3 stamens, a pair of glands at the base of fiaments present, reduced, never fused, or absent, anthers introrse or extrorse-apical; estaminodial fourth grade absent or rarely present with 3 staminodes. The fruit is a berry with deciduous tepals.

== Species ==
Species accepted by the Plants of the World Online as of 2022:

- Licaria agglomerata van der Werff
- Licaria alata Miranda
- Licaria applanata van der Werff
- Licaria areolata Lundell
- Licaria armeniaca (Nees) Kosterm.
- Licaria aurea (Huber) Kosterm.
- Licaria aureosericea van der Werff
- Licaria bahiana H.W.Kurz
- Licaria brasiliensis (Nees) Kosterm.
- Licaria brenesii W.C.Burger
- Licaria brittoniana C.K.Allen & L.E.Greg.
- Licaria camara (R.H.Schomb.) Kosterm.
- Licaria campechiana (Standl.) Kosterm.
- Licaria cannella (Meisn.) Kosterm.
- Licaria capitata (Cham. & Schltdl.) Kosterm.
- Licaria caribaea Gómez-Laur. & Cascante
- Licaria carinata H.W.Kurz
- Licaria caryophyllata Ducke
- Licaria caudata (Lundell) Kosterm.
- Licaria cervantesii (Kunth) Kosterm.
- Licaria chinanteca Lorea-Hern.
- Licaria chrysophylla (Meisn.) Kosterm.
- Licaria clarensis van der Werff
- Licaria clavata Lundell
- Licaria cogolloi van der Werff
- Licaria colombiana van der Werff
- Licaria comata van der Werff
- Licaria conoidea Lundell
- Licaria crassifolia (Poir.) P.L.R.Moraes
- Licaria cubensis (O.C.Schmidt) Kosterm.
- Licaria cufodontisii Kosterm.
- Licaria debilis (Mez) Kosterm.
- Licaria deltoidea van der Werff
- Licaria dolichantha H.W.Kurz
- Licaria endlicheriifolia (Kosterm.) Kosterm.
- Licaria excelsa Kosterm.
- Licaria exserta van der Werff
- Licaria filiformis van der Werff
- Licaria glaberrima (Lundell) C.K.Allen
- Licaria guatemalensis Lundell
- Licaria guianensis Aubl.
- Licaria herrerae (van der Werff) Kosterm.
- Licaria hirsuta van der Werff
- Licaria ibarrae (Lundell) Lundell
- Licaria latifolia (A.C.Sm.) Kosterm.
- Licaria leonis Gómez-Laur. & A.Estrada
- Licaria lucida (Lundell) C.K.Allen
- Licaria macrophylla (A.C.Sm.) Kosterm.
- Licaria martiniana (Mez) Kosterm.
- Licaria mexicana (Brandegee) Kosterm.
- Licaria misantlae (Brandegee) Kosterm.
- Licaria multiflora (Kosterm.) Kosterm.
- Licaria multinervis H.W.Kurz
- Licaria mutisii (Kosterm.) Kosterm.
- Licaria nayaritensis (Lundell) Lundell
- Licaria nitida van der Werff
- Licaria oppositifolia (Nees) Kosterm.
- Licaria pachycarpa (Meisn.) Kosterm.
- Licaria parvifolia (Lam.) Kosterm.
- Licaria peckii (I.M.Johnst.) Kosterm.
- Licaria pergamentacea W.C.Burger
- Licaria phymatosa Lorea-Hern.
- Licaria polyphylla (Nees) Kosterm.
- Licaria pucheri (Ruiz & Pav.) Kosterm.
- Licaria quercina Lorea-Hern.
- Licaria quirirafuina Kosterm.
- Licaria rodriguesii H.W.Kurz
- Licaria rufotomentosa van der Werff
- Licaria sarapiquensis Hammel
- Licaria sclerophylla van der Werff
- Licaria sericea (Griseb.) Kosterm.
- Licaria sessiliflora van der Werff
- Licaria siphonantha Lorea-Hern.
- Licaria spiritusanctensis P.L.R.Moraes & T.D.M.Barbosa
- Licaria subbullata Kosterm.
- Licaria subsessilis van der Werff
- Licaria tenuifolia Kosterm.
- Licaria terminalis van der Werff
- Licaria tomentosa van der Werff
- Licaria triandra (Sw.) Kosterm.
- Licaria trinervis van der Werff
- Licaria urceolata Lundell
- Licaria velutina van der Werff
- Licaria vernicosa (Mez) Kosterm.
