= Alice Wainwright Park =

Nature preserve located in Miami, Florida, US

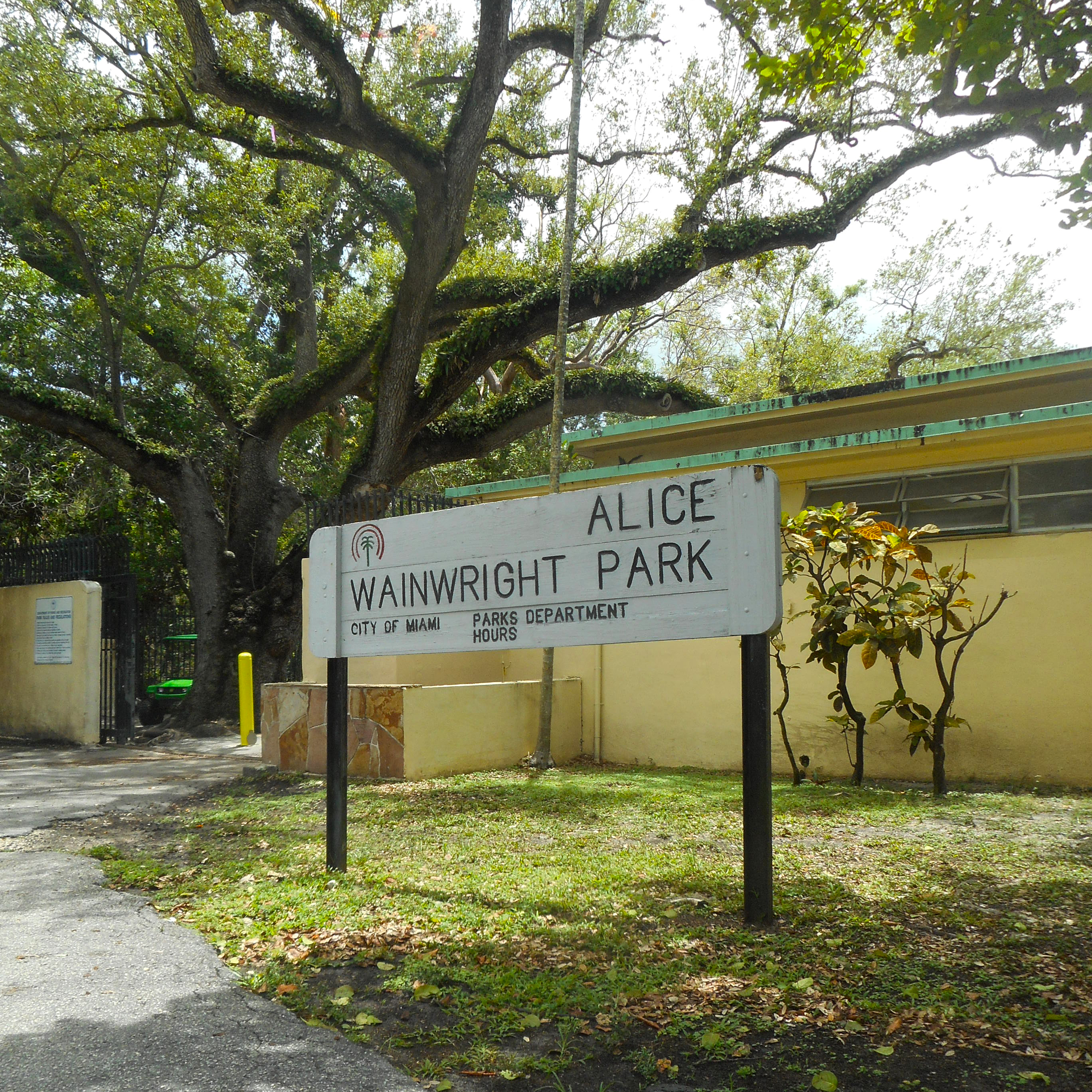
- Alice Wainwright Park Sign on Brickell Avenue
- Interactive map of Alice Wainwright Park
- Type: Municipal
- Location: 2845 Brickell Ave, Miami, FL 33129
- Coordinates: 25.749°N 80.205°W
- Area: 28 acres (0.11 km^{2})
- Created: 1972
- Operator: Miami-Dade Parks and Recreation Department
- Open: 9 a.m. - 5 p.m.
- Website: miamigov.com/parks

Alice Wainwright Park is a 28-acre (11 ha) waterfront park and nature preserve located in northern Coconut Grove, Miami, Florida, United States, on the southern border of Brickell. It is named for Alice C. Wainwright, who was the first woman elected to serve on the City of Miami Commission.

The park planted with palm and gumbo limbo trees, offers, "a stunning vista of Biscayne Bay."

The park is located on Biscayne Bay and has several acres of green space, as well as some athletic and recreational facilities including a playground and basketball courts. The park was built as part of the 1972 Parks for People Bond. The park's entrance is located on a secluded extension of Brickell Avenue that is disconnected from the main portion that was formerly signed as U.S. Route 1. Street parking is available and the road is also part of a popular for biking, where two popular routes converge, including the Rickenbacker Causeway.

Along with Simpson Park Hammock, Alice Wainwright Park includes a fragment of the once widespread tropical hardwood hammock known as Brickell Hammock. The park was once considered partially responsible for some of the blight in the secluded neighborhood, which has long been home to many wealthy residents, including celebrities. This led to contention over the street parking as higher enforcement and private security were on the rise.

== Gallery ==
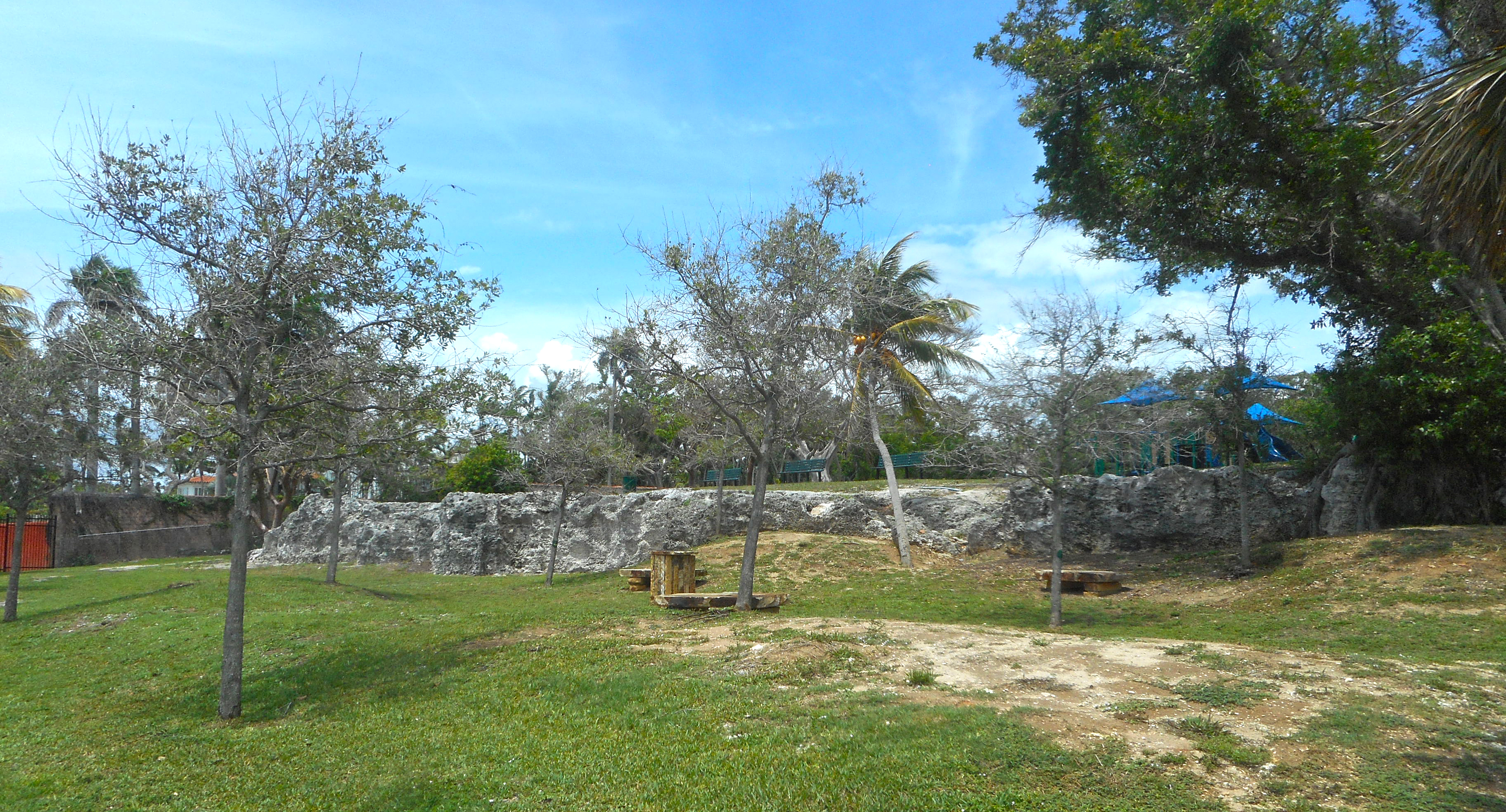
Miami Rock Ridge exposed at the Park

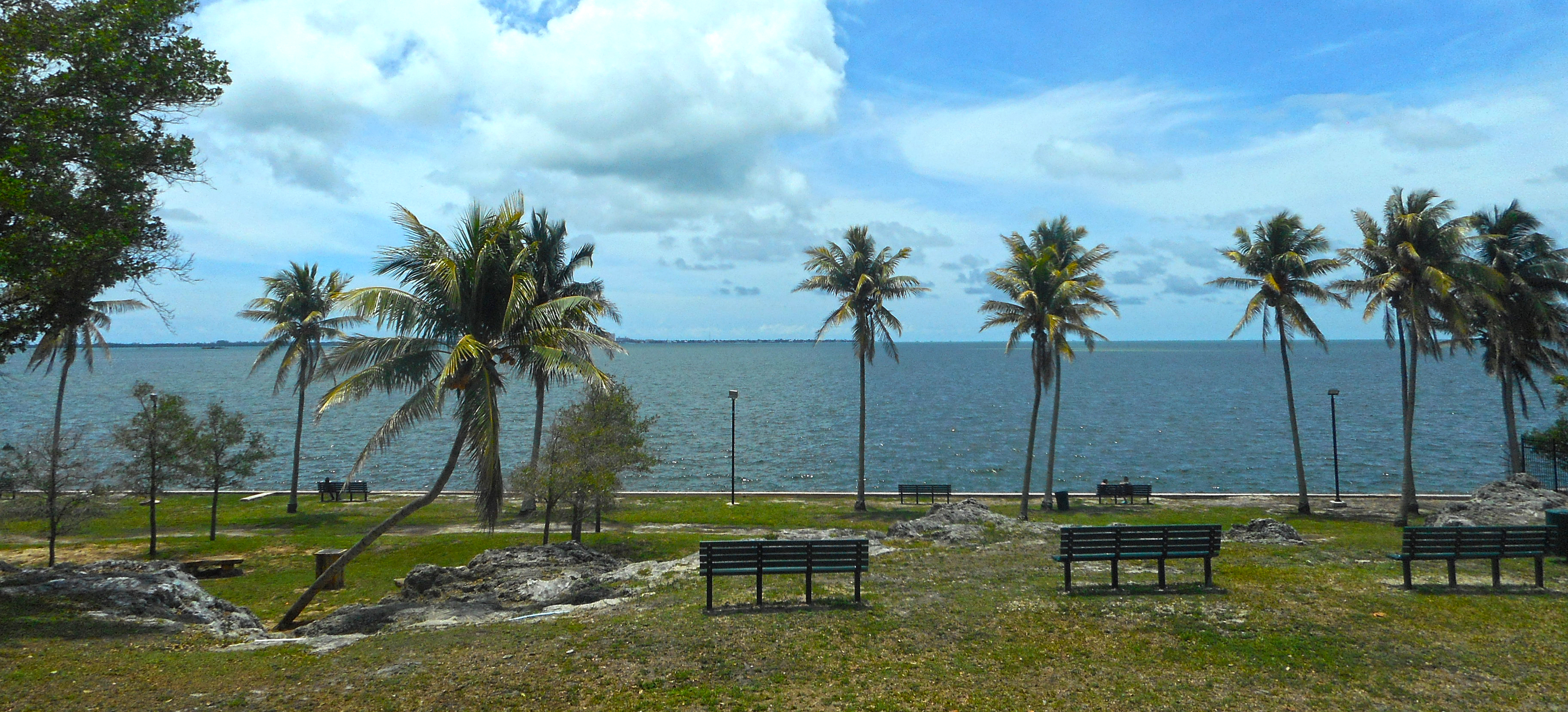
View of Biscayne Bay and Key Biscayne from atop the Miami Rock Ridge
