= Brickell on the River =

Residential buildings in Miami, Florida, United States

Brickell on the River North Tower
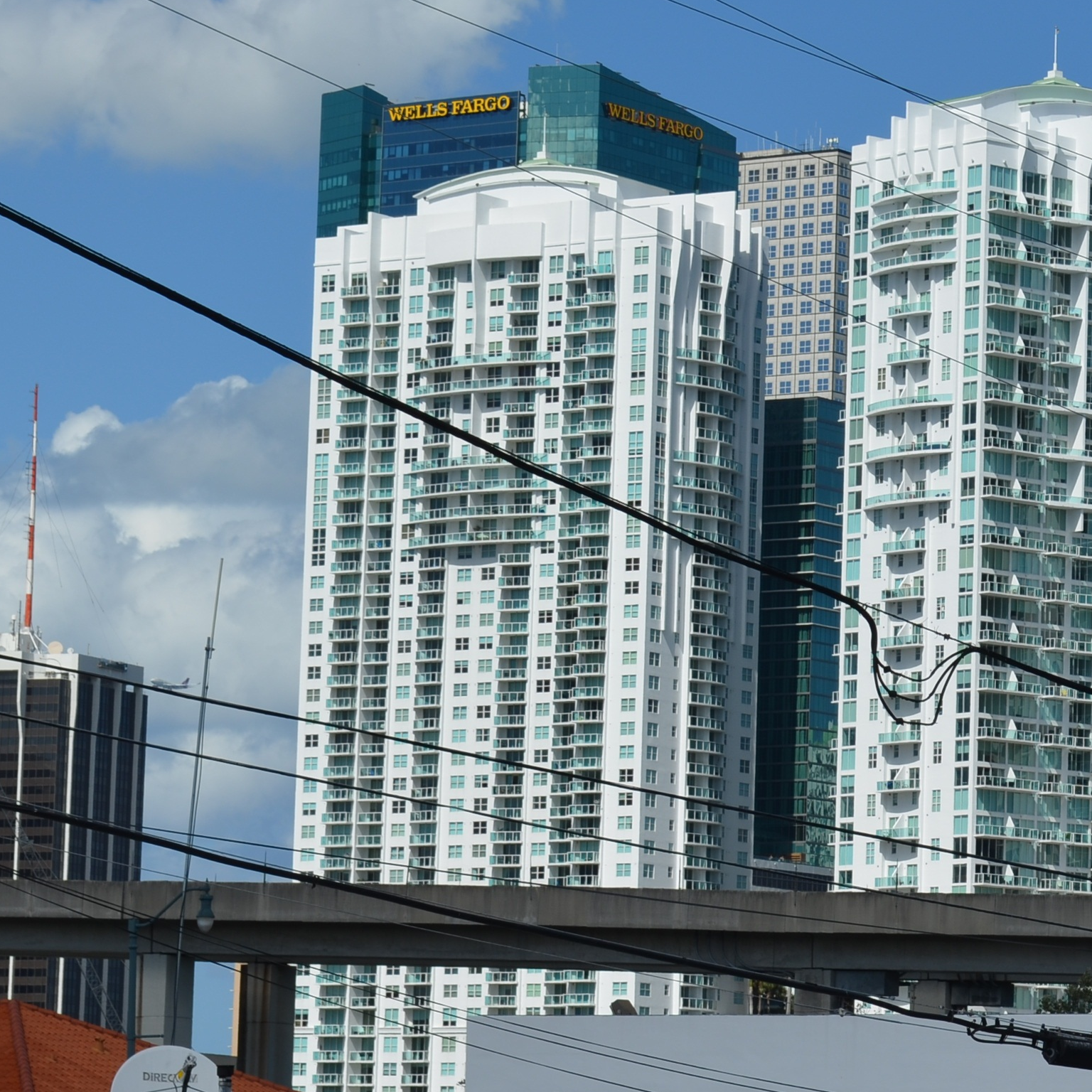
- Brickell on the River North tower from the west in 2012
- Interactive map of the Brickell on the River North Tower area

General information
- Type: Residential
- Location: 31 Southeast 5th Street, Miami, Florida, United States
- Coordinates: 25.769429°N 80.191773°W
- Construction started: 2003
- Completed: 2005
- Opening: 2005

Height
- Roof: 423 ft (129 m)

Technical details
- Floor count: 42

Design and construction
- Developer: Groupe Pacific

Brickell on the River South Tower
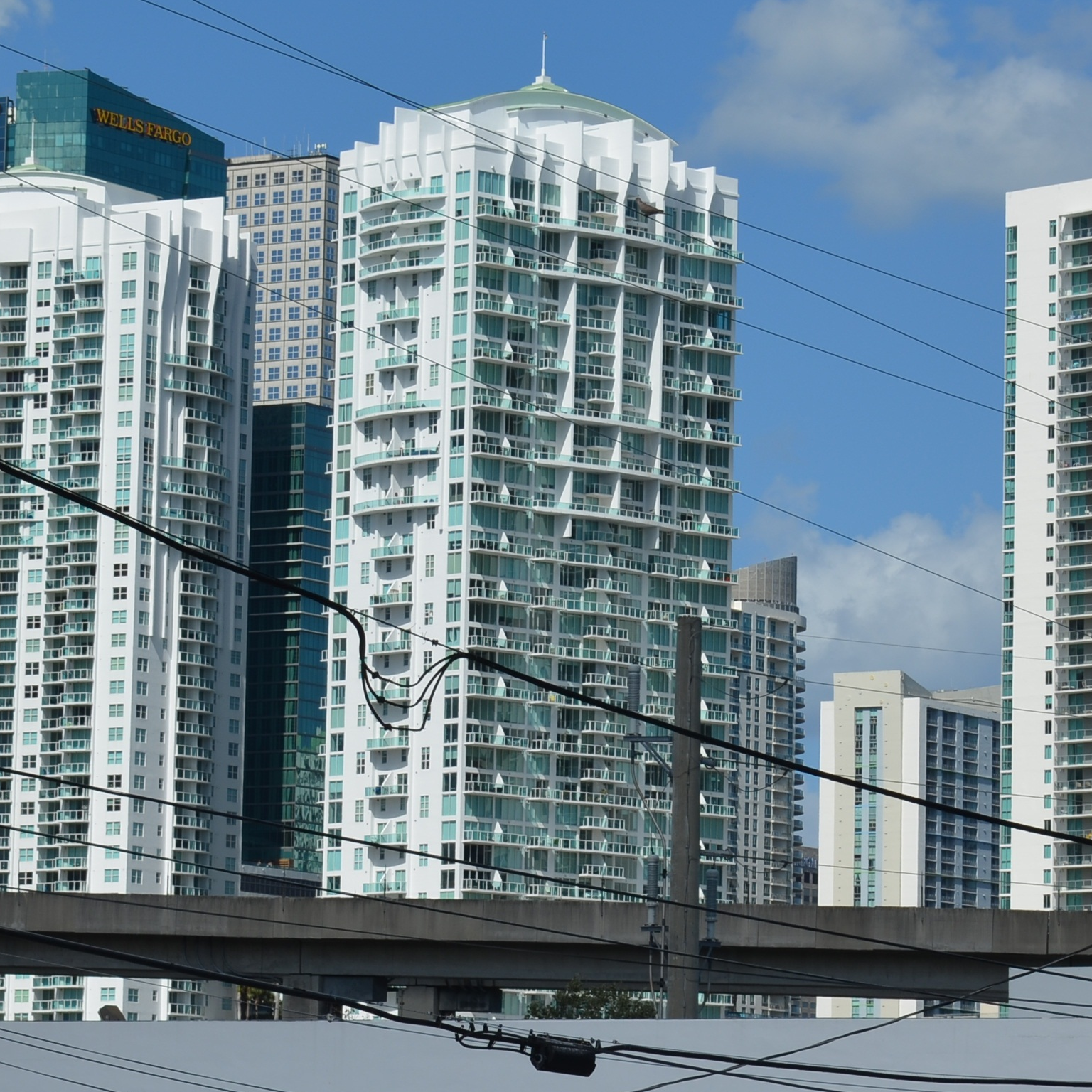
- From the west in 2012
- Interactive map of the Brickell on the River South Tower area

General information
- Type: Residential
- Location: 41 Southeast 5th Street, Miami, Florida, United States
- Construction started: 2004
- Completed: 2007
- Opening: 2007

Height
- Roof: 482 ft (147 m)

Technical details
- Floor count: 42

Design and construction
- Developer: Groupe Pacific

Brickell on the River is a complex of residential towers in Downtown Miami, Florida, United States. The complex consists of a 42-story North Tower, which was completed in 2005, a 46-story South Tower built in 2007, and a central plaza between both towers, containing a restaurant, riverfront promenade, and complex amenities. The North Tower took 31 months to build, as construction began in December 2003, and was completed in July 2006. The North Tower's official height is 423 feet (129 m) while the South Tower sits at 482 feet (147 m). Construction began in 2004, and opened in December 2007.

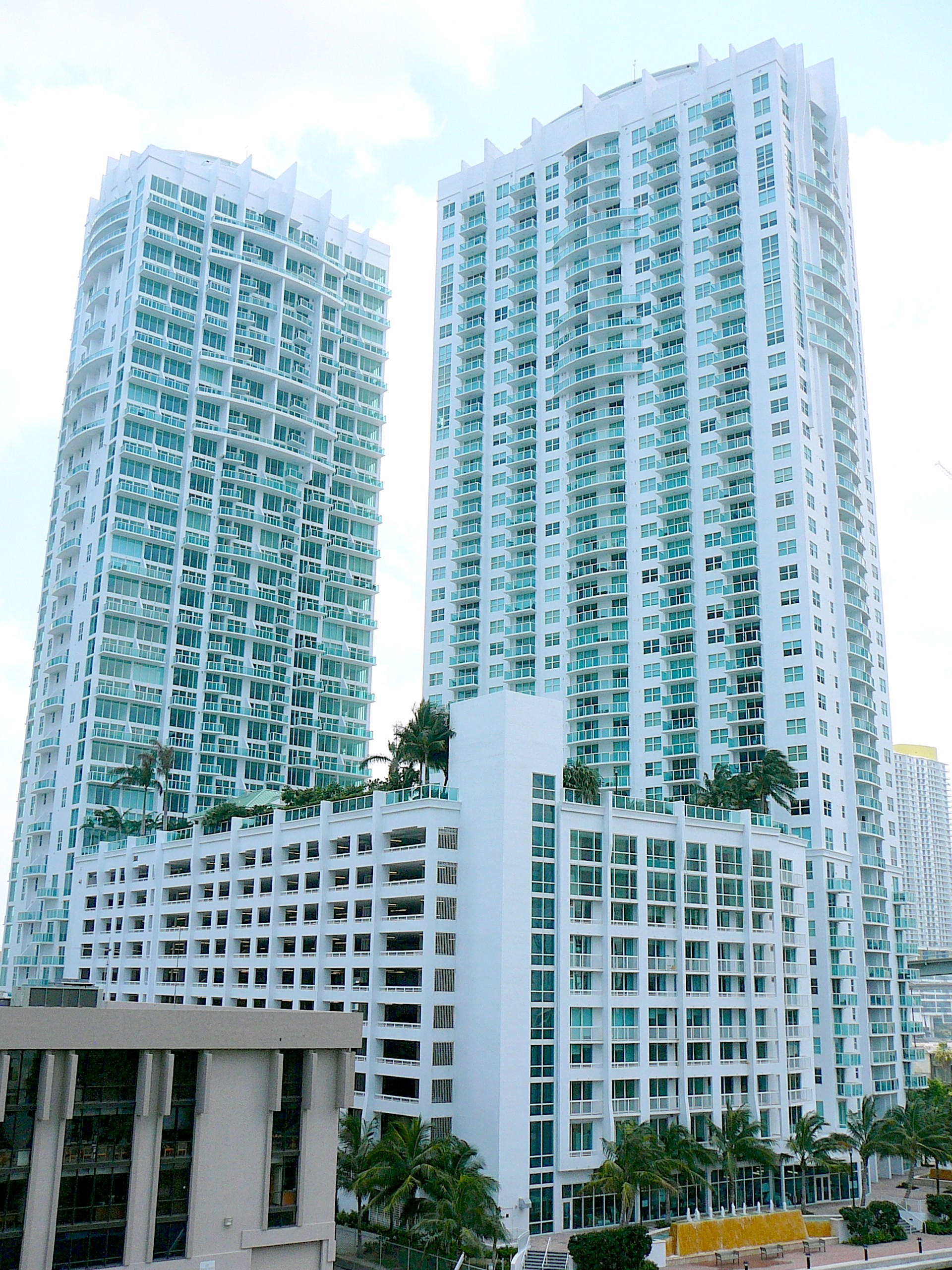
Both towers in 2008

The complex is located on the southern banks of the Miami River in Downtown Miami. The address is 31 SE 5th Street for the North Tower and 41 SE 5th Street for the South Tower. The Fifth Street Metromover Station, a station in Miami's mass transit system, is located immediately adjacent to the North Tower.

Brickell on the River North features 390 condo units with the typical floor plan ranging from 757–1,512 square feet (70.3–140.5 m^{2}) and the Brickell on the River South features 319 condo units with the typical floor plan ranging from 952–1,510 square feet (88.4–140.3 m^{2}).

== See also ==
- List of tallest buildings in Miami
